= Movie Star News =

Photographic collection

Movie Star News was a New York City landmark and a collection of vintage pin-up, bondage, and Hollywood publicity photos amassed over the course of 73 years by Irving Klaw, his sister Paula Klaw and nephew Ira Kramer– nearly 3 million images and 250,000 negatives, including 1,500 prints of Bettie Page, known as the queen of pin-ups.

The bulk of the film collection covers the years 1938 to 1979 with many photos dating back to 1915; 11,500 movies and 5,000 actors are represented.

== Beginning ==
The family business, which eventually became Movie Star News, began in 1938 when Klaw and his sister Paula opened a struggling used bookstore at 209 East 14th Street in Manhattan.

After he observed teenagers frequently tearing out photos from his movie magazines, he saw an opportunity and started selling movie star stills and lobby photo cards. He set up a small box of used movie stills. When these quickly sold, he contacted the studios for more stills. Irving approached the studios directly back when most Hollywood studio publicity departments lined Manhattan's 11th Ave and discovered they were in the habit of throwing away their publicity materials after a film had had its run. Irving bought as much as he wanted for almost nothing, convincing publicity departments he was doing them a favor. Irving would take these originals and negatives meant for magazine and newspaper art departments and reproduce 8×10 glossies of them directly for the purchasing public. The customers could order by item number from catalogs of sample photos. These sold so well that he stopped selling books and moved the store from the basement to the street-level storefront and renamed it Irving Klaw Pin Ups. Business thrived, and the self-named "Pin-Up King" moved to 212 East 14th Street and took on the name "Movie Star News".

== Archiving ==
In later years the studios, having thrown away their publicity archives would often have to rent their own photos back from Klaw. Around the time that Klaw started his bookstore, he also began a mail-order magic trick business, the Nutrix Novelty Library. Like book sales, magic novelties were a financial bust. However, Klaw soon realized that mail order could enhance his movie-still business. He placed advertisements in magazines and shipped catalogs. Before long, mail order was the mainstay of Movie Star News. During World War Two, Movie Star News sold pin-ups of movie stars to the troops with a mailing list of 100,000 names.

== Fetish photography ==
By the late 1940s, Klaw was receiving frequent requests for "Damsel-in-distress" photos of actresses being bound and gagged, spanked, and flogged. Sometime between 1947 and 1950, Irving Klaw was approached by a prominent lawyer with some "special needs." He offered to pay all the costs if Klaw would produce original bondage pictures for him. Klaw would retain the rights. His first bondage model was Lili Dawn. She was photographed in midtown studios by various freelance photographers. Eventually, Klaw rented the third floor over Movie Star News and turned it into a shooting studio. By 1955, Irving Klaw was allegedly grossing $1.5 million a year, primarily through mail order of his fetish pics.

While he worked with many different models, Klaw's images with Bettie Page were his most popular and best known. He met Page when he contacted camera clubs looking for models for his burgeoning fetish photography business. Page was the most popular pin-up of the 1950s, appearing on more covers than anyone else in the decade. While she was Playboy's Playmate of the Month for January 1955, Page is best remembered for Klaw's bondage photos and the nudes by Bunny Yeager.

Klaw always went to great pains to make sure his photographs contained no nudity, which would make the material pornographic and hence illegal to sell via mail. Models were often required to wear two pairs of panties so that no pubic hair could be seen. He and Paula, who actually posed and took most of the photos, started selling bondage and fetish photos using burlesque dancers like Baby Lake, Tempest Storm, and Blaze Starr as models.

Through his production company Nutrix Co. (and later also Mutrix Corp), Klaw also published and distributed illustrated adventure/bondage serials by fetish artists Eric Stanton, Gene Bilbrew, Adolfo Ruiz and others.

Irving Klaw had an unusually close relationship with his sister Paula. The story of Irving and his business has primarily been told through her anecdotes. Paula often ran the front end of the store, but when Klaw began to produce his own photographs and films, Paula befriended the models, often treating them as her own daughters. When another photographer wasn't available, she would grab the camera and shoot the photos. In 1963, in an attempt to satisfy the courts, Irving destroyed his photographs and movies, Paula, unbeknownst to her brother, preserved his legacy – and her financial future – by hiding thousands of the images. After her brother's death, she became fiercely protective of his reputation and his work. Without Paula's foresight, Irving Klaw might have been just an odd, barely remembered footnote in the annals of pin-up history and Fifties puritanism.

== Closing ==
In the early 1980s Movie Star News moved to 134 West 18th Street to avoid rising rents on 14th street. In 2012 Movie Star News moved to Las Vegas, Nevada, and continues to sell originals and reproductions from the collection.
