= The Notorious Bettie Page =

2005 film by Mary Harron

- Theatrical release poster
- Directed by: Mary Harron
- Written by: Mary Harron; Guinevere Turner
- Produced by: Pamela Koffler; Katie Roumel; Christine Vachon
- Starring: Gretchen Mol; Chris Bauer
- Cinematography: Mott Hupfel
- Edited by: Tricia Cooke
- Music by: Mark Suozzo
- Production companies: HBO Films; Killer Films; John Wells Productions
- Distributed by: Picturehouse
- Release dates: September 14, 2005 (TIFF); April 14, 2006 (United States)
- Running time: 91 minutes
- Country: United States
- Language: English
- Box office: $1.8 million

The Notorious Bettie Page is a 2005 American biographical drama film directed by Mary Harron. The screenplay by Harron and Guinevere Turner focuses on 1950s pinup and bondage model Bettie Page, portrayed by Gretchen Mol.

== Plot ==
Bettie Page is an ambitious, naïve, and devout young Christian woman who longs to leave Nashville, Tennessee, following a childhood of sexual abuse, a failed wartime marriage, and a gang rape. In 1949, she departs for New York City, where she enrolls in an acting class. Amateur photographer Jerry Tibbs discovers her walking on the beach at Coney Island and she agrees to model for him. He suggests she restyle her hair with the bangs that would become her trademark.

Bettie becomes a favorite of nature photographers (including Bunny Yeager, who films her posing with two leopards), and she has no hesitation about removing her clothes for the photographers when asked. Before long images of the shapely brunette reach brother-and-sister entrepreneurs Paula and Irving Klaw, who run a respectable business selling movie stills and memorabilia, but also deal with fetish photos, magazines, and 8- and 16-millimeter films for additional income. Their top model Maxie takes Bettie under her wing, and she soon finds herself wearing leather corsets and thigh-high boots while wielding whips and chains for photographer John Willie, frequently at the request of Little John, a mild-mannered attorney with unusual tastes. Bettie is innocently unaware of the sexual nature of the images that rapidly are making her a star in the underground world of bondage aficionados.

In 1955, Bettie is called to testify before a hearing, headed by Senator Estes Kefauver, investigating the effects of pornography on American youth. Though she waits patiently for 12 hours to answer the committee's questions, Kefauver, for reasons unknown, decides to not bring her before the committee and dismisses her without an explanation. When it becomes apparent that casting directors are more interested in her notoriety than in any acting talent she might possess, Bettie heads to Miami Beach. Drifting along with limited career prospects and a virtually nonexistent social life, she stumbles upon a small evangelical church, walks inside and rushes forward to embrace Jesus Christ during the altar call. Although she insists she is not ashamed of anything she has done in her life, she appears happy to leave her past behind and return to her spiritual roots by preaching the word of the Lord on street corners.

In New York, Irving is highly stressed and suffering from poor health. He decides that he and his sister must burn their vast collection of erotic photos and movie footage to avoid potential prosecution. Paula reluctantly complies with her brother's request, but secretly saves the negatives of many of Bettie's pictures and movies from the bonfire, thereby ensuring that Bettie's work will survive for future generations.

== Cast ==
- Gretchen Mol as Bettie Page
  - Molly Moore as Young Bettie Page
- Chris Bauer as Irving Klaw
- Jared Harris as John Willie
- Sarah Paulson as Bunny Yeager
- Cara Seymour as Maxie Lee
- David Strathairn as Senator Estes Kefauver
- Lili Taylor as Paula Klaw
- John Cullum as Preacher In Nashville
- Matt McGrath as Nervous Man
- Austin Pendleton as Herbert Berghof
- Norman Reedus as Billy Neal
- Dallas Roberts as Scotty
- Victor Slezak as Minister In Miami
- Tara Subkoff as June
- Kevin Carroll as Jerry Tibbs
- Ann Dowd as Edna Page
- Michael Gaston as Mr. Gaughan
- Jefferson Mays as John "Little John"
- Peter McRobbie as Gangel
- Jonathan Woodward as Marvin
- Dan Snook as Grimm

== Production ==
In An Inside Look at the Pin-Up Queen of the Universe, a bonus feature on the DVD release of the film, producer Pamela Koffler and screenwriter/director Mary Harron discuss their decision to film most of the movie in black-and-white, which they felt not only perfectly captured the nostalgic mood of the period but also had a psychological impact on the audience. While writing the script, Harron knew she wanted to film the Miami scenes in color in order to provide a sharp contrast between Bettie's professional life and the escape she ultimately made from it. Cinematographer Mott Hupfel used old color stock to approximate the cheerfully vivid hues of Technicolor common in 1950s films.

Actress/screenwriter Guinevere Turner, who co-wrote the film with Harron, was originally slated to star as Bettie Page but the role was given to Gretchen Mol when the producers had difficulty raising money. Harron said from Mol's first audition, she was her first choice for the role. Harron said, "Emotionally, she was so right. She has a natural sort of decorum. So many people made the mistake of being very vampy. At that point, I said, 'Well, you know, it's more important to get the inner Bettie than the outer Bettie.'"

== Release ==
The film premiered at the 2005 Toronto International Film Festival and was shown at the Berlin International Film Festival and the South by Southwest Film Festival before going into limited release in the United States on April 14, 2006. Opening on twenty screens, it grossed $143,131 in its opening weekend. It eventually earned $1,415,082 in the United States and $362,924 in foreign markets for a total worldwide box office of $1,778,006.

The film was released on DVD in the United States on September 26, 2006.

=== Critical reception ===
On the review aggregator website Rotten Tomatoes, the film holds an approval rating of 58% based on 134 reviews, with an average rating of 6/10. The website's critics consensus reads, "This biopic only skims the surface of Bettie Page's life, leaving her as a cipher, and additionally fails to place her iconic status in historical context." Metacritic, with uses a weighted average, gave the film a score of 64/100 based on 38 critics, indicating "generally favorable" reviews.

Manohla Dargis of The New York Times observed, "Until now, Ms. Mol has been best known for her premature designation several years ago as Hollywood's newest It girl. The label seemed to plague her, and she all but faded from view despite promising turns in little-seen films. Maybe because she felt protected by her female director and female producers (six out of seven), or emboldened by the material, or maybe because she knows how beautiful her gently padded silhouette looks in the raw, Ms. Mol takes to this tricky role with the carefree expressivity you tend to see only in young children who have learned the joys of nudity, usually when their parents are throwing a dinner party. When she strips, Bettie soars".

Roger Ebert of the Chicago Sun-Times gave the film 3 and a half stars out of four, writing: "The tone of the movie is subdued and reflective. It does not defend pornography, but regards it (in its 1950s incarnation) with subdued nostalgia for a more innocent time. There is a kind of sadness in the movie as we reflect that most of these women and the men they inflamed are now dead; their lust is like an old forgotten song".

Mick LaSalle of the San Francisco Chronicle stated the film "floats on the charm and the labors of its lead actress, Gretchen Mol, who single-handedly makes the picture worth seeing. She takes a character that is next door to a cipher and infuses her with innocence and mischief, wit and feeling, despite limited help from the script. Perhaps through intuition or through some careful study of Page's pinups, Mol has discovered a human being to play, and in the process has found her best screen showcase to date". Of Harron and Turner he said "They tell Page's story in a curiously uninflected way, revealing little, if any, point of view, and imposing no meaning or particular importance on this woman's life. This approach is far from a recipe for high drama, but it has the integrity of accuracy. The audience is introduced to Bettie because the audience is perhaps interested in Bettie or her career or her era. But there's no pretending that her life was all that fascinating, or that her contribution to culture was significant, or that her story contains a lesson worth receiving... There's enough here for a good after-movie argument, and that's more than can be said for most pictures".

Peter Travers of Rolling Stone rated the film three out of four stars and commented "Any old sleaze could turn Bettie's life into a kinky S&M wallow, a cinematic stroke book. Not that there's anything wrong with that. It's just that director Mary Harron, who co-wrote the scrappy script with Guinevere Turner, doesn't do the expected. She's too sly for that, too subversively funny... [She] needed just the right actress to play Bettie. And she lucked out big time. Gretchen Mol is hot stuff in every sense of the term. She delivers the first performance by an actress this year that deserves serious Oscar consideration".

Todd McCarthy of Variety called the film "a superficial look at the '50s sex icon [that] feels like it was researched via press clippings rather than attempting a fresh rethinking of its era and provocative subject". He added "Mary Harron's work here seems curiously uninvolved. There's no sense of any particular commitment to the leading character... [The] result is a strangely placid, unchallenging picture with no blood in its veins... Gretchen Mol is splendid to behold in every stage of dress or undress, but Harron and co-scenarist Guinevere Turner offer no clues as to what might be going on inside the dark-haired beauty's head and heart... Mol's Bettie is compliant, almost always open to any request and never disagreeable. But her lack of spine and inner turmoil make her a central figure of limited interest, that rare dramatic heroine with no ambition or goal".

== Accolades ==
Mol was nominated for the Satellite Award for Best Actress - Motion Picture Drama, but lost to Helen Mirren in The Queen.

== See also ==
- Bettie Page: Dark Angel

== Bibliography ==
- Sicinski, Michael (Fall 2006). "The Notorious Bettie Page by Lori Keith Douglas, Pamela Koffler, Katie Roumel, Christine Vachon, John Wells, Mary Harron, Guinevere Turner". Cineaste. Vol. 31, no. 4. pp. 70–1. JSTOR 41690408.
