= Evelyn West =

American vedette and burlesque dancer (1921–2004)

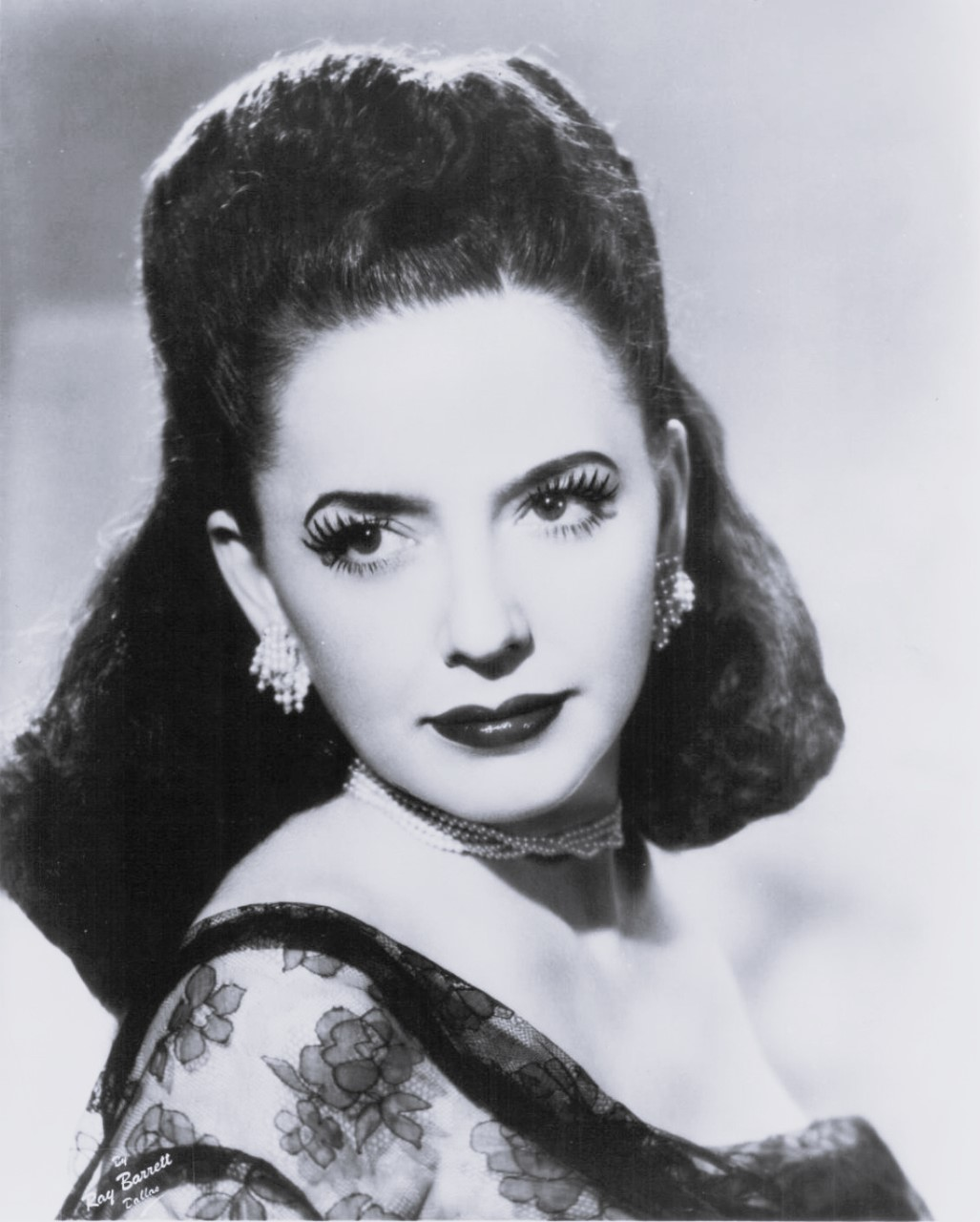
- West in 1958
- Born: Amy May Coomer; January 30, 1921; Adair County, Kentucky
- Died: November 14, 2004 (aged 83); Hollywood, Florida
- Other names: Amy May Coomer; The Hubba-Hubba Girl; Evelyn "$50,000 Treasure Chest" West
- Occupations: actress, model, dancer
- Spouse: Al Charles

Evelyn West (January 30, 1921 – November 14, 2004), a.k.a. Evelyn "$50,000 Treasure Chest" West, and "The Hubba-Hubba Girl", was a vedette and burlesque legend of the 1940s, 1950s, and 1960s.

== Early years ==
Evelyn West was born Amy May Coomer, in Adair County, Kentucky. Her parents were Henderson and Annie Coomer of the poor farming community of Elroy, Adair County, Kentucky. A few years after her birth, her parents divorced. Annie and Amy moved to Illinois where her mother remarried Curtis Hinds of Petersburg, Illinois, where Amy grew up on a farm.
Her two brothers, many years older than Amy remained in Kentucky with their father. Amy had many younger siblings remaining in Adair County as well.

Amy started working at the Illinois State Fair in a sideshow. Her career was not recognized until she was seen in a 1940s newspaper clipping for a performance in Calumet City. During World War Two, Amy and her mother, Annie came to Sacramento, California. Amy went to work at Mather Army Air Field. After World War II, she got a job stripping at the President's Club on Market Street in San Francisco. In 1947, she made the film A Night at the Follies in Los Angeles. She left California for Missouri. In her act she used a dummy of "Esky" the mascot of Esquire magazine as her pseudo lover. By the 1950s, Amy had married club promoter Al Charles. They had no children together.

== Career ==
A fixture at the Stardust on the old DeBaliviere Strip in St. Louis, Evelyn West featured her 39½ inch bustline. She was reported to have insured her breasts for $50,000 through Lloyd's of London in 1947.

Quite the comedian, she would often quip to her audience "I know you're looking at my shoes."

Evelyn West was an ardent publicity seeker. She tried to legally change her name to Evelyn "$50,000 Treasure Chest" West at the Menard County Circuit Court, threw a tomato at rival Anita Ekberg, appeared at nudist weddings, was charged with indecent exposure, sued contemporary Tempest Storm, threatened legal action against Jane Russell, and openly criticized Marilyn Monroe and Jayne Mansfield.

West was widely photographed and depicted in pinup calendars and artwork. A couple examples of those who took Evelyn's picture are photographer/former model Bunny Yeager and Tom Kelley (rose to fame for his Marilyn Monroe calendar). Her only known film credit was for A Night at the Follies (1947). She appeared uncredited as "the cook" in Rhythm on the River (1940) and as "woman in theater" in Birth of the Blues (1941).

== Retirement ==
After her husband Al Charles died, West lived quietly as Amy Charles in Hollywood, Florida. When Tempest Storm and Blaze Starr appeared to full houses at the Mitchell Brothers in San Francisco, Art and Jim Mitchell approached West to come to their theatre. At nearly sixty, Evelyn West declined the offer. A long time St. Louis Cardinals baseball fan, late in life she rooted for the Florida Marlins. She sold collectibles through eBay and made friends with fans online.

== Death ==
Evelyn West died as Amy Charles in 2004 in Florida.
