= Irving Klaw =

American photographer (1910–1966)

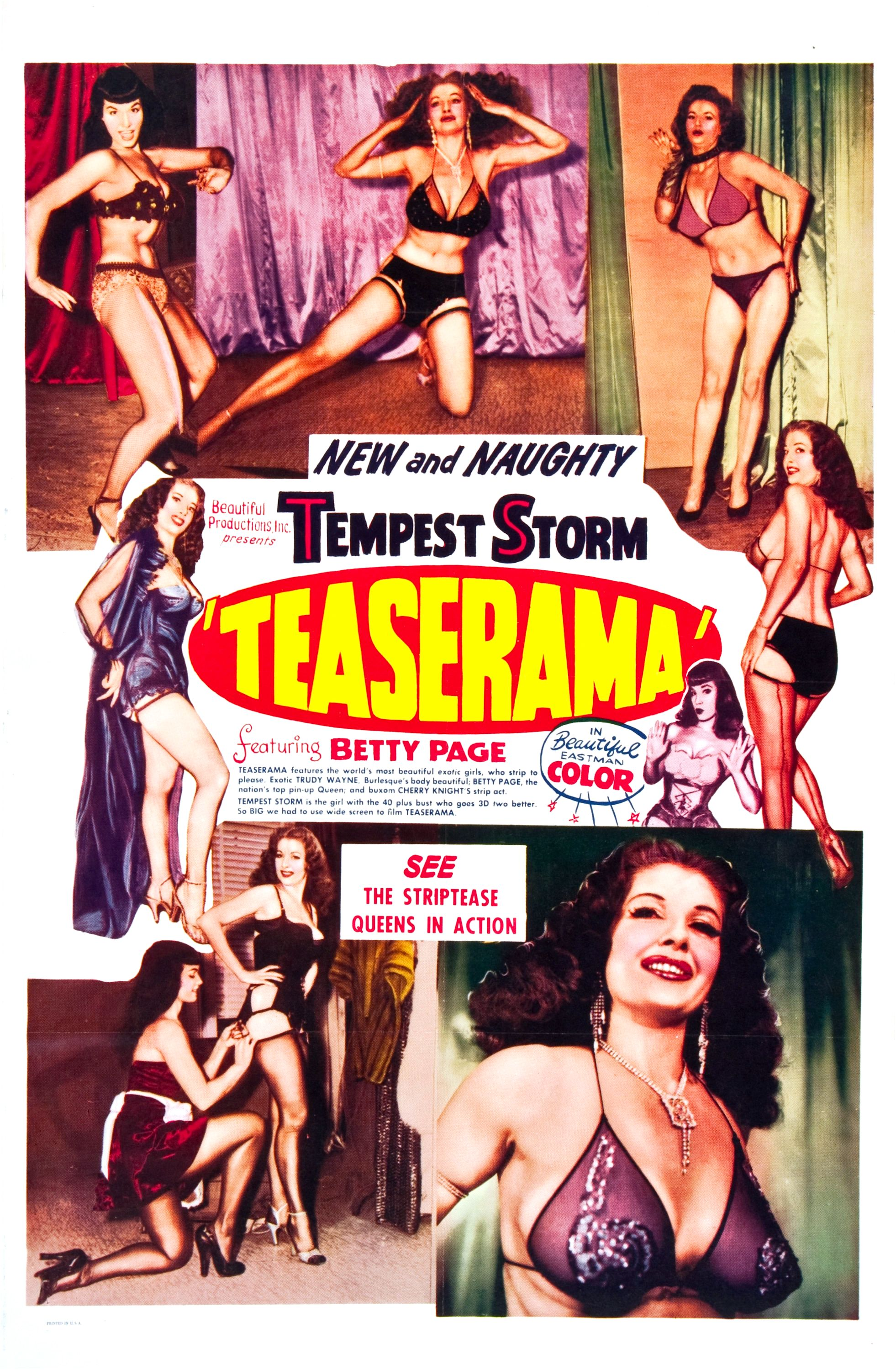
- Teaserama film poster
- Born: November 9, 1910; New York City, US
- Died: September 3, 1966 (aged 55)
- Occupation: Erotic photographer
- Years active: 1938–1964
- Known for: Merchandising fetish art, burlesque photography, and fetish films; patron of illustrative fetish artists Eric Stanton, Gene Bilbrew

Irving Klaw (November 9, 1910 – September 3, 1966), self-named the "Pin-up King", was an influential American merchant of sexploitation, fetish, and Hollywood glamour pin-up photographs and films. Like his predecessor, Charles Guyette, who was also a merchant of fetish-themed photographs, Klaw was not a photographer, but a merchandiser of fetish art imagery and films. He would commission fetish art (with models like Bettie Page, June King, Joan Rydell, Jackie Miller, et al.) and sponsor illustrative artists (like Eric Stanton, Gene Bilbrew, and many others), and indirectly promote the legacy of Charles Guyette and John Willie. Irving Klaw is a central figure in what fetish art historian Richard Pérez Seves has designated as the "Bizarre Underground," the pre-1970 fetish art years.

== Early life ==
Klaw was born on November 9, 1910, in Brooklyn, New York, into a Jewish family. His father, a BMT subway conductor, died when Irving was in high school. His divorce-combined family included three boys and three girls. Paula Klaw is a step-sister.

== Movie Star News ==
Klaw's business, which eventually became Movie Star News, began in 1938 when he and his sister Paula opened a struggling basement level used bookstore at 209 E. 14th St. in Manhattan.

After he discovered teenagers were frequently tearing out photos from his movie magazines, he switched to selling movie star stills and lobby photo cards which sold so well he stopped selling books and moved the store from the basement to the street-level storefront. Business thrived, and the self-named "Pin-Up King" moved to 212 E. 14th St., as Irving Klaw's Pin-Up Photo, eventually taking the name Movie Star News. Klaw also had a brisk international mail-order business selling cheesecake photos and Hollywood glamour pin-ups.

== Fetish art ==
In 1948, a collector/enthusiast known as Little John "inspired/sponsored Klaw's full-blown entry into the fetish art business." Irving Klaw was also influenced by magazine publisher Robert Harrison. Early Klaw fetish models included Harrison models Barbara Leslie, Vicky Hayes, Joan "Eve" Rydell, Lili Dawn, Shirley "Cici" Maitland, Kevin Daley, Roz Greenwood, and Bettie Page.

Inspired by John Willie, Klaw also commissioned and distributed illustrated adventure/bondage chapter serials by fetish artists Eric Stanton, Gene Bilbrew, Adolfo Ruiz, and others.

== Burlesque features and bondage film-loops ==
Irving Klaw had this loft and he was acquainted with an awful lot of strippers... His mode of operation was that he would take these separate segments, one with me, and one with Betty (Bettie) Page, and all these other girls, then he would splice these together until he had enough time, fifty minutes or whatever, and make what he would call a full picture...a bunch of segments of ten or twelve different girls doing their various acts... He'd piece them together in several different movies

— Lili St. Cyr

After the surprise success of the B-movie Striporama, a 1953 burlesque revue with famous striptease artists and model Bettie Page, Klaw quickly duplicated the formula and directed his own burlesque features. Using a professional camera crew and richly saturated Eastman color filmstock, Varietease (1954) and Teaserama (1955) featured Lili St. Cyr, Tempest Storm, and Bettie Page (and were released on DVD in the U.S. in 2000). He produced and directed a third film in 1956, Buxom Beautease, without Page.

Also during this period, Klaw set up weekend home-movie sessions where he produced scores of silent 8 mm and 16 mm black-and-white film loops. These featured striptease acts and an assortment of fetishistic subjects based on special requests from his clientele. Titles such as Riding the Human Pony Girl, Bondage in Leather Harness, and Booted Amazon Fights Again depicted women in skimpy lingerie and high heels engaging in elaborate bondage, cat-fights, spanking, and slave training. Nearly all of these featurettes were shot on a single, sparsely decorated set, either in the studio above Movie Star News or at a nearby loft space. At least two films with Bettie Page (Rumble Seat Bondage and Jungle Girl Tied to Trees) were shot outdoors at secluded locations.

Still photos taken during the sessions were also sold at the store and in the bi-annual mail-order catalog Cartoon and Model Parade.

== Censorship and early retirement ==
In 1956, Abe McGregor Goff, general counsel of the Post Office Department, denied Klaw use of the U.S. mails, insisting he was "one of the nation’s largest dealers in pornographic material".

In 1956, Klaw's sister, Mrs. Fanny Cronin, was arrested for operating a $2 million New Jersey "pornographic films and photos mill".

The Kefauver Hearings of the Senate Subcommittee on Juvenile Delinquency in 1957 marked the beginning of the end of Irving Klaw's mail-order fetish art business in New York. The investigation tried to link pornography to juvenile delinquency. The McCarthy-style hearings branded Klaw as a degenerate pornographer and ushered in a new wave of media censorship. Bettie Page was also summoned to the hearings but was never called to testify (parts of the hearings are recreated in the film The Notorious Bettie Page). She retired from modeling soon afterwards. Because of the political, social and legal pressures he faced, Klaw closed his storefront business and burned many of his negatives. It is estimated that more than 80% of the negatives were destroyed. However, his sister Paula secretly kept some of the better images, which can be seen today.

== Final years ==
After the Senate hearings and the ensuing legal difficulties with state authorities, Klaw was barred from continuing his business in New York. Shortly thereafter he moved his Nutrix Publishing Company, along with the associated Satellite Publications (Stanley Malkin & Pat Martini), to an office building in Jersey City, New Jersey. Both companies sold similar fetish-oriented photos and magazines.

To further avoid prosecution, Klaw's Nutrix publishing imprint was restricted to a mail-order-only business. For several years he published a number of small illustrated bondage/fetish photo-booklets. Titles such as Girl Psycho Handled with Restraint (1960), which includes old photos of Bettie Page, Girls Punishment at School of Discipline (1962), Tortured Models in the Wax Exhibit (1962), and Paddled Severely During Sorority Initiation (1963) are typical examples. Eventually he sold this business to Ed Mishkin, who changed the company name from Nutrix to Mutrix, adding the first initial of his last name.

Klaw relocated to Florida where he briefly returned to filmmaking in 1963, producing two films: Larry Wolk's Intimate Diary of an Artist's Model and Nature's Sweethearts, co-directing the latter. Photographer Bunny Yeager worked closely with him during this period. She had multiple duties on these films, including casting, writing dialog, etc. Unlike his previous movies, both pictures were exploitation "nudie cuties" that featured a number of topless women. Irving continued to photograph bondage in Miami as well, with models like Maria Stinger.

In 1963, Robert F. Kennedy led the campaign to convict Klaw and his brother-in-law, Jack Kramer, of conspiracy to send pornographic materials through the U.S. mail.

Irving Klaw died on September 3, 1966 from complications of untreated appendicitis. He was survived by two sons, Arthur and Jeffrey. His nephew Ira Kramer, son of Paula and Jack Kramer, took over the family business, Movie Star News, which was located on 18th Street but closed in 2012, and relocated to Las Vegas, Nevada.

Klaw was portrayed by Dukey Flyswatter in the 2004 biographical film Bettie Page: Dark Angel and by Chris Bauer in the 2005 film The Notorious Bettie Page.

== Legacy ==
Due to the revival of interest in Bettie Page that began in the 1980s, various compilations of Klaw's films have been released on video and DVD. Background music and narration were added to the silent fetish loops for the two-volume video Irving Klaw Bondage Classics (1984) by London Enterprises.

In 2005, Cult Epics released both volumes on one DVD under the title Bettie Page: Bondage Queen. Also in 2005, Cult Epics put out Bettie Page: Pin Up Queen, a DVD compilation of her burlesque performances from Striporama, Varietease and Teaserama, plus six black-and-white film loops of dancing and a cat-fight.

More of Klaw's bondage film reels, including one with Bettie Page, are in DVD format in Bizarro Sex Loops (Volumes 4 and 20). These are compilations of vintage fetish films released by Something Weird Video (2008).

In 2012 Klaw was inducted into the Leather Hall of Fame.

== Filmography ==
- Striporama (1953)
- Varietease (1954)
- Teaserama (1955)
- Buxom Beautease (1956)
- Intimate Diary of an Artist's Model (1963) – producer
- Nature's Sweethearts (1963) – producer
- Irving Klaw Bondage Classics Volume I & II (London Enterprises 1984)
- Bettie Page: Bondage Queen (Cult Epics 2005)
- Bettie Page: Pin Up Queen (Cult Epics 2005)
- Bizarro Sex Loops Volume 4 (Something Weird Video 2007)
- Bizarro Sex Loops Volume 20 (Something Weird Video 2008)
