= Teaserama =

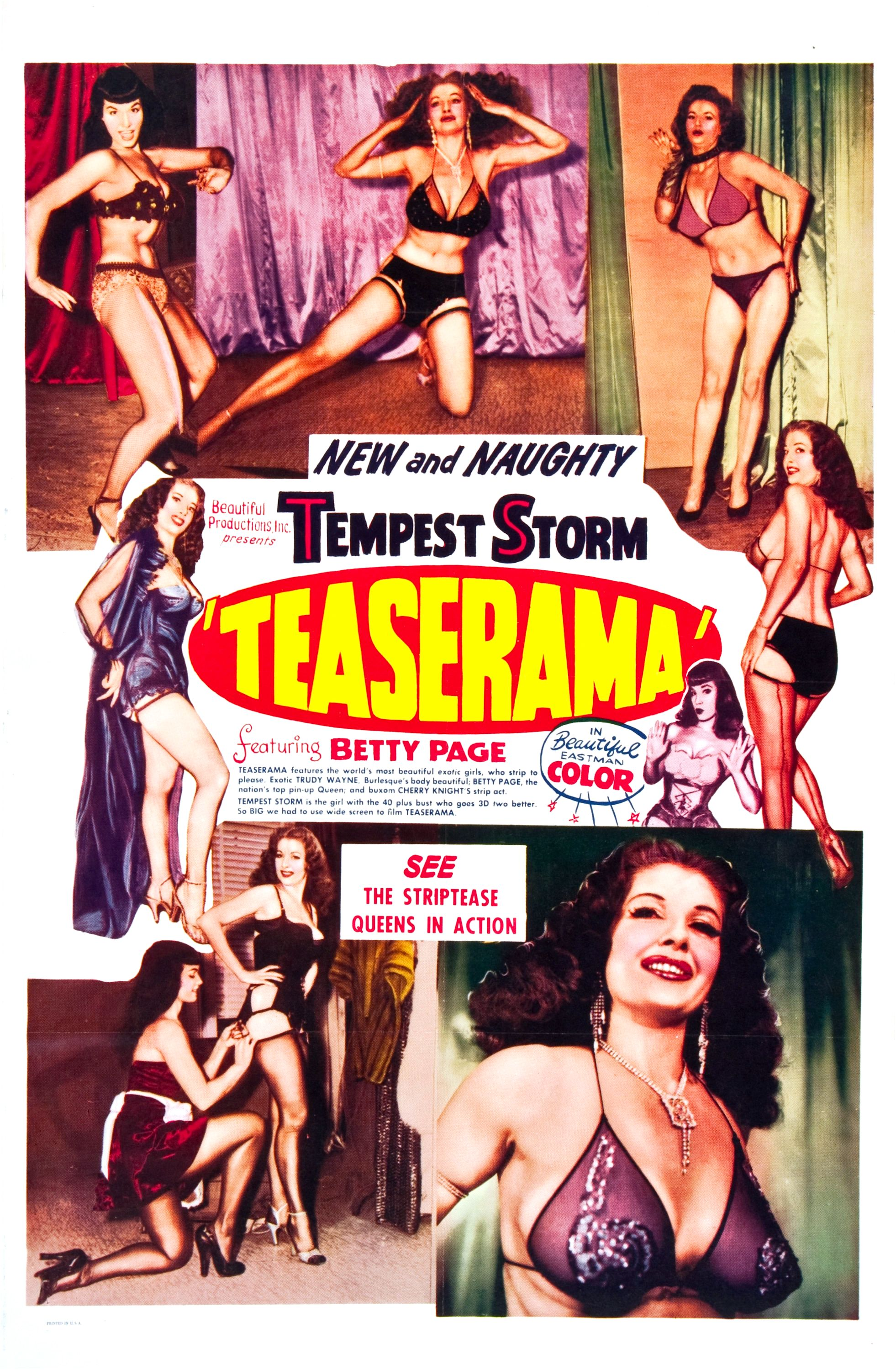
- Theatrical release poster
- Directed by: Irving Klaw
- Produced by: Irving Klaw
- Cinematography: Michael Slifka
- Edited by: Lester Orlebeck
- Distributed by: Beautiful Productions
- Release date: 1955
- Running time: 70 minutes
- Country: United States
- Language: English

Bettie Page in Teaserama

Joe E. Ross with Dave Starr in Teaserama

Teaserama is a 1955 American low-budget sexploitation film directed by Irving Klaw. It follows the performance of a burlesque show. The film stars Bettie Page, Tempest Storm, Chris La Chris, Twinnie Wallen, Trudy Wayne, Vicki Lynn, and Cherry Knight.

== Plot ==
Teaserama is presented as a documentary film, with all actors and actresses playing themselves. It opens with Bettie Page assisting Tempest Storm with her brassiere. Afterwards, when the show begins, Page introduces the acts by showing placards with the names of the acts.

Stripteases are provided by Tempest Storm, Chris La Chris, Twinnie Wallen, Trudy Wayne, Vicki Lynn, and Cherry Knight. Burlesque comedy is provided by Joe E. Ross and Dave Starr.

== Production ==
The film was directed by Irving Klaw, who was known for producing bondage photographs for distribution through the mail. Redheaded burlesque dancer Tempest Storm was cast for the leading role.

Playboy Playmate of 1955 Bettie Page, whom Klaw had previously directed, was cast as a second-tier dancer. Page, who had previously appeared in Striporama (1953) and Varietease (1954), performed three dance routines, including one alongside star Tempest Storm. Teaserama was the last mainstream film in which Page had a major role.

Vicki Lynn, who had also previously appeared in Varietease, appeared in drag in the film. According to film historian Eric Schaefer, Lynn's performance in Teaserama was presented with "the same degree of sensuality and tease as the strips by women" and as "erotic to heterosexual men". He considers the number a form of "gender sabotage" against the prevailing sexual norms of the time.

According to Variety, the film was produced almost entirely without props. The majority occurs on inlaid linoleum with yard equipment visible in the background, although some sofas make an appearance. It was shot in Eastman Color. The film features little nudity.

== Release and reception ==
=== Release ===
Teaserama was released in 1955. In Lorain, Ohio, the film was subjected to municipal censorship where it was ruled "obscene and condemned for destruction." It has since been reissued several times. In 1993, it was released as a video cassette, introducing the 1950s-era burlesque dancers to a new audience.

In 2006, Teaserama was re-released together with Varietease as a double feature DVD by Something Weird Video under the title Bettie Page in Varietease and Teaserama. Something Weird commissioned an artist to draw new promotional illustrations of Page for the double feature, and Page sued Something Weird, alleging that the distributor violated a California statute regarding the use of another’s likeness in advertising materials and also the common law right of publicity. A federal judge dismissed Page's claim, ruling the distributor was within their First Amendment protections.

=== Reception ===
Bill Gibron of DVD Talk wrote that one of the special features on the DVD, a two-hour interview with sexploitation film director David F. Friedman about the history of the genre, was "far more fascinating" than the films. Alessandra Schade from Village Voice opined that it was a "sleaze-chic burlesque movie ... dazzling all the budding Quentin Tarantinos of the video-store age."

Sacha Molitorisz of the Sydney Morning Herald, commented that "it's a fun memento of an extinct artform; through 2006 eyes, it's an oxymoron: innocent exploitation; it's also perfect for any '50s-themed soiree." Film critic Kevin Thomas observed that "Page is awkward before a movie camera, a figure of perky innocence who dances clumsily."

== See also ==
- Striptease
- Irving Klaw filmography
- List of American films of 1955
- List of LGBTQ-related films of the 1950s
- Burlesque
