= Runaway Girl (film) =

1965 film

- Directed by: Hamil Petroff
- Written by: Stewart Cohn
- Produced by: Vernon Keays; Hamil Petroff
- Starring: Lili St. Cyr; Jock Mahoney; Laurie Mitchell
- Cinematography: Eddie Fitzgerald
- Edited by: Bert Honey
- Music by: Richard LaSalle
- Production company: Caren Productions
- Distributed by: Laurel Films
- Release date: May 10, 1965
- Running time: 62 minutes
- Country: United States
- Language: English

Runaway Girl is a 1965 American crime drama film directed by Hamil Petroff and starring Lili St. Cyr, Jock Mahoney and Laurie Mitchell.

== Plot ==
Eight women disembark from a bus to work at a vineyard, but only seven were hired. The mystery girl is no wine girl, but she won't answer questions about her past.

== Cast ==
- Lili St. Cyr as Edella
- Jock Mahoney as Randy Minola
- Laurie Mitchell as Winnie Bernay
- Ron Hagerthy as Mario Minola
- Booth Colman as Angelo Guglietta
- Laurindo Almeida as The Guitarist
- Robert Shayne as Walter Quillen
- June Jocelyn as Louise
- Ann Graves as Ginger
- Shary Marshall as Betsy
- Suzi Carnell as Ruth
- Dusty Enders as Jeanette
- Sandra Phelps as Cleo
- Lisa Pons as Tina

== Bibliography ==
- Gene Freese. Jock Mahoney: The Life and Films of a Hollywood Stuntman. McFarland, 2013.
