= Lili St. Cyr =

American model and burlesque performer (1917–1999)

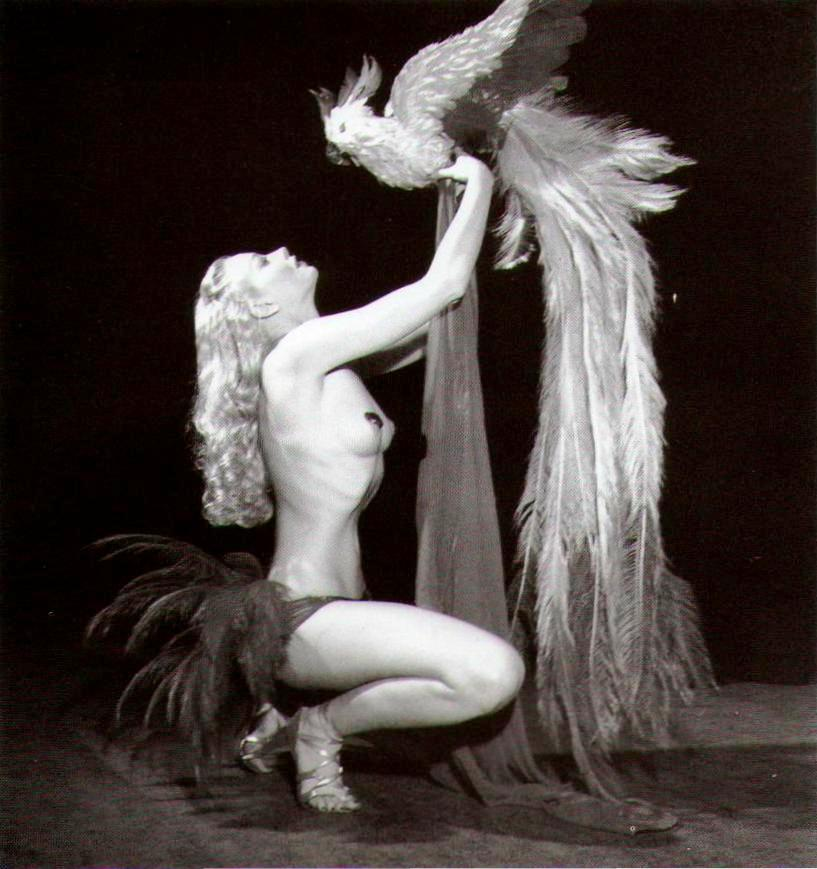
- Lili St. Cyr in Montreal, circa 1946
- Born: Marie Frances Van Schaack; June 3, 1917; Minneapolis, Minnesota, U.S.
- Died: January 29, 1999 (aged 81); Los Angeles, California, U.S.
- Other name: "Anatomic Bomb"
- Occupations: Stripper, burlesque star, model, actress
- Years active: 1937–1965
- Spouse(s): Richard Hubert (?–?); Cordy Milne (1936–?); Paul Valentine (1946–50); Armando Orsini (1950–53); Ted Jordan (1955–59); Joseph Albert Zomar (1959–64)
- Modeling information
- Height: 5 ft 9 in (1.75 m)
- Hair color: Blonde

Marie Frances Van Schaack (June 3, 1917 – January 29, 1999), known professionally as Lili St. Cyr, was an American burlesque dancer and stripper.

== Early years ==
St. Cyr was born Marie Frances Van Schaack in Minneapolis, Minnesota, on June 3, 1917, the daughter of Idella Marian Van Shaack (née Peeza) and Edward Van Shaack, Idella's first husband. She had two half-siblings, a sister and a brother, from her mother's second marriage, and two half-sisters, Idella Ruth and Rosemary, from the third, to John Blackadder. Idella Ruth, born in 1924, had some minor roles in films under the name Barbara Moffett before marrying Louis Marx, a millionaire toy manufacturer. Rosemary, born in 1925 and also a burlesque dancer and stripper (under the stage name Dardy Orlando), married Harold Minsky. Marie was raised by her maternal grandmother, but visited regularly with Idella and Rosemary. In 2004, Rosemary appeared on The Ellen DeGeneres Show.

Having taken ballet lessons throughout her youth, she began to dance professionally as a chorus line member at the Florentine Gardens in Hollywood. St. Cyr had to beg her manager at a club to let her do a solo act. From her self-choreographed act, she eventually landed a bit part at a club called the Music Box in San Francisco, with the Duncan Sisters. It was here that she found a dancer's salary was only a small fraction of the featured star's salary: the difference was that the featured star was nude.

== Burlesque career ==
In the 1940s and most of the 1950s, St. Cyr, Gypsy Rose Lee and Ann Corio were the most recognized acts in striptease. St. Cyr's stage name is a patronymic of the child-saint Saint Quiricus (Cyriacus), which she first used when booked as a nude performer in Las Vegas.

St. Cyr's reputation in the burlesque and stripping world was that of a quality and high-class performer, unlike others such as Rose La Rose, who flashed her pubic hair. Two years after she started her career as a chorus line dancer, her stripping debut was at the Music Box, in an Ivan Fehnova production. The producer had not even seen her perform—her striking looks won him over. The act was a disaster, but instead of firing her, Fehnova put together a new act. At the end of the dance, a stagehand pulled a fishing line attached to St. Cyr's G-string which flew into the balcony as the lights went dim. This act was known as The Flying G, and such creative shows became St. Cyr's trademark.

Over the ensuing years and in a variety of different venues, many of St. Cyr's acts were memorable, with names like "The Wolf Woman", "Afternoon of a Faun", "The Ballet Dancer", "In a Persian Harem", "The Chinese Virgin", as well as "Suicide" (where she tried to woo a straying lover by revealing her body), and "Jungle Goddess" (in which she appeared to make love to a parrot). Props were integral to many of her acts. Lili was known not only for her bathtub, but elaborate sets of vanities, mirrors, and hat racks. She variously performed as Cinderella, a matador, Salome, a bride, a suicide, Cleopatra, and Dorina Grey.

=== Montreal ===
St. Cyr's work from 1944 to 1951 at Montreal's Gayety Theatre led author and filmmaker William Weintraub to later describe her as "Montreal's most famous woman, the city's femme fatale...". Quebec's Catholic clergy condemned her act, declaring that whenever she dances "the theater is made to stink with the foul odor of sexual frenzy." The clergy's outcry was echoed by the Public Morality Committee. St. Cyr was arrested and charged with behavior that was "immoral, obscene and indecent." She was acquitted, but the public authorities eventually closed down the Gayety Theatre.

In 1982, St. Cyr wrote a French autobiography, Ma Vie de Stripteaseuse. (Éditions Quebecor). In the book, she declared her appreciation for the Gayety Theatre and her love for the city of Montreal.

=== Hollywood: nightclubs, films and photographs ===
While performing in 1947 (1951?) at Ciro's nightclub in Hollywood (billed as the "Anatomic Bomb"), St. Cyr was arrested by police and taken to court by a customer who considered her act lewd and lascivious. In December 1951, Herman Hover, owner of Ciro's, was involved with St. Cyr's indecent exposure case. She was accompanied by Armando Orsini, her husband. Represented by the infamous Hollywood attorney Jerry Giesler in court, St. Cyr insisted to the jury that her act was refined and elegant. As St. Cyr pointed out, what she did was slip off her dress, try on a hat, slip off her brassiere (G-string and brassiere of pink net underneath), and slip into a négligée. Then, undressing discreetly behind her maid, she stepped into a bubble bath, splashed around, and emerged, more or less dressed. After her appearance as a witness, as a newspaper account of the time put it, "The defense rested, as did everyone else." After just 80 minutes of deliberation by the jury, St. Cyr was acquitted.

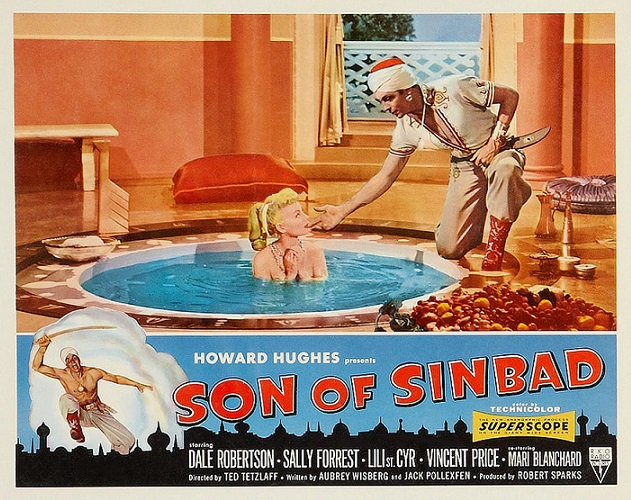
St. Cyr in Son of Sinbad (1955)

While St. Cyr starred in several movies, an acting career never really materialized. In 1953, with the help of Howard Hughes, St. Cyr landed her first acting job in a major motion picture in the Son of Sinbad. The film, described by one critic as "a voyeur's delight", has St. Cyr as a principal member of a Baghdad harem populated with dozens of nubile starlets. The film was condemned by the Catholic Legion of Decency. In 1958, St. Cyr also had roles in Josette from New Orleans and the movie version of Norman Mailer's The Naked and the Dead. In this film, St. Cyr plays Jersey Lili, a stripper in a Honolulu night-club and girlfriend of a soldier who boasts to his pals that he has her picture painted inside his groundsheet. Heavy editing of St. Cyr's night-club routine by censors resulted in choppy editing, compromising the film's quality. St. Cyr's movie career was short lived, and typically she settled for playing a secondary role as a stripper, or playing herself. Her dancing is featured prominently in two Irving Klaw films, Varietease and Teaserama. St. Cyr starred in Runaway Girl (1965).

St. Cyr was also known for her pin-up photography, especially for photos taken by Bruno Bernard, known professionally as "Bernard of Hollywood", a premier glamor photographer of Hollywood's Golden Era. Bernard said that she was his favorite model and referred to her as his muse.

=== Retirement ===
St. Cyr depleted the wealth she accumulated during her heyday. While interviewing her for his 1957 program, Mike Wallace stated she earned over $100,000 annually. St. Cyr retired from the stage in the 1970s. In the early 1960's, she had begun a mail-order lingerie business that she retained an interest in until her death. Similar to Frederick's of Hollywood, The Undie World of Lili St. Cyr designs offered costuming for strippers in addition to lingerie for personal use. Her catalogs featured photos or drawings of her modeling each article, lavishly detailed descriptions, and hand-selected fabrics. Her marketing for "Scantie-Panties" advertised them as "perfect for street wear, stage or photography." Her later years were "quiet—just her and some cats in a modest Hollywood apartment."

== Personal life ==
Though less prominent toward the end of her life, her name came up regularly in 1950s tabloids: stories of her many husbands, brawls over her, and her attempted suicides. St. Cyr was married six times. Her best-known husbands were the motorcycle speedway rider Cordy Milne, musical-comedy actor and former ballet dancer Paul Valentine, restaurateur Armando Orsini, and actor Ted Jordan.

== Death ==
St. Cyr died in Los Angeles, California, on January 29, 1999, aged 81. She never had children, and told Mike Wallace in an October 5, 1957, interview that had she wanted them she would have adopted.

== Legacy and cultural references ==
Lili St. Cyr became a name inspiration for Raymond Dubé/Lana St. Cyr, one of the first drag performers in Montreal. Lili St-Cyr herself granted Dubé permission to use her surname and asked him to choose the first name of his favorite actress to complete the stage name (his choice being Lana Turner).

Following her death and a renewed interest in burlesque, especially in Bettie Page, legions of new fans rediscovered some of the dancers in Irving Klaw's photos and movies. In 2001, A&E produced a special on burlesque that included a segment on St. Cyr.

St. Cyr is referenced in two songs that were both stage and movie musicals. In the song "Zip" from the 1940 musical Pal Joey by Richard Rodgers and Lorenz Hart, the singer (reporter/would-be stripper Melba Snyder) rhetorically asks at the climax of the song "Who the hell is Lili St. Cyr?" [i.e., what has she got that I don't have?] In the 1973 musical The Rocky Horror Show, the final line of the song "Don't Dream It, Be It" (sung by the character Janet Weiss) is "God bless Lili St. Cyr!"

In 1981, actress Cassandra Peterson became famous for her character Elvira, who achieved her trademark cleavage wearing a Lili St. Cyr deep plunge bra.

In 1989, one of St. Cyr's husbands, Ted Jordan, wrote a biography of Marilyn Monroe entitled Norma Jean: My Secret Life with Marilyn Monroe (New York, William Morrow and Company, 1989), in which Jordan claimed that St. Cyr and Monroe had an affair. The claim is both widely disparaged by Monroe's biographers and widely upheld by St. Cyr's. Liza Dawson, editor for William Morrow, publisher of the Jordan book, makes a related claim in an interview with Newsday in 1989. Dawson stated that "Marilyn very much patterned herself on Lili St. Cyr—her way of dressing, of talking, her whole persona. Norma Jean was a mousy, brown-haired girl with a high squeaky voice, and it was from Lili St. Cyr that she learned how to become a sex goddess."

== Filmography ==
- Love Moods (1952)
- Bedroom Fantasy (1953)
- Striporama (1953)
- Varietease (1954)
- Teaserama (1955)
- Son of Sinbad (1955)
- Buxom Beautease (1956)
- The Naked and the Dead (1958)
- I, Mobster (1958)
- Runaway Girl (1962/1965)
