= Sam Menning =

American actor (1925-2010)

Sam Menning (January 5, 1925 – March 29, 2010) was an American character actor and photographer.

Menning began his career in the 1950s as a photographer in New York City before switching to acting during the 1980s. Menning was the last person to photograph pin-up model Bettie Page before her retirement from modelling.

Before becoming a professional actor in the 1980s, Menning worked in a number of positions within the entertainment industry, including a still photographer, grip, gaffer and lighting technician. His television credits included Yes, Dear, Guideposts Junction, Sabrina the Teenage Witch (in the episode "Pancake Madness"), and In Case of Emergency, and he portrayed a homeless man called Pickled Egg Guy in My Name Is Earl. In film, Menning appeared in Mel Brooks' 1991 film Life Stinks, portrayed another homeless man in Speedway Junky, and a blind stagehand in the 2006 thriller, The Prestige, directed by Christopher Nolan.

Sam Menning died of emphysema at Providence Saint Joseph Medical Center in Burbank, California, on March 31, 2010, at the age of 85. His memorial service was held at Angeleno Valley Mortuary in North Hollywood.
