= Gretchen Mol =

American actress (born 1972)

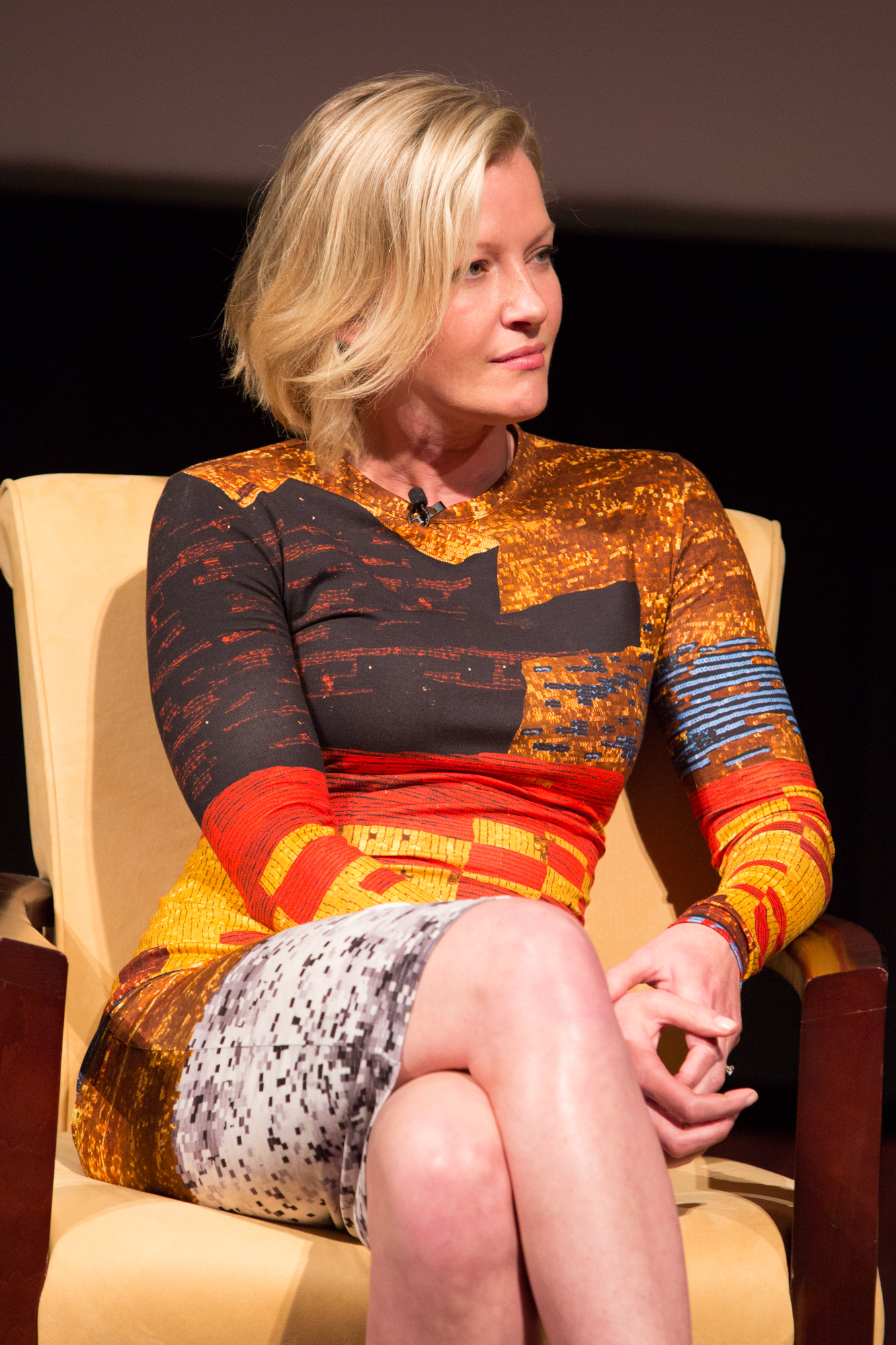
- Mol in 2015
- Born: November 8, 1972 (age 53); Deep River, Connecticut, U.S.
- Occupation: Actress
- Years active: 1996-present
- Spouse: Tod Williams (m. 2004)
- Children: 2

Gretchen Mol (born November 8, 1972) is an American actress. She is known for her role as Gillian Darmody in the HBO series Boardwalk Empire (2010–2014). She also appeared in the films Rounders (1998), Celebrity (1998), The Thirteenth Floor (1999), The Notorious Bettie Page (2005) – in which she played the title character – 3:10 to Yuma (2007), and Manchester by the Sea (2016).

== Early life and education ==
Mol was born on November 8, 1972, in Deep River, Connecticut, where her mother, Janet (née Morgan), is an artist and teacher, and her father James was a teacher at RHAM High School. She went to high school with Broadway actor Peter Lockyer, with whom she performed in school musicals and plays. Her brother, Jim Mol, is a director and editor in the film industry.

Mol attended The American Musical and Dramatic Academy and graduated from the William Esper Studio. She took a job for a while as an usher at Angelika Film Center in New York. She had followed her brother there when he was in NYU film school.

== Stage ==
Mol's acting career began in summer stock theatre in Vermont where she played a variety of roles, including Godspell and 110 in the Shade. She played Jenny in Neil LaBute's The Shape of Things on stage in both London and New York in 2001, in a role she reprised in the film version, released in 2003. The New York Times critic Ben Brantley, in his review of the play (which he disliked), wrote, "[Mol] gives by far the most persuasive performance as the unworldly Jenny, and you wind up feeling for her disproportionately, only because she seems to be entirely there, in the present tense". In 2004, Mol spent a year singing and dancing as Roxie Hart in the Broadway production of Chicago. In 2014–2015, Mol played the role of Emily in the Broadway debut of Ayad Akhtar's Pulitzer-Prize-winning play, Disgraced.

== Film ==
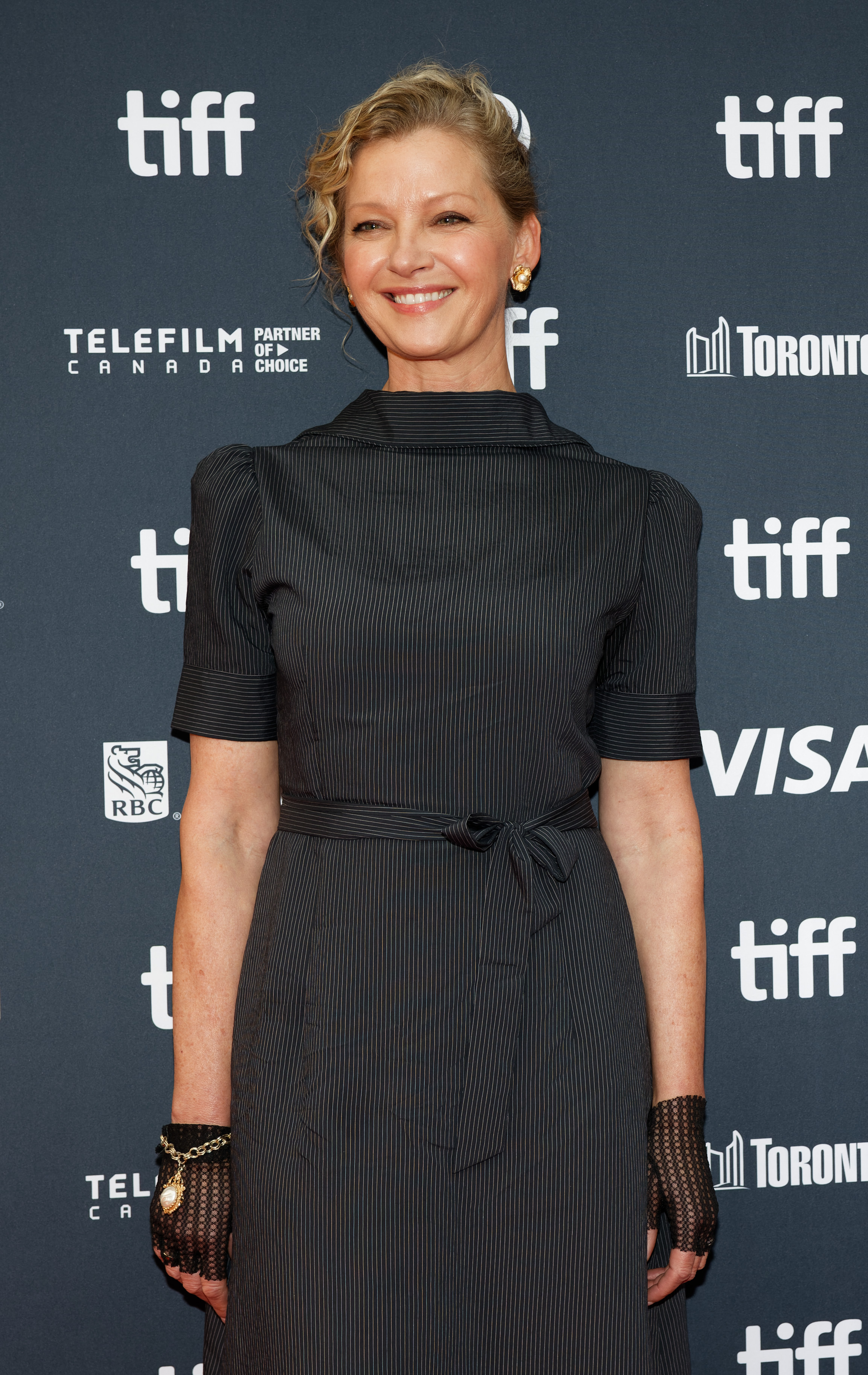
Mol at the 2024 Toronto International Film Festival

While major roles have been sporadic, Mol has been in more than 30 feature films. She made her film debut in Spike Lee's 1996 film, Girl 6. She said, "I was auditioning for Guiding Light and I was happy I got a Spike Lee movie, which was a tiny part, but all of a sudden I had Spike Lee on my resume. I didn't audition for day player anymore".

After Girl 6, New York filmmaker Abel Ferrara took notice and cast her in two movies, The Funeral (1996) and New Rose Hotel (1998). She had a small role in Donnie Brasco (1997), but by now, she was being typecast as "the girlfriend", which she attempted to change by taking a role opposite Jude Law in Music from Another Room (1998), a romantic comedy. The film went virtually unnoticed by critics and audiences.

In 1998, she appeared in several notable films, including Rounders, starring Matt Damon and Woody Allen's Celebrity opposite Leonardo DiCaprio. In 1998, she also came to prominence when she was featured on the cover of Vanity Fair, dubbed the "It Girl of the Nineties" by the magazine.

For her second film with Woody Allen, 1999's Sweet and Lowdown, she played a minor role which the Greenwich Village Gazette called "notable". She played the female lead role in the 1999 film The Thirteenth Floor. She played the victim of a con artist in the 2003 short film Heavy Put-Away, based on the Terry Southern story. In 2006, she shared the lead in a romantic comedy, Puccini for Beginners, in which her character has a lesbian affair.

Mol worked with Mary Harron for two years as the director struggled to finance The Notorious Bettie Page: "I kind of felt like I lived with it for a while; certainly not as long as Mary Harron did but I got a good chance to really feel like I knew something about Bettie so by the time the role was mine and I was on set, I was pretty confident. I felt like I really worked for it."

The next year, 2007, was one of her busiest, with four films in production or in release, including a remake of 3:10 to Yuma starring Russell Crowe, and An American Affair, in which her character, Catherine Caswell, has an affair with John F. Kennedy. When released in February 2009, the film was harshly criticized by New York Times critic Stephen Holden, though he said that Mol's part was "quite well acted".

In April 2008, she began filming Tenure in Philadelphia, working opposite Luke Wilson and Andrew Daly. Though it had received some good reviews after being screened at several film festivals, it was released direct-to-video in February 2010. She appeared in Kenneth Lonergan's acclaimed film Manchester by the Sea in 2016.

== Television ==
Mol's first television work was in a Coca-Cola commercial. Mol played the small role of Maggie Tilton in the 1996 miniseries Dead Man's Walk, based on the Larry McMurtry novel. She also was in a few episodes of Spin City. She was among the three lead actresses in David E. Kelley's 2002 series girls club, though it ended after its second episode due to underwhelming ratings.

She appeared in two TV remakes of classic films: Picnic (2000), in the role of Madge Owens, and The Magnificent Ambersons as Lucy Morgan (2002). She starred in the 2007 Hallmark Hall of Fame television movie The Valley of Light, a story set in post–World War II based on a novel by Terry Kay. It was her second Hallmark production. She had a minor role in Calm at Sunset in 1996.

She played Norah in The Memory Keeper's Daughter which aired on The Lifetime Channel in April 2008.

She played NYPD officer Annie Norris in the ABC series Life on Mars, the US remake of the British series of the same name.

Mol had a recurring role on HBO's Boardwalk Empire as Gillian Darmody, a showgirl at the Beaux Arts and mother and incestuous lover of gangster Jimmy Darmody (played by Michael Pitt). Mol shared two SAG Awards for Outstanding Performance by an Ensemble in a Drama Series with the cast in 2010 and 2011.

In February 2018, she played attorney Sam Henessy in the Netflix series Seven Seconds.

== Personal life ==
Interviewed by the Associated Press in Baltimore in December 2006, Mol commented about how she maintained her confidence as an actress: "It is an ongoing struggle. Confidence is something that sometimes you have and sometimes you don't. And the older you get, hopefully, the more you have some tools to at least fake it".

She married film director Tod Williams on June 1, 2004. Their first child, a son, was born in September 2007. In February 2011, Mol gave birth to their second child, a daughter. Since becoming a mother, Mol has taken only those jobs that are close to her home in New York City. "I told my agent I didn't want to work in L.A., even if it was the greatest job in the world. I didn't want to compromise."

Mol serves as the national spokesperson in the United States for the PMD Foundation, which funds research and awareness of Pelizaeus–Merzbacher disease, a neurological disorder that affects children. Mol became involved with PMD after one of her cousins died from amyotrophic lateral sclerosis (familiarly known as "Lou Gehrig's Disease").

== Filmography ==
=== Film ===
Year	Title	Role	Notes
1996	Girl 6	Girl #12	
1996	The Funeral	Helen	
1997	Donnie Brasco	Sonny's girlfriend	
1997	The Last Time I Committed Suicide	Mary Greenway	
1997	The Deli	Mary	
1998	Too Tired to Die	Capri	
1998	Music from Another Room	Anna Swann	
1998	Rounders	Jo	
1998	New Rose Hotel	Hiroshi's wife	
1998	Celebrity	Vicky	
1998	Finding Graceland	Beatrice Gruman	
1998	Bleach	Gwen	Short film
1999	The Thirteenth Floor	Jane Fuller / Natasha Molinaro	
1999	Cradle Will Rock	Marion Davies	
1999	Sweet and Lowdown	Ellie	
1999	Forever Mine	Ella Brice	
1999	Just Looking	Hedy Coletti	
2000	Zoe Loses It	Amber	Short film
2000	Attraction	Liz	
2000	Get Carter	Audrey	Uncredited
2003	The Shape of Things	Jenny	
2004	Heavy Put-Away	Mary	Short film
2005	The Notorious Bettie Page	Bettie Page	
2006	Puccini for Beginners	Grace	
2007	The Ten	Gloria Jennings	
2007	Trainwreck: My Life as an Idiot	Lynn	
2007	3:10 to Yuma	Alice Evans	
2008	An American Affair	Catherine Caswell	
2008	Tenure	Elaine Grasso	
2014	Laggies	Bethany	
2015	True Story	Karen Hannen	
2015	Anesthesia	Sarah	
2016	Manchester by the Sea	Elise Chandler	
2016	A Family Man	Elise Jensen	
2019	Arara	Grace	
2021	False Positive	Dawn	
2022	Palm Trees and Power Lines	Sandra	
2024	Millers in Marriage	Eve Miller	
2024	The Invisibles	Hanna	
2025	Play Dirty	Grace Webb	
2026	Rain Reign	Julie Caporale	

=== Television ===
Year	Title	Role	Notes
1996	Dead Man's Walk	Maggie	2 episodes
1996	Spin City	Gwen	Episode: "Pride and Prejudice"
1996	Calm at Sunset	Emily	Television film
2000	Picnic	Madge Owens	Television film
2000	The Magnificent Ambersons	Lucy Morgan	Television film
2002	Girls Club	Lynne Camden	9 episodes
2002	Freshening Up	Janelle	Television short
2007	The Valley of Light	Eleanor	Television film
2008	The Memory Keeper's Daughter	Norah Henry	Television film
2008–2009	Life on Mars	Annie Norris	17 episodes
2010–2014	Boardwalk Empire	Gillian Darmody	39 episodes
2015	Mozart in the Jungle	Nina	8 episodes
2016	Chance	Jaclyn Blackstone	10 episodes
2018	Nightflyers	Dr. Agatha Matheson	10 episodes
2018	Yellowstone	Evelyn Dutton	2 episodes
2018	Seven Seconds	Sam Hennessy	3 episodes
2020	The Twilight Zone	Mrs. Warren	Episode: "You Might Also Like"
2020–2023	Perry Mason	Linda	5 episodes
2022	American Gigolo	Michelle	8 episodes
2026	Tulsa King	Amanda Clark	Main cast (season 4)
