= Ted Jordan =

American film and television actor

- Jordan in The Andy Griffith Show, 1966
- Born: Edgar Harrison Friedman Jr. May 23, 1924; Lancaster, Ohio, U.S.
- Died: March 30, 2005 (aged 80); Palm Desert, California, U.S.
- Occupations: Film and television actor
- Years active: 1944–1981
- Spouse: Lili St. Cyr (m. 1955; div. 1959)

Edgar Harrison Friedman Jr. (May 23, 1924 – March 30, 2005) was an American film and television actor. He was best known for playing freight agent Nathan Burke of the American western television series Gunsmoke from 1966 to 1975.

Jordan guest-starred in numerous television programs, including The Virginian, The Andy Griffith Show, Combat!, The High Chaparral, Mission: Impossible, Sky King, Voyage to the Bottom of the Sea and Land of the Giants. He also appeared in numerous films such as Sierra, Cargo to Capetown, Bonanza Town, The Million Dollar Duck, Counterspy Meets Scotland Yard, When Willie Comes Marching Home, Tokyo Joe and Three Little Girls in Blue.

Jordan died on March 30, 2005 in Palm Desert, California, at the age of 80. He was buried at Saint Joseph Cemetery in Lockbourne, Ohio.
