= W. Mott Hupfel III =

American cinematographer

W. Mott Hupfel III (born c. 1967) is an American cinematographer.

A New York University graduate, his mother worked at the Delaware Art Museum in Wilmington, and his father was the vice-president of the Wilmington Trust Company. In 1998 he directed 10 episodes of the TV series Upright Citizens Brigade. Among his films are The American Astronaut (2001), The Notorious Bettie Page (2005), The Savages (2007), and Jack Goes Boating (2010). He was nominated for the Independent Spirit Award for Best Cinematography for The American Astronaut and The Savages. He married Sara Eugenie Goodman, executive director of the New York Women's Film Festival and daughter of the president of Hambro-America Inc, on 7 September 1996.
