= Bettie Page: Dark Angel =

- Bettie Page: Dark Angel DVD cover
- Directed by: Nico Bruinsma
- Written by: Nico Bruinsma
- Produced by: Nico Bruinsma
- Starring: Paige Richards; Dukey Flyswatter
- Cinematography: Daron Keet
- Edited by: Andy Horvitch; Shanna Maurizi
- Music by: Chris Stein; Danny B. Harvey
- Distributed by: Cult Epics
- Release date: 2004
- Running time: 75 minutes
- Language: English

Bettie Page: Dark Angel is a 2004 film directed and produced by Cult Epics founder Nico Bruinsma. Page is played by fetish model Paige Richards. The film premiered at the San Francisco Independent Film Festival in February 2004.

== Plot summary ==
Bettie Page: Dark Angel is a biographical drama based on the career of Bettie Page, a famous American 1950s pin-up and bondage model. Set in New York during 1953–1957, the film recreates six lost fetish/bondage 16mm featurettes she did for Irving Klaw (played by Dukey Flyswatter). Her bondage films and photographs gave her the nickname Dark Angel and also led to a US Senate Committee investigation.

== Cast ==
- Paige Richards as Bettie Page
- Michael Sonye as Irving Klaw (as Dukey Flyswatter)
- Jamie Henkin as Paula Klaw
- Christopher Page as Jack Bradley
- Kirsi Sand as Bunny Yeager
- Clinton Ehrlich as Marvin Greene
- David Maynard as Walterson
- Emily Marilyn as Unknown Model
- Jana Strain as Peggy Raye
- Julie Simone as Model Julie London
- Jeanne Landis as Model Julie Simone
- David Neff as Howard Hughes
- Rob Young as Casting Agent
- Oto Brezina as Sen. Estes Kefauver

== See also ==
- Sadism and masochism in fiction
