= Varietease =

- Varietease DVD cover
- Directed by: Irving Klaw
- Produced by: Irving Klaw
- Starring: Lili St. Cyr; Bettie Page
- Cinematography: Daniel D. Cavelli
- Music by: Ben Blossner; Irma Hollander; Metis
- Release date: 1954
- Running time: 65 minutes
- Country: United States
- Language: English

Varietease is a 1954 American burlesque film and the first such directed by Irving Klaw. According to its plot, the iconic pin-up model Bettie Page performs a burlesque show alongside Lili St. Cyr, Chris La Chris, Vicki Lynn, Bobby Shields, and others.

== Synopsis ==
Varietease was Klaw's first documentary film reflective of burlesque clubs of the 1950s. Master of ceremonies Bobby Shields introduces the film's acts. Bettie Page performs a nudity-free Dance of the Seven Veils but teases in only removing four veils. Lili St. Cyr does four separate sequences, wherein she dresses and undresses to her underwear. Bettie Page returns presenting act cards while performing a few burlesque moves as she presents. Following are a comic, a female impersonator, the Barrow and Rodgers dance team, additional songs, and can-can dancers. The film ends with a pastie-covered reveal of Lili St. Cyr's chest.

== Cast ==
- Lili St. Cyr as herself
- Bettie Page as herself
- Irving Klaw as himself
- Christine Nelson as herself
- Baros & Rogers as themselves
- Cass Franklin as herself
- Chris LaChris as herself
- Monica Lane as herself
- Shelley Leigh as herself
- Vickie Lynn as herself
- Peppe & Roccio as themselves
- Bobby Shields as himself
- Dave Starr as himself
- Twinnie Wallen as herself

== Reception ==
Bettie Page performed a "particularly sexy but amateurish" Dance of the Seven Veils in the film. One performance by female impersonator Vicki Lynn in the film was said to have "crystallized the transgressive potential of the burlesque film." Varietease is one of the "famous compilations" of "classic burlesque shows." The film was rereleased by Something Weird Video in 2006, sharing release with Teaserama. DVD Verdict noted that the films were both performed and staged as if for live audiences but offered: "Still, there is something endlessly fascinating about this old-fashioned flesh fest." In looking at the films 50 years after they were made, it was noted that the comedians were bad, the dance acts "droned on," and only a couple of the songs were mildly amusing. The reviewer stated that while the film would be best appreciated by viewers already fans of St. Cyr and Page, "[t]he stripping is indeed skillful and the ladies are almost always lovely to look at" and continued, "Sure, in 2006 these acts look positively tame. However, back when pornography was a social sin and fornication was for procreation, a glimpse of gam or a peek at some pert personal pillows was the height of honorable horniness."

== Lawsuit ==
The film was the subject of a lawsuit by Page's estate against Something Weird Video, an Oregon company that was marketing videos of the film. Page's estate argued that marketing materials for the video infringed on Page's rights as a celebrity. A U.S. district court ruled against Page's estate because the video company had legitimately obtained all rights to the film and its associated marketing materials.
