= Bettie Page =

American pin-up model (1923–2008)

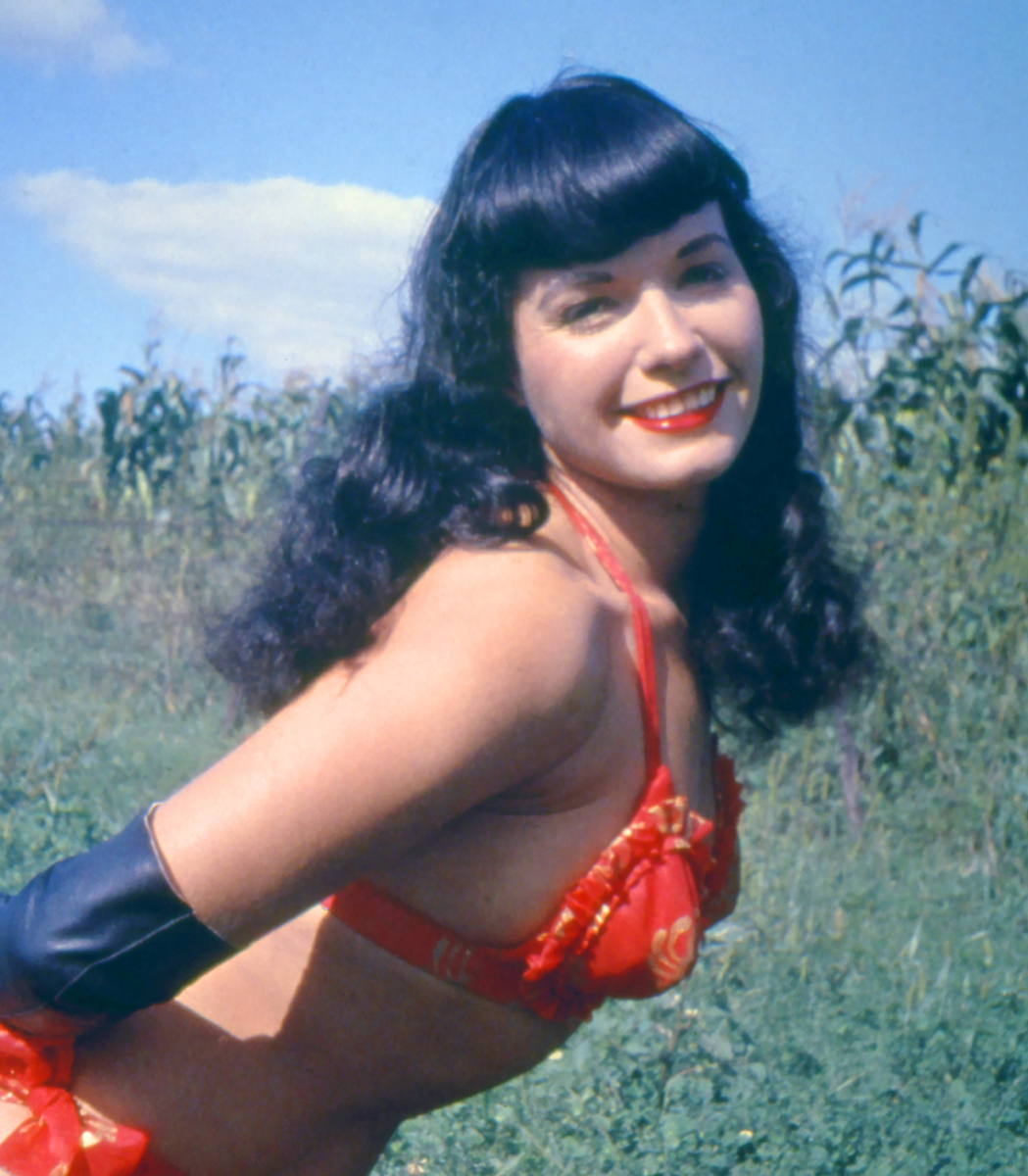
- Page posing for the camera
- Born: Bettie Mae Page; April 22, 1923; Nashville, Tennessee, U.S.
- Died: December 11, 2008 (aged 85); Los Angeles, California, U.S.
- Resting place: Westwood Village Memorial Park Cemetery; 34.0583333°N 118.4408333°W
- Education: Peabody College (part of Vanderbilt University); Multnomah University
- Occupations: Model; actress
- Spouses: William E. Neal (m. 1943; div. 1947); (m. 1963; ann. 1964); Armond Walterson (m. 1958; div. 1963); Harry Lear (m. 1966; div. 1972)

Playboy centerfold appearance
- January 1955
- Preceded by: Terry Ryan
- Succeeded by: Jayne Mansfield

Personal details
- Height: 5 ft 5.5 in (166.4 cm)

Bettie Mae Page (April 22, 1923 – December 11, 2008) was an American model who gained recognition in the 1950s for her pin-up photos. She was often referred to as the "Queen of Pinups": her long jet-black hair, blue eyes, and trademark bangs have influenced artists for generations. After her death, Playboy founder Hugh Hefner called her "a remarkable lady, an iconic figure in pop culture who influenced sexuality, taste in fashion, someone who had a tremendous impact on our society".

A native of Nashville, Tennessee, Page lived in California in her early adult years before moving to New York City to pursue work as an actress. There, she found work as a pin-up model, and she posed for several photographers throughout the 1950s. Page was "Miss January 1955", one of the earliest Playmates of the Month for Playboy magazine. After years in obscurity, she experienced a resurgence of popularity in the 1980s.

In 1959, Page converted to evangelical Christianity and worked for Billy Graham, studying at Bible colleges in Los Angeles and Portland, Oregon, with the intent of becoming a missionary.

Her final years were marked by depression, violent mood swings, and several years in a state psychiatric hospital with paranoid schizophrenia.

== Early life ==
Betty Mae Page, who in childhood began spelling her first name "Bettie", was born in Nashville, Tennessee, in 1923, the second of six children to Walter Roy Page and Edna Mae Pirtle. During her early years, the Page family traveled around the country in search of economic stability. At a young age, she had to face the responsibilities of caring for her younger siblings, particularly after her father was convicted for car theft and spent two years in an Atlanta, Georgia, prison.

Page's parents divorced when she was 10 years old. Her mother worked two jobs; one as a hairdresser (during the day) and the other washing laundry (at night). Unable to care for all her children, Edna placed Bettie, at 10, and her two sisters in a Protestant orphanage for a year. Their father remained in the area, at one point renting a basement room from the cash-strapped Edna. Walter Page said he began sexually molesting Bettie when she was 13 years old.

As a teenager, Page and her sisters tried different makeup styles and hairdos imitating their favorite film stars. She also learned to sew. These skills proved useful, years later, for her pin-up photography, when Page did her own makeup and hair and made her own bikinis and costumes.

A good student and debate team member at Hume-Fogg High School, she was voted "Girl Most Likely to Succeed". On June 6, 1940, Page graduated as the salutatorian of her high school class with a scholarship. She enrolled at George Peabody College (later part of Vanderbilt University) with the intention of becoming a teacher. However, the next fall she began studying acting, hoping to become a film star. At the same time, she got her first job, typing for author Alfred Leland Crabb. Page graduated from Peabody with a Bachelor of Arts degree in 1944.

Shortly before graduating from Hume-Fogg High, Page had met William E. "Billy" Neal, a former rival high school sports star two years older than her. In September 1942, he was drafted into the Army for World War II, and he and Page married on February 18, 1943, before he shipped out. For the next few years, she moved between San Francisco, Los Angeles and Nashville. She and Neal divorced in 1947.

== Modeling career ==
=== Discovery and early work ===
In late 1947, Page moved to New York City, where she hoped to find work as an actress. She supported herself by working a secretarial job at the American Bread Company, near Penn Station. Within days she became the victim of a sexual assault by a group of men, and returned home to Nashville, where she briefly worked for the L & N Railroad. Within weeks, she returned to New York, becoming secretary to a real-estate developer and an insurance broker who shared offices in the Eastern Airlines Building at Rockefeller Plaza.

In 1950, while walking along the Coney Island shore, Bettie met NYPD Officer Jerry Tibbs, who was an avid photographer, and he gave Bettie his card. He suggested she would be a good pin-up model. In exchange for allowing him to photograph her, he would help make up her first pin-up portfolio, free of charge. Tibbs suggested to Bettie that she style her hair with bangs in front, to keep light from reflecting off her high forehead when being photographed. Bangs soon became an integral part of her distinctive look.

In late-1940s America, "camera clubs" were formed to circumvent laws restricting the production of nude photos. These camera clubs existed ostensibly to promote artistic photography, but in reality, many were merely fronts for the making of pornography. Page entered the field of "glamour photography" as a popular camera club model, working initially with photographer Cass Carr. Her lack of inhibition in posing made her a hit, and her name and image became quickly known in the erotic photography industry. In 1951, Bettie's image appeared in men's magazines such as Wink, Titter, Eyeful and Beauty Parade.

=== Early 1950s to 1957: Irving Klaw; film work ===
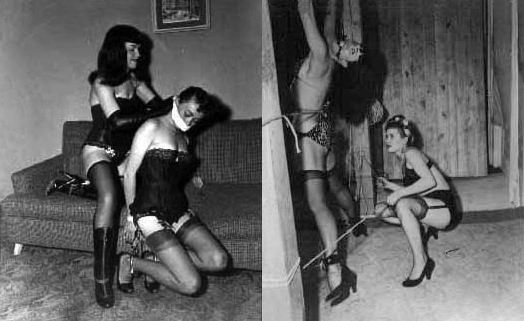
Page appearing in S&M and bondage reels by Irving and Paula Klaw

A video featuring Bettie Page as a slave, lashing out against her mistress (Roz Greenwood) and then getting spanked, 1955

From late 1951 or early 1952 through 1957, she posed for photographer Irving Klaw for mail-order photographs with pin-up and BDSM themes, making her the first famous bondage model. Klaw also used Page in several short, black-and-white 8mm and 16mm "specialty" films, which catered to specific requests from his clientele. These silent one-reel featurettes showed women clad in lingerie and high heels, acting out fetishistic scenarios of abduction, domination, and slave-training; bondage, spanking, and elaborate leather costumes and restraints were included periodically. Page alternated between playing a stern dominatrix, and a helpless victim bound hand and foot.

Klaw also produced a line of still photos taken during these sessions. Some have become iconic images, such as his highest-selling photo of Page—shown gagged and bound in a web of ropes, from the film Leopard Bikini Bound. Although these "underground" features had the same crude style and clandestine distribution as the pornographic "stag" films of the time, Klaw's all-female films (and still photos) never featured any nudity or explicit sexual content. Commenting on the bondage photos and the reputation they afforded her, Page said retrospectively:

They keep referring to me in the magazines and newspapers and everywhere else as the "Queen of Bondage". The only bondage posing I ever did was for Irving Klaw and his sister Paula. Usually every other Saturday he had a session for four or five hours with four or five models and a couple of extra photographers, and in order to get paid you had to do an hour of bondage. And that was the only reason I did it. I never had any inkling along that line. I don't really disapprove of it; I think you can do your own thing as long as you're not hurting anybody else — that's been my philosophy ever since I was a little girl. I never looked down my nose at it. In fact, we used to laugh at some of the requests that came through the mail, even from judges and lawyers and doctors and people in high positions. Even back in the '50s they went in for the whips and the ties and everything else.

In 1953, Page took acting classes at the Herbert Berghof Studio, which led to several roles on stage and television. She appeared on The United States Steel Hour and The Jackie Gleason Show. Her Off-Broadway productions included Time Is a Thief and Sunday Costs Five Pesos. Page acted and danced in the feature-length burlesque revue film Striporama directed by Jerald Intrator in which she was given a brief speaking role. She then appeared in two more burlesque films by Irving Klaw (Teaserama and Varietease). These featured exotic dance routines and vignettes by Page and well-known striptease artists Lili St. Cyr and Tempest Storm. All three films were mildly risqué, but none showed any nudity or overtly sexual content.

In 1954, during one of her annual vacations to Miami, Florida, Page met photographers Jan Caldwell, H. W. Hannau and Bunny Yeager. At that time, Page was the top pin-up model in New York. Yeager, a former model and aspiring photographer, signed Page for a photo session at the now-closed wildlife park Africa U.S.A. in Boca Raton, Florida. The "Jungle Bettie" photographs from this shoot are among her most celebrated. They include nude shots with a pair of cheetahs named Mojah and Mbili. Page herself made the leopard-skin-patterned jungle girl outfit she wore, along with much of her lingerie. A collection of the Yeager photos, and Klaw's, were published in the book Bettie Page Confidential (St. Martin's Press, 1994).

After Yeager sent shots of Page to Playboy founder Hugh Hefner, he selected one to use as the Playmate of the Month centerfold in the January 1955 issue of the two-year-old magazine. The famous photo shows Page, wearing only a Santa hat, kneeling before a Christmas tree holding an ornament and playfully winking at the camera. In 1955, Page won the title "Miss Pinup Girl of the World". She also became known as "The Queen of Curves" and "The Dark Angel". While pin-up and glamour models frequently have careers measured in months, Page was in demand for several years, continuing to model until 1957.

Although she frequently posed nude, she never appeared in scenes with explicit sexual content. In 1957, Page gave "expert guidance" to the FBI regarding the production of "flagellation and bondage pictures" in Harlem.

=== 1958–1992: Retirement; departure from spotlight ===
The reasons reported for Page's departure from modeling vary. Some reports mention the Kefauver Hearings of the United States Senate Special Committee to Investigate Crime in Interstate Commerce as a potential reason, after a young man apparently died during a session of bondage which was rumored to be inspired by images featuring Page. After leaving modeling, Page converted to Christianity and became a born again evangelist on December 31, 1959, while living in Key West, Florida. She recalled in 1998, "When I gave my life to the Lord, I began to think he disapproved of all those nude pictures of me."

Photographer Sam Menning was the last person to photograph a pin-up of Page before her retirement.

On New Year's Eve 1958, during one of her regular visits to Key West, Page attended a service at what is now the Key West Temple Baptist Church. She found herself drawn to the multiracial environment and started to attend on a regular basis. She would, in time, attend three bible colleges, including the Bible Institute of Los Angeles, Multnomah University in Portland, Oregon and, briefly, a Christian retreat known as "Bibletown", part of the Boca Raton Community Church, Boca Raton, Florida.

She dated industrial designer Richard Arbib in the 1950s, and then married Armond Walterson on November 6, 1958; they divorced on October 10, 1963.

During the 1960s, she attempted to become a Christian missionary in Africa, but was rejected for having had a divorce. Over the next few years, she worked for various Christian organizations before settling in Nashville in 1963, and re-enrolled at Peabody College to pursue a master's degree in education, but eventually dropped out. She worked full-time for Rev. Billy Graham. She and first husband Billy Neal remarried very briefly in late 1963 or in 1964, but that marriage was soon annulled.

Bettie Page in the 1955 film Teaserama

She returned to Florida in 1966 and married again, to Harry Lear, on February 14, 1966. but that marriage ended in divorce on January 18, 1972.

She moved to Southern California in October 1978. There she had a nervous breakdown and had an altercation with her landlady. The doctors who examined her diagnosed her with acute schizophrenia, and she spent 20 months in Patton State Hospital in San Bernardino, California. In 1982, after a fight with another landlord, she was arrested for assault, but was found not guilty by reason of insanity and placed under state supervision for eight years. She was released in 1992.

== Revival of public interest ==
In the 1950s, artists Gene Bilbrew and Eric Stanton were among the first to paint Bettie images. In 1979, artist Robert Blue had a show titled Steps Into Space, at a gallery on Melrose Place in Los Angeles, where he showed his collection of Bettie Page paintings. At that time in New York, Olivia De Berardinis had begun painting Bettie for Italian jeans manufacturer Fiorucci. De Berardinis has continued to paint Bettie, and compiled a collection of this artwork in a book titled Bettie Page by Olivia (2006), with a foreword by Hugh Hefner.

In 1976, Eros Publishing Co. published A Nostalgic Look at Bettie Page, a mixture of photos from the 1950s. Between 1978 and 1980, Belier Press published four volumes of Betty Page: Private Peeks, reprinting pictures from the private-camera-club sessions, which reintroduced Page to a new but small cult following. In 1983, London Enterprises released In Praise of Bettie Page — A Nostalgic Collector's Item, reprinting camera-club photos and an old cat fight photo shoot.

A larger cult following was built around Page during the 1980s, of which she was unaware. This renewed attention was focused on her pinup and lingerie modeling rather than those depicting sexual fetishes or bondage. This attention also prompted speculation of what happened to her after the 1950s. The 1990s edition of Book of Lists included Page in a list of once-famous celebrities who had vanished from the public eye.

In the early 1980s, comic-book artist Dave Stevens based the female love interest of his hero Cliff Secord (alias "The Rocketeer") on Page.

By the mid-1980s, artist Olivia De Berardinis noted that women began to frequent her gallery openings sporting Bettie bangs, fetish clothing, and tattoos of Page. She described "black bangs, seamed stockings and snub-nosed 6-inch stilettos. These are Bettie Page signatures. Although the fantasy world of fetish/bondage existed in some form since the beginning of time, Bettie is the iconic figurehead of it all. No star of this genre existed before her. [Marilyn] Monroe had predecessors, Bettie did not."

In 1987, Greg Theakston started a fanzine called The Betty Pages and recounted tales of her life, particularly the camera-club days. Additionally, numerous articles about the missing pop-cultural figure began appearing in the mainstream media. Since almost all of her photos were in the public domain, some entities launched Page-related products.

In a 1993 telephone interview with Lifestyles of the Rich and Famous, Page told host Robin Leach that she had been unaware of the resurgence of her popularity, stating that she was "penniless and infamous". Entertainment Tonight produced a segment on her. Page was living in a group home in Los Angeles. Theakston contacted her and extensively interviewed her for The Betty Page Annuals V.2.

Her brother Jack finally brought her back into public life, explaining, "My son had noticed all the books and calendars and plates being sold with her face on them,...I called her up and said, 'Bettie, there is a chance for you to make money off this'".

In 1993, Jack persuaded Page to pursue royalties through Chicago attorney James L. Swanson, who with Karen Essex wrote the 1996 coffee table book Bettie Page: The Life of a Pin-Up Legend.

Three years later, nearly penniless and failing to receive any royalties, Page fired Swanson.

In 1993, Page signed with Mark Roesler and his Curtis Management Group, later CMG Worldwide. Page occasionally autographed pinups at her agents' offices in Los Angeles, California.

After Jim Silke made a large-format comic featuring Page's likeness, in the 1990s Dark Horse Comics published a comic book based on her fictional adventures. Eros Comics published several Bettie Page titles, including the tongue-in-cheek Tor Love Bettie which comically suggested a romance between Page and wrestler-turned-Ed Wood film actor, Tor Johnson.

In 1996, Page granted a TV interview to entertainment reporter Tim Estiloz for the NBC morning magazine program Real Life. Another biography, The Real Bettie Page: The Truth about the Queen of Pinups (1997) was written by Richard Foster. The book stated that a Los Angeles County Sheriff's police report said Page had paranoid schizophrenia and, at age 56, had stabbed her elderly landlords on the afternoon of April 19, 1979 in an unprovoked attack, during a fit of insanity.

In 1997, E! True Hollywood Story aired a feature on Page titled, Bettie Page: From Pinup to Sex Queen.

In a late-1990s interview, Page stated she would not allow any current pictures of her to be shown because of concerns about her weight. However, in 1997, Page changed her mind and agreed to a television interview for the aforementioned E! True Hollywood Story on the condition that the location of the interview and her face not be revealed (she was shown with her face and dress electronically blacked out). Page allowed a publicity picture to be taken of her for the August 2003 edition of Playboy. In 2006, the Los Angeles Times ran an article headlined "A Golden Age for a Pinup", covering an autographing session at CMG Worldwide. Once again, Page declined to be photographed.

In a 1998 interview, she commented of her career, "I never thought it was shameful. I felt normal. It's just that it was much better than pounding a typewriter eight hours a day, which gets monotonous."

In her last years, she hired a law firm to help her recoup some of the profits being made with her likeness. According to MTV: "Katy Perry's rocker bangs and throwback skimpy jumpers; Madonna's Sex book and fascination with bondage gear; Rihanna's obsession with all things leather, lace and second-skin binding; Uma Thurman in Pulp Fiction; the SuicideGirls website; the Pussycat Dolls; and the entire career of Dita Von Teese" would not have been possible without Page.

In 2011, Page's estate made the Forbes annual list of top-earning dead celebrities, earning $6 million and tied with the estates of George Harrison and Andy Warhol, at 13th on the list. In 2014, Forbes estimated that Page's estate earned $10 million in 2013.

In 2023, local fan Ben Wilkinson successfully advocated for a historical marker honoring Page's life, which was erected in Nashville on what would have been her 100th birthday.

== Death ==
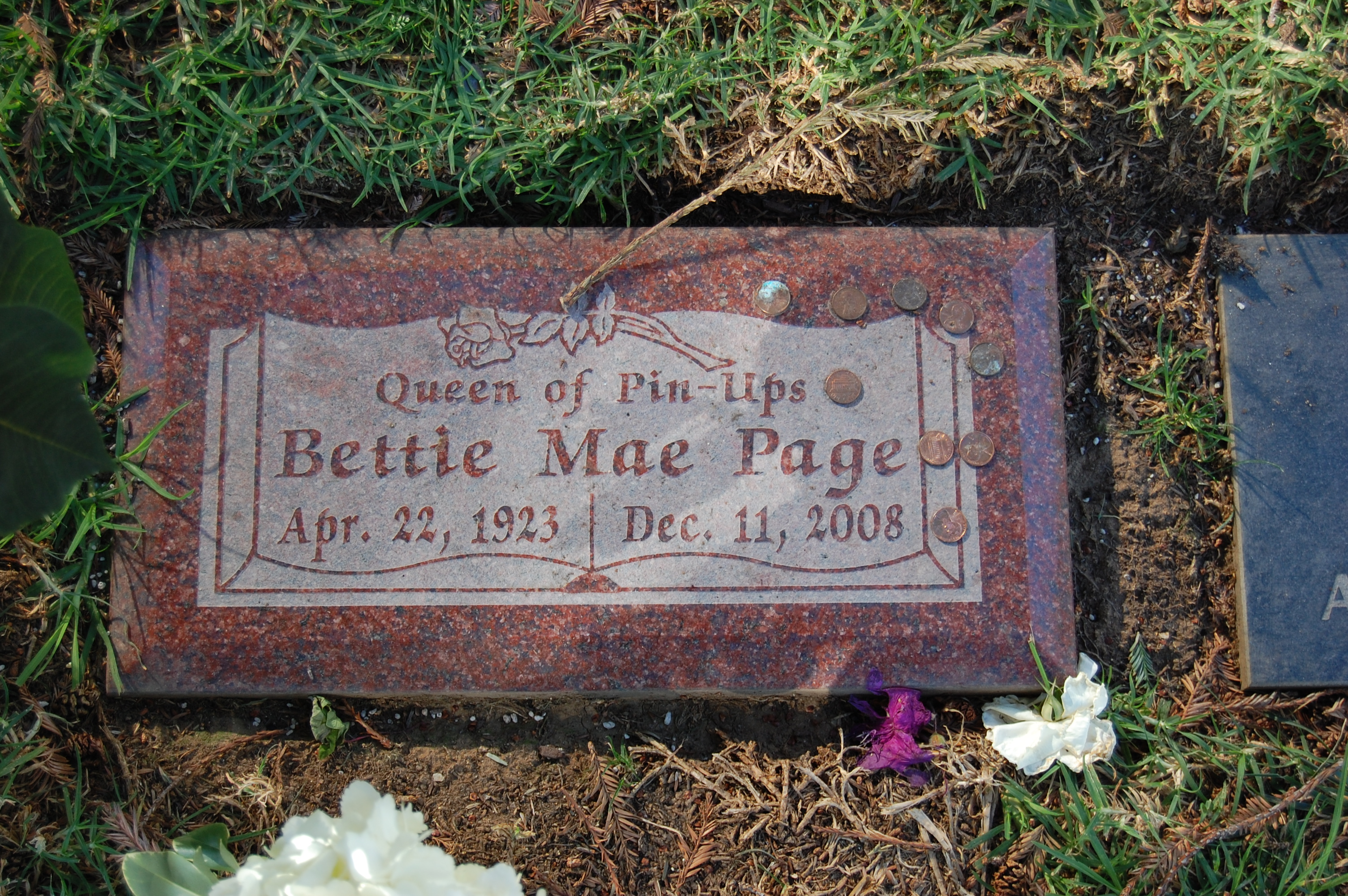
Bettie Page's grave

According to long-time friend and business agent Mark Roesler, Page was hospitalized in critical condition on December 6, 2008. Roesler was quoted by the Associated Press as saying Page had a heart attack and by Los Angeles television station KNBC as claiming Page had pneumonia. Her family eventually agreed to discontinue life support, and she died on December 11, 2008, at the age of 85.

== In popular culture ==
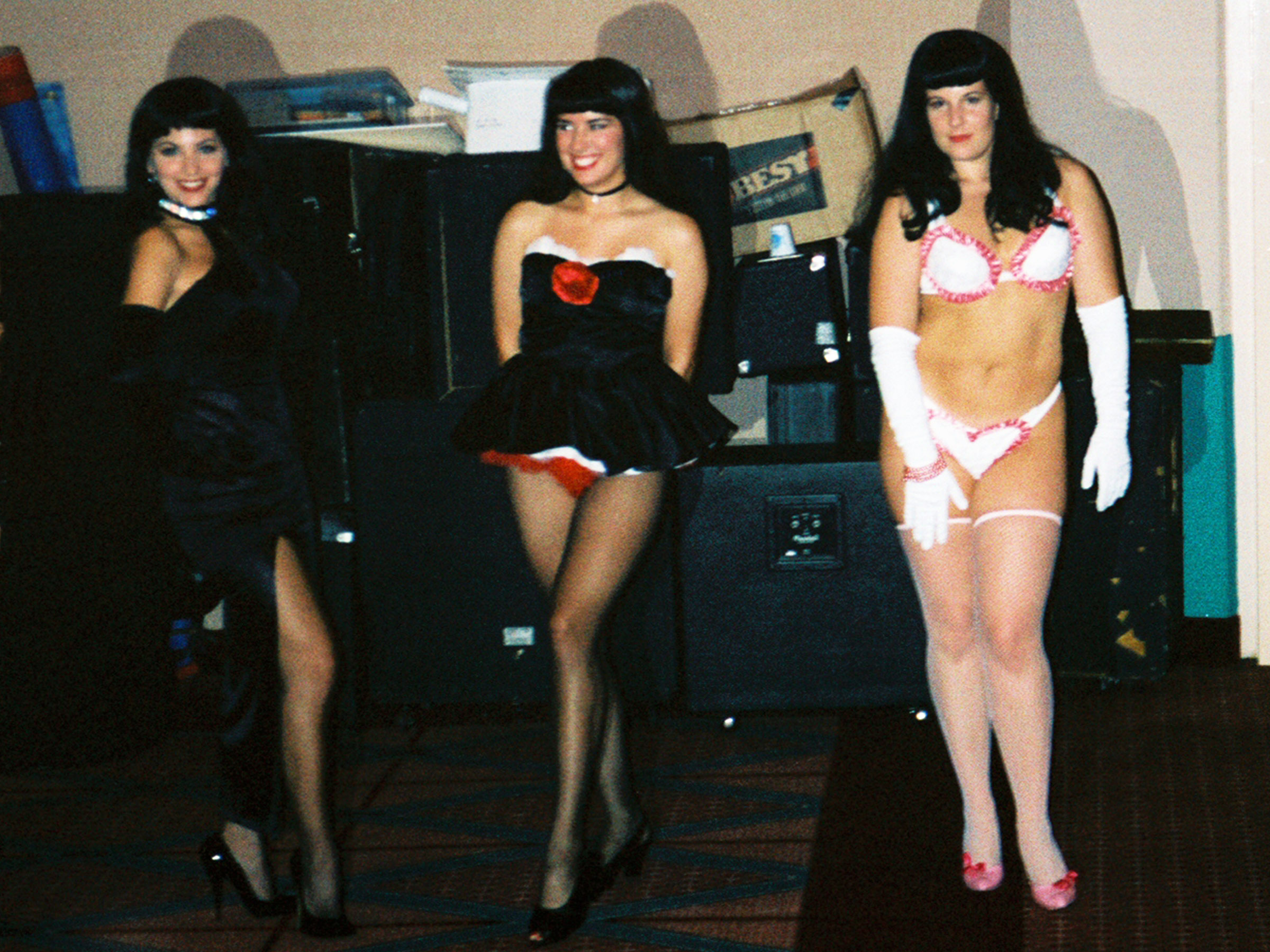
Bettie Page "look-a-like" contest, 1994

=== Fashion and visual art ===
- For its Polynesian-inspired Spring-Summer 2011 ready-to-wear collection, French fashion house Christian Dior styled the hair of its models with Bettie Page as inspiration.
- In Seattle, Washington, a homeowner became the subject of a short-lived controversy when he had an artist friend paint a large mural of Page on the side of his home. The mural is visible from Interstate 5, just south of the 65th Street exit. In 2016, the mural was vandalized, leading to a restoration and the addition of drag star Divine.

=== Film ===
- In 2004, Cult Epics produced the direct-to-DVD biographical film Bettie Page: Dark Angel. Centering on the 1953–1957 Irving Klaw period, it recreates six lost fetish films she did for Klaw. Model Paige Richards plays the title role.
- The Notorious Bettie Page (2005) follows her life from the mid-1930s through the late 1950s. It stars Gretchen Mol as the adult Page. Bonus footage added to the DVD release includes color film from the 1950s of Page playfully undressing and striking various nude poses for the camera.
- In 2012 Bettie Page Reveals All was filmed and premiered, then released nationwide the following year. It was an authorized biographical documentary by director Mark Mori. The documentary included narration from Page herself, culled from more than six hours of interviews with her, as well as commentary from Dita Von Teese, Hugh M. Hefner, Rebecca Romijn, Tempest Storm, Bunny Yeager, Paula Klaw, Mamie Van Doren and Naomi Campbell.

=== Comics ===
- In 1966, comic book writer Robert Kanigher and artist Sheldon Moldoff created DC Comics character Poison Ivy, basing her appearance on Page, including her signature bangs. The DC Comics Bombshells line of figurines launched in 2011 modeled Poison Ivy's look on Page's pin-up appearances.
- In Mickey Spillane's Mike Danger, a comic book series published by Tekno Comix and BIG Entertainment from September 1995 to April 1997, the artist's image of Holly, Mike Danger's assistant was influenced in some measure by Bettie Page's look and hairstyle.
- Bettie Page Comics is a 1996 one-shot comic published by Dark Horse Comics and illustrated by Cary Grazzini, Dave Stevens and Jamie S. Rich, starring pin-up model Bettie Page.
- In 2017, a new Bettie Page comic was created by David Avallone and Colton Worely.
- Dynamite Entertainment announced another Bettie Page comic book series to be released in June, 2023. The series is created by Elisa Ferrari, Luca Blengino and Mirka Andolfo.

=== Video games ===
- In Suda51's video game Lollipop Chainsaw, a pre-order downloadable outfit took inspiration from Bettie Page as a pinup girl outfit, and included her signature haircut with bangs.

=== Music ===
- Beyoncé pays homage to Bettie Page in her music videos for "Video Phone" and "Why Don't You Love Me".
- My Life with the Thrill Kill Kult used a photo of Bettie Page on the cover of their 1991 album Sexplosion!
- American rock musician and former Van Halen frontman David Lee Roth used a photo of Bettie Page on the cover of his 1998 album DLR Band.
- Katy Perry took inspiration from Page for the visuals promoting her album Teenage Dream.

=== Astronomy ===
- Minor planet 184784 is named for her.

== Filmography ==
- Striporama (1953)
- Varietease (1954)
- Teaserama (1955)
- Irving Klaw Bondage Classics Volume I (London Enterprises 1984)
- Irving Klaw Bondage Classics Volume II (London Enterprises 1984)
- The Notorious Bettie Page (2005)
- 100 Girls by Bunny Yeager (Cult Epics 2005), a documentary with behind-the-scenes footage on Yeager's photo sessions with Page and other pin-up models
- Bettie Page: Bondage Queen (Cult Epics 2005)
- Bettie Page: Pin Up Queen (Cult Epics 2005), a compilation of her burlesque dancing performances from Striporama, Varietease, and Teaserama, plus The Exotic Dances of Bettie Page (13 black-and-white dancing and cat-fight shorts)
- Bizarro Sex Loops Volume 4 (Something Weird Video 2007)
- Bizarro Sex Loops Volume 20 (Something Weird Video 2008), Page appears in a set of Irving Klaw bondage reels in a collection of vintage fetish shorts

== See also ==
- Charles Guyette
- John Willie
- Gene Bilbrew
- Fetish fashion

Bettie Page	Jayne Mansfield	(no Playmate)	Marilyn Waltz	Marguerite Empey	Eve Meyer
Janet Pilgrim	Pat Lawler	Anne Fleming	Jean Moorhead	Barbara Cameron	Janet Pilgrim
