= Olivia De Berardinis =

American artist (born 1949)

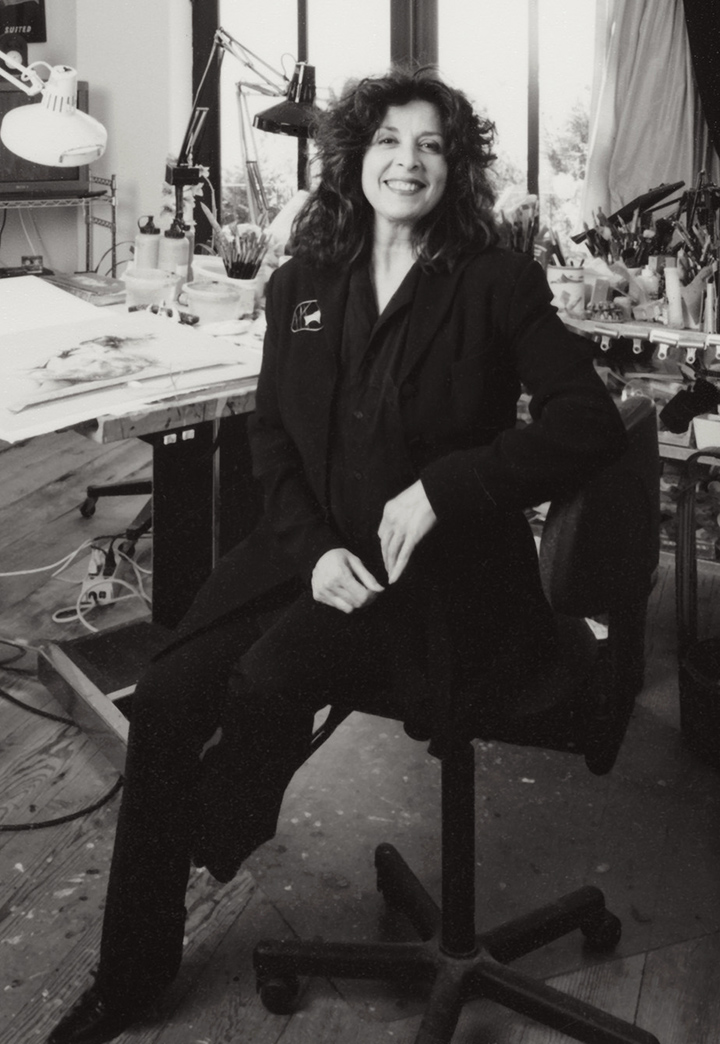
- De Berardinis in her Malibu studio, 2007
- Born: 1949 (age 76–77); United States
- Known for: Illustration, pin-up art
- Website: eolivia.com

Olivia De Berardinis, known professionally as Olivia, is an American artist who is famous for her paintings of women, often referred to as pinup or cheesecake art. She has been working in this genre since the mid-1970s, and became a contributor to Playboy in 1985 which ultimately led to her own monthly pinup page in the magazine.

== Biography ==
De Berardinis was an only child who was schooled in Elizabeth, NJ. Some of her earliest paintings were of her mother. De Berardinis arrived in Manhattan in 1967 where she enrolled in the School of Visual Arts. She resided in New York City's Soho neighborhood from 1970 to 1974, creating Minimalist paintings. De Berardinis was one of the new artists introduced in the Second Annual Contemporary Reflections 1972–73, of the Aldrich Museum of Contemporary Art in Ridgefield, Connecticut. She was also presented as one of 18 new artists in the "Tenth Anniversary, the Larry Aldrich Museum of Contemporary Art 1964-74".

By 1975, financial pressures forced De Berardinis to seek out commercial art work and she started painting women in explicit drawings for men's magazines. In 1985 she started to contribute to Playboy magazine. By June 2004, she was given her own monthly pinup page for the magazine that continued for many years, often appearing with captions written by Hugh Hefner.

De Berardinis uses an airbrush to generate her figures. Her female pin-ups were released in a digital collection on CD-ROM in 1990, and early copies of the program MacPaint had an Easter egg that led to the presentation of her Zebra lady.

She was called the "leading female pinup artist" in a 2001 guide on pornography. In 2004, news articles noted De Berardinis was "one of the few female artists to achieve fame" in the genre of pinup art, and her art can sell for up to $75,000. She started creating paintings of 1950s pinup model Bettie Page in 1978, and would continue to do so for twenty years. De Berardinis' called Page her favorite model, and presented her in a variety of poses. Other people she used as models included Anna Nicole Smith, Holly Madison, Mamie Van Doren, Margaret Cho, and Courtney Love.

De Berardinis' artwork has been shown in art galleries throughout the United States, including a boutique focused on Bettie Page.

== Awards and honors ==
In 1998 she received awards for the Best Cover/Illustration for a magazine for her 1997 cover for the Heavy Metal and an award for artistic achievement from the Chesley Awards for science fiction and fantasy art.

== Personal life ==
In 1979, she married Joel Beren. In 1987, they moved from Manhattan, New York to Malibu, California, where they reside as of 2011.

== Selected works ==
- Beauties Beasts, by Olivia De Berardinis and Jordu Schell, (Street Date: Feb 1, 2017), ISBN 978-1-61404-017-0
- Malibu Cheesecake: The Pinup Art of Oliva, 2011, ISBN 0-929643-30-5
- Bettie Page by Olivia, 2006, ISBN 0-929643-25-9
- American Geisha: The Art Of Olivia III, 2003, ISBN 0-929643-15-1
- Cheesecake Chronicles Volume 1: Art of Olivia, 2000, ISBN 0-929643-12-7
- Second Slice: Art of Olivia II, 1997, ISBN 0-929643-07-0
- Let Them Eat Cheesecake: The Art Of Olivia, 1993, ISBN 0-929643-06-2
