= Georgia Sothern =

American burlesque performer (1913–1981)

Georgia Sothern (1913–1981), born Hazel Anderson, was a burlesque dancer and vaudeville performer. She was known for her striptease performances. She gave an interview to The Harvard Crimson during a trip to the Old Howard Athenaeum in Boston during 1939. She toured New York Philadelphia, Boston, Buffalo, and Miami. She was a red-head. One of her performances was captured in a Film Theatarettes short film. She wrote her memoir titled Georgia: A Life in Burlesque. She had a series of marriages.

She was born in Georgia and began performing at 13. Advertising posters brought large crowds to her shows around the U.S. One of the songs she performed to was the uptempo "Hold that Tiger" performed by an orchestra accompanying the show. She was friends with fellow performer Gypsy Rose Lee. Sothern's performances were frenzies of fast-paced gyrating and disrobing. She considered fellow Minsky star stripper Gypsy Rose Lee and comedian Rags Ragland (whom she called "Ragged," a pet name, in her memoir) close friends.
