= Striporama =

1953 film

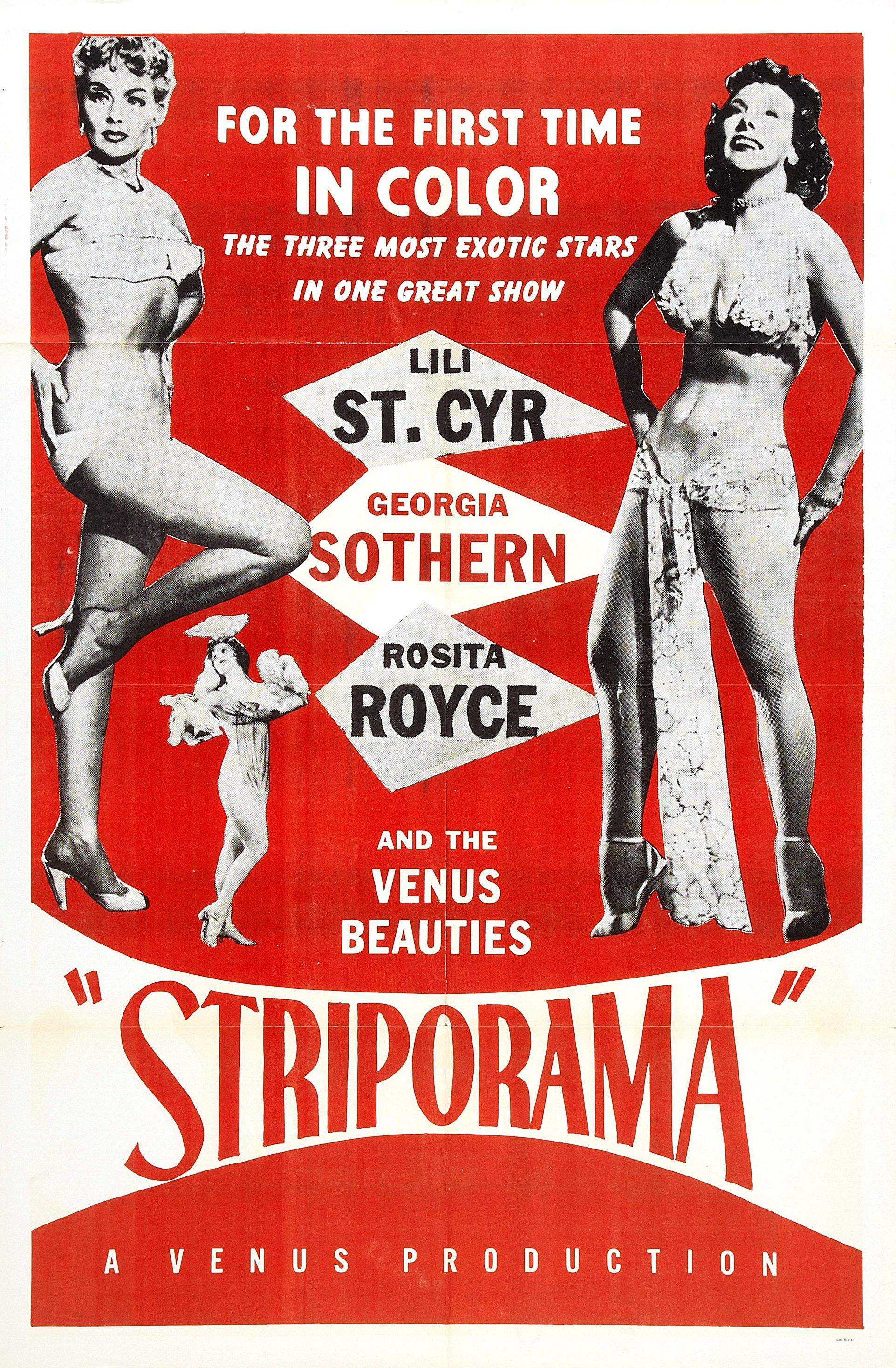
- Theatrical release poster
- Directed by: Jerold Intrator
- Written by: Alan Bodian
- Produced by: Martin J. Lewis
- Starring: Georgia Sothern; Lili St. Cyr; Bettie Page; Jeanne Carmen
- Cinematography: John S. Carrol
- Edited by: Stanley Kotis
- Distributed by: Fine Arts Films
- Release date: October 2, 1953
- Running time: 70 minutes
- Country: United States
- Language: English

Striporama (also known as Striporama of Burlesque) is a 1953 American comedy film directed by Jerald Intrator and starring a number of burlesque comedy, dance and striptease acts popular during the early 1950s including Georgia Sothern, Lili St. Cyr, Bettie Page and Jeanne Carmen.

== Plot ==
A meeting of the "Council of Culture" is taking place in New York City. The council is collecting various art forms for inclusion in a time capsule, However, the council members refuse to consider having mention of burlesque entertainment in their time capsule. News of the decisions reaches a trio of burlesque comics (Jack Diamond, Mandy Kay and Charles Harris), who disrupt the council's meeting by imitating gangsters. The three funnymen take out a movie projector to offer evidence of the artistic value of burlesque entertainment. The remainder of the film is a plotless revue that features such acts as stripper Rosita Royce dancing with a number of trained birds, the Apache-style dance duo of Marinette and Andre, a male bodybuilder dubbed "Mr. America" who flexes his muscles and plays the harmonica while balancing a blonde woman on his shoulders, a number of routines featuring solo women (including Lili St. Cyr) in various acts of undressing, and several comedy sketches including Diamond, Kay and Harris.

== Cast (as themselves) ==
- Georgia Sothern
- Jack Diamond
- Jeanne Carmen as Venus Beauty
- Lili St. Cyr
- Mandy Kay
- Rosita Royce
- Charles Harris
- The Venus Beauties
- Marinette and Andre
- Bettie Page
- Pat Lombard
- Nola Lee
- Betty Tunell
- Doris MacKenzie

== Production ==
Striporama was filmed in color, which was unusual for low-budget burlesque revue films. The production also offered the only color footage of Bettie Page in a speaking role. In the film, Page appears twice: in a comic sequence where she is the shared dream of roommates Diamond and Kay, and later as a harem girl who enjoyed an extended bubble bath. Striporama also saw an early appearance by actress Jeanne Carmen, who had a dialogue-free bit part as a streetwalker that circled the Marinette and Andre dance number.

== Release ==
Striporama was originally released in adults-only theaters that specialized in exploitation films.

== Reception ==
In a contempary reviewVariety wrote: "Striporama is the closest thing to a burlesque show, placed on celluloid, that has been concocted of late, It has all the moss-covered burley comedy skits and routines, and also the strippers and a line of show gals, latter being surprisingly comely. Color of a sort has been added. This all adds up to a very strange conglomeration, but it will do business via the readily exploitable stripper angle. This is one of the few so-called burley pictures that even partly lives up to its sexy lobby display. Some of the stripping sequences have been done with liberal use of closeups. A few of the sexy incidents and the gags are put over with all the adroitness of a sledgehammer. A few of the strippers suffer from being captured too closeup. One of the best parts of this is termed a specialty, "Cinderella's Love Lesson," which is merely Lili St. Cyr doing a modified, original strip. Of the principal strip artists, Rosita Royce and Georgia Sothern shape best. Jack Diamond plays straight, with Mandy Kay and Charles Harris handling the burlesque comic routines."

== Rediscovery ==
Over the years, the last five minutes of original footage became lost. As a public domain film, it had been available from several home video labels. In May 2001, the film had a theatrical re-release in New York City.

== Modern appraisal ==
Critics who reviewed Striporama nearly a half-century after it was created compared its rediscovery to its time capsule plot device.

David Sterritt, writing in the Christian Science Monitor, noted the film was “quite tame despite its lurid title, containing little that would push the boundaries of today's PG-13 rating.”

Michael Atkinson, writing in The Village Voice, found the film “occupying a nudity-free yet salacious middle ground between, say, Singin' in the Rain (the “Beautiful Girl” fashion show is echoed here) and progressive seaminess like Ed Wood and Stephen Apostolof's Orgy of the Dead.”

Armond White, reviewing the film for the New York Press, considered the film “a shabby camp experience, but as a relic of what show business and movies used to be, it instructs one on changing tastes in sex and humor.”
