= Tempest Storm =

American burlesque dancer (1928–2021)

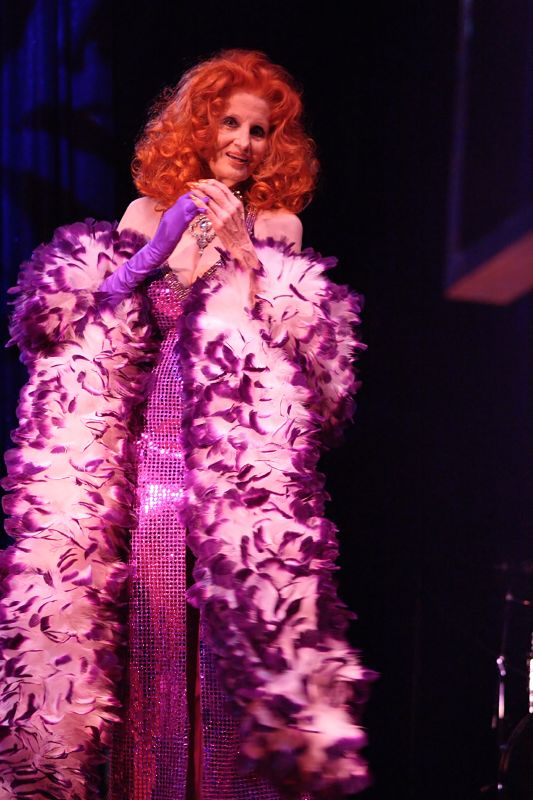
- Storm at the Miss Exotic World Pageant, 2006
- Born: Annie Blanche Banks; February 29, 1928; Eastman, Georgia, U.S.
- Died: April 20, 2021 (aged 93); Las Vegas, Nevada, U.S.
- Other names: Queen of Exotic Dancers
- Occupations: Dancer; actress
- Years active: 1951–2012
- Spouse: Herb Jeffries (m. 1959; div. 1967)
- Children: 1

Tempest Storm (born Annie Blanche Banks; February 29, 1928 – April 20, 2021), also dubbed "The Queen Of Exotic Dancers," was an American burlesque star, stripper and motion picture actress. Along with Lili St. Cyr, Sally Rand and Blaze Starr, she was one of the best-known burlesque performers of the 1950s, 1960s and 1970s. Her career as an exotic dancer spanned more than 60 years and she was still performing in the early 21st century.

== Early life ==
Tempest Storm was born Annie Blanche Banks on February 29, 1928, in Eastman, Georgia. She left school in seventh grade, and in 2016, she revealed that she had been sexually abused around that time. At 14, she worked as a waitress in Columbus, Georgia, where she quickly married a U.S. Marine in order to emancipate herself from her parents; she had the marriage annulled after 24 hours. At 15, she married a Columbus shoe salesman, whose sister worked with her at a hosiery mill. Storm said in a 1968 interview with film reviewer Roger Ebert that after six months in that marriage, "I just left one day. I still had it in my mind to go to Hollywood. I couldn't get it out of my system."

== Burlesque career ==
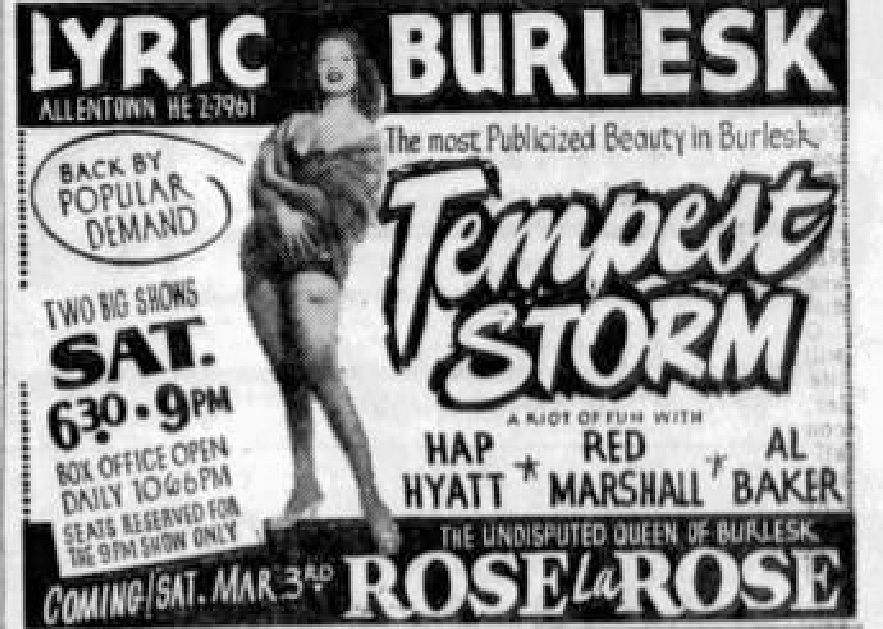
An early poster advertising Tempest Storm (1956)

In Los Angeles circa 1945 at age 17, Storm worked as a carhop waitress at Simon's Drive-In and then as a cocktail waitress, though still underage. A patron suggested she consider striptease as a profession, and arranged an audition with Follies Theater talent manager Lillian Hunt. Three weeks after being hired as a chorus dancer at $40 a week (equivalent to $699 in 2024), Storm accepted a promotion to $60 (equivalent to $1,048 in 2024) as a stripper. A week afterward, she recalled in 1968, Hunt said she needed a stage name:

I asked her if she had any suggestions. She said, what about Tempest Storm? I asked her if she had any other suggestions. Well, she said, what about Sunny Day? Well, I said, I guess it might as well be Tempest Storm.

Annie Blanche Banks legally changed her name to Tempest Storm in 1957, one of the few strippers to have done so.

Tempest Storm as seen in the 1955 movie Teaserama

Storm was a regular performer for many years at El Rey, a burlesque theater in Oakland, California, as well as at clubs around the United States, including in Las Vegas. She was featured in numerous men's magazines and burlesque movies, including French Peep Show (1950), Paris After Midnight (1951), Striptease Girl (1952), Teaserama (1955), and Buxom Beautease (1956).

In 1953, she moved to Portland, Oregon, and worked at the Star Theater. A few months later she moved to the Capital Theater down the street after her then-husband, John Becker, bought it. The owner of the Star then brought Becker's ex-wife, and rival burlesque star, Arabelle Andre to the Star to perform as "John's Other Wife". This sparked a "burlesque war" that made it into the pages of Life magazine on November 30, 1953.

In 1954, Storm was restrained from billing herself as the "$50,000 Hollywood Treasure Chest" following a successful suit brought by the "Treasure Chest Girl" Evelyn West.

== Retirement ==
Storm told her life story to writer Bill Boyd, whose transcriptions of her dictations formed the 1987 book Tempest Storm: The Lady Is a Vamp. She was inducted into the Burlesque Hall of Fame, where one of her G-strings is part of the museum's display.

Storm officially retired from regular performance in 1995 at the age of 67, but continued making occasional stage performances. In 1996, she headlined Vaudeville Follies, produced by Keith Evans, at the Cal State Northridge Student Union. In 1999, she stripped in San Francisco's O'Farrell Theatre to mark the club's 30-year anniversary. Mayor Willie Brown declared a "Tempest Storm Day" in her honor. She also performed at the annual Burlesque Hall of Fame Pageant events at least through 2010.

She appears in the 2016 Nimisha Mukerji's documentary film Tempest Storm.

== Personal life ==
Storm was married four times. Her first two marriages were short-lived and took place when she was in her early to mid-teens. The first of these marriages was annulled after one day. Her third marriage was to John Becker, who bought a burlesque theater for Storm. Her fourth marriage was to Herb Jeffries, film and television actor as well as a popular music and jazz singer-songwriter, known for his baritone voice. The couple had one daughter, Patricia Ann Jeffries. The marriage to Jeffries, according to the New York Times, "broke midcentury racial taboos, costing her work."

Storm commented on her final two marriages thusly, "A guy marries a girl in this business and he thinks he can handle it. They love you when you’re engaged, but they can’t handle it when you’re married. All of a sudden they want you to wear dresses all the way up to your neck."

She resided in Las Vegas, Nevada, where she died on April 20, 2021, aged 93, following a short illness.

== See also ==
- Great Canadian Burlesque
