= Bunny Yeager =

American photographer and pin-up model (1929–2014)

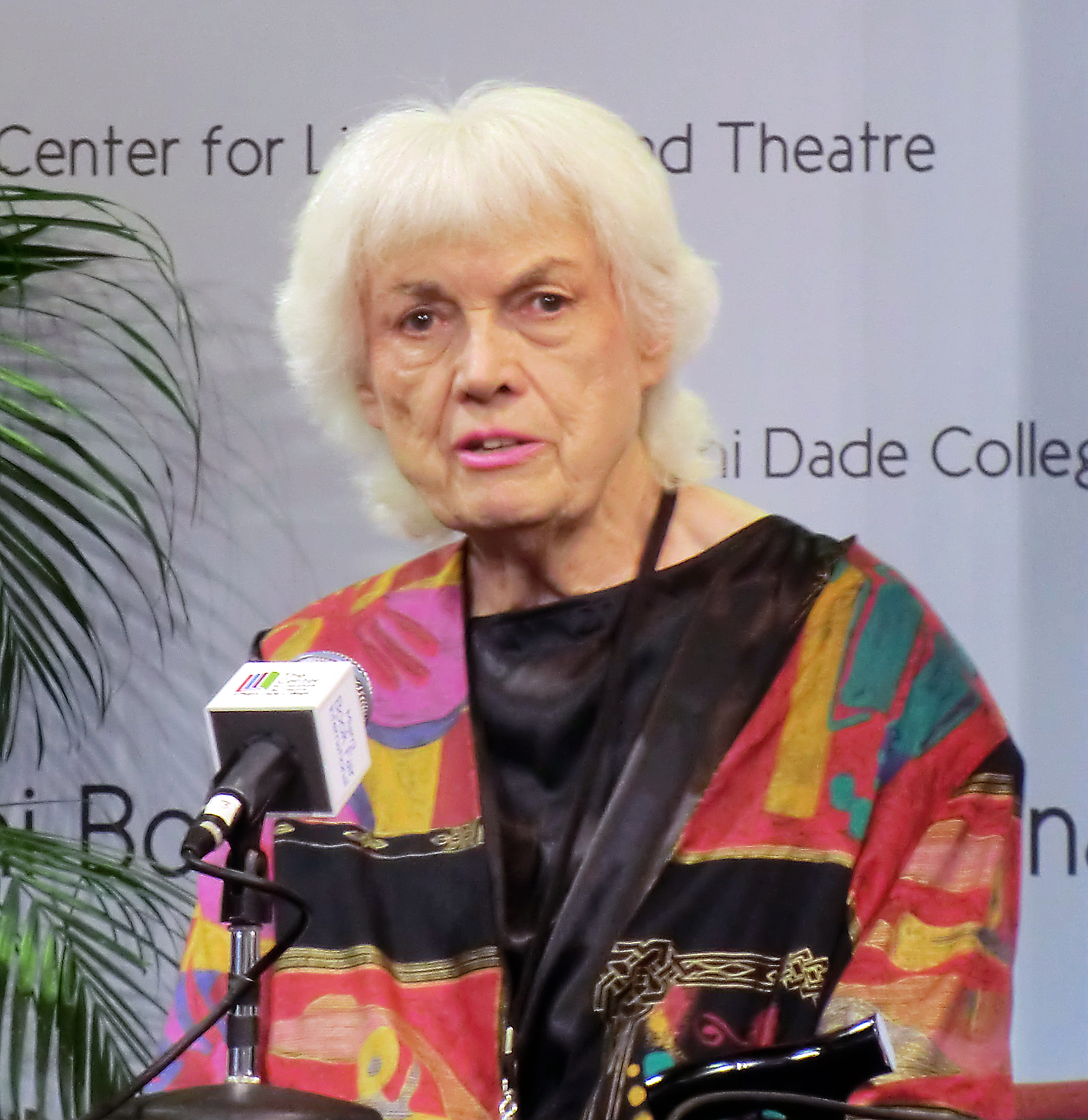
- Yeager in 2012
- Born: Linnea Eleanor Yeager; March 13, 1929; Wilkinsburg, Pennsylvania, U.S.
- Died: May 25, 2014 (aged 85); North Miami, Florida, U.S.
- Education: Miami Edison High School
- Occupations: Photographer; model; actress; author
- Spouses: Bud Irwin (m. 1950; died 1977) Harry William Schaefer (m. 1978; died 2002)
- Children: 2

Linnea Eleanor "Bunny" Yeager (March 13, 1929 – May 25, 2014) was an American photographer, pin-up model, actress and author.

== Early life and career ==
Linnea Eleanor Yeager was born in the Pittsburgh suburb of Wilkinsburg, Pennsylvania, to Raymond Conrad and Linnea (née Sherlin) Yeager on March 13, 1929. Her family moved to Florida when she was 17. She adopted the nickname "Bunny" from Lana Turner's character Bunny Smith in the 1945 movie Week-End at the Waldorf. The nickname has also been attributed to her portrayal of the Easter Bunny in a high school play.

She graduated from Miami Edison High School and enrolled at the Coronet Modeling School and Agency. She won numerous local beauty pageants including in rapid succession Queen of Miami, Florida Orchid Queen, Miss Trailercoach of Dade County, Miss Army & Air Force, Miss Personality of Miami Beach, Queen of the Sports Carnival and Cheesecake Queen of 1951. Yeager became one of the most photographed models in Miami. Photos of Yeager appeared in over 300 newspapers and magazines.

Yeager designed and sewed many of the outfits she and her models wore, at one time boasting that she never wore the same outfit twice while modeling. She designed and produced hundreds of bikinis when the two-piece swimsuit was a new fashion item and is credited with its popularity in America. Bruno Banani, the German fashion company, has developed a line of swimwear based on Yeager's designs from the 1950s.

Yeager entered photography to save money by copying her modeling photographs, enrolling in a night class at a vocational school in 1953. Her career as a professional photographer began when a picture of Maria Stinger, taken for her first school assignment, was sold to Eye magazine for the cover of the March 1954 issue. She became a technically skilled photographer known for her early use of the fill flash technique to lighten dark shadows when shooting in bright sun. Yeager was one of the first photographers to photograph her models outdoors with natural light. Matt Schudel wrote in The Washington Post that her images were vivid and dynamic, going on to say, "She favored active poses and a direct gaze at the camera lens, in what could be interpreted alternately as playful innocence or pure lust."

She met Bettie Page in 1954, and took most of the photographs of her that year. During their collaboration she took over 1,000 pictures of Page. Along with photographer Irving Klaw, Yeager played a role in helping to make Page famous, particularly with her photos in Playboy magazine. American Photo magazine described Yeager's work with Page as "a body of imagery that remains some of the most memorable — and endearing — erotica on record" in a 1993 article. The most famous images of Page by Yeager include the January 1955 Playboy centerfold in which she kneels wearing only a Santa hat while hanging a silver ornament on a Christmas tree and a series of photographs with a pair of live cheetahs.

Yeager was a very prolific and successful pinup photographer in the 1950s and 1960s, so much so, that her work was described as ubiquitous in that era. She continued to work with Playboy, shooting six centerfolds — Bettie Page (January 1955), Lisa Winters (December 1956), Myrna Weber (August 1958), Joyce Nizzari (December 1958), Cindy Fuller (May 1959), and Sandra Settani (April 1963) — in addition to covers and pictorial spreads. She discovered Lisa Winters, the first Playmate of the Year. Yeager also appeared in the magazine as a model five times. One appearance with the headline, "Queen of the Playboy Centerfolds", was photographed by Hugh Hefner.

Her work was also published in mainstream magazines including Cosmopolitan, Esquire, Pageant, Redbook and Women's Wear Daily. The famous still images she took of Ursula Andress emerging from the water on the beach in Jamaica for the 1962 James Bond film Dr. No are probably her best known bikini photographs. She discovered many models. In the 1970s as men's magazines became more anatomically graphic Yeager largely stopped photographing for them, saying they were somewhat "smutty" and that, "They had girls showing more than they should." In 1998 she stated, "The kind of photographs they wanted was something I wasn't prepared to do."

== Later career ==
An exhibition titled "Beach Babes Bash" in the early 1990s at the Center for Visual Communication (at that time located in Coral Gables, Florida) featured photographs by Yeager of models from Miami on the beach from the 1950s. Another exhibit at the same gallery featuring Yeager's work was titled "Sex Sirens of the Sixties." In 1992 Playboy published a retrospective of her work titled "The Bettie Boom". Since 2002, Yeager's work has been exhibited in contemporary art galleries.

In early 2010, The Andy Warhol Museum held the first major museum exhibition of Yeager's work. The exhibit, "The Legendary Queen of the Pin Up", featured her self-portraits, some from her book How I Photograph Myself published by A.S. Barnes & Co. in 1964. "The Fabulous Bunny Yeager" an exhibit in 2011 at the Harold Golen Gallery in Miami also featuring self-portraits by Yeager was of photographs that had not been exhibited previously. Also in 2011 Helmut Schuster curated an exhibition for Art Basel at the Dezer Schauhalle in Miami titled "Bunny Yeager: Retrospective to the Future" featuring over 200 of Yeager's photos. Included were some images that had not been shown before of models including Bettie Page.

In 2012 Bunny Yeager had two exhibitions in Germany, "Funland" at Gallery Schuster Potsdam and "Femme Fatale" in December 2012 at Gallery Schuster Berlin.

The Museum of Art Fort Lauderdale held a 2013 exhibit, "Bunny Yeager: Both Sides of the Camera" featuring her photographs of herself, Page, and model Paz de la Huerta. The exhibit also included some of Yeager's first new pictures in twenty years. Yeager had a show at the Sofia Vault in Sofia, Bulgaria in October 2013. The Gavlak Gallery in Palm Beach, Florida put on an exhibit, "Bunny Yeager: Selections from How I Photograph Myself" in 2014. The Sin City Gallery in Las Vegas held a posthumous exhibit, "Bunny's Bombshells", from June 5 to July 20 2014.

She had her own studio in the Wynwood Art District of Miami, part of the Center for Visual Communication. There is a "Bunny Yeager Lounge" in Berlin which is open to the public and shows photos, memorabilia and movies. Yeager was also founding editor and publisher of a trade magazine for entertainment professionals, Florida Stage & Screen. As of 1998 her 24 books had sold over 1 million copies.

== Personal life and death ==
Bunny Yeager was married twice, first to Arthur Irwin who died in 1977 and then to Harry Schaefer who died in 2000. She had two daughters, Lisa and Cherilu.

Yeager died on May 25, 2014, of congestive heart failure at age 85 in North Miami, Florida.

== Legacy ==
Yeager's obituary in The Miami Herald called her "one of the country’s most famous and influential photographers". She has been cited as influencing many artists and photographers including Diane Arbus, Cindy Sherman and Yasumasa Morimura. Arbus called her, "the world’s greatest pinup photographer". In The New York Times, Margalit Fox wrote, "She is widely credited with helping turn the erotic pinup — long a murky enterprise in every sense of the word — into high photographic art." Her obituary in The Independent titled, "Bunny Yeager: Pin-up who moved behind the camera to take influential, iconic shots of Bettie Page and Ursula Andress" called her photographic technique pioneering and influential. The Washington Post reported she "helped define [the] art of erotic photography".

Yeager is credited with helping to popularize the bikini in America. The inspiration for the term "cheesecake" in reference to scantily clad women has been attributed to Yeager. Her books, including Photographing the Female Figure which sold over 300,000 copies, have influenced several generations of photographers.

== Media appearances and depictions ==
On July 14, 1957, Yeager appeared on What's My Line?, stumping the panel. She was also on I've Got a Secret and To Tell the Truth. She was a guest on The Tonight Show Starring Johnny Carson in 1966 to discuss her book, How I Photograph Myself. In 1968 she played the role of a Swedish masseuse opposite Frank Sinatra in Lady In Cement. She had bit parts in over half a dozen films including Tony Rome, Midnight Cowboy, Porky's, Dogs of War, Absence of Malice, Harry & Son and The Mean Season. Yeager also had small roles in a number of television series including Miami Vice and made occasional appearances singing in Miami nightclubs.

Yeager was played by Sarah Paulson in the 2005 film The Notorious Bettie Page. She was also featured on a 2006 CNN story about the 60th anniversary of the bikini. In 2005, Cult Epics released the DVD 100 Girls by Bunny Yeager, a documentary with behind-the-scenes footage on Yeager's photo sessions with Page and other pin-up models. Naked Ambition, a 2023 documentary film, describes Yeager's career as pinup girl and photographer, and includes commentary from Dita Von Teese, Bruce Weber, and Larry King.

== Books ==
- Photographing the Female Figure. Greenwich, CT: Fawcett. 1957. OCLC 857095939.
- The Diane Weber Album. Compiled by George Harrison Marks. London: Kamera. 1959. OCLC 774607072.
- Bunny Yeager's Photo Studies. Louisville, KY: Whitestone. 1960. OCLC 61235675.
- How to Take Figure Photos. Louisville, KY: Whitestone. 1962. OCLC 504087525.
- Bunny Yeager's Art of Glamour Photography. Philadelphia: Chilton. 1962. OCLC 78679674.
- How I Photograph Nudes. New York: A.S. Barnes. 1963. OCLC 1291129.
- How to Photograph the Figure. Louisville, KY: Whitestone. 1963.
- How I Photograph Myself. New York: A.S. Barnes. 1964. OCLC 9073319.
- ABC's of Figure Photography. Louisville, KY: Whitestone. 1964. OCLC 429407.
- 100 Girls: New Concept in Glamour Photography. South Brunswick, NJ: A.S. Barnes. 1965. OCLC 9113119.
- —; Floreani, Tony (1965). Drawing the Human Figure Using Photographs. New York: A.S. Barnes. OCLC 876830405.
- Camera in the Caribbean. Louisville, KY: Whitestone. 1965.
- Camera in Jamaica. London: Yoseloff. 1966. OCLC 810724774.
- Camera in Mexico. Greenwich, CT: Whitestone. 1967. OCLC 1975709.
- The 100 Calorie Miracle Diet. New York: Pinnacle. 1975. OCLC 3462112.
- The Amazing 600 Calorie Model's Diet. West Nyack, NY: Parker. 1980. ISBN 9780130237705.
- Bettie Page Confidential. New York: St. Martin's. 1994. ISBN 0312109407.
- —; Kroll, Eric (1994). Bunny's Honeys (in English, French, and German). Cologne, DE: Taschen. ISBN 9783822893296.
- Bunny Yeager. 30 Postcards. Vol. 67. Cologne, DE: Taschen. 1995. ISBN 9783822888773.
- Betty Page. 30 Postcards. Vol. 78. Cologne, DE: Taschen. 1996. ISBN 9783822885062.
- Peepshow: 1950s Pin-ups in 3D. Hombrechtikon, CH: Olms. 2001. ISBN 9783283004293.
- Bunny Yeager's Pin-up Girls of the 1950s. Atglen, PA: Schiffer. 2002. ISBN 9780764314735.
- Bikini Girls of the 1960s. Atglen, PA: Schiffer. 2002. ISBN 9780764317354.
- Bunny Yeager's Bikini Girls of the 1950s. Atglen, PA: Schiffer. 2004. ISBN 0764320025.
- Bunny Yeager's Pin-up Girls of the 1960s. Atglen, PA: Schiffer. 2005. ISBN 9780764323348.
- Bunny Yeager's Flirts of the Fifties. Atglen, PA: Schiffer. 2007. ISBN 978-0764326370.
- Striptease Artists of the 1950s. Atglen, PA: Schiffer. 2008. ISBN 9780764328008.
- Femmes Fatales of the 1950s. Atglen, PA: Schiffer. 2008. ISBN 9780764330308.
- Bunny Yeager's Bouffant Beauties. Atglen, PA: Schiffer. 2009. ISBN 9780764332258.
- Bunny Yeager's Beautiful Backsides. Schiffer. 2012. ISBN 9780764339639.
- Mason, Petra (11 September 2012). Bunny Yeager's Darkroom: Pin-up Photography's Golden Era. Foreword by Dita Von Teese; photographs by Bunny Yeager l year 2012 l Rizzoli. ISBN 9780847838554.

== Filmography ==
Year	Title	Role	Notes
1963	Bunny Yeager's Nude Camera	Herself	
1963	Intimate Diary of Artists' Models	Herself	
1964	Bunny Yeager's Nude Las Vegas	Herself	
1965	Nudes on Tiger Reef	Herself	
1968	Lady in Cement	Bunny Fjord - Swedish masseuse	Uncredited
1984	Harry & Son	Marina Bar Waitress	
