= Drink the Sea – The Remixes =

Drink The Sea - The Remixes
- Album cover for Volume 1

Studio album by The Glitch Mob
- Released: January 13, 2011
- Genres: Glitch, electronic rock, EDM, dubstep
- Length: 66:20
- Label: Glass Air Records
- Producers: edIT, Boreta, Ooah

The Glitch Mob chronology
Drink the Sea (2010)	Drink The Sea - The Remixes (2011)	Love Death Immortality (2013)

Professional ratings
Review scores
Source	Rating
Discogs	4.17 stars on a 5 point scale

Drink the Sea - The Remixes is a 2-volume release featuring remixes of tracks from the 2010 Drink the Sea album by the American electronic music trio The Glitch Mob. It was first released via the band's Glass Air Records imprint on January 13, 2011, to raise money and awareness for Download to Donate for Haiti V2.0, a Music For Relief charity project.

== Volume 1 Track Listing ==
No.	Title	Length
1.	"Between Two Points (Jogger Remix)" (featuring Swan)	4:06
2.	"Animus Vox (EPROM Remix)"	4:18
3.	"Bad Wings (Kastle Remix)"	4:39
4.	"Fistful Of Silence (ESKMO Remix)"	5:08
5.	"Between Two Points (St. Andrew Remix)"	6:42
6.	"How To Be Eaten By A Woman (Salva Remix)"	6:29
7.	"Drive It Like You Stole It (Mindelixir Remix)"	6:00
8.	"Starve The Ego, Feed The Soul (R/D Remix)" (featuring Swan)	6:17
9.	"Between Two Points (King Britt Remix)" (featuring Swan)	6:25
10.	"A Dream Within A Dream (Skeet Skeet Remix)"	4:15
11.	"We Swarm (Chris De Luca Remix)"	7:41
12.	"Drive It Like You Stole It (Pawn Remix)"	4:20

== Volume 2 Track Listing ==
No.	Title	Length
1.	"Fortune Days (DJ Vadim Remix)"	3:58
2.	"How To Be Eaten By A Woman (Camo UFOs Remix)"	5:01
3.	"Bad Wings (Deru Remix)"	4:21
4.	"Between Two Points (Comma Remix)"	5:54
5.	"Fortune Days (Virtual Boy Remix)"	4:56
6.	"Drive It Like You Stole It (Mirko Kosmos Remix)"	4:07
7.	"Between Two Points (SPL Remix)" (featuring Swan)	6:39
8.	"How To Be Eaten By A Woman (Mr. Projectile Remix)"	3:47
9.	"We Swarm (Beats Antique Remix)"	5:56
10.	"Between Two Dreams (Machinedrum Convergence)"	5:58
11.	"Bad Wings (Them Jeans Remix)"	4:48
12.	"How To Be Eaten By A Woman (Adam.01 Remix)"	5:58
13.	"A Dream Within A Dream (Nalepa Remix)"	5:41
