= The Indigo Belly Dance Company =

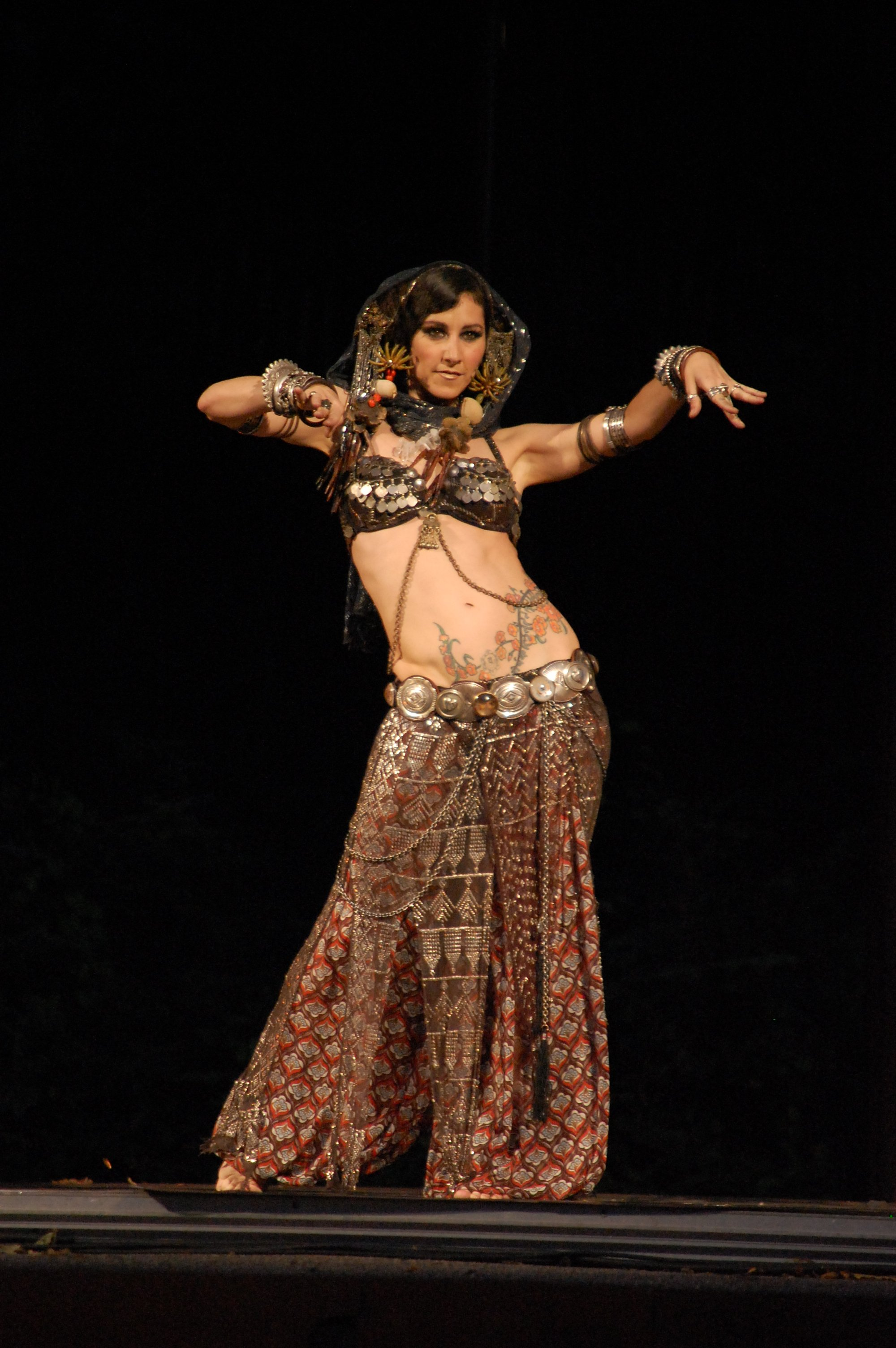
Rachel Brice, founder of The Indigo Belly Dance Company

The Indigo Belly Dance Company is a tribal fusion style belly dance company that was based in San Francisco. It was founded by Rachel Brice in 2003. Its members include Brice, Mardi Love, and Zoe Jakes. Past members include Sharon Kihara, Ariellah Aflalo, Janice Solimeno, and Michelle Campbell. Many of these dancers currently teach and perform internationally, and have also appeared with Bellydance Superstars.

2007 marked The Indigo's first full-length, vaudeville inspired, touring show, Le Serpent Rouge, presented by Miles Copeland III, which toured for two years.

The Indigo officially disbanded in 2013 so the individual members could pursue solo careers, but they still work together for occasional projects. Rachel Brice went on to open a school, Datura, in Portland, Oregon. Zoe Jakes routed all her creative energy into Beats Antique, and Mardi Love moved to the South and makes high-end jewelry.

== Performances and other works ==
=== Performances ===
- "Live in Paris: Folies Bergere"
- "Solos in Monte Carlo"
- "Bellydance Superstars"

=== Instructional ===
- "Tribal Fusion Belly Dance: Yoga, Isolations and Drills a Practice Companion with Rachel Brice"
- "Rachel Brice: Belly Dance Arms and Posture"
- "Serpentine: Belly Dance with Rachel Brice"

=== Musical collaborations ===
- "Sa'iyr - A Tribal Metamorphosis" (2005) - Pentaphobe (also known as "A Tribal Metamorphosis")
- "Bellydance Superstars volume 1" - Musical Selection
- "Bellydance Superstars volume 2" - Musical Selection
- "Bellydance Superstars volume 3" - Musical Selection
- "Le Serpent Rouge: Musical Selections from the Knockdown Revue" - Compilation
