= World Dance New York =

US entertainment company

- World Dance New York
- Industry: home video
- Founded: 2001 as Stratostream - World Dance New York in New York City, United States
- Headquarters: New York City, United States
- Products: home video for women, all media
- Brands: World Dance New York, Alpha Spirit, Body Politics, Personality Cult
- Website: http://www.WorldDanceNewYork.com

World Dance New York is a US home entertainment company, releasing and distributing special interest titles on DVD, video on demand, streaming media, iPhone and iPad apps, and a brand of women's dance and fitness home video products. It was founded in 2001 as "Stratostream - World Dance New York". "Stratostream" designates the company in the business-to-business environment, the home video industry, while "World Dance New York" is the publicly-recognized brand and the name of the consumer-facing operation of the company.

== History ==
World Dance New York was founded by New York-based entertainment entrepreneur Neon (dancer) to respond to the demand for instruction and fitness programs based on women's solo dance forms. The rising popularity of fitness and self-help home video and interest in creative fitness (as opposed to traditional gym-style programs) among women called for a wider range of movement disciplines and dance forms adapted for home video use. The first video releases by World Dance New York focused on belly dance and offered beginner instruction and workout programs for mass-market distribution and in-depth training programs for dance professionals.

In the years following the creation of the company, it established lines of video instruction and workout products for women in a number of solo dance forms, including belly dance, stiletto dance, hip-hop dance, Brazilian samba, Flamenco, Bollywood dance, burlesque, exotic dance, go-go dancing, fire dance, hoop dance, capoeira, women's self-defense, and prenatal (maternity) fitness. It also started releasing instructional and workout products adapting partner dance styles such as salsa (dance) to solo practice and performance, and added titles featuring traditional fitness disciplines, such as strength and flexibility at-home workouts for women, as well as yoga, Pilates, and stretching programs.

Non-movement categories in the World Dance New York catalog include alternative modeling, styling, hair and makeup (fantasy, pin-up girl and vintage), and esoteric arts.

== Sample home video series by genre ==
=== Belly dance fitness ===
- The Bellydance Core Fitness Workout with Ayshe
- The Bellydance Rhythms Workout with Neon
- The Bellydance Shimmy Workout with Sarah Skinner
- Celebration - The Bellydance Workout with Sarah Skinner
- Cocktail - The Bellydance Workout with Tanna Valentine
- Hard Candy - The Bellydance Workout with Neon
- Liquid Gold - Bellydance Fluid Movement Workout with Neon
- Love Potion - The Bellydance Workout with Neon
- Luscious - The Bellydance Workout with Neon
- Piece of Cake - The Bellydance Workout with Neon
- Silk - The Bellydance Veil Workout with Tanna Valentine
- The Tribal Fusion Bellydance Workout with Irina Akulenko
- "Instant Bellydancer" with Neon

=== Stiletto Dance ===
- Stiletto Dance: Music Video Style with Dana Foglia
- Thrills in High Heels - Stiletto Dance: Nightclub Style with Lady Morrighan
- Stiletto Dance: Sensual Style with Neon

=== Brazilian samba instruction and fitness ===
- The Brazilian Carnival Workout with Qiuenia Ribeiro
- The Cardio Samba Workout with Qiuenia Ribeiro
- Dance Today! Samba with Qiuenia Ribeiro
- The Samba Reggae Workout with Qiuenia Ribeiro

=== Flamenco dance instruction ===
- Dance Today! Flamenco with Puela Lunaris
- Flamenco is Hot! (campanilleros) with Puela Lunaris
- Flamenco: You Can Do It! (sevillanas) with Puela Lunaris

=== Solo salsa dance instruction and fitness ===
- Salsa Dance Fitness Party with Yesenia Adame
- Salsa... Solo! with Yesenia Adame
- Sexy Salsa with Yesenia Adame

=== Burlesque dance instruction ===
- Best Assets! The Burlesque Booty Workout with Gal Friday & Peekaboo Pointe
- Burlesque Chair Dance: Technique & Choreography with Jo Weldon
- Honey & Spice: Sensual & Fierce Burlesque with Jo Weldon
- Refined Sugar - Burlesque Dance with Katalin Schäfer
- Rock Bottom: The Burlesque Booty Workout with Peekaboo Pointe, Gal Friday
- Silk & Feathers: Burlesque Fan Dance with Jo Weldon
- Stripper Housewife - Burlesque Routines & Recipes for Stage & Kitchen with Peekaboo Pointe
- Striptease for Burlesque, Exotic Dance & Every Day with Jo Weldon

=== Tribal fusion belly dance ===
- Android Goddess: Tribal Fusion Belly Dance, Robotic Movement with Fayzah
- Belly Dance Pop & Lock: Tribal Fusion Bellydance / Hip-Hop with Elisheva
- Contemporary Bellydance & Yoga with Ariellah Aflalo
- East Coast Tribal Bellydance with Sera Solstice
- Fluid Tribal Belly Dance: Swirling Waves, Isolations, Hits & Breaks with Fayzah
- Foundations of Belly Dance: East Coast Tribal with Sera Solstice
- Lunar Bellydance: East Coast Tribal with Sera Solstice
- Modern Tribal Bellydance with Asharah
- Serpentine: Belly Dance with Rachel Brice
- Solar Bellydance: East Coast Tribal with Sera Solstice
- Tribaret Bellydance: Technique & Combinations with Carrie Konyha
- Fluid Precision - Contemporary Tribal Bellydance with Kassar

=== Fantasy and Gothic belly dance ===
- Fantasy Bellydance
- Fantasy Bellydance: Desire
- Fantasy Bellydance: Magic
- Fantasy Bellydance: Mystery
- Gothic Bellydance
- Gothic Bellydance - Revelations

=== Hip-hop and hip-hop/belly dance fusion ===
- Belly Dance - Hip-Hop: Liquid Fusion with Anasma
- Street Fusion! Street Jazz & Hip Hop Dance with Karen Gayle
- Urban Jam! Hip Hop Dance, 3 Routines: beginner-to-advanced with Laya Barak
- Wave Explosion! Belly Dance - Hip-Hop Liquid Fusion with Anasma
- Waves of the Future: Hip-Hop & House Dance with Future

== See also ==
- home video
- Neon (dancer)
