= Gothic belly dance =

Modern variant of belly dance

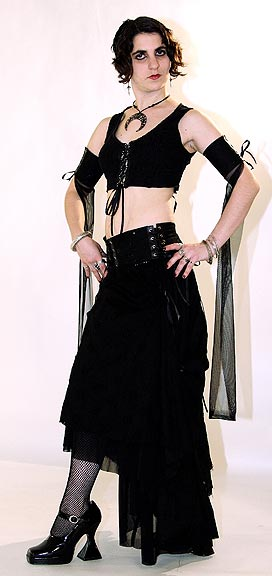
Tempest, Gothic belly dance performer/instructor, USA

Gothic belly dance, also named and separated in substyles as Gothic fusion belly dance, dark fusion belly dance and Gothic tribal fusion, is a recently founded dance art movement, distilled from the influences of Middle Eastern dance, tribal fusion, goth subculture and neopaganism. Originating in the United States in the 1990s, it has spread to be practiced by amateur and professional dancers around the world, and it is growing with the spread of tribal belly dance formats.

== History ==
Originating in the Middle East, South Asia (India), and North Africa, the art of belly dance arrived in the West with the trend of Orientalism. Exotic to the Western eye and mysterious in its roots, belly dance has always attracted interpretive dance artists who have woven it into trends of Western culture. As a modern and versatile world dance genre, belly dance has evolved into an array of interpretive dance sub-styles compatible with modern music and imagery. The new millennium brought a revival of popular interest in goth subculture and gothic art motifs in dance, and a new interpretive style, Gothic belly dance, was propelled to prominence.

Dance publications started exploring this new phenomenon, thousands of Gothic belly dance enthusiasts have subscribed to online discussion groups dedicated to this genre, leading artists started traveling across the US and overseas with workshops and tours, DVDs featuring Gothic belly dance performances, and instructional materials have appeared on retail shelves.

The cover of Gothic Bellydance DVD, 2006, World Dance New York, featuring Tempest and Ariellah Aflalo

The cover of Gothic Bellydance - Revelations DVD, 2007, World Dance New York, featuring Blanca and Jeniviva

Gothic belly dance was born in the US urban centers as a blend of Goth and world music, the movement vocabulary of belly dance and other dance forms, and Gothic fashion and aesthetics. Performing at Gothic-themed events and Goth clubs, dancers started to explore Goth music and adopt costuming styles incorporating Victorian, vampire, dark cabaret, silent-movie vamp, industrial, and other visual themes related to Goth subculture.

Gothic belly dance is not just a US phenomenon. Its popularity has been growing in the UK and Germany where belly dance artists have been dancing darkly since the early 1990s. Early Goth dancers did not have a label for what they did, but thanks to the Gothla dance festivals, Gothic belly dance came to be recognised in Europe.

Dancers performing Gothic belly dance usually retain their preferred technique — mostly modern cabaret and tribal fusion belly dance — but also bring new emphasis to the dramatic and theatrical features of their dance to match the intensity and vibe of Goth music.

== The 21st century ==
Gothic belly dance discussion groups hosted by tribe.net, MySpace, and other online community sites connected dancers from around the world, making possible workshops and tours, and helping this new genre to solidify and gain recognition within the larger dance community. In addition, the rapidly expanding global access to free online video resources at YouTube and similar sites has allowed artists to unify and combine their efforts in promoting and developing their genre — unconstrained by national borders, scarcity of funds, or lack of support from their local communities.

In 2007 Southern California-based dancers and instructors, Tempest and Sashi, launched the annual Gothla, described by the L.A. Weekly as "a "Gothic hafla" that combined weekend-long workshops with a Saturday festival featuring 12 hours of performances and merchant booths where dancers could find costumes and accessories."

Gothla UK was also first held in 2007, in Leicester, England, and is now a highly successful festival covering three days, usually in July. International teachers are joined by UK teachers such as Lucretia (Christine Emery), Fulya (Lynn Chapman), and Akasha (Heike Humphreys) to offer a range of themes not often covered by general belly dance events from Steampunk and 1920s to zombie and vampire belly dance.

== Notable performers and troupes ==
- Neon (dancer)
- Tempest (USA)
- Ariellah (USA)
- Sashi (USA)
- Ma'isah (Australia)
- Dani Cooper (Australia)
- Kalikah Jade (Australia)
- Jeniviva (USA)

== See also ==
- American Tribal Style Belly Dance
- Improv Tribal Style Belly Dance
- Tribal Fusion (dance form)
- Goth subculture
