= Tribal Style =

Tribal Style may refer to:

- American Tribal Style Belly Dance
- Improv Tribal Style Belly Dance
- Tribal Fusion
