= American Bellydancer =

2005 film

- Directed by: Jonathan Brandeis
- Produced by: Miles Axe Copeland
- Cinematography: Jonathan Brandeis
- Edited by: Jonathan Brandeis
- Distributed by: The Copeland Group
- Release date: March 12, 2005 (Tiburon International Film Festival)
- Country: United States
- Language: English

American Bellydancer is a 2005 documentary film directed by Jonathan Brandeis. It features Bellydancers including Ansuya, Rachel Galoob-Ortega, Suhaila Salimpour, Rachel Brice and Sonia.
