= Dance improvisation =

Spontaneous creation of movement

Dance improvisation is the process of spontaneously creating movement. Development of movement material is facilitated through a variety of creative explorations including body mapping through levels, shape and dynamics schema.

Improvisation is a free, seemingly unstructured, less technically strict and impulsive form that draws inspiration from everyday dance practices and influences. It is a movement technique that is capable of evoking dramatic and thought-provoking content just as well as more codified western dance techniques such as ballet and non-western movement forms.

Dance improvisation is not only about creating new movement but is also defined as freeing the body from habitual movement patterns (see Postmodern dance and Judson Dance Theater). Dancer and singer Michael Jackson combined improvisation in both of those definitions, insisting that he had an interest in performing a dance to Billie Jean only if he could do it a new way each time.

A lot of improvisation is focused on finding a deeper way of comprehending otherwise concealed thoughts or feelings of an individual. Through the emphasis of instinctual, unpredictable, free movement that improvisation is centred upon the mover is able to explore authentic feelings and inspirations.

== The history of improvisation in dance ==
=== Western theatrical dance ===
In Renaissance Italy, improvisation was used and valued in performance and participatory dances. In performance-based settings in the 15th century, dancers used improvisation to alter or replace various steps or motions, particularly hand gestures, in choreography for the purpose of creating variety. This use of improvisation declined in the 16th century, as set, specific choreography came to be favored over more individual, improvised motions. Improvisation was still used in some sense to enhance choreography during this time; however, this improvisation also became much more regulated and structured. For the following several centuries in the west, improvisation became used primarily as a method of creating choreography and remedying mistakes and mishaps during a performance.

During the period of Romantic and classical ballet, improvisation was used very scarcely, however there remained a place for it in ballet performance. Primarily, improvisation was used in ballet at this time by certain exceptional principal dancers such as Marie Taglioni, Anna Pavlova, and Fanny Elssler who used improvisation to embellish their leading roles in ballets.

It was not until the end of the 19th century, however, that dance improvisation in western dance became such a large part of performance and dance technique. Towards the end of the 19th and throughout the 20th century, with the beginning of what has become known as modern dance, dance improvisation flourished both as a choreographic tool as well as a method performance. In the late 19th century, Loïe Fuller exemplified an explicit improvisational performance method with her use of task-based and idiosyncratic movement that both allowed for and necessitated improvisation on the part of the dancer. Slightly later in the early 20th century, movement choruses, especially those under the direction of Mary Wigman and Rudolf Laban used improvisational techniques intensely in training, and to varying degrees in performance in accordance with the director's preference and opinion on the subject. In the second half of the 20th century, improvisation in dance exploded once more and was explored even more deeply by creators including but not limited to Isadora Duncan, Martha Graham, Doris Humphrey, Merce Cunningham, and Paul Taylor. Each of these individuals developed their own methodology and technique behind modern dance and employed improvisation in numerous different ways that were key to the choreography and execution of their techniques. Although Isadora Duncan is often cited as having improvised her performances, this may be based more on the free, natural quality of her movement rather than fact. While some of her material was definitely set, it is likely that other parts were in fact improvised.

Contact and group improvisation also evolved in this time with Yvonne Rainer’s formation of the Grand Union in 1970. The Grand Union was an improvisational dance group that performed improvisation that was not prepared or rehearsed beforehand.

Furthermore, and in part thanks to theories on human development that were developed in the 19th century, improvisation started being used in dance therapy and dance education in the 20th century as well. Improvisation became a key part in the educational methods of many dance educators including Bird Larson and Margaret H’Doubler who emphasized self-expression through dance improvisation.

Many other important tenets of dance improvisation come from and were innovated by the African American community. From jazz to blues to hip hop to tap, so many major forms of improvisational dance were created in the African American community, making clear the incredible impact Black artists had and continue to have on dance improvisation as well as dance at large.

== Developed dance forms with improvisational life ==
=== Argentine tango ===
Argentine tango is a dance form that despite the apparent choreography relies on improvisation. Improvisation techniques are taught and improvisation is encouraged as necessary to reach high levels of competency in dance and performance environments. Closely knit crowds, varying rhythmic patterns in music, switching partners for each dance, and a large vocabulary of movements encourage improvisational dance in Argentine tango.

=== Belly dance ===
Belly dance is one of the most commonly improvised dance forms, since often live music does not support the structured nature of choreography. Professional belly dancers may dance publicly 6 nights a week, up to three times a night, and simply do not have the time to choreograph for the 15–60 minutes a night that such performing requires. Even dancers with substantial choreography repertoires often choose to improvise when performing to live music because they value the exchange of energy between the dancer, the musicians, and the audience, which is heightened by working "in the moment". American Tribal Style belly dance and Improvisational Tribal Style are built entirely upon group improvisation, although the group will typically plan and rehearse individual combinations and their cues in advance.

=== Blues ===
Blues dance is generally done to blues music, and is highly improvisational. Like lindy hop, emphasis is on the lead and follow connection, but the emphasis is even greater. Blues dance is a partnered and structured form of interpretive dance, and relies mostly on the leader interpreting the music how he or she will; at the same time, the follower usually has some freedom to interpret the music and add in their own style as well.

=== Break dance ===
B-boying features a heavily improvisational style based on cyclic movement patterns. Many styles of b-boying exist, and dance crews will often choreograph performances for specific songs. Individual performances are more commonly improvised due to the nature of the dance.

=== Lindy Hop ===
Lindy Hop is generally an eight-count swing dance, developed in large part by Frankie Manning, and includes a large amount of improvisation. Once a dancer has learned a variety of swing dance moves, ranging from West Coast Swing to Charleston to Balboa, the dancer will often combine any and all the moves they know of these styles of dance, as well as add their own dance style, or make up new dance moves or aerials. Because of its improvisational nature, lindy hop heavily relies on lead and follow connection, rather than each partner knowing the steps and doing them together.

=== Post-modern dance and contact improvisation ===
In the 1970s, Judson Church dancer and choreographer Steve Paxton, in collaboration with other post-modern dancers, developed Contact Improvisation. "Contact improv" is an un-codified, somatic technique that serves as a framework for collective improvisation. It involves multiple dancers who explore movement together by supporting each other's weight, maintaining contact with each other, and bringing their attention to the point or points of contact between them. Unlike the pas de deux of classical ballet, in which the male partner lifts and supports the female, contact improvisation does not assign differential roles to each dancer. There are no officially codified or standardized movements, but partners commonly lift, carry, fall onto or off of, caress, and lean on each other.

Contact improvisation is sometimes used by post-modern choreographers to generate or develop choreography.

== See also ==
- Choreography (dance)
- Ecstatic dance
- List of dance style categories
- Parkour
