= Amar Gamal =

Cuban belly dance performer and instructor

Amar Gamal (born Teresa Infante c. 1975) is a Cuban bellydancer who grew up in Florida.

== Early life and education ==
Gamal, born Teresa Infante, grew up in Miami where she learned to bellydance at the age of thirteen. At thirteen, she began performing with the Mid-Eastern Dance Exchange company, based in Miami Beach. One of her directors at the time was the well-known dancer, Tamalyn Dallal, who had inspired her when she was younger.

Gamal went on to become the first dancer to audition with bellydancing techniques and be accepted at the New World School of the Arts' Performing Arts School. While a senior at the New World School of Arts, Gamal also taught dancing to young children. She trained in other types of dancing, such as ballet, jazz, tap, flamenco and modern, while at that school.

Gamal graduated with a degree in psychology at Bridgewater State College in Massachusetts.

== Career ==
After graduation Gamal performed during the NFL's Super Bowl XXIX in 1995, and participated in the Miss World of Bellydancing contest of 1996, before dancing for five different dance companies.

In 1997, she performed at the Gianni Versace fashion show. In 1998, she participated at the Oriental Dance Production, in Lexington, Kentucky. During the late 1990s she has performed in Trinidad and Tobago, Haiti and Costa Rica.

In 2002 Gamal earned first place in the Mondo Melodia Bellydance Breakbeats competition and was chosen to participate in the release tour of a CD — Bellydance Superstars — released on November 12.

Gamal was a member of the Bellydance Superstars, a professional dance company that was founded in 2003 and toured the United States in 2004. She founded the group BellyQueen with another dancer named Kaeshi Chai, and Jenna Rosenberg was also a member of the group.

Gamar has taught belly dancing in Los Angeles and San Francisco, California, in New York City and in Buenos Aires, Argentina.

She appeared as herself in the 2005 documentary, "American Bellydancer". In 2002, she had appeared in a concert DVD, "Bellydance Superstars". On 11 March 2008, Gamal released a video titled "Mastering the Dance: Amar Gamal".
