= Crying Over Pros for No Reason =

Studio album by edIT
- Released: April 12, 2004
- Genre: Electronic; hip-hop; glitch-hop; intelligent dance music
- Length: 38:58; 58:24 (deluxe edition)
- Label: x: Planet Mu; Glass Air
- Producer: edIT

EdIT chronology
Crying Over Pros for No Reason (2004)	Certified Air Raid Material (2007)

Crying Over Pros for No Reason is the debut studio album by American electronic music producer Edward Ma under the alias of edIT. It was released on April 12, 2004, through Planet Mu.

== Background ==
Ma had been a producer for acts such as Sole and Busdriver under the alias Conartist. (Note: Sources vary on how the name is written; Reeves uses "Conartist", while Fintoni uses "the Con Artist".) He was influenced by his roommate at the time, who had bought and played records from electronic artists such as Squarepusher, Boards of Canada and Aphex Twin, and who had introduced him to Planet Mu through other records that he had bought. Demos of the album were sent to various labels, including to Planet Mu, which Ma chose to release it with.

Ma made the album in the digital audio workstation Pro Tools, with all of its production done by hand without access to VST plugins. The title of the album, Crying Over Pros for No Reason, plays off of the word "hoes"—in an interview with UKF Music, Ma stated, "Back in those days the radio wouldn’t let you say hoes. So artists changed it to pros. It was a cool little riff on it – crying over girls for no reason."

== Reception ==
Professional ratings
Retrospective reviews
Review scores
Source	Rating
Sputnikmusic	4.5/5

Upon release, Crying Over Pros for No Reason received little to no attention other than from specialized magazines and blogs. Retrospective reviews of the album have been positive; Laurent Fintoni, in a feature for Fact, called the album "groundbreaking, and important", noting how the album was ahead of its time and praising it for its accessibility through its roots in hip-hop and describing it as "a blueprint for things to come". Rob Theakston of AllMusic acknowledged the album's similarities to artists such as Prefuse 73 and Telefon Tel Aviv, but called it "a strong debut". Former Sputnikmusic staff reviewer StrangerofSorts gave the album a 4.5 out of 5, comparing its production to that of DJ Shadow's and calling it "incredibly soulful".

A deluxe edition of Crying Over Pros for No Reason was released through The Glitch Mob's Glass Air Records imprint in December 2014. Talking about the possibility of a follow-up album, Ma stated, "I always felt that if I couldn't top it, or couldn't say anything more about it, then I wouldn't say anything...The amount of people who've hit me up about it over the years made me realise how cult the record was and how special it was to some people. If I couldn't hit a home run harder than that, then I wouldn't do it."

== Track listing ==
Crying Over Pros for No Reason track listing
No.	Title	Length
1.	"Ashtray"	4:16
2.	"Ants"	4:03
3.	"Laundry"	5:46
4.	"Situps Pullups"	5:16
5.	"Dex"	4:28
6.	"Twenty Minutes"	4:43
7.	"Screening Phone Calls"	2:48
8.	"Mop Head"	3:23
9.	"Ltlp"	3:16
10.	"Mildew"	1:04
Total length:		38:58

Crying Over Pros for No Reason (Deluxe Edition) track listing
No.	Title	Length
11.	"Spare Spork"	4:58
12.	"Ceilings"	5:06
13.	"Arbor"	4:31
14.	"Crashes"	3:15
15.	"Sometimes in September"	1:31
Total length:		58:24
