= Karim Nagi =

- Origin: Cairo, Egypt
- Occupation: Musician
- Instruments: Tabla, Riqq, Sagat (finger cymbals)
- Website: www.karimnagi.com

Karim Nagi is an Egyptian musician, composer, ethnic dance artist, and DJ. He specializes in traditional Arabic music but is widely known for his innovative approach. In total he has released fourteen CDs and six DVDs, and he tours internationally performing and teaching.

Karim Nagi has been an invited speaker and master class instructor at Brown University, Princeton University, Yale University, the University of Chicago, New York University, Boston University, and the University of California Los Angeles, among many others, including international institutions. He has been a featured ethnic dance artist at Jacob's Pillow Dance Festival and a featured music artist at the American Folk Festival in Bangor, Maine, in 2004 and Lowell, Mass., in 2005.

In 2001 Karim Nagi started the program Arabiqa, aimed to educate children and adults alike on Arabic culture through music and arts rather than through religion and politics. He is a member of the New England Foundation for the Arts, through which he is a New England States Touring (NEST) artist.

Under the name Turbo Tabla, Karim Nagi has released four albums, two of which were distributed internationally by Universal Records. These albums feature Karim's pioneering technique and unique aesthetic in mixing traditional Arabic sounds with hip hop, techno, and house. More recently, he has been exploring English language spoken word fused with his signature Arab percussion and electronic remixes.

He produces the annual Arab Dance Seminar, now in its fourteenth session, where he invites native and expert instructors to teach dances and culture from around the Arab world over three days every November. He is also the director of the Sharq Ensemble, a group of three to thirteen Arab and American musicians that revives and performs traditional Arabic music. The Ensemble was featured, to wide acclaim, in the Boston Christmas Revels in 2011 and has also performed, toured and released one CD with the Boston Camerata.

== Biography ==
Born in Kuwait, Karim Nagi lived in Egypt until his father received an offer to complete his residency in England. His family then moved to the United States, where his father worked as a radiologist.

Music did not become a central point in Karim's life until he met composer Christopher Stowens, who encouraged him to play percussion instruments and taught him the basics of computer-driven electronic music.

Karim studied philosophy and psychology at Skidmore College, where he was heavily involved in theatre sound production and played guitar and drums in multiple bands on the side.

After his graduation, Karim traveled around India, Turkey, Eastern Europe, and Egypt. At the end of his extended travels in 1995, Karim dedicated himself to the study and performance of Arabic music. He studied with Nabil Ata and Midhat al-Rashidi (who performed regularly with Abdel Halim Hafez), Simon Shaheen, Michel Baqlouq (Fairuz ensemble), Dr. Alfred Gamil (Cairo Conservatory of Music) and Mohammed Al-Araby (percussionist for Umm Kulthum and The National Orchestra of Egypt). He focused on Arabic percussion, including the Arabic Tabla (goblet drum), the Riq, and the Sagat (finger cymbals).

During the 1990s, Karim was well known in Boston for his family's boutique on Newbury Street, his participation in fashion shows, and his skills as a DJ. However, after 9/11, Karim decided to educate people about his culture instead of hiding his identity. His Arabesque Mondays at Club Passim captured Boston's attention. These monthly gatherings aimed to "draw together people interested in traditional [Arabic] music... and educate those who may not be familiar with it." He attracted Boston's attention and revived the Arab music scene in Boston

Karim's educative mission then moved from the club scene to the classroom. He taught Arabic music at The New England Conservatory of Music for five years, and has since been invited to lecture and present at schools, colleges, universities, conservatories, museums, and events (such as SXSW) across the United States and internationally. In the course of his work, including frequent invitations to teach workshops for dance and music studios, he has traveled to and taught on every continent (except Antarctica), in more than 20 countries.

=== Tradition re-imagined ===
Karim Nagi has recorded four albums under the moniker of Turbo Tabla: Arabic Music Re-Imagined (2003), Bellydance Overdrive (2004), The Belly and the Beat (2006), and Unregulated (2010). Two were released by The Miles Copeland Group (Sting, R.E.M., Hakim, Bellydance Superstars, Oojami) and are distributed internationally by Universal Records. All include tracks originally composed or arranged by Nagi. They exemplify Karim's principle "tradition re-imagined" - fusing traditional songs, rhythms and sounds from the Arab world with hip-hop, techno and house music.

In 2012 Karim Nagi released two albums under "Karim Nagi," which further developed his philosophy of innovation within tradition. In the first, "Arabized," Karim tackles the concept of Westernization. He reworks recognizable songs from non-Arabic traditions (including American, Chinese, Mexican, Indian, and European), using Arabic instruments and rhythm, i.e. "Arabizing" them. He also makes his first extended foray into vocals on the original track "The Mash of Civilizations," in which he samples several recognizable non-Arab tunes and themes, combines them with Arabic instruments and overlays his spoken word message about cultural collaboration.

"Rhythmatiq," the second album from 2012, showcases Karim's expertise in Arab rhythms. Utilizing samples, tabla, riq, sagat, hand-clapping, and even voice (at times reminiscent of bol (music)), he builds short songs entirely upon a single Arab rhythm or rhythmatic concept. The tracks incorporate cultural context audible to the trained ear and are meant to be mixed and matched, enabling listeners and performers to create their own drum solos. The album opens and closes with two of Karim Nagi's complete drum solos, featuring his signature energetic yet clean tabla technique and demonstrating his structured philosophy to drum solos. Furthermore, the CD packaging includes a chart of all the included rhythms and more, making the album a teaching tool as well. After the release of the album, Karim invited dancers from around the world (all students of his) to choreograph individual pieces.

As a result of his innovative fusion of the traditional and modern, Karim Nagi's music appeals to and is utilized by a wide range of dance artists, from tribal fusion artists like Jill Parker to more traditional Raqs Sharqi artists, like Bozenka. In 2008 he was nominated for the Zaghareet Awards (for those involved in Middle Eastern dance and music in the United States) in the Category of Favorite Musician.

=== Multi-dimensional performer ===
Nagi integrates dance and DJ into his musical performances. His signature Turbo Tabla performances involve energetic dancing while playing the tabla, untraditionally strapped over his shoulder. His technique for the tabla strap developed in the context of teaching Dabka and is a well-kept secret.

He is also well known for his ambidextrous approach to playing the Sagat and ability to accompany his own dancing with his musical skill on the instrument.

In addition, he will sometimes break the group tradition of Dabka by performing lively solos.

=== Musician ===
While a pioneer in modernizing Arab music, Karim Nagi is also a purist: "Old-Style tradition Arabic music still crushes my soul. It is my first love. It is the only style of music that consistently blisses me."

Although adept at multiple instruments, Karim Nagi's specialty is the Riq. He is sought after for his musicality and intuitive accompaniment skill on the riq, regularly being invited to perform with DC-based band Ana Masry and for the Jawaahir Dance Company in Minneapolis

He is also the founder and director of the Sharq Ensemble. Their mission: To preserve and present traditional and classical Arabic vocal and instrumental music. The ensemble has performed at Harvard University, MIT, UC Santa Barbara, The Boston Center for the Arts, Brooklyn Museum of Art, among many others.

In 2005, The Sharq Ensemble joined the Boston Camerata on the project A Mediterranean Christmas. They released an album and toured France and Germany. The repertoire is based on medieval musical cultures of southern Europe and northern Africa, between 1200-1900.

The Sharq Ensemble formed an integral part of the Boston Christmas Revels in 2011, where they sold out their 2005 album REVIVAL: Wasla Hijazkar and Wasla Bayyati (still available electronically).

Given his expertise in Arab rhythms, Karim Nagi has also released albums aimed at educating listeners about the traditional rhythms found in the Arab world. These CDs include Rhythms from Around the Arab World and Advanced Rhythms for the Advanced Dancer. He has also released instructional DVDs for both tabla and riq.

=== Dancer ===
Although primarily known as a musician, Karim Nagi has also trained in traditional Arab folk dances, specifically Dabka and Saidi Raqs al assaya (martial arts-based staff dance from Upper Egypt). He can frequently be seen performing the latter, dressed traditionally in a Galabeya and utilizing a pair of staves. He is widely sought after by dancers to teach Arab folk dances, as well as topics that integrate his knowledge of music and dance, e.g. Musicality for Dancers, Live Drum Solo, Arabic Maqam and Taqsim, and Survey of Arabic Music for Dance.

Deeply invested in placing Arab dance in its cultural context, Karim began producing the Arab Dance Seminar in 2005. This three-day event immerses students in the language, music, social and political context of dances from different parts of the Arab world. The classes are taught by Karim Nagi and teachers whom he personally selects, including native Arabs and non-Arab ethnologists. The Arab Dance Seminar has sold out every year since its inception.

He has also produced an instructional DVD on Arab Folk Dance, which includes lessons in Dabka, Saidi Raqs al assaya (based on Tahtib), Khaleeji, and Sufi ritual dance.

=== Outreach to non-Arabs ===
After 9/11 Karim Nagi became acutely aware of the need for cultural education that humanized and depoliticized Arabs and Arab culture. He created Arabiqa, a program he presents in schools around the country in order to bring Arabic music and arts closer to children. He has also presented his Arabiqa program for adults at conferences in Colleges, Universities, Conservatories, and Music events. In 2013 he produced a full-length theatre program based on Arabiqa, which he performed at the YMCA Theatre in Cambridge, MA.

Karim Nagi explains the mission of Arabiqa: "Language and the arts define Arab and Islamic culture. By learning about these unifying themes, one can understand this culture with much more depth and authenticity...My agenda is to demonstrate the depth of Arab art as exemplified in music and dance... Arab culture, through the universal language of music, becomes demystified and humanized. The beauty and authenticity of Arabic music and dance serve as a convincing demonstration of the simultaneous exoticism and familiarity of this ancient culture".

=== Outreach to the Arab diaspora ===
With Club Passim in Cambridge, Karim Nagi began the work of connecting the Arab-American diaspora to each other as well as to their traditional culture. As a self-employed professional artist, he encourages Arabs to preserve and participate in the presentation of their traditions. In 2009 he was invited as a panelist at the Diwan conference at the Arab American National Museum in Dearborn, Michigan. His presentation, titled Lauren of Arabia addressed the prevalence of non-Arabs in Arab dance culture and encouraged members of the Arab diaspora to represent themselves in the arts.

== Other sources ==
- Brown, Joel (2011-12-19). "Traditional and terrific 'Revels' Fun". The Boston Globe. Archived from the original on December 17, 2024.
- Dyer, Richard (2004-12-18). "Camerata blends cultural traditions to capture holiday's spirit". The Boston Globe. Archived from the original on February 8, 2006.
- Young, Bob (2003-02-07). "Turbo Tabla mixes Mideast tradition with modern beat". Boston Herald. pp. S29. Archived from the original on May 25, 2011.
