= Rachel Brice =

American belly dancer

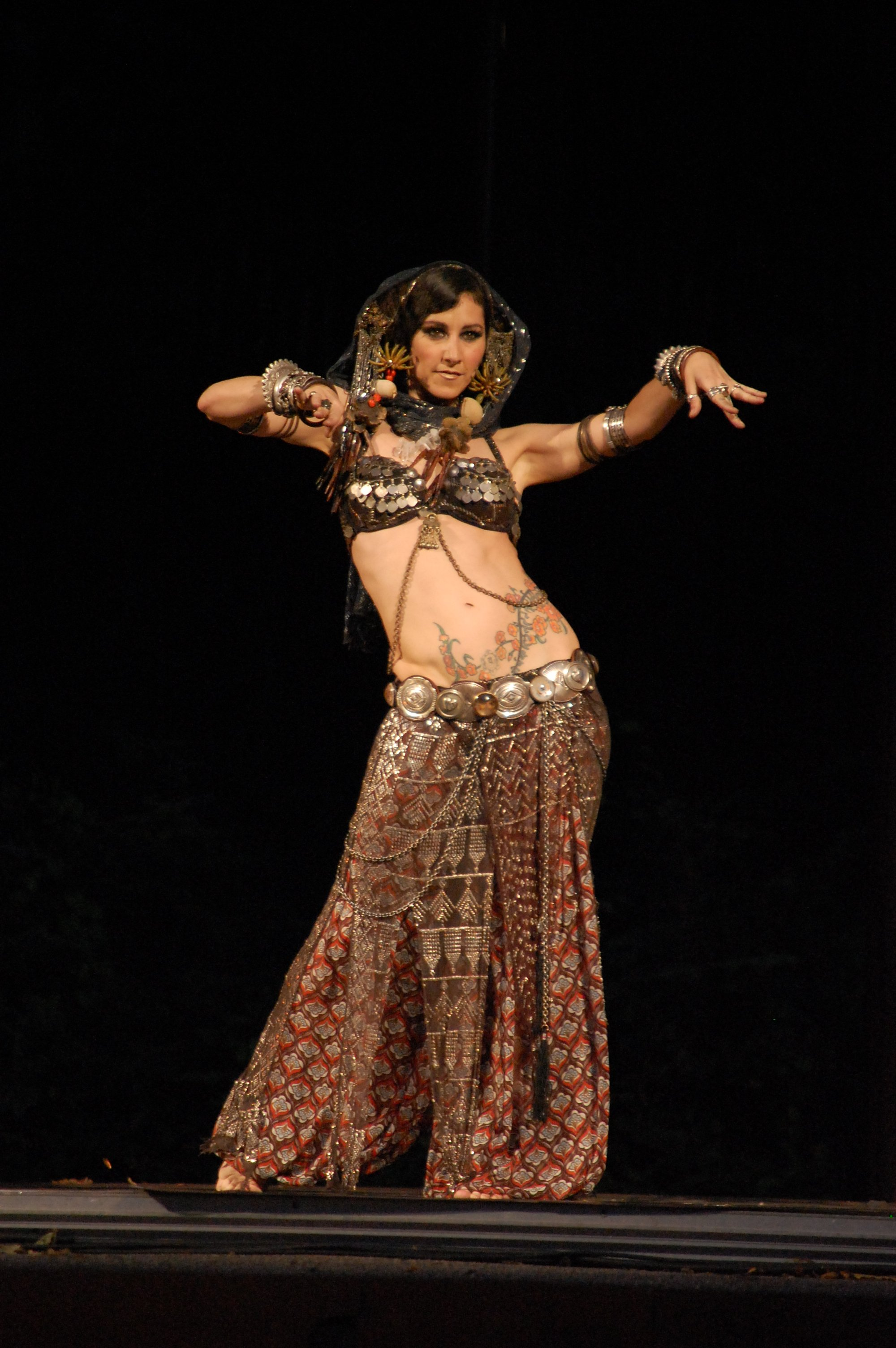
- Brice at the Tribal Umrah festival in Rennes, France, 2012

Background information
- Born: June 15, 1972 (age 54); Seattle, Washington, U.S.
- Occupation: Dancer
- Website: rachelbrice.com

Rachel Brice (born June 15, 1972) is an American professional dancer in tribal fusion-style belly dance. She was the artistic director and choreographer for the Indigo Belly Dance Company and a frequent performer with the Bellydance Superstars. In June 2011, she opened her own dance studio in Portland, Oregon called Studio Datura. There, she hosts regular dance classes along with workshops from her 8 Elements™ Approach to Belly Dance training program.

== Biography ==
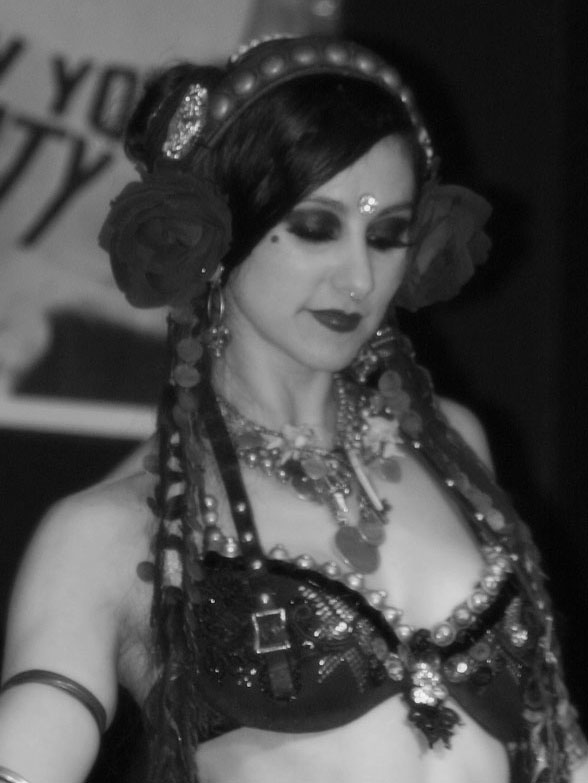
Brice in 2007

A graduate of San Francisco State University, Brice performed and toured since 2002. A member of the Bellydance Superstars, she appeared on Bellydance Superstars DVDs, as well as television and radio appearances worldwide, most notably Live with Regis and Kelly in the US and Blue Peter in England.

As a teacher and movement arts pedagogue, Brice has released instructional videos focusing on yoga and belly dance, and has given workshops throughout the United States, Europe, Asia, and Australia. Brice began teaching Yoga and Belly Dance for Pixar Animation Studios and continues to teach workshops annually all over the world. In 2012, Brice launched her online belly dance and conditioning studio, Datura Online.

== Personal account ==
From Brice's website:

"Rachel Brice fell in love with belly dance after she saw Hahbi'Ru in the early nineties. After she saw big, gorgeous, proud women with strong carriage and charisma adorned with spectacular antique tribal jewelry, facial tattoos, and rich textiles, it changed the way she saw beauty. She instantly started classes in American Cabaret.

In the early 2000s, she studied American Tribal Style® Belly Dance, African Haitian, Flamenco, Modern Dance, Kathak, and Odissi Classical. Simultaneously, she was in Jill Parker's Ultra Gypsy, the first Tribal Fusion troupe. She was influenced by the forms she studied so these influenced her style. She danced with Mardi Love, an aesthetic influence.

2001, she was hired by mogul Miles Copeland, then toured for five years with his company Bellydance Superstars. These tours promoted the San Francisco belly-dance known as Tribal Fusion.

Rachel studied belly dance with her teachers Carolena Nericcio, creator of American Tribal Style®, and yoga with Gary Kraftsow. She studies with her colleagues. She resides in Portland Oregon, and operates the studio Datura, and has a production company called Little Scarab, which she started with Sol Crawford. She teaches a four-phase belly-dance program called the 8 Elements™ Approach to Belly Dance..."

== Filmography ==
=== Performance ===
- "Bellydance Superstars Live in Paris: Folies Bergere"
- "Bellydance Superstars Solos in Monte Carlo"
- "Bellydance Superstars"

=== Instructional ===
- "Tribal Fusion: Yoga, Isolations and Drills a Practice Companion with Rachel Brice"
- "Rachel Brice: Belly Dance Arms and Posture"
- "Serpentine: Belly Dance with Rachel Brice" DVD / instant video produced by World Dance New York

== Musical collaborations ==
- "Sa'iyr – A Tribal Metamorphosis" (2005) – Pentaphobe (also known as "A Tribal Metamorphosis")
- "Bellydance Superstars volume 1" – Musical Selection
- "Bellydance Superstars volume 2" – Musical Selection
- "Bellydance Superstars volume 3" – Musical Selection
- "Le Serpent Rouge: Musical Selections from the Knockdown Revue" – Compilation

== See also ==
- List of dancers
