= Certified Air Raid Material =

Studio album by edIT
- Released: September 18, 2007
- Genre: Electronic, hip hop
- Length: 47:31
- Label: Alpha Pup Records
- Producer: edIT

EdIT chronology
Crying Over Pros for No Reason (2004)	Certified Air Raid Material (2007)

Singles from Certified Air Raid Material
- 1. "Battling Go-Go Yubari in Downtown L.A. / Crunk De Gaulle" Released: 2007

Certified Air Raid Material is the second studio album by American electronic music producer edIT, released on Alpha Pup Records on September 18, 2007. It features guest appearances from The Grouch, Abstract Rude, TTC, Busdriver, and D-Styles.

== Reception ==
Professional ratings
Review scores
Source	Rating
Cyclic Defrost	favorable
KEXP-FM	favorable
Tiny Mix Tapes	4/5 stars
XLR8R	8/10

Alan Ranta of Tiny Mix Tapes gave the album 4 stars out of 5 and described it as "[Edit's] unite-after-war album, using the unmistakable aggression of U.S. club hip-hop beats as a reflection of the world's continually spiraling political climate." Matt Earp of XLR8R gave the album an 8 out of 10, calling it "one of the best party albums of the year".

On November 5, 2007, the title track was listed by KEXP-FM as the "Song of the Day".

== Track listing ==
No.	Title	Length
1.	"Questions"	0:18
2.	"Battling Go-Go Yubari in Downtown L.A."	5:25
3.	"Artsy Remix" (featuring The Grouch)	5:03
4.	"Certified Air Raid Material"	6:06
5.	"Night Shift" (featuring Abstract Rude)	3:15
6.	"Straight Heat"	3:22
7.	"The Sirens"	4:41
8.	"Back Up Off the Floor Pt. 2" (featuring The Grouch)	3:39
9.	"Fire Riddim"	5:31
10.	"If You Crump Stand Up"	4:21
11.	"Crunk De Gaulle" (featuring TTC, Busdriver, and D-Styles)	5:00
12.	"Parting Shot"	0:25
