= Neon (dancer) =

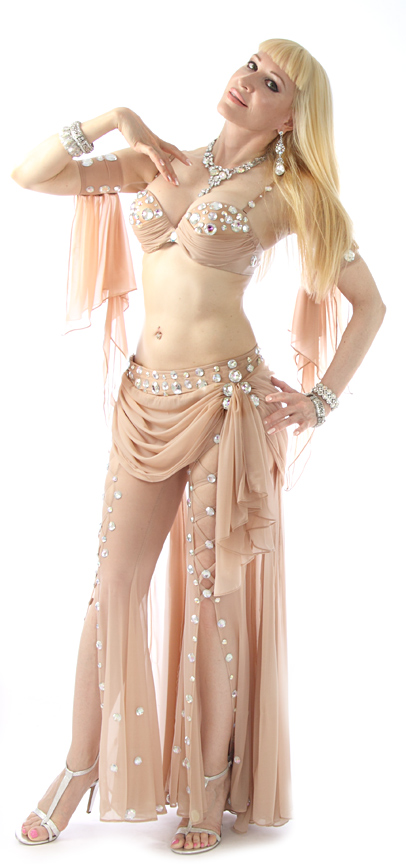
- Career
- Dances: belly dance, stiletto dance
- Website: http://www.Neonissima.com

Neon is a contemporary belly dance and stiletto dance performer, instructor, and choreographer based in New York City. She is also the founder and owner of Stratostream Entertainment - World Dance New York, a US entertainment company publishing dance instruction, performance, and fitness home video products for women. As a dance instructor Neon has developed innovative visualisation-based methods for teaching dance and dance fitness in an accelerated-learning format.

== Instruction ==
In the early 2000s, the rising popularity of women's solo dance styles as forms of creative fitness prompted the development of fast-track methods for teaching dance. Among the first dance fitness promoters, Neon based her courses on clear categorization of dance vocabulary, syntax and semantics, and borrowed from the language instruction techniques that stimulate intuitive discovery of patterns in a system of communication (such as in the Rosetta Stone and Berlitz instructional methods). Working with two- and three-dimensional trajectory visualizations and motor imagery she designed sequences of instructional cues and shortcuts that help learners with varying kinesthetic and space visualization abilities find correct movement trajectories without prolonged mechanical repetition. To promote the accelerated-learning dance class format, Neon introduced visualization-based learning tools in her dance instruction video programs, including 3-D graphic overlays on a dance instructor's moving image tracking directions and shapes of movement trajectories.

== Publishing work ==
Neon founded Stratostream Entertainment - World Dance New York in 2003 to produce video dance instruction and fitness products for women with a focus on women's solo dance forms. Currently World Dance New York publishes dance instruction, creative movement, and women's lifestyle special interest video products in many diverse genres including belly dance, hip-hop dance, salsa, samba, Bollywood dance, Flamenco, burlesque, exotic dance & striptease, fire dance, stiletto dance (music video style), go-go dancing, hoop dance, capoeira, women's self-defense, prenatal fitness, prenatal dance, modeling, pin-up girl/vintage makeup/hair/styling. The World Dance New York educational video products are distributed on DVDs, streaming media, video on demand, and iPhone/iPad apps via mainstream retail channels.

== Filmography ==
=== Dance instruction ===
- "Bellydance: First Steps"
- "Sensual Goddess: Bellydance for Beginners"
- "Body Language of Bellydance"
- "Stiletto Dance - Sensual Style"
- "Femme Fatale Bellydance Choreography by Neon"
- "Fire Goddess: Bellydance Candle Tray Choreography by Neon"
- "City of Dreams: Bellydance Choreography by Neon"
- "Don’t Make Me Blush: Bellydance Choreography by Neon"
- "Fantasy Bellydance: Mystery"
- "Instant Bellydancer"
- "Bellydance Party"
- "Dance Today! Bellydance"
- "You Can Bellydance!"
- "Queen of Flowers: Bellydance Tray Balancing"

=== Dance fitness ===
- "Luscious - The Bellydance Workout"
- "Love Potion - The Bellydance Workout"
- "Hard Candy - The Bellydance Workout"

- "Piece of Cake - The Bellydance Workout"
- "Liquid Gold: Bellydance Fluid Movement Workout"
- "The Bellydance Rhythms Workout"
- "Bellydance for Body Sculpting: Abs"
- "Bellydance for Body Sculpting: Buns & Thighs"

=== Dance performance ===
- "Fantasy Bellydance"
- "Tarot: Fantasy Bellydance"
- "Gothic Bellydance"
- "Gothic Bellydance - Revelations"
- "The Golden Apple: Bellydance Stars of New York"
- "Stellar Body: Bellydance with Fire"

== See also ==
- Raqs Sharqi
- Gothic belly dance
