= Jo Weldon =

American burlesque performer and author (b. 1962)

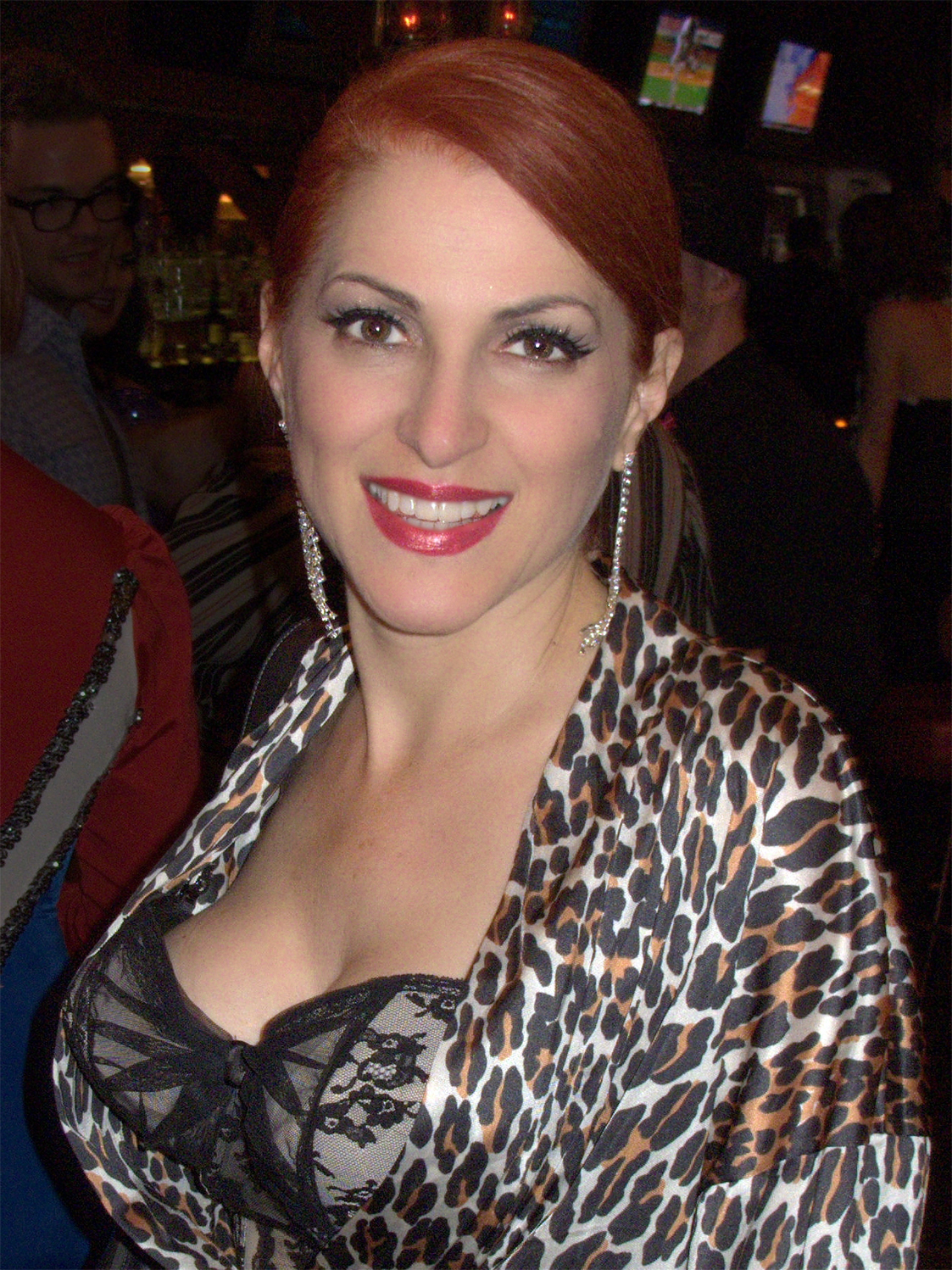
- Weldon in 2009
- Born: 1962 (age 63–64)
- Occupations: Burlesque performer, author, photographer,
- Children: 1
- Website: schoolofburlesque.com

Jo Weldon (born 1962), commonly known as Jo Boobs or Jo Boobs Weldon, is a performer, author, activist, and educator based in New York City. Weldon's body of work centers around stripping and striptease. She established and runs the New York School of Burlesque and wrote The Burlesque Handbook. She is an advocate for sex workers' rights and freedom of sexual expression.

== Early career ==
After moving to New York in 1997, Weldon took part in burlesque shows at The Blue Angel and Coney Island and was inspired by performances from Angie Pontani, Bambi the Mermaid and Remy Vicious. Weldon's academic career includes a degree in Business Administration, with her graduate work in media ethics. During her internships, she worked writing summaries of House of Representatives activities and writing scripts for CNN.

== Burlesque ==
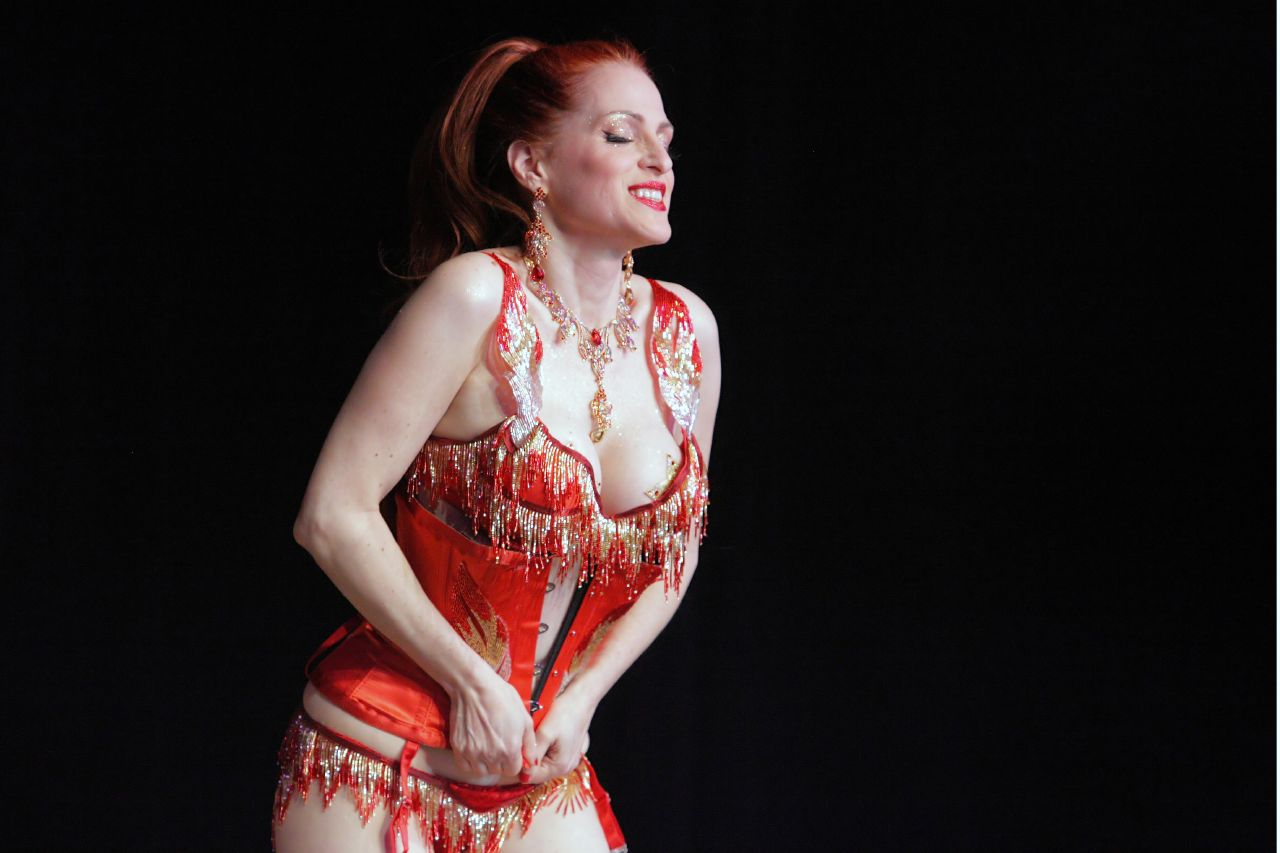
Weldon performing at Miss Exotic World Pageant in 2007

Weldon's burlesque style spans classical burlesque to avant garde performance art. In her signature Godzilla act she strips from a monster costume to a mashup of Blue Öyster Cult's song "Godzilla" and sound clips from the original Godzilla movie. Weldon describes herself as "an absurdist and a surrealist as well as a lover of glamour." She has performed internationally and in unusual venues such as the New York Public Library, where she performed a tribute to Gypsy Rose Lee as part of the Gypsy Centennial celebration.

Weldon is co-executive director of education at the Burlesque Hall of Fame in Las Vegas, Nevada. She has judged and coordinated judging for the Hall's Miss Exotic World Pageant. In 2012 she was awarded the Sassy Lassy Award for Recognition of Outstanding Contribution to the Art of Burlesque.

Weldon was inspired by the sideshows and burlesque shows of Coney Island in the mid-1990s, and has moderated the Wild Women Panel, among others, as part of Coney Island's annual Congress of Curious People. Weldon has produced shows for Coney Island's Burlesque at the Beach series, including her annual Follies Fromage, a show based entirely on cheese, and the autobiographical God-Damned Women show. She is the coordinator and lead instructor of the Coney Island University Master Class in Burlesque.

== Teaching and The New York School of Burlesque ==
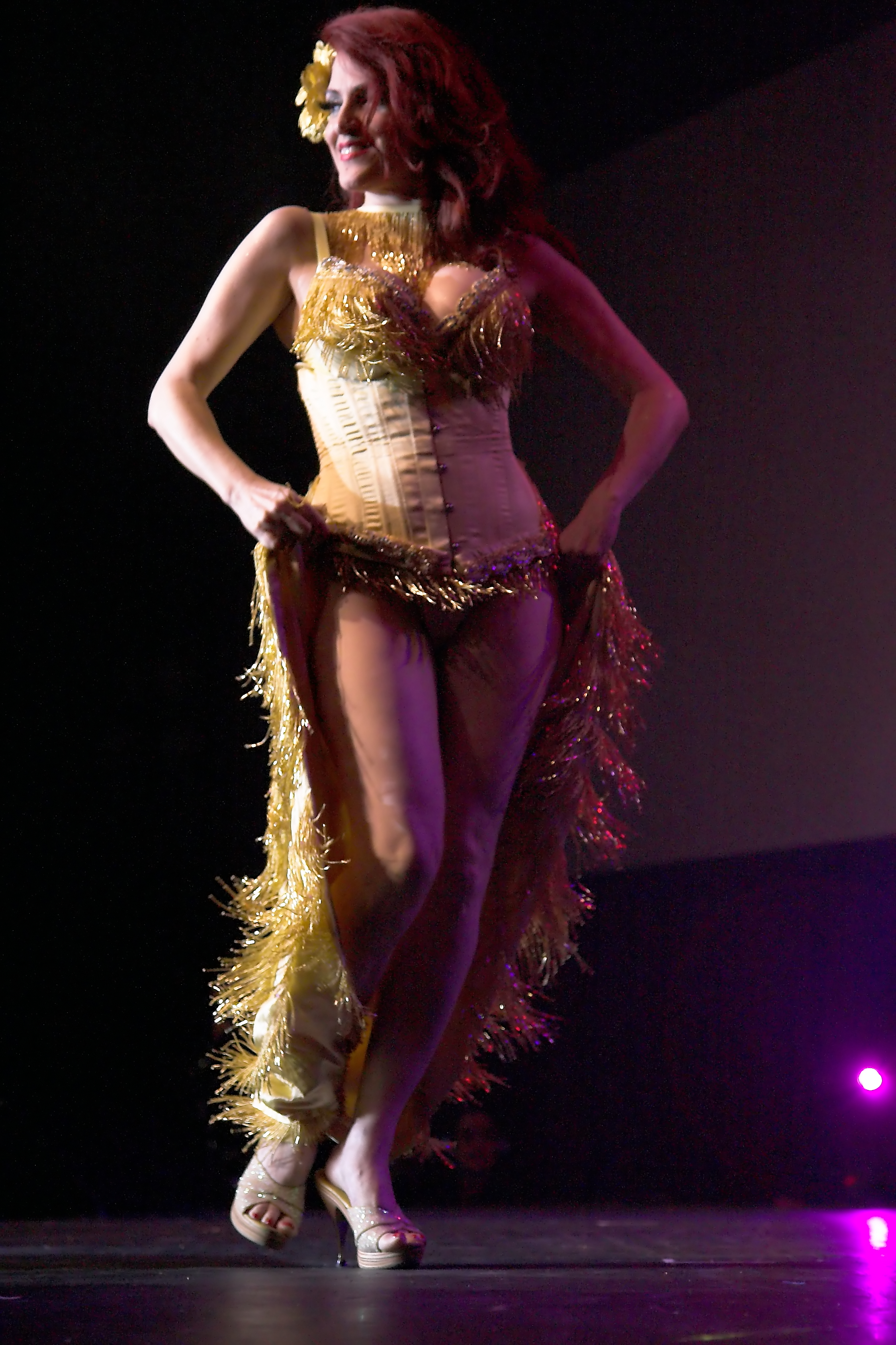
Weldon performing at BHF in 2010.

Weldon is an educator and authority on the topic of burlesque. She is the founder, in 2003, and headmistress of The New York School of Burlesque. The school has taught disabled performers at DaDaFest in Liverpool, UK, and taught breast cancer survivors through its Pink Light Burlesque program.

Weldon is the founder of Pink Light Burlesque, an organization to provide burlesque classes free of cost to breast cancer patients and survivors. The first Pink Light Burlesque showcase in December 2011 was featured in TIME. Pink Light Burlesque classes have been held in Seattle, New York and New Zealand.

== Published works ==
=== The Burlesque Handbook ===
Weldon is author The Burlesque Handbook (HarperCollins/ItBooks 2010), which developed from a compilation of her class handouts and from a 50-page ebook that she had already produced covering technique and performance. It has a foreword by comedian Margaret Cho.

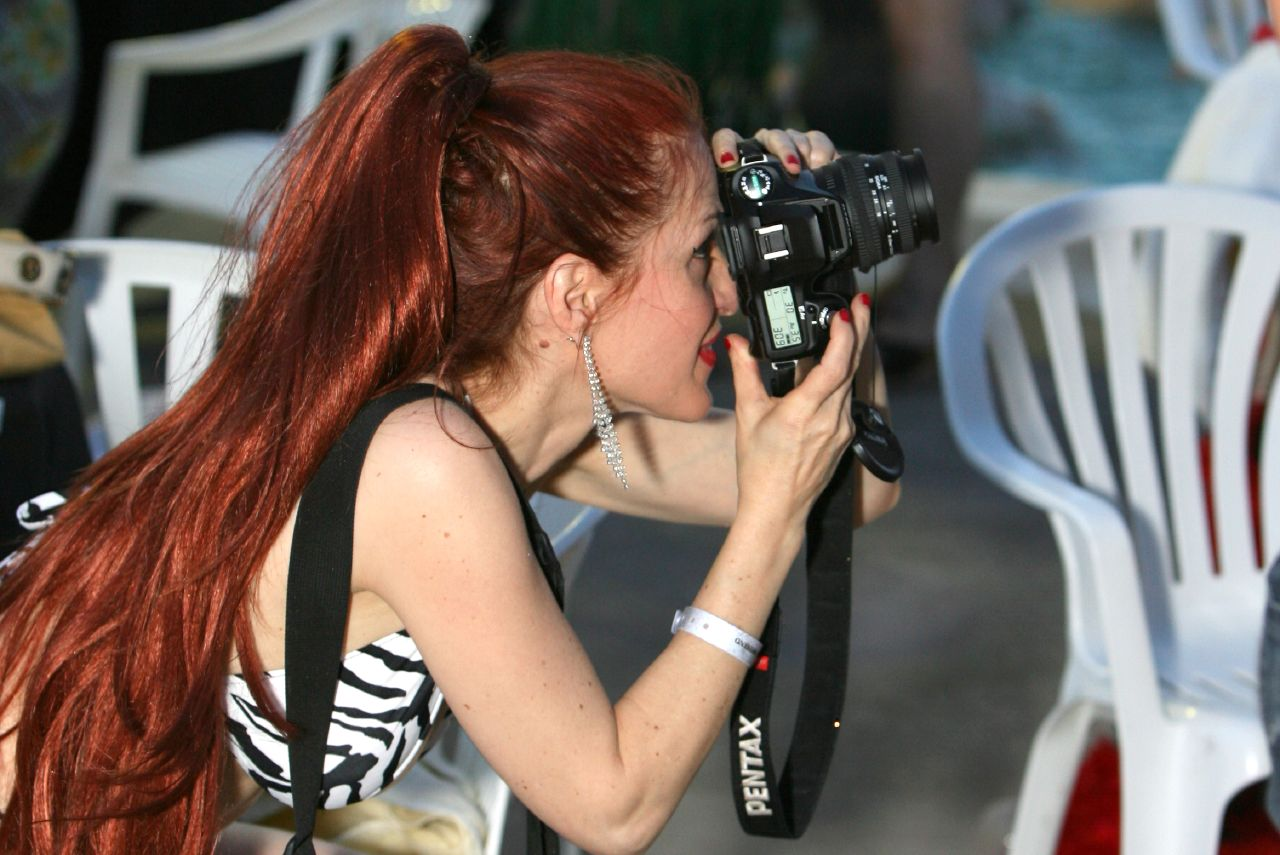
Weldon taking photos at Miss Exotic World (2007).

=== Fierce: The History of Leopard Print ===
Weldon's second book is Fierce: The History of Leopard Print (Harper Design; Illustrated edition (June 26, 2018) Fierce chronicles the history of one of the world's most beloved fashion patterns, leopard print, celebrating its beauty and place in couture, and the women who have dared to wear it.

=== Blogging ===
From 2001 to 2010, Weldon produced the website G-Strings Forever, a collection of photographs and articles about stripping and burlesque. She maintained a LiveJournal account from 2004 to 2010 where she wrote extensively on burlesque, sex work, and women's issues. Since 2007 Weldon has written the burlesque blog Burlesque Daily. From 2010 to 2011, Weldon answered burlesque questions on her Formspring account. She writes a burlesque etiquette column for Pin Curl Magazine.

=== Other ===
Weldon publishes essays and articles on the topics of stripping, sex-worker rights, burlesque history, and burlesque performance. She has consulted for, and was profiled in two webisodes of, the movie Burlesque.

== Sex-work advocacy ==
Weldon supports and works for the rights of strippers and other sex workers. She has attended and spoken at academic conferences, including the 1999 Socialist Scholar's Conference, the American Philosophical Association Pacific Division Meeting, the International Congress on Prostitution, and the United Nations Beijing Plus Five Conference, where she lobbied for the adoption of the term "sex work" and for a distinction between forced and voluntary sex work. Weldon has written articles on sex work and sex worker rights. Weldon also toured with the Sex Worker Arts Show, and co-produced W.O.(e).R.D., Women of experience Read Downtown, a performance reading of literary works by undomesticated women.

== Television and film appearances ==
Year	Appearance	Role	Notes
1999	Time Square Clean-Up	Herself	TV, Documentary
1999–2006	SexTV	Herself	TV series documentary
2005	Leonard Cohen: I'm Your Man	Burlesque Beauty	Documentary, biography
2006	Monja satanica	Estudiante Amore	Short horror
2006	Tales of Times Square	Anna Turner	Documentary
2006	Alison Lapper/Spread Magazine/Lust Circus	Herself	TV, Documentary
2007	What Not to Wear	Herself	TV, Reality
2008, 2009	Gossip Girl		TV, Drama, Romance
2009	No Strings Attached	Herself – Jo Boobs	Short
2010	Dirty Martini and the New Burlesque	Herself – Jo Boobs	Documentary
2010	The Real Housewives of New York City	Herself	TV, Reality
2011	Show Me How You Burlesque	Herself	Webisodes, Documentary

== Books, essays and DVDs ==
Essays

- Editors: Brewer, Gwen; Bullough, Vern L; Douglas, Jeffrey J; Elias, James E, Elias, Veronica Diehl. Porn 101: Eroticism Pornography and the First Amendment (Prometheus Books, 1999) Collection of essays including: Weldon, Jo. Topping from Below: Does Female Dominant Pornography Endorse the Rape of Women?
- Editors: Egan, Danielle; Frank, Katherine; Johnson, Merri Lisa. Flesh for Fantasy: Producing and Consuming Exotic Dance (Seal Press 2004) Collection of essays including: Weldon, Jo. Whipped Cream, Fire Eating, and the Other Delights of Feature Dancing
- Editors: Kramer Bussel, Rachel; Tyler, Alison. Hide and Seek: Erotic Tales of Voyeurs and Exhibitionists (Cleis Press, 2010) Weldon, Jo. Forward: Opening Doors

DVDs

- Director: Weldon, Jo. Featuring: Weldon, Jo. Honey and Spice: Sensual and Fierce Burlesque Studio: World Dance New York (2009) DVD / instant video
- Director: Weldon, Jo. Featuring: Weldon, Jo. Silk and Feathers: Burlesque Fan Dance Studio: World Dance New York (2009) DVD / instant video
- Director: Weldon, Jo. Featuring: Weldon, Jo. Striptease for Burlesque, Exotic Dance & Every Day Studio: World Dance New York (2009) DVD / instant video

Books

- Weldon, Jo. The Burlesque Handbook (It Books, 2010)
- Weldon, Jo. Fierce: The History of Leopard Print (HarperCollins, 2018)
