= Drink the Sea =

Studio album by the Glitch Mob
- Released: May 25, 2010
- Genre: Glitch; IDM
- Length: 59:31
- Label: Glass Air Records
- Producer: edIT; Boreta; Ooah

The Glitch Mob chronology
Drink the Sea (2010)	Love Death Immortality (2014)

Professional ratings
Review scores
Source	Rating
PopMatters	4/10 stars
URB	4/5 stars

Drink the Sea is the first studio album by American electronic music trio the Glitch Mob. It was released on Glass Air Records on May 25, 2010. It peaked at number 15 on the Billboard Top Dance/Electronic Albums chart, as well as number 39 on the Heatseekers Albums chart.

== Track listing ==
No.	Title	Length
1.	"Animus Vox"	6:45
2.	"Bad Wings"	6:40
3.	"How to Be Eaten by a Woman"	6:00
4.	"A Dream Within a Dream"	5:24
5.	"Fistful of Silence"	5:11
6.	"Between Two Points" (featuring Swan)	5:37
7.	"We Swarm"	5:54
8.	"Drive It Like You Stole It"	5:55
9.	"Fortune Days"	6:23
10.	"Starve the Ego, Feed the Soul"	5:49

== Charts ==
Chart	Peak position
US Top Dance/Electronic Albums (Billboard)	15
US Heatseekers Albums (Billboard)	39
