= Beats Antique =

American-based experimental music group

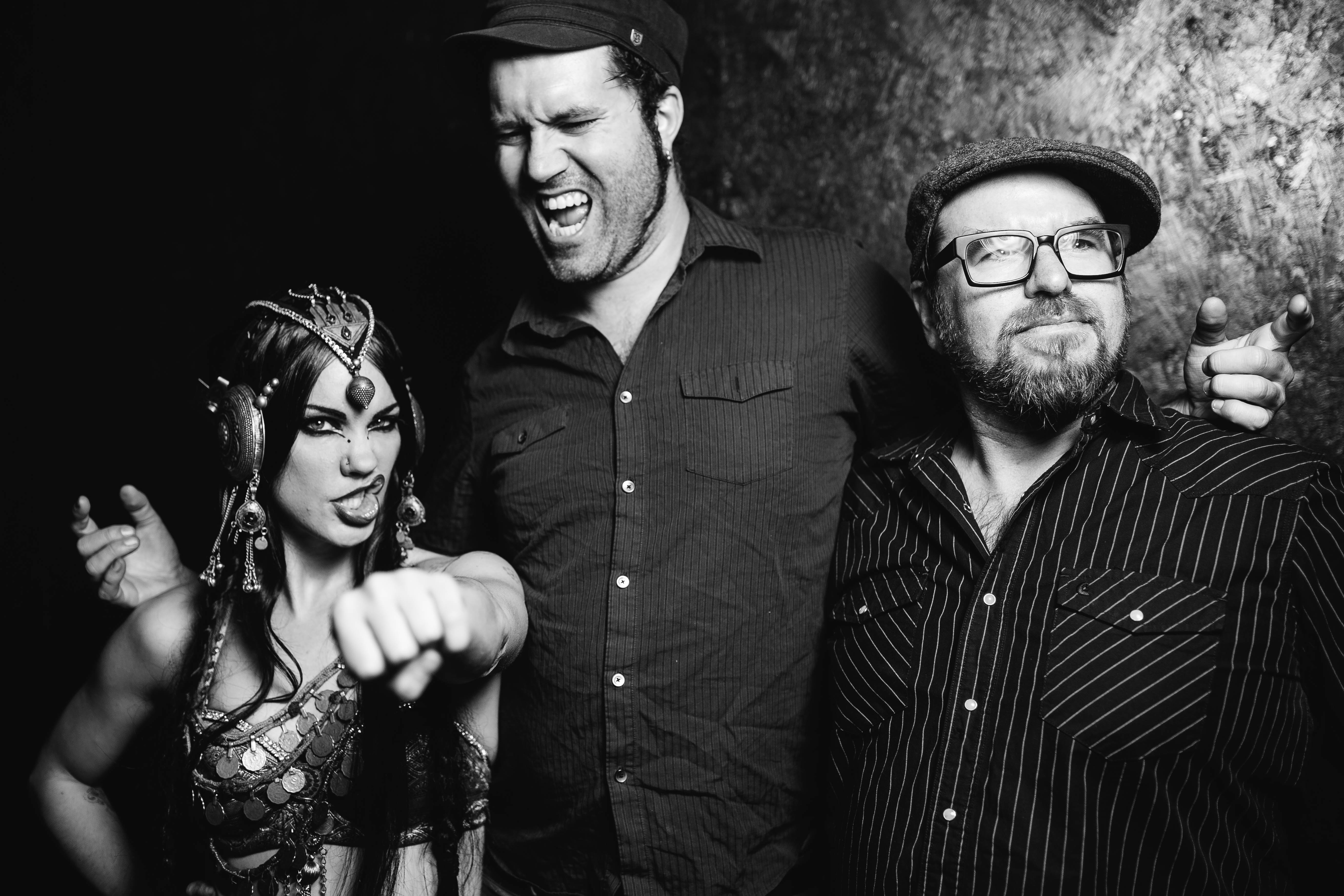
- Press photo for their 2013 tour.

Background information
- Origin: Oakland, California, U.S.
- Genres: Electronic, world, ethnotronica
- Years active: 2007–present
- Labels: CIA, Antique Records
- Members: David Satori; Zoe Jakes; Tommy "Sidecar" Cappel

Beats Antique is a U.S.-based experimental world fusion and electronic music group. Formed in 2007 in conjunction with producer Miles Copeland, the group has become noted for their mix of different genres as well as their live shows, which mix samples and heavy percussives with Tribal Fusion dance and performance art.

== History ==
David Satori, born in Burlington, Vermont in 1979, brings experience with many different styles of world music to the collaborative drawing board of Beats Antique. He began playing music while at Burlington High School, and graduated from the California Institute of the Arts with a degree in music performance and composition. While attending CIA, he formed an experimental instrumental group called The Funnies. The Funnies recorded two albums, and toured in an eco-bus that ran entirely on recycled vegetable oil. In 2003, Satori moved to San Francisco to join Aphrodesia, a ten-piece afro-beat group. Aphrodesia toured the U.S. and made a trip to Nigeria and traveled throughout West Africa playing music. The afro-beat group's tour ended in a performance at the New Shrine in Lagos, a venue built by the son of afro-beat composer and player Fela Kuti. His son Femi Kuti also sat in with Aphrodesia, and inspired Satori to produce their 2007 album, Lagos by Bus. In 2004, back in San Francisco, Satori and Zoe Jakes met and began dating.

Zoe Jakes began belly dancing in 2000, but is a lifelong dancer, having 10 years of jazz and ballet dance experience under her belt. Her belly dancing is a blend of traditional belly dance with tango, popping, and Indian dance. She toured with the Yard Dogs Road Show for five years, performed with the Extra Action Marching Band, and has been touring with The Indigo Belly Dance Company for four years. She began touring with Bellydance Superstars in 2005, a dance company produced by Miles Copeland. Jakes and Satori began working with Ableton Live, and this is when she began to experiment with electronic music.

Tommy Cappel met Zoe Jakes when they were both members of Extra Action Marching Band. Satori and Cappel met years ago when Satori brought him in to play drums for a Burning Man decompression party. Cappel grew up in Fairfax, Virginia. The son of two music teachers and the brother of a drummer, Cappel was always surrounded by music. At a young age he took up his brother's drum set, and was playing with a band of friends by the age of six. Influenced by his father's jazz LP's and his brothers prog rock and heavy metal music, Cappel became very interested in percussion. In the 1990s, Cappel attended the Berklee College of Music in Boston for a degree in studio drumming. At Berklee, Cappel studied New Orleans jazz, bebop, modern jazz, and world music. When one of his teachers needed help transcribing African and Arab drum patterns to a drum kit, Cappel helped and learned a lot of non-jazz rhythmic patterns. After graduating, he moved to New York City and began exploring many different types of genres. He would spend a lot of time at the Bell, a café in Manhattan that held free music jams. When a group of friends and musicians moved to San Francisco, Cappel joined them.

Beats Antique was then formed in San Francisco in 2007 when Zoe Jakes approached her manager, Miles Copeland (brother of drummer Stewart Copeland of The Police) about creating an album. Copeland green lit the project, and their debut album Tribal Derivations was conceived on Copeland's CIA record label. Tribal Derivations was a concept album, created to complement the dance styles of producer/arranger Zoe Jakes. The group's second album, Collide, reached the top 10 of most downloaded artists under the Middle East and World Dance and the top 20 most downloaded electronic albums on Amazon. For their third album, Contraption Vol. 1, Beats Antique brought in collaborators such as hammered dulcimer player Jamie Janover, and beat boxer and hip-hop vocalist LYNX. Their 2010 release Blind Threshold featured harmonica player John Popper of Blues Traveler. The 10-track Elektraphone was released October 4, 2011 supported by a 26-city tour running from October to December 2011.

Beats Antique released an 8-song EP follow up to Contraption Vol. 1 on August 18, 2012 entitled Contraption Vol. 2, which includes horns features from Balkan Brass Band, Brass Menazeri, vocals from hip-hop vocalist LYNX & a remix of Filastine's "Colony Collapse." Later that year, David Satori teamed up with Evan Fraser, a fellow student at the California Institute of Arts, and formed the side project, Dirtwire and released a self-titled album through Beats Antique Records on October 1, 2013.

In October 2013, Beats Antique released A Thousand Faces: Act I, followed by A Thousand Faces: Act II in April 2014. Featuring artists include Alam Khan, LYNX, SORNE, Micha & Leighton, and the Antibalas horns. Les Claypool was also featured on the A Thousand Faces: Act I single, “Beelzebub.”

In fall of 2014, Beats Antique toured with Shpongle (Simon Posford DJ Sets), Emancipator, and Lafa Taylor as part of their “Creature Carnival” tour. Featuring carnival-themed performers specific to each city, audience participation, and crafting events surrounding four “Creatures” (Light Saber the tiger, Al Eyes the owl, Jackie Lope the Antelope, and Squidzilla the squid), attendees of the shows were encouraged to dress wildly and come prepared with customized Creature masks. Selections from two of these performances, in Denver, Colorado and Asheville, North Carolina, were compiled into their latest release, titled Creature Carnival Live.

== Musical style ==
The styles combined to create Beats Antique's sound are a union of old and new inspirations. There are infusions of Middle Eastern belly dance music, down tempo, hip-hop, old school jazz, afro-beat, and many styles of electronic music. The musicians have been influenced by their diverse musical backgrounds. They incorporate many live instruments to produce their style of music.

== Discography ==
- 2007: Tribal Derivations
- 2008: Collide
- 2009: Contraption Vol. 1 (EP)
- 2010: The Trunk Archives (EP)
- 2010: Blind Threshold
- 2011: Elektrafone
- 2012: Contraption Vol. 2 (EP)
- 2013: A Thousand Faces: Act I
- 2014: A Thousand Faces: Act II
- 2015: Creature Carnival Live
- 2016: Shadowbox
- 2023: Varanasi (EP)
- 2025: Metamorphosis
