= Love Death Immortality =

2014 studio album by the Glitch Mob

Studio album by The Glitch Mob
- Released: February 11, 2014
- Genres: Glitch; electronic rock; EDM; dubstep
- Length: 52:07
- Label: Glass Air Records
- Producers: edIT; Boreta; Ooah

The Glitch Mob chronology
Drink the Sea (2010)	Love Death Immortality (2014)	See Without Eyes (2018)

Professional ratings
Review scores
Source	Rating
AllMusic	4/5 stars
Consequence of Sound	C
Sputnikmusic	2/5

Love Death Immortality is the second studio album by the American electronic music trio the Glitch Mob. It was released on Glass Air Records on February 11, 2014. The album debuted at number 13 on the Billboard 200; as of June 2014, it had sold 40,000 copies in the United States.

The Glitch Mob explored a different style of music and a "stadium sound" on the sophomore album. "We always like to challenge ourselves, try different things, try different tempos and sounds of mixing music, working with vocalists, and pushing ourselves to explore new ideas and other ways to tell our story," said Josh Mayer in an interview.

== Track listing ==
No.	Title	Length
1.	"Mind of a Beast"	4:16
2.	"Our Demons" (featuring Aja Volkman)	5:16
3.	"Skullclub"	5:48
4.	"Becoming Harmonious" (featuring Metal Mother)	4:40
5.	"Can't Kill Us"	4:40
6.	"I Need My Memory Back" (featuring Aja Volkman)	5:47
7.	"Skytoucher"	6:08
8.	"Fly by Night Only" (featuring Yaarrohs)	4:46
9.	"Carry the Sun"	4:56
10.	"Beauty of the Unhidden Heart" (featuring Sister Crayon)	4:29

== Charts ==
=== Weekly charts ===
Chart (2014)	Peak position
Australian Albums (ARIA)	70
Belgian Albums (Ultratop Flanders)	133
Belgian Albums (Ultratop Wallonia)	114
Canadian Albums (Billboard)	23
Scottish Albums (Official Charts)	95
Swiss Albums (Schweizer Hitparade)	34
UK Albums (Official Charts)	75
UK Dance Albums (Official Charts)	6
US Billboard 200	13
US Top Dance Albums (Billboard)	1

=== Year-end charts ===
Chart (2014)	Position
US Top Dance/Electronic Albums (Billboard)	16
