= Tribal Fusion =

Modern Western form of belly dance

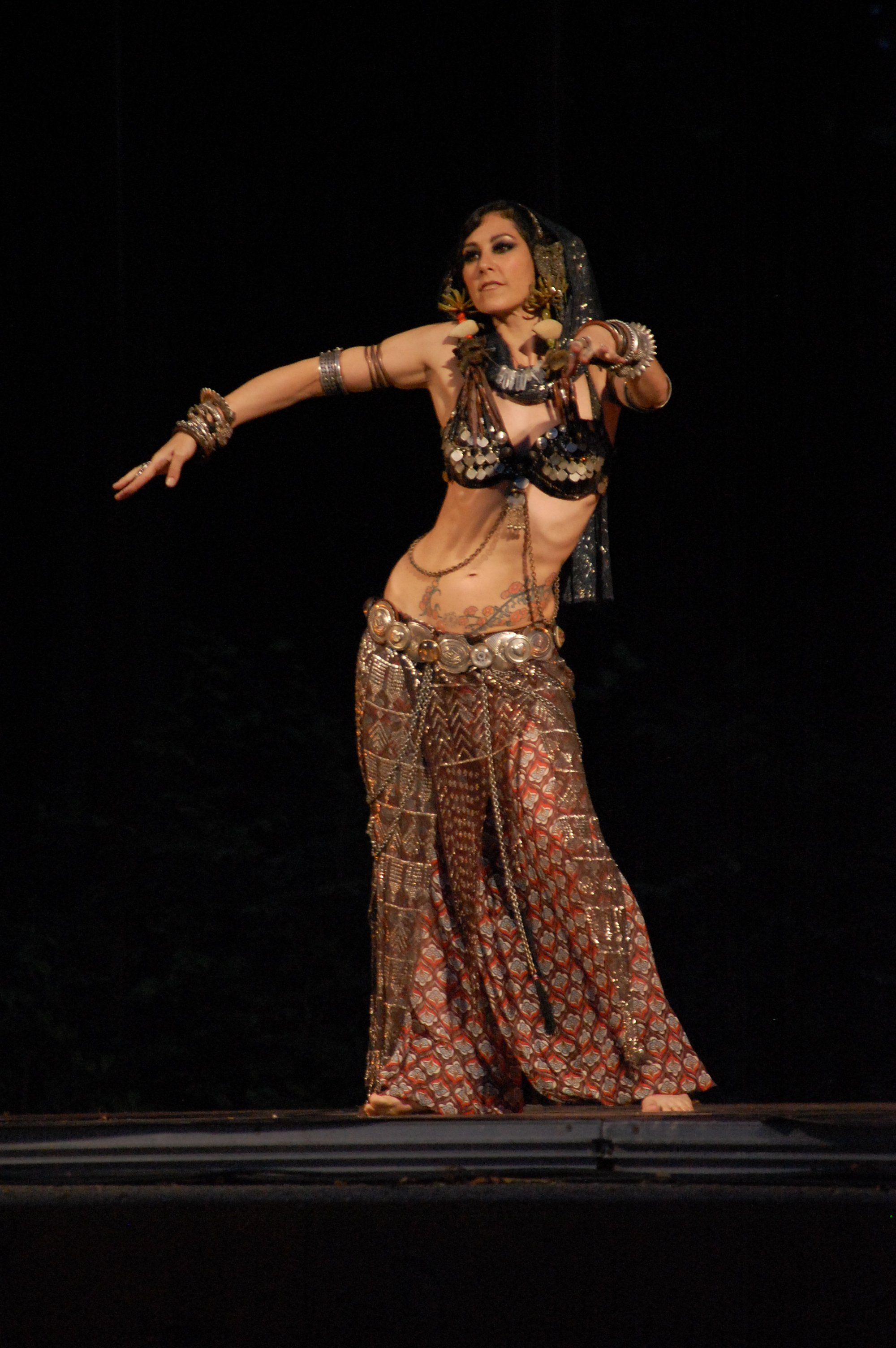
Rachel Brice

Tribal Fusion Belly Dance is a modern Western form of belly dance that was created by fusing American Tribal Style belly dance and American Cabaret belly dance. Artists frequently incorporate elements from Popping, Hip Hop, 'Egyptian' or 'Cabaret' belly dance, as well as movement principles from traditional forms such as Flamenco, Kathak, Odissi, and other folkloric and classical dance styles.

== History ==
Tribal Fusion Dance is a branch of the American Tribal Style Belly Dance, or "ATS" movement. ATS, now known as Fatchance Bellydance, was popularized in the early 1990s by Carolena Nericcio, the director of Fat Chance Belly Dance. This style fused several different dance styles outside of the Belly Dance genre, and was a codification of her teacher Masha Archer's style.

The first Tribal Fusion dance company (although there was no name for it at the time, they simply called it Belly Dance Theatre) was Jill Parker's Ultra Gypsy. Jill Parker is often referred to as the "mama of Tribal Fusion". Ultra Gypsy expanded on the American Tribal Style repertoire of movement, costuming, and music. "In the late 1990s Jill and her dance company, Ultra Gypsy, began to scale down the tribal costume, expand the movement vocabulary, work with modern DJ mixed music and play with theatrical themes in their performances. This had a significant impact on tribal dancers and opened up the floodgates of Tribal Fusion innovation." An early example of Ultra Gypsy's work was filmed by the cable TV program "The Cutting Edge", produced by Jerry B in Berkeley, California in 2001; directed and edited by D. Sosnoski.

Stephanie Barto, a student of Nericcio, brought ATS to the Midwest with a group called Read My Hips, founded in Chicago with Heather Stants. Later, during the early development of Tribal Fusion, Heather Stants worked to introduce new elements to Tribal Style bellydance, including a minimalist aesthetic, underground electronica music and elements of modern dance. In 1999, she formed Urban Tribal Dance Company in San Diego, largely influenced by hip hop and street dance styles. In contrast to many other tribal fusion performers, Urban Tribal Dance Company was known for their minimalist costuming more traditional to modern dance than to Tribal Style.

Tribal Fusion was largely popularized by Rachel Brice. In the early days, she referred to herself as "Cabaret with a Tribal aesthetic." Rachel Brice attributes the technique used by many tribal fusion dancers to Suhaila Salimpour. In an email conversation between Rachel Brice and Carolena Nericcio, Carolena wrote that Rachel performed a "Fusion." Rachel decided to refer to herself as "Tribal Fusion," to reflect that she was fusing the style of Fat Chance Belly Dance with other styles. This term stuck, and its definition has morphed as dancers have pursued it as a style of its own.

"Most people can agree that the poster girl of Tribal Fusion Belly Dance is Rachel Brice. Yet she herself writes, 'The real dance heroes that created and fed my personal dance lineage: Jamila Salimpour taught John Compton and Masha Archer, who taught Carolena Nericcio, who taught Jill Parker, who taught Heather Stants, who taught Mardi Love, who all taught me.'

It is this lineage of teachers that has created Tribal Fusion Belly Dance. In the 1960s, the belly dancer Jamila Salimpour created the company “Bal Anat” and performed with her dancers at California Renaissance fairs. The need to fit belly dance into a renaissance style led to a show that drew from the tribal dances and costuming of North Africa and the Eastern Mediterranean. Props such as masks, snakes, and swords added a theatrical element to the dancing.

Jamila Salimpour taught Masha Archer, who formed the “San Francisco Classic Dance Troupe”. As a trained painter and sculptor, a core part of Masha’s teachings was the goal of creating art through dance. One of her students, Carolena Nericcio, took this goal to a new level by creating an original dance form, which is called “American Tribal Style” belly dance or “ATS”. It is from ATS that Tribal Fusion set its foundation."

Mardi Love, a pioneer in Tribal Fusion, was an early member of Urban Tribal with Heather Stants, later joining The Indigo with Rachel Brice. Zoe Jakes was a long time and contributing member of The Indigo, going on to create her own form of Avant Garde belly dance with Beats Antique. Rachel Brice also greatly contributed to the popularity of movements similar to popping, though she credits Suhaila Salimpour and former troupe mate Ariellah Aflalo as the sources. Initial members of The Indigo performance group were Mardi Love, Rachel Brice, Michelle Campbell, Sharon Kihara, Shawna Rai, Janice Solimeno, and Ariellah Aflalo. Sharon Kihara also studied with Frederique (The Lady Fred) and performed with Ultra Gypsy.

Today, Tribal Fusion is a rapidly growing and evolving dance form. Some feel it is moving away from its American Tribal Style Belly Dance Roots, and some newer Tribal Fusion Dancers have never studied American Tribal Style Belly Dance. For the founders of the form, however, the connection with American Tribal Style Belly Dance is what makes it considered "Tribal Fusion Belly Dance", rather than simply "Fusion Belly Dance".

== Costume ==
Many Tribal Fusion dancers once used the ATS "uniform" as a basis for costuming, the scenario is changing. Additional elements of the costume are strongly influenced by the nature of the fusion - flamenco fusion dancers will wear flamenco skirts, burlesque fusion dancers will wear feathers etc. Costumes are often very elaborate with layers of fabrics, Tulle bi telli, antique tribal jewelry from many cultures, hair ornaments, and permanent body adornment such as tattoos and piercings. At the other extreme, where the fusion has a strong contemporary influence, the costume is pared down to a sleek minimalist style.

Mardi Love pioneered and paved the way for many of the elements of the more adorned Tribal Fusion costumes that are popular today. After working with the more minimalist Urban Tribal, she helped sculpt the intricate, vibrant, and complicated costumes worn by The Indigo. She is the artist who popularized Rajasthani cowrie falls for the hair, using colorful, hand dyed yarn to braid cowrie shells together. She also created one of the most popular belt styles of the mid-to late 2000s by combining Indian mirrored "shisha" with Afghan Guls (beaded medallions), and adding colorful yarn fringe (such as Colinette Pointe 5).

== Subgenres ==
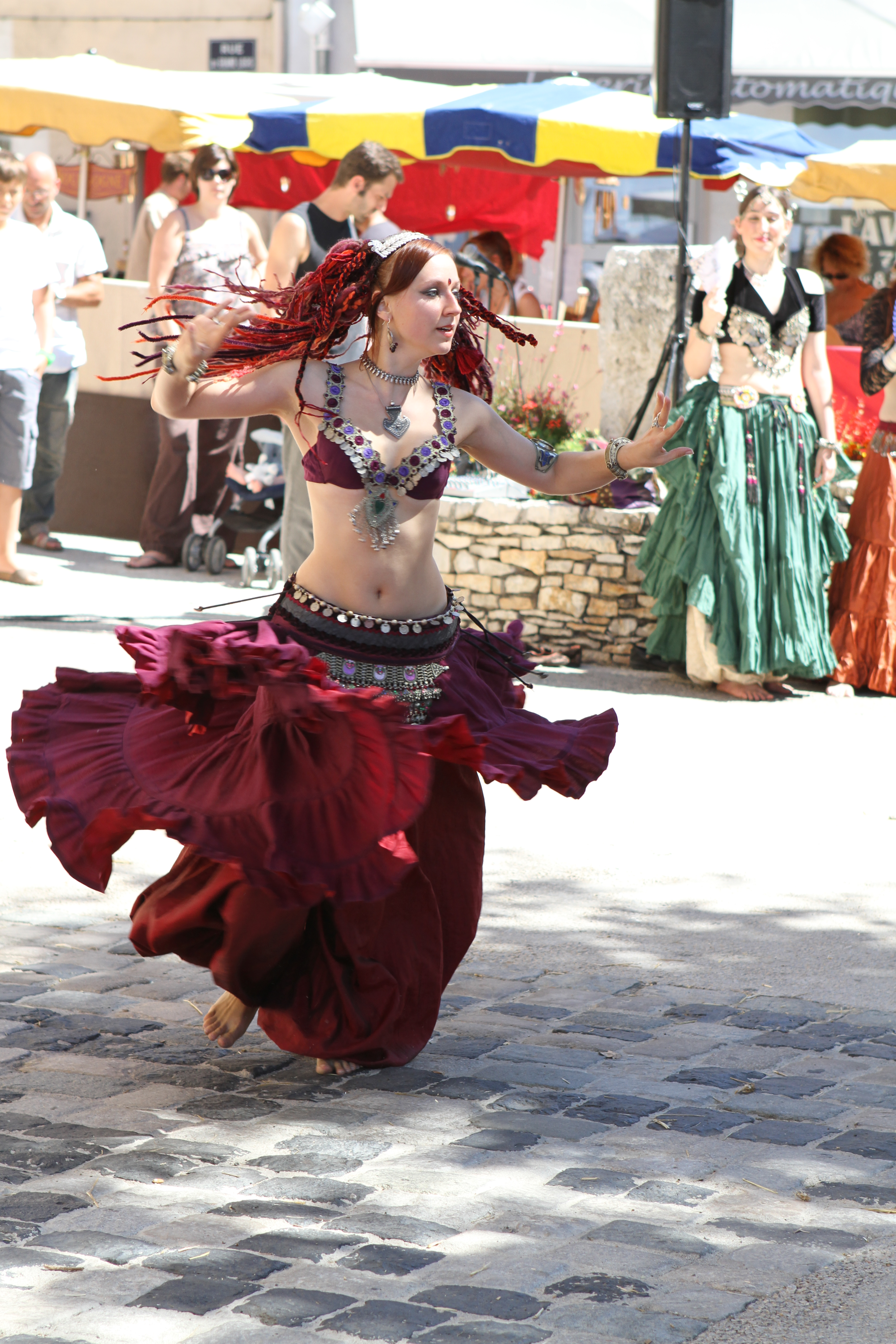
Balkys, a dancer performing in France

Tribal Fusion is closely related to Dark Fusion pioneered by Ariellah Aflalo, and Improvisational Tribal Style (ITS) bellydance pioneered by Amy Sigil. Tribal Fusion and ITS are both descended from American Tribal Style (ATS) while Dark Fusion exists between Tribal Fusion and Gothic belly dance.

Vaudeville bellydance is an emerging style of tribal fusion bellydance that uses cultural elements of the mid-1800s through the 1930s. The rising popularity of this style is partially due to The Indigo and their show Le Serpent Rouge. Vaudeville bellydance often uses jazz, swing, blues, Balkan, or Middle Eastern-derived music (Beats Antique is a prime example). The costumes are perhaps the most recognizable feature of vaudeville bellydance because they almost always incorporate style influences from the Jazz Era and earlier. As the name vaudeville bellydance suggests, this style is deeply inspired by pre-WWII vaudeville acts, often incorporating comedy into performances. Vaudeville bellydance can also be called tribal vintage style, although vaudeville bellydance is typically inspired by a more narrow time period. This form is closely associated with Burlesque fusion bellydance and much overlap exists between them. Both styles have strongly influenced the tribal fusion genre overall.

Other popular tribal fusion subtypes include steampunk, Art Nouveau, gothic fusion bellydance, world fusion, theatrical bellydance, and urban tribal which is a hip-hop/jazz dance fusion. Many tribal fusion dancers also practice other movement arts such as aerialism, hatha yoga, hooping, fire spinning, poi and other flow arts, juggling, contemporary circus, erotic dance and burlesque, ballet, global folk dance, gymnastics, and martial arts; as such, influences from these arts can be witnessed firsthand in the acts presented at haflas and festivals across the country.

== Music ==
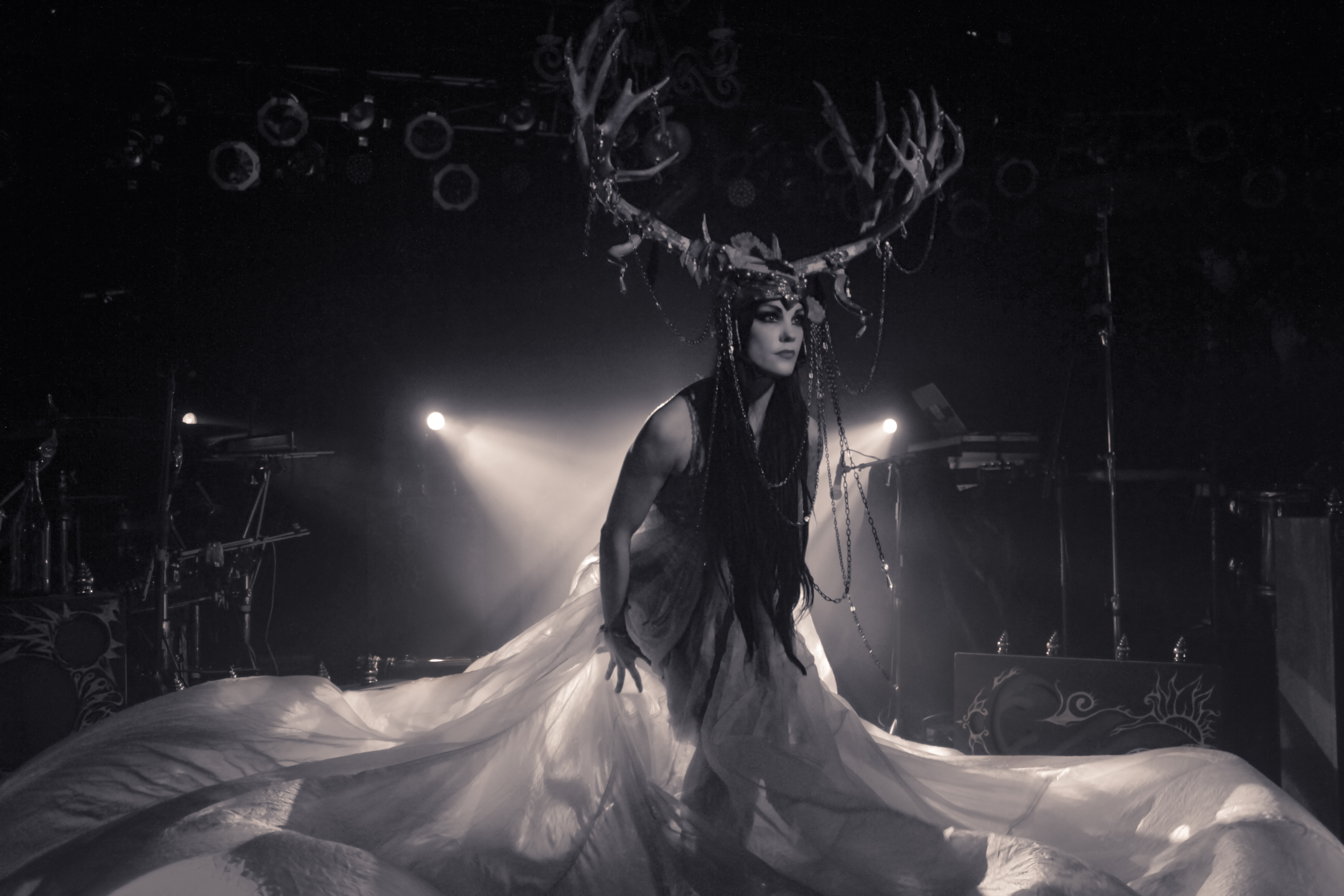
Zoe Jakes performing to Beats Antique

Tribal Fusion dance evolved closely with developments in the electronica and world music genres. Early Bay Area DJs who contributed to the form include Cheb i Sabbah & Bassnectar. The movement carried over into the music produced specifically for bellydancers, also called Oriental music, giving rise to the creation of the electronica Oriental genre. Artist Jeremiah Soto of Solace and Eventide Musical Productions produced some of the first Electronica Oriental albums, quickly followed by Turbo Tabla artist Karim Nagi, and beatboxing champion Pete List. Many more names followed suit creating a rapidly growing musical outlet for the budding new dance form. Producer Miles Copeland contributed greatly to the electronica Oriental movement signing many musicians and dancers who would become forerunners of the Tribal Fusion movement.

Some popular musicians associated with Tribal Fusion bellydance are:

- Amon Tobin
- Squarepusher
- Beats Antique
- Balkan Bump
- Dead Can Dance
- Djinn (Band)
- Maduro
- Pentaphobe
- Solace

== See also ==
- American Tribal Style Belly Dance
- Improvisational Team Sync (ITS) Dance
- Bellydance Superstars
- Rachel Brice
