= Improvisational Team Synchronization =

Improvisational Team Synchronization, Improv Team Sync, or ITS (formerly Improvisational Tribal Style) belly dance is a style of group dance improvisation, often associated with Tribal Fusion and belly dance. ITS is performed by a group of dancers consisting of one of more leaders and followers. The dance relies on a shared vocabulary of movements, each initiated by the leader using a distinct cue movement. After the cue, a short choreographed movement sequence, or combo, is performed by the group. The leader chooses the combo based on their interpretation of the music, which is often done spontaneously during the performance. The result is a dance that appears choreographed, but is in fact structured improvisation. This format of structured group improvisation was first developed by Carolena Nericcio-Bohlman, the founder of American Tribal Style.

== History ==
ITS was coined in 2006 by Amy Sigil of UNMATA to describe her improv vocabulary, as it evolved away from American Tribal Style to include street dance and hip-hop dance movements, music and aesthetics. Sigil first studied with Antara Nepa (Julia Carrol), director of the Ottoman Traders located in Folsom, California. Later she opened her own dance studio in Sacramento, California, and was introduced to American Tribal Style by Shawna Rai. Sigil used the basic improvisational format of American Tribal Style to develop a new vocabulary of movements, which evolved into ITS.

Other improvisational belly dance styles include: American Tribal Style, Synchronized Group Improv, Tribal Group Improv, American Improv Tribal, Group Improv Tribal. Although the various styles of dance improvisation associated with Tribal Fusion dance are rooted in the United States, Improvisational Tribal Style is taught and performed internationally.

== Characteristics ==
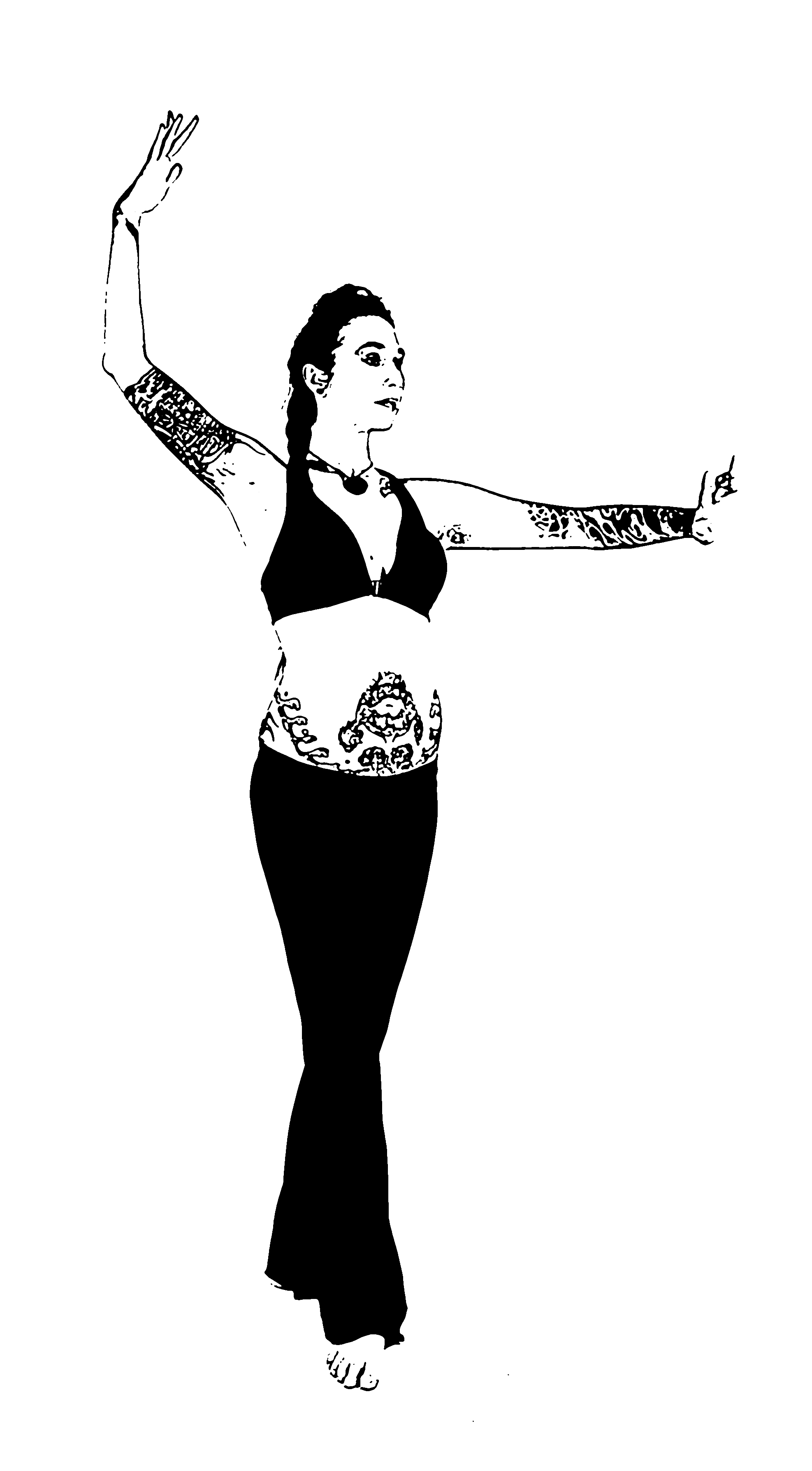
ITS dance movement/AmySigil

The ITS format is composed of three major elements: stall movements, combinations, and concepts.

=== Stall movements ===
An ITS stall movement has a minimum number of counts, which can be repeated indefinitely. A stall movement has no cue (but it does have a specific starting position, or "ground zero"), can be repeated indefinitely by the leader, and can usually be used to travel with (rotating leaders, changing formations, etc.).

=== Combinations ===
An ITS combination (or combo) is a sequence of movements that must be initiated by a unique cue, which have a defined beginning and end.

=== Concepts ===
ITS concepts are ideas that can be applied to stall moves. Concepts include formations, fadebacks, directional and timed turns.

== Costuming and aesthetics ==
Unlike American Tribal Style, which emphasizes elaborate multi-cultural costuming and jewelry, the costuming associated with ITS tends to be simple; often consisting of black pants, a metal belt and a tank top. Elements associated with Tribal Fusion costuming are also commonly incorporated into ITS, such as antique multi-cultural jewelry, and permanent body adornment such as tattoos and piercings. Costuming can vary widely depending on the performance context, however.
