= Interpretive dance =

Family of expressive modern dance styles

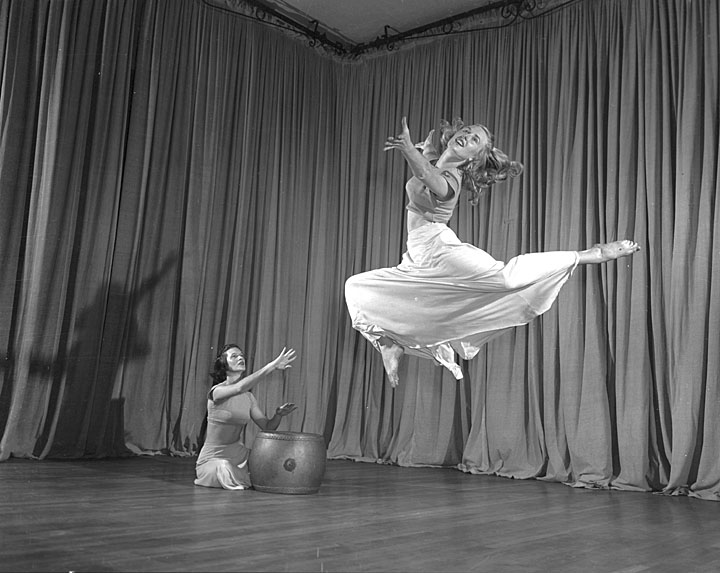
Women's interpretive dance class, University of Wisconsin–Madison, 1949

Interpretive dance is a family of modern dance styles that began around 1900 with Isadora Duncan. It used classical concert music but marked a departure from traditional concert dance, as a rebellion against the strict rules of classical ballet. It seeks to translate human emotions, conditions, situations or fantasies into movement and dramatic expression, as opposed to following a specific dance style or telling a linear story. It may also adapt traditional ethnic movements into more modern expressions.

== History ==
The roots of interpretive dance can be traced back to the work of Isadora Duncan and Ruth St. Denis in the early 1900s. Duncan rejected the rigid technique and restrictive costumes of ballet in favor of more natural, flowing movements performed barefoot and in loose-fitting tunics. St. Denis was influenced by Eastern dance and spirituality, incorporating elements like bare feet and elaborate costumes into her performances.

Other pioneers of interpretive dance in the early-to-mid 20th century included Martha Graham, who developed her own expressive technique and frequently explored psychological and social themes; Doris Humphrey, who experimented with fall and recovery; and Merce Cunningham, who embraced chance procedures and avant-garde music.

== Characteristics ==
Interpretive dance is characterized by:

- Use of movement to express an idea, feeling or story rather than showcase technical virtuosity
- Incorporation of freer, more natural movements compared to codified dance styles like ballet
- Exploration of new or unconventional movements, floor work and partnering
- Emotional expressiveness and intensity
- Frequent use of music, costumes, sets and lighting to enhance the mood or concept

While it was—and most often, still is—thought of as a performing art, interpretive dance does not have to be performed with music. It often includes grandiloquent movements of the arms, turns and drops to the floor.

== See also ==
- Dance improvisation
- Free dance
- Lyrical dance

== Sources ==
- Shelton, Suzanne (1981). Divine Dancer: A Biography of Ruth St. Denis. New York: Doubleday. ISBN 9780292770461.
