= The Glitch Mob =

American electronic music duo

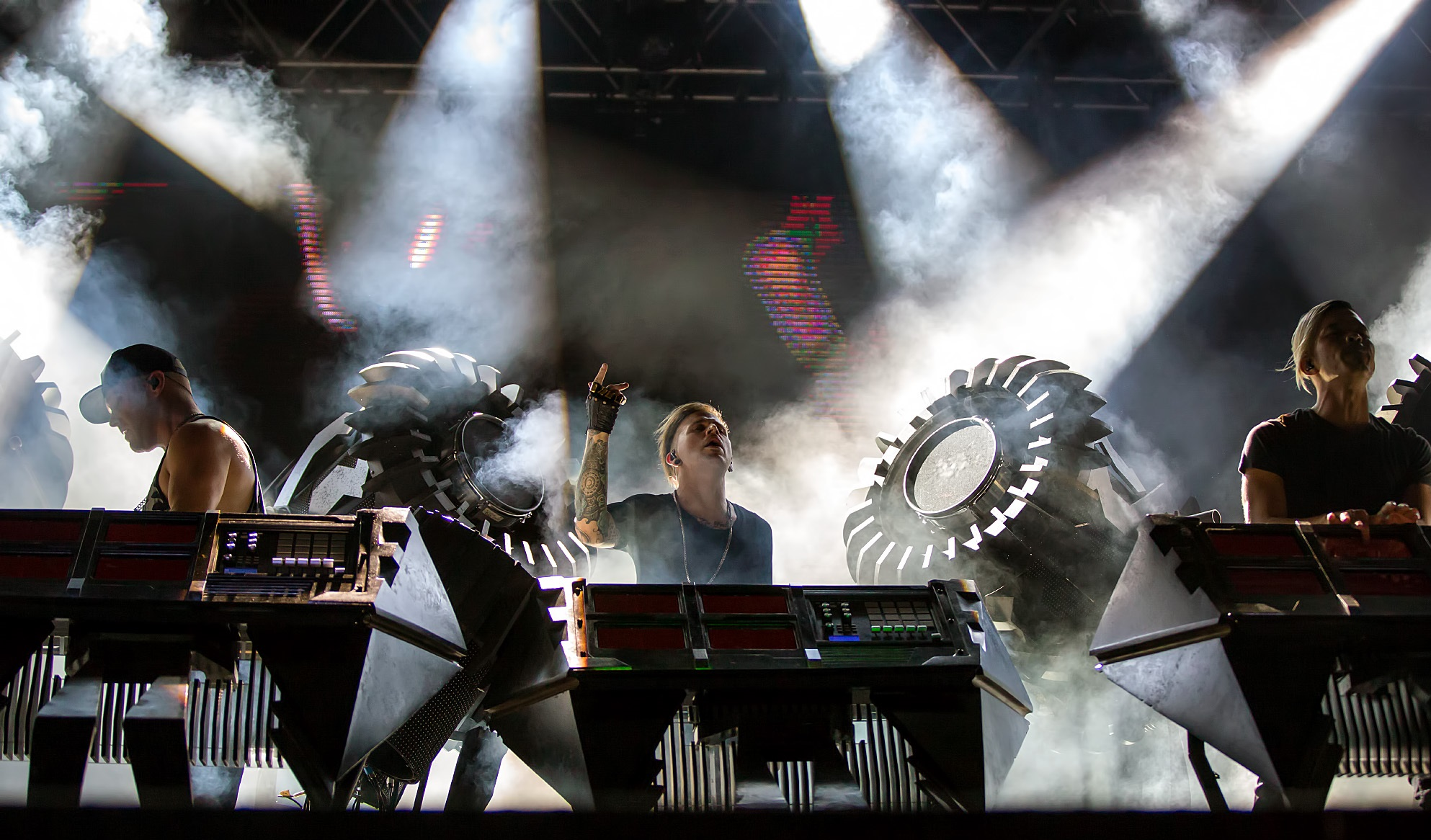
- The Glitch Mob performing in 2014

Background information
- Origin: Los Angeles, California, United States
- Genres: Glitch; electronic; IDM; industrial
- Years active: 2006–present
- Labels: Mishka; Glass Air
- Members: edIT (Edward Ma); Ooah (Josh Mayer)
- Past members: Boreta (Justin Boreta); Kraddy (Matthew Kratz)
- Website: theglitchmob.com

The Glitch Mob is an American electronic music duo from Los Angeles, California. It consists of edIT (Edward Ma) and Ooah (Josh Mayer). Boreta (Justin Boreta) was a member of the group from its formation until 2023. They have released four studio albums as well as a number of remix albums, EPs, and singles.

== History ==
The Glitch Mob was formed in Los Angeles in 2006 and originally consisted of Kraddy (Matthew Kratz), edIT (Edward Ma), Ooah (Josh Mayer), and Boreta (Justin Boreta). The group made a name for themselves with their live performances, using laptops and MIDI controllers like the Lemur. After gaining attention in Los Angeles and San Francisco, they eventually toured more widely along the West Coast and then to various festivals worldwide. After citing creative differences, founding member Kraddy left the group in 2009.

The Glitch Mob released their debut album, Drink the Sea, in May 2010, and Electronic Musician ran a cover story on the trio. The album peaked at number 57 on the CMJ Top 200 Chart for College Radio. The single "Drive It Like You Stole It" reached number 2 on XLR8R's Top Downloads of 2010 list.

Their second album, Love Death Immortality, released in February 2014, debuted at number 1 on the Billboard Dance/Electronic Songs chart in 2014 and at number 13 on the Billboard 200. The song "Skullclub" was featured in a 2015 ad for Amazon Echo.

The Glitch Mob went on to publish the albums See Without Eyes (2018) and Ctrl Alt Reality (2022). In September 2023, Boreta announced his departure from the group in order to focus on solo work.

The Glitch Mob composed the soundtrack for the 2026 video game Invincible VS.

== Discography ==
=== Albums ===
==== Studio albums ====
Title	Album details	Peak chart positions						
Title	Album details	US	US Dance	US Ind.	AUS	CAN	SCO	UK
Drink the Sea	Released: May 25, 2010; Label: Glass Air; Format: LP, digital download, streaming	—	15	—	—	—	—	—
Love Death Immortality	Released: February 11, 2014; Label: Glass Air; Format: LP, digital download, streaming	13	1	1	70	23	95	75
See Without Eyes	Released: May 4, 2018; Label: Glass Air; Format: LP, digital download, streaming	89	1	8	—	—	—	—
Ctrl Alt Reality	Released: November 18, 2022; Label: Glass Air; Format: LP, digital download, streaming	—	—	—	—	—	—	—

==== Remix albums ====
- Drink the Sea – The Remixes (2011)
- Drink the Sea – The Remixes Vol. 2 (2011)
- Love Death Immortality Remixes (2015)
- Drink the Sea (Ambient Version) (2020)
- Revisions (2021)

=== EPs ===
- We Can Make the World Stop (2011)
- Piece of the Indestructible (2015)
- Chemicals (2020)

=== Other albums ===
- Give Us Shelter (2025)
- Invincible VS (Original Game Soundtrack) (2026)

=== Singles ===
- "Drive It Like You Stole It" (2010)
- "We Can Make the World Stop" (2011)
- "How Could This Be Wrong" (featuring Tula) (2018)
- "I Could Be Anything" (featuring Elohim) (2018)
- "Rise" (featuring Mako and the Word Alive) (2018)
- "System Bleed" (with Lick) (2019)
- "Lazer Vision" (with Zeke Beats) (2019)
- "Momentary Lapse" (with 1788-L) (2019)
- "Collider" (2023)
- "Dream Sequence" with IMANU (2023)
- "Body Moves" with Samurai Breaks and UNIIQU3 (2023)
- "Move You" (2023)
- "Peace" (2023)
- "High Rezolution" (2024)
- "What Would We Do" with UFO! (2024)
- "Eeze Up" (2024)
- "NFINITY" (2024)
- "Wild Inside" (2024)
- "Not Backing Down (VS Main Theme)" (2026)
- "NO CTRL" (2026)

=== Mixtapes ===
- Local Area Network (2008)
- Crush Mode (2009)
- Drink the Sea Part II: The Mixtape (2010)
- More Voltage (2011)
- Do Lab Mix 2016 (2016)

=== Remixes ===
- Evil Nine – "All the Cash" (2008)
- Coheed and Cambria – "Feathers" (2008)
- STS9 – "Beyond Right Now" (2008)
- TV on the Radio – "Red Dress" (2009)
- Linkin Park – "Waiting for the End" (2010)
- Krazy Baldhead – "The 4th Movement" (2010)
- Daft Punk – "Derezzed" (2011)
- The White Stripes – "Seven Nation Army" (2011)
- Bassnectar – "Heads Up" (2012)
- The Prodigy – "Breathe" (2012)
- Metallica – "Lords of Summer" (2015)
- Ray Lynch – "Celestial Soda Pop" (Boreta Remix) (2015)
- Illenium – "Crawl Outta Love" (2018)
- Odesza featuring Sasha Sloan – "Falls" (2018)
- Ghost of Tsushima – "Saikuron" (2020)
- Noisia – "Collider" (2023)

=== Music videos ===
- Drink the Sea (full album, 2010)
- Love Death Immortality (full album, 2014)
- See Without Eyes (full album, 2018)
- "I Could Be Anything" (featuring Elohim) (2018)
