= Stiletto dance =

Dance performed in high heel shoes

Stiletto dance is a dance form that emerged and evolved in the United States and Europe in the late 20th and early 21st centuries. It is named after the stiletto heel women's shoe style, since one of its distinguishing features is the wearing of high-heel shoes during performance.

Stiletto dance is a solo dance genre often featured in routines seen in pop and hip-hop music videos. Its techniques and dance vocabulary derive from a wide range of dance styles used in music video-style choreographies. It is characterized by dynamic footwork based on jazz dance (See showgirl dance - the first style of technical dance to be performed in heels), ballroom dance, Latin dance and go-go dancing styles, torso isolations borrowed from belly dance and hip hop dance and floor work, fluid arm work and body language coming from exotic dancing and contemporary dance.

Stiletto dance is not a social dance style, it is seen mainly in the context of professional stage performance (cruise ship entertainment or backup dancers behind pop artists, professional dancers featured in music videos, or as a women's physical fitness movement discipline taught and practiced in workout or leisure format in dance studios or gyms.
