= EdIT =

American electronic music producer and DJ

edIT
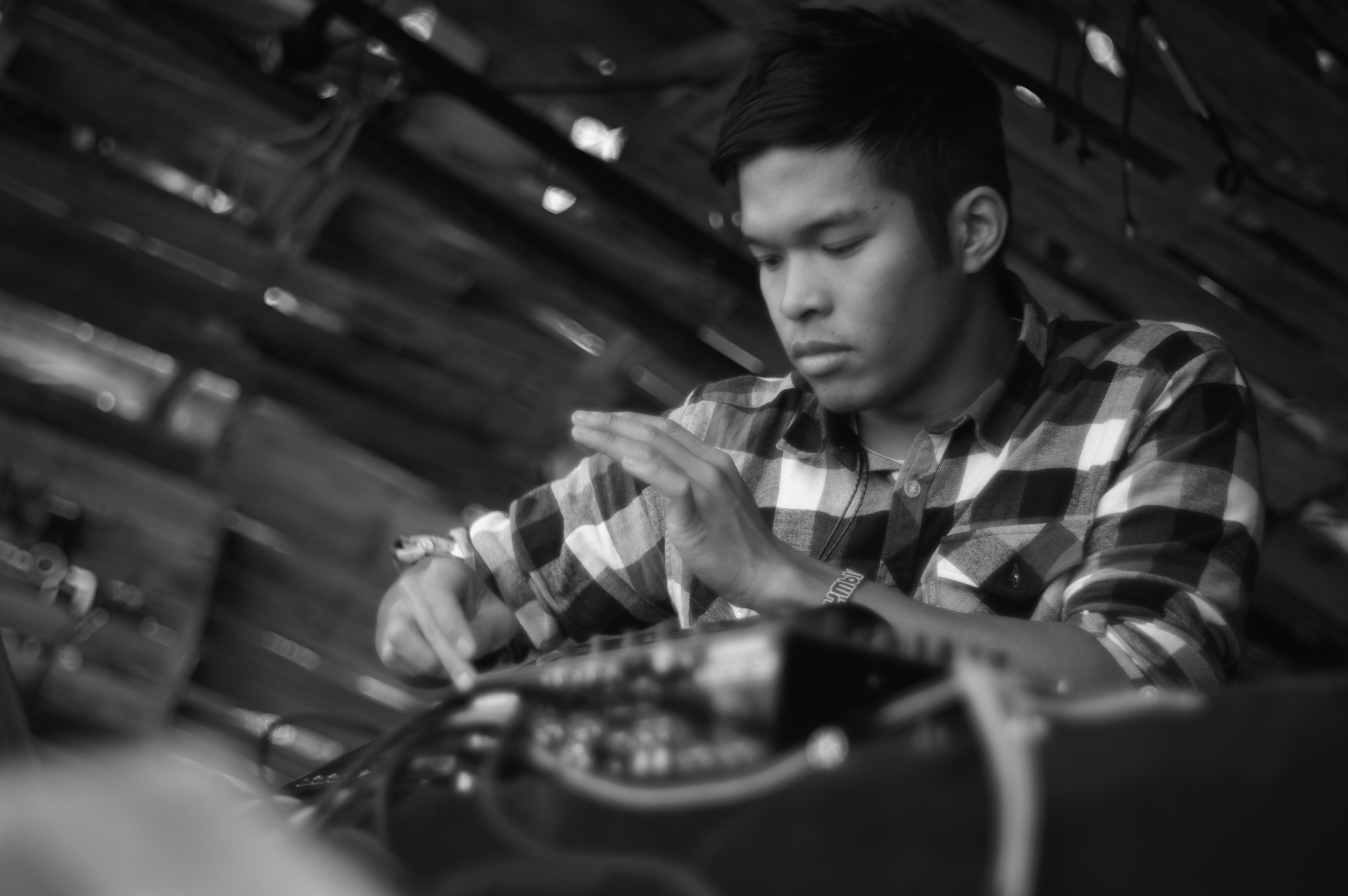
- edIT performing in 2009

Background information
- Also known as: The Con Artist
- Born: Edward Ma
- Origin: Los Angeles, California
- Genres: Electronic; glitch; IDM; glitch hop; experimental hip hop
- Occupations: Producer, DJ
- Instrument: Keyboards
- Years active: 1990s–present
- Labels: Planet Mu; Alpha Pup; Glass Air
- Member of: The Glitch Mob
- Website: editbeats.com

Edward Ma, known professionally as edIT, is an American electronic music producer and DJ based in Las Vegas. He is a member of the Glitch Mob.

== Impact ==
After growing up in Boston, Edward Ma began his career as a DJ and got into music production while he was studying at the University of Southern California. From there, he built his name in the Los Angeles underground and began his career in the late 1990s as The Con Artist. He was a resident DJ at Konkrete Jungle in Los Angeles and he hosted a Dublab radio show. He has produced tracks for underground hip hop artists such as Sole and Busdriver. He has also worked with P.E.A.C.E. and Myka 9 of Freestyle Fellowship, Daddy Kev, Hive, Dntel, Emanon and Phoenix Orion.

He is an old friend of Aloe Blacc and Daedelus and has contributed a remix of "Dumbfound" to Daedelus' single "Something Bells" in 2004.

His debut solo album, Crying Over Pros for No Reason, was released on Planet Mu in 2004.

Following the release of his debut, Ma continued to work at the fringes of hip hop and electronic music. In 2006, he co-founded The Glitch Mob with band members Josh Mayer (Ooah) and Justin Boreta (Boreta).

His second solo album, Certified Air Raid Material, was released on Alpha Pup Records in 2007. It features guest appearances from Abstract Rude, The Grouch, TTC, Busdriver and D-Styles.

Ten years after his debut solo album release, Crying Over Pros for No Reason (2004), edIT released Crying Over Pros for No Reason (Deluxe Edition) through The Glitch Mob's Glass Air Records imprint on December 9, 2014. The anniversary re-issue included five new tracks and was released in digital and vinyl formats. His works are also featuring in Season 2 of the TV series, Shadowhunters.

Although he has stated in 2015 that there will be no more solo projects as edIT, in 2021 he released a new solo album as edIT entitled "Come to Grips".

== Discography ==
=== Albums ===
- Crying Over Pros for No Reason (2004)
- Certified Air Raid Material (2007)
- Come To Grips (2021)

=== Singles ===
- "Battling Go-Go Yubari in Downtown L.A." b/w "Crunk De Gaulle" (2007)
- "The Game Is Not Over" b/w "More Lazers" (2008)

=== Productions ===
- Sole - "Uck rt" from Uck rt (2001)
- Busdriver - "Somethingness" from Temporary Forever (2002)
- Acid Reign - "Acid Hip-Hop" from Time & Change (2008)
- Travis Barker - "Cool Head" from Give The Drummer Some (2011)
