= Bellydance Superstars =

American bellydance troupe

- Origin: San Francisco, California, USA
- Website: Bellydance Superstars website (2018)

Bellydance Superstars is a professional American bellydance troupe formed in 2002 by producer and manager Miles Copeland. In its first six years of touring, it presented 700 shows in 22 countries. The troupe disbanded sometime in the mid-2000s after Copeland left to pursue other projects.

The line-up of performers became increasingly diverse throughout the years and the repertoire incorporated elements of many different dance styles including traditional Egyptian bellydance, Turkish bellydance, American Tribal Style and Tribal Fusion. The troupe toured extensively in North America, Europe, and Asia.

== Tours ==
The Bellydance Superstars, sometimes called BDSS, first toured in conjunction with the Lollapalooza 2003 music festival. Since then, the troupe has completed several full circuits of the world, infusing new cultural dance styles into the shows along the way.

"Bombay Bellywood" is their 75-stop tour that spanned the United States starting in October 2010. Several of the dancers learned some classical Indian dance for this trip.

== Critical reception ==
The Bellydance Superstars have been described as "poised to be the next Riverdance." An academic study also compares the two companies, discussing their transformation of dance tradition into stage spectacle.

== Media ==
In addition to live performances, the Bellydance Superstars company has produced instructional and performance DVDs with every level of learner in mind as well as a series of CDs featuring songs from their performances. Some of the dancers have created compilations of their personal favorites, such as Kami Liddle’s Tribal Beats for the Strange and Beautiful.

The company filmed a feature documentary called American Bellydancer. Several of the shows have been broadcast on national television in the USA, Latin America and Canada. The Bellydance Superstars Live in Paris show aired extensively on US public television station PBS.
