= Miles Copeland III =

American music and entertainment executive

- Born: Miles Axe Copeland III; May 2, 1944 (age 82); London, England
- Education: Birmingham–Southern College; American University of Beirut
- Occupations: Music and entertainment executive; band manager
- Parents: Miles Copeland Jr. (father); Lorraine Copeland (mother)
- Family: Ian Copeland (brother); Stewart Copeland (brother); William John Adie (grandfather)

Miles Axe Copeland III (born May 2, 1944) is an American music and entertainment executive and former manager of the Police. Copeland later managed Sting's musical and acting career. In 1979, Copeland founded the I.R.S. Records label, producing R.E.M., the Bangles, Berlin, the Cramps, Dead Kennedys, the Alarm, the Go-Go's, and others.

== Early life, family and education ==
Copeland was born in London, England, to Miles Axe Copeland Jr., a U.S. Central Intelligence Agency (CIA) officer from Birmingham, Alabama, US; and Lorraine Adie, a British archaeologist who worked in British intelligence. They had three sons: Ian, Miles, and Stewart, and a daughter, Leonora. The family lived in the Washington, D.C. area and throughout the Middle East, in particular Syria, Egypt, and Lebanon. At an early age, Copeland and his brothers learned and were fluent in Arabic.

Copeland attended Birmingham-Southern College in Birmingham, Alabama. He graduated with a degree in history and political science in 1962. He then attended American University in Washington, D.C. for a semester. From 1966 to 1969, Copeland attended the American University of Beirut, earning a master's degree in economics.

== Career ==
While attending school in Beirut to earn his economics degree, Copeland promoted his first concert. After college, he moved to London, met two progressive rock musicians at a club, and helped them form Wishbone Ash.

=== BTM and Illegal Records ===
In 1974, Copeland founded the management agency and record label BTM (British Talent Management) and signed a number of progressive rock acts such as Squeeze, Renaissance and Curved Air. In the summer of 1975, he organized a multi-band tour of European music festivals, named Startruckin' 75, which featured several BTM bands as well as Soft Machine, the Mahavishnu Orchestra and Lou Reed (replaced by Ike & Tina Turner). However, Reed's failure to appear at any of the shows and other logistical issues resulted in significant losses for Startruckin 75', and ultimately the failure of BTM. Copeland filed for bankruptcy and BTM closed down in 1976.

BTM's end coincided with the beginning of the UK's Punk/New Wave movement and led Copeland to co-found Illegal Records, Deptford Fun City Records, New Bristol Records, and to sign The Cortinas, Chelsea, and The Models to Step Forward Records in 1977. Copeland's office was the headquarters for Sniffin' Glue and Other Rock 'N' Roll Habits..., a monthly punk zine by Mark Perry.

=== The Police ===
In 1978, Copeland became manager of his brother Stewart's band, The Police. Copeland shepherded the group to become one of the biggest bands of the 1980s, peaking with a concert for 70,000 people at Shea Stadium and the number one single for 1983, "Every Breath You Take". He continued to manage Sting through seven solo albums. Copeland was not, however, included in the reunion era of the Police, leading to a 2007 interview in which Copeland lamented that money was the issue.

=== I.R.S. Records ===
The success of the Police and the novel methods used to popularize them enabled Copeland to found I.R.S. Records through a deal with A&M Records.

=== Copeland International Arts ===
Copeland owns and operates CIA (Copeland International Arts), which includes the Bellydance Superstars, Celtic Crossroads, Otros Aires, Zohar, and Beats Antique. Much of the CIA catalog initially included Middle Eastern, world music, Irish, tango, flamenco, and Polynesian styles. The label later signed mainstream artists.

== Personal life ==
Another of Copeland's brothers, Ian Copeland, was a booking agent, music promoter, and US Army veteran, who described much of the New Wave adventures of Miles, Stewart, and himself in his book Wild Thing: The Backstage, On the Road, In the Studio, Off the Charts Memoirs of Ian Copeland (1995, Simon & Schuster). The three brothers were honored with the 17th Annual Humanitarian Award from AMC Cancer Research Center on December 7, 1985, at “A Guerilla War on Cancer” dinner in New York City; they produced an album in support of the event.

In September 1989 Miles Copeland was involved (through Lol Creme) with a bizarre high-budget western called Gil Farrington On the Devil's Plain. The movie was written specifically for Sting and later investigated by Ridley Scott, but was never made.

== See also ==
- Bellydance Superstars
- Ark 21
