= American Tribal Style Belly Dance =

Improvised belly dance

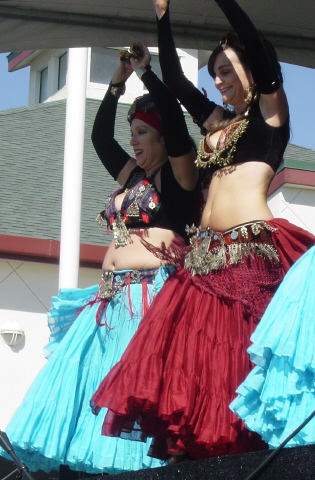
Tribal-style belly dancers in Pacifica, California (2004).

American Tribal Style Belly Dance or Tribal Style Belly Dance (also known as ATS or Tribal) is a modern style of belly dance created by FatChanceBellyDance director, Carolena Nericcio. American Tribal Style Belly Dance is clearly defined and documented with the primary characteristic being that of group improvisation. Tribal is generally performed in a group, often at community events such as festivals and parades, with tribal dancers typically favoring a look provided by wide-legged pants gathered at the ankles (aka pantaloons), tops known as cholis and full skirts.

There are several American Tribal Style Belly Dance troupes in the United States and throughout the world. FatChanceBellyDance is one of the largest ATS dance troupe companies, providing lessons, videos, music, costumes and more. The company was formed in 1987 by Carolena Nericcio. Their website provides another perspective on the history of American Tribal Style.

== Tribal style ==
The general category Tribal Style is accredited to Jamila Salimpour who fostered a fusion of costumes and folkloric dances styles from the Banjara gypsies of Rajasthan and began teaching what she knew and performing all over California and the West Coast. Using traditional folkloric dance elements and costumes inspired by traditional and ethnographic traditions, she presented on stage through Bal Anat a colorful dance company which included musicians, singers and dancers to create a "souk" or almost circus feel. Taking what she herself had learned from native dancers from Morocco, Algeria, Turkey, Egypt, Syria and Lebanon who were dancing in the United States, she began to catalogue "belly dance movement" and began creating a basic repertoire terminology which is still the basis for Tribal Style and American Tribal Style repertoire.

Tribal Style today represents everything from Folkloric inspired dances to a fusion of ancient dance techniques from North India, the Middle East, Spain and Africa. As a general category, Tribal Style covers many flavors of American Belly Dance both the folkloric inspired like Dalia Carella and fusion and cross over styles which explore modern, jazz, dance theatre, and hip hop with belly dance, as well as fusion with traditional classical ethnic dance forms like Bhangra, Bharata Natyam, Flamenco and now even Polynesian and West African Dance.

According to Moria Chappell, a well-known Tribal dancer, Tribal differs from ballet, jazz and modern in its extreme emphasis of core muscle isolation (especially in the abdomen, pelvic girdle, and thoracic spine) and lack of hard impact moves. Because of the greater emphasis on muscular isolation than skeletal virtuosity, Tribal dance is accessible to people with a wider range of body types, ages, and health problems than many classic theater dance arts.

== Improvisational choreography ==
American Tribal Style belly dance's movements are inspired by folkloric dances of the Middle East, North Africa, Spain and India. ATS is a method of improvisational choreography, using a vocabulary of movements and cues allowing the dancers to communicate while dancing. The standardized vocabulary and cueing system allows dancers who have learned ATS to improvise together without having rehearsed a fixed choreography.Though it is a modern dance, the feeling is ancient and connected, with its vibrant costuming, music, use of zils (finger cymbals), movements and interaction between the tribe of dancers.

American Tribal Style belly dance commonly incorporates finger cymbals, or zils, while emphasizing group improvisation and interaction rather than solo performance.

There are two families of movements: slow movements and fast movements.

- Zils are worn but not usually played while performing "slow movements." (However, for example, if the featured duet trio or quartet are dancing to a Moroccan 6 rhythm, members of the chorus may choose to accompany them through playing their zils.)
- During "fast movements" the zils are meant to be played. The most common rhythm played on the dancer's zils is the right-left-right pattern. Certain "fast" movements require the dancers and chorus to play the military zil pattern. The “military” zil pattern, is also known as the 3-3-7 pattern. Its name is of uncertain origin; one proposed explanation is its resemblance to rhythms played by military marching bands. Other, less frequently played patterns, include the Moroccan 6; some troupes experiment with 9/8 Turkish rhythm.

American Tribal Style features call-and-answer performance with other dancers or as a whole group as well as, more uncommonly, solos. Often there is a chorus that provides a moving back-drop while the featured duet, trio, or quartet is the focal point. Dancers take turns coming out of the chorus in duets, trios and quartets because if, for example, five dancers were to come out into formation, the sight-line (view of the leader) is not as effective. Groups of 5 or more are generally used towards specific formations to improve this site-line issue.

The principle dancers and the chorus work in an improvisational manner. Formations for the principle dancers and the chorus is also formalized in the ATS format to maximize dancer visibility to the audience and likewise maximize group visibility of the leader. The leader is always farthest to the left, followers to the right. Dancers angle their bodies to the left to be able to clearly read the leader's cues. The same rule applies for members of the chorus. When the dancers face each other in a circle, the lead is neutral. The next movement can be proposed by any dancer in the circle.

The cues and formations are the secret behind group improvisational dance. They allow the dancers to move together without choreography. Sometimes, troupes will create formal choreography while still using the ATS specific formations and cues.

== Costuming ==
The style is also characterized by costumes derived from many "folkloric" and various traditional tribal costuming resources and is often composed of layers of large tiered skirts or 10–25 meter/yard skirts, a short choli often with a plunging neckline, over which a bra decorated with coins and textiles sits, a headdress or hair decorations, one or more hip scarves with yarn, tassels or fringe, and a heavy layering of oxidized silver jewelry. Camel tassels/ornamented camel ropes are a specifically U.S. Tribal/ATS-era costume innovation, inspired by Bedouin/nomadic camel saddle ornaments.

The jewelry commonly originates from Central Asia, from any number of nomadic tribes or empires (e.g., Kuchi, Turkoman, Rajasthan) and is often large and set with semi-precious stones or, when mass-produced, with glass.

I can only speak for my troupe in terms of the evolution of costuming style. My teacher, Masha, encouraged us to wear a choli and pantaloons, a fringe shawl, lots of big chunky jewelry and a headdress or some sort of embellished hair worn up. The coin bra was optional. When FCBD first started we used that format, but the dancers started finding other pieces, like the full skirts and tassel belts. It was a bit of a mish-mash at first, but we eventually standardized our look to be choli, bra, pantaloons, skirt, shawl and/or tassel belt, headdress mandatory and of course lots of jewelry.

— Carolena Nericcio

Dancers frequently "tattoo" their faces with kohl or kajal. Make-up is usually eye focused with heavy use of kajal.
