= Dirty Martini (burlesque) =

American burlesque dancer and model

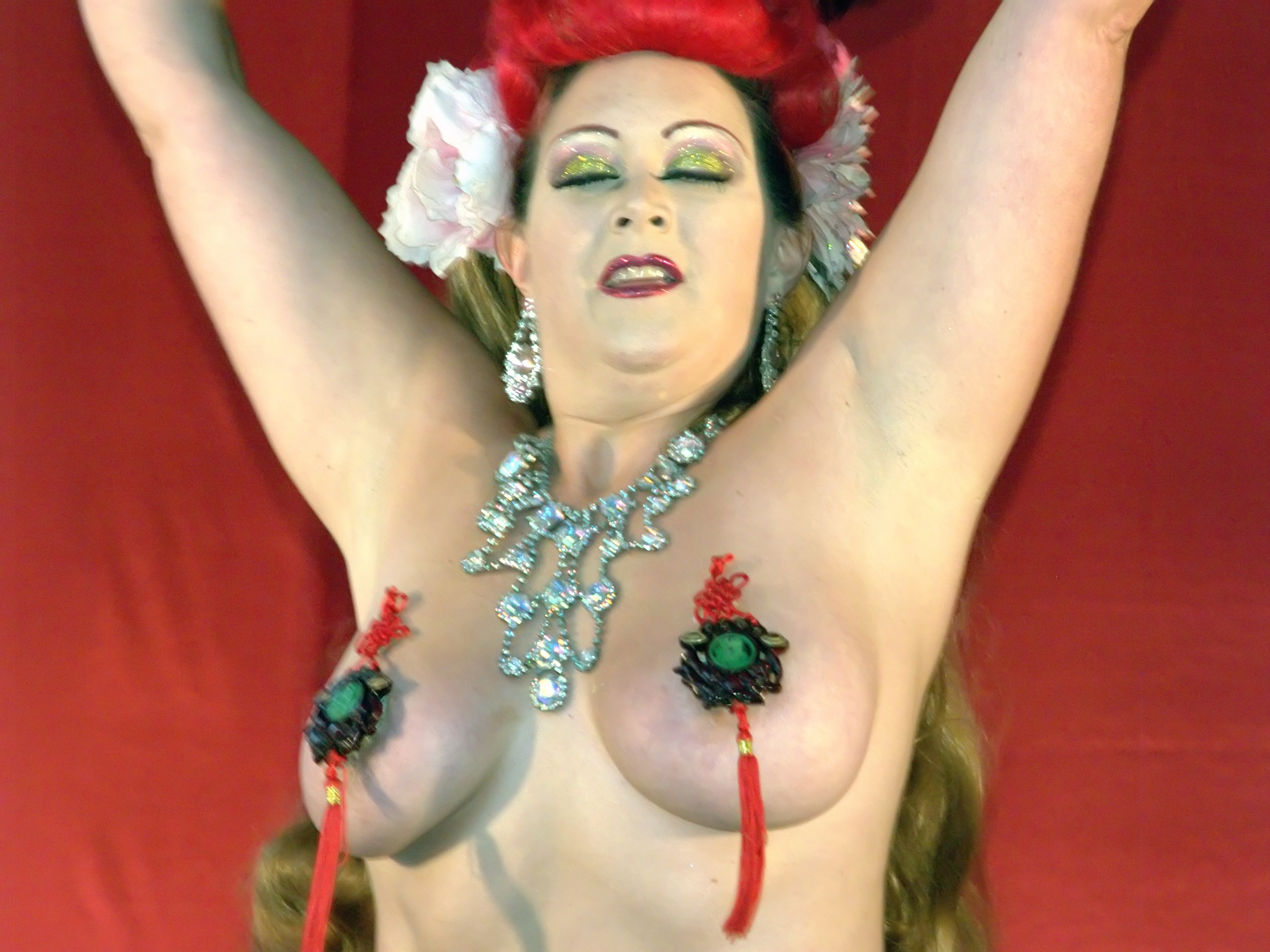
- Dirty Martini in 2009
- Born: Linda Marraccini; New Jersey, United States
- Occupations: Burlesque dancer, pin-up model, dance teacher
- Website: missdirtymartini.com

Dirty Martini (born Linda Marraccini) is an American burlesque dancer, pin-up model and dance teacher.

She is best known for her over-the-top performance acts, which mostly incorporate various classic burlesque styles such as the fan dance, balloon striptease, and shadow stripping.

Martini lives and performs in New York City, but tours extensively throughout North America and Europe. She has performed on stages that range from weekly burlesque venues, gay leather bars, the London Palladium and Carnegie Hall.

In 2004, Dirty Martini was crowned Miss Exotic World.

== Biography ==
Born to an opera singer/visual artist mother and a band director father, she was raised in New Jersey, where she studied dance since the age of six. Martini later honed her choreography skills at SUNY-Purchase, where she graduated with a BFA in Dance Performance.

=== Performance ===
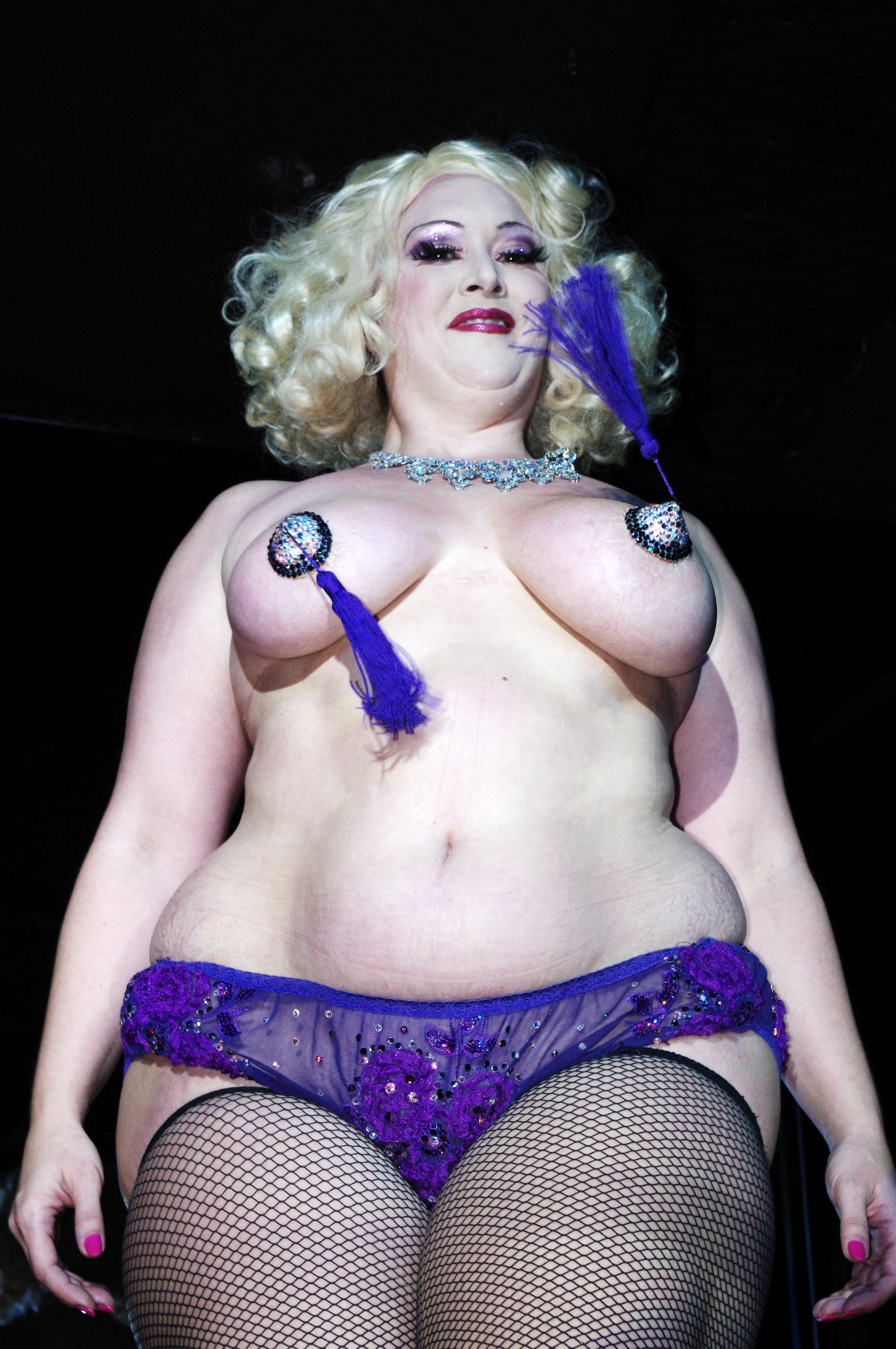
Martini performing at the Copacabana for the launch of Michael Musto's new book in 2011

Martini moved to New York City and started out working in collaborative theater and modern dance groups. She viewed some old burlesque reels when she was searching for a style that was conducive to performing solo and showcasing her voluptuous figure, and started developing and performing a fan dancing act. Among Martini's notable acts are her homage to Mae West, Jennie Lee, Zorita and Sally Rand.

In May 2001, Martini performed in the first new burlesque convention, "Tease-o-rama", in New Orleans. Later that year, at the Miss Exotic World 2001, she won the Sally Rand Award for Fan Dance. In 2004, she was awarded the main title and the Jennie Lee award for tassel twirling at Miss Exotic World.

Martini has worked with comedian and drag king personality Murray Hill, playwright/performer Taylor Mac in Red Tide Blooming, fellow burlesque performer Julie Atlas Muz, and Penny Arcade in Bad Reputation and New York Values. She also performed in Margaret Cho's 2007 burlesque-style variety show, The Sensuous Woman.

On December 6, 2017, Dirty Martini opened at the off-Broadway Playhouse Theater of the Henry Street Settlement in Jack and the Beanstalk, the first large-scale pantomime to be presented in New York for over a century. Adapted from the fairy tale of the same title by Mat Fraser and directed by Julie Atlas Muz, the production also starred David Ilku, Michael Johnnie Lynch, Matt Roper, and a cast of downtown performers. Awarded the New York Times' Critic's Pick, the production closed on December 23, 2017 and enjoyed a revival the following year at the same theater, running for three weeks during the 2018 holiday season. Martini played the role of the Good Fairy.

She has toured theaters and opera houses across the world with Dita Von Teese.

=== TV and film appearances ===
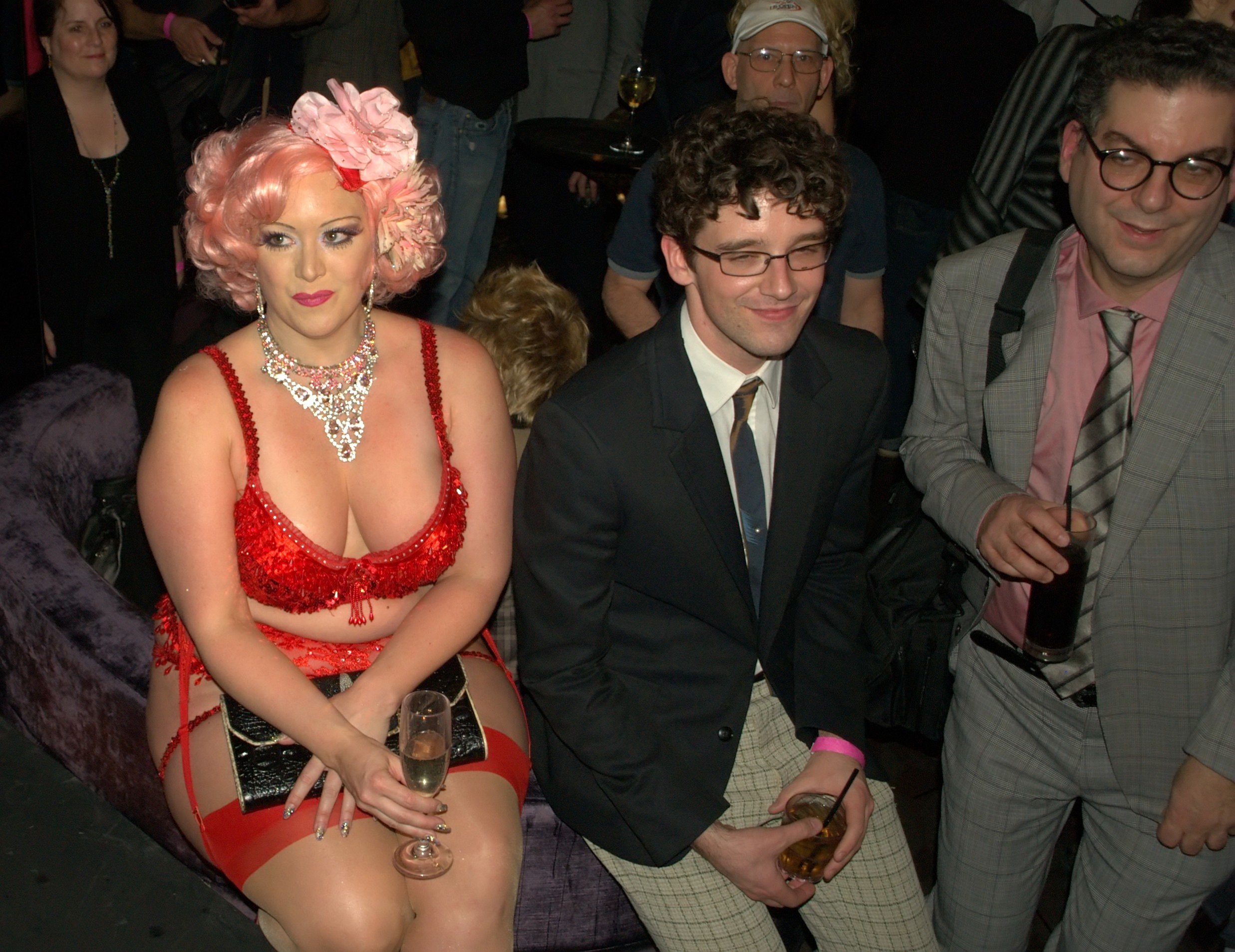
Martini, Michael Urie and Michael Musto at a party in New York in 2010

She has appeared on the AMC TV series, Into Character, in the 2004 documentary The Velvet Hammer Burlesque, in John Cameron Mitchell's 2006 film Shortbus, and in Mitchell's video for "Filthy/Gorgeous" by the Scissor Sisters.

She has been the featured subject in two documentaries. One is the 2009 short film Dirty Martini by Iban Del Campo, which won the best documentary film award at the 2010 FreeNetWorld International Film Fest held in Serbia. The other is the 2010 feature length Dirty Martini and the New Burlesque by Gary Beeber, which is about Martini and her colleagues in the Neo-Burlesque scene.

Martini also appears in the Burlesque Undressed documentary with Immodesty Blaize, Catherine D'lish, Satan's Angel, and Michelle L'amour, and in Exotic World & the Burlesque Revival, which focuses on the history of Dixie Evans' Burlesque Hall of Fame Museum (formerly The Exotic World Museum).

Martini, alongside burlesque performers including Mimi Le Meaux, Kitten on the Keys, Julie Atlas Muz, Evie Lovelle and Roky Roulette, were featured in Mathieu Amalric's 2010 Cannes-award winning film, Tournee. A drawing of her is used for the film's promotional poster.

=== Print media ===
Martini has been featured in the books Striptease: from Gaslight to Spotlight by Jessica Glasscock, Burlesque and the New Bump-n-Grind by Michelle Baldwin, and Katherina Bosse's New Burlesque. Martini is also featured in Neo-Burlesque: Striptease As Transformation by Lynn Sally, released in October 2021.

For the spring 2010 edition of V Magazine, she was featured in a fashion spread shot by Karl Lagerfeld at the House of Chanel.
