= Millie Dollar =

English cabaret performer

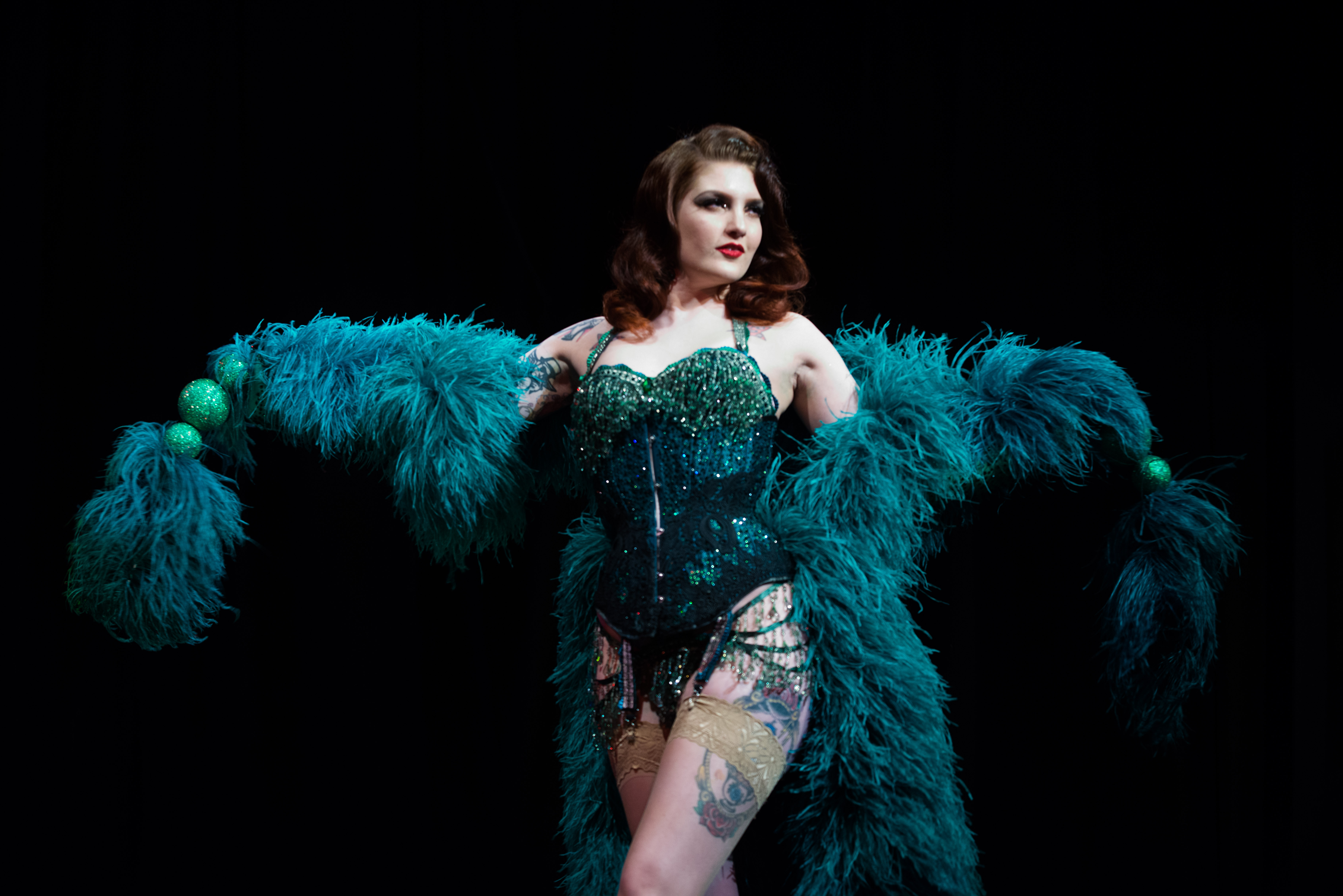
Millie Dollar at Hebden Bridge Burlesque Festival 2016

Millie Dollar (born 1985) is a cabaret performer who was born in Toxteth, Liverpool.

The character of Millie Dollar was created in 2005, and took to the stage in 2006, starting out in Korova Bar in Liverpool where she gained immediate residency.

Millie created the Martini Lounge, a Liverpool-based burlesque and variety show in 2007, which ran first at the Royal Court Theatre, Liverpool, before moving into St George's Hall, Liverpool, and the Epstein Theatre.

== History ==
Millie Dollar stepped onstage for the first time at Strip Club, a monthly night at Korova Bar in Liverpool, just as burlesque was starting to become known in the UK. She went on to perform here until its end in 2008. She also became a regular at The Go-Go Cage at The Magnet Liverpool, and returned to this stage in 2016 for its tenth birthday.

By 2008 Millie was travelling overseas to perform, becoming a regular act in Paris, Milan and Geneva. She also joined the cast of The Leg Show at Ink and Iron in Los Angeles.

After her time in Los Angeles she reworked her performance style, bringing back bump and grind and adding a new level of raunchiness to her stage acts.

In 2014 she also added fire performing, and whip cracking skills into her repertoire as her career progresses.

She is well known for being a performer with hearing loss, wearing hearing aids on and offstage since 2015, as a child Millie had three operations to gain her hearing, one in the UK, and two in Australia.

In 2019 Millie was the first performer to perform burlesque in the country of Nepal, at CREA's ReConference in Kathmandu.

== Producing ==
Millie Dollar started producing in 2006 with a weekly burlesque show at Heebie Jeebies Liverpool called The Girl Can't Help It which hosted many up and coming acts of the time such as Diva Hollywood and Anna Fur Laxis.

In 2007 she created a bi-monthly Burlesque and Variety show called The Martini Lounge. starting out in The Royal Court downstairs bar that was also used for Rawhide comedy club. This ran there until 2010, when the show moved into the Concert Room of St George's Hall, Liverpool. The first show there featured Missy Malone, Dirty Martini (burlesque), Kitten Deville among its star-studded cast.

It ran from then up until 2015 alternating with the Epstein Theatre, before taking a hiatus. There have been one-off events produced by the Martini Lounge for Liverpool Pride, DaDaFest, amongst various others.

Millie ran a monthly burlesque night at Blind Tiger Liverpool on the last Friday of every month for almost two years, and now runs The Martini Lounge back in The Royal Court Theatre.
