= Gary Beeber =

American photographer and filmmaker

GARY BEEBER
- Occupation: Photographer
- Notable work: Dirty Martini and the New Burlesque (Feature Film)

Gary Beeber (born 1951) is an American photographer and filmmaker.

== Early life and education ==
Gary Beeber grew up in suburban Ohio. When he was 12 years-old, he parents bought him his first camera. He attended Miami University's College of Art, where he "focused on learning drawing and painting technique; egg tempera, watercolor, oil," graduating in 1971. Next, he moved to New York City, where he studied at the School of Visual Arts and took courses with R. O. Blechman and Charlie Slackman. In New York City, he worked as an exhibit designer at The Museum of Modern Art, the Whitney Museum and other galleries and exhibition spaces. In the early 1990s, moved to Southampton (village), New York, where he met the photographer Jay Hoops. After Hoops' death in 2004, he obtained a collection of her Polaroids from her estate, which formed the subject of an exhibition that he co-curated at the Galleries at Wright State University in 2022. In 2017, he moved from Long Island to southern Ohio.

== Career ==
Beeber began his professional career in photorealistic watercolors, mostly using his camera to make reference photographs of subjects. He eventually abandoned painting altogether for photography. He has taken photographs in Italy, Morocco, German, and the United States, with subjects ranging from somber spaces of death, through deteriorating objects, architectural details, plants, portraits, and rituals, to the exuberant figures of neo-burlesque.

Beeber filmed and produced the 2010 feature-length documentary Dirty Martini and the New Burlesque, which won the Best Documentary Feature Award at the 2010 Coney Island Film Festival and was an Official Selection of the 2010 USA Film Festival. From 2011 to 2014, he produced a neo-burlesque show, Gotham Burlesque, on the Upper West Side.

== Works (selection) ==
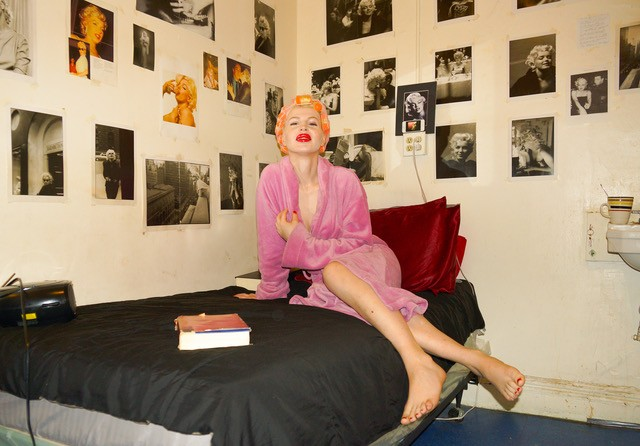
"Mona posing in her little room, NYC” from the “Mona” series (Gary Beeber)

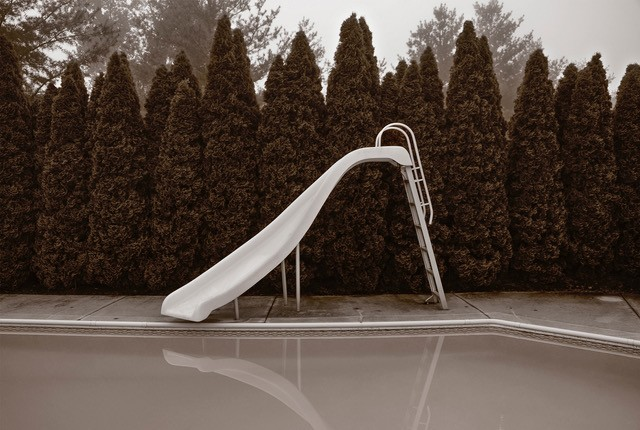
“Suburbia” from the “Slideshow” series (Gary Beeber)

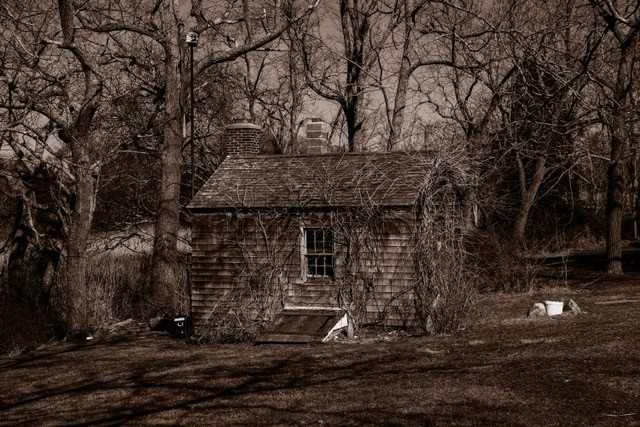
“Shed, Sylvester Manor” from the "Sylvester Manor" series (Gary Beeber)

Beeber has had many solo photography and juried exhibitions and a number of large companies, including Pfizer Pharmaceutical, Goldman Sachs, and Chase Bank have purchased his work. His work is held in permanent collections in Tennessee, Ohio, Massachusetts, Florida, and New York.

=== Documentary film ===
- WATER (Feature Film)
- us Chickens
- EMILY'S DO
- Michael Malone, Portrait of an American Organic Farmer (Short film)
- The Savior of Coney Island (Short film)
- Dirty Martini and the New Burlesque (Feature Film)
- Mister D
- Ballymaster
- Insectavora

=== Solo photography exhibitions ===
- 2024: “Who the ... is Michael Malone” FotoFocus
- 2022: Personalities, Praxis Photo Arts Center, Minneapolis, MN,
- 2022: Gary Beeber, Artist and Collector, Robert & Elaine Stein Galleries, Wright State University, Dayton, OH
- 2022: The Relevant and the Absurd, Museum Mile Contemporary
- 2020: Sylvester Manor, Griffin Museum of Photography, Winchester, MA, (Yorgos Efthymiadis)
- 2018: Ladies & Gentlemen, A Smith Gallery, Johnson City, TX, (Amanda Smith and Kevin Tully)
- 2017: Personalities, Griffin Museum of Photography (Paula Tognarelli)
- 2017: Personalities, RICPA, Providence, RI (Paula Tognarelli)
- 2015: Beauty is in the Details, Dodds & Eder, Sag Harbor, NY
- 2005: Happy Ride, Coney Island, Coney Island Museum, Brooklyn
- 2004: Happy Ride, Coney Island, Lyceum Gallery, Suffolk Community College, Long Island, NY
- 2002: Details of Sight, Egizio's Project, New York City (Egizio)
- 2002: Photographs from Cemeteries of the Saints, Morocco, NYC Center for Jewish History
- 2002: Dachau, Photographs of the Concentration Camp, ALP Galleries, New York City
- 2001: Immortal Reflection, Recent Photographs by Gary Beeber, Generous Miracles Gallery, NYC
- 1998: Time Passages, Generous Miracles Gallery, NYC
