= Fan dance =

Type of dance including fans

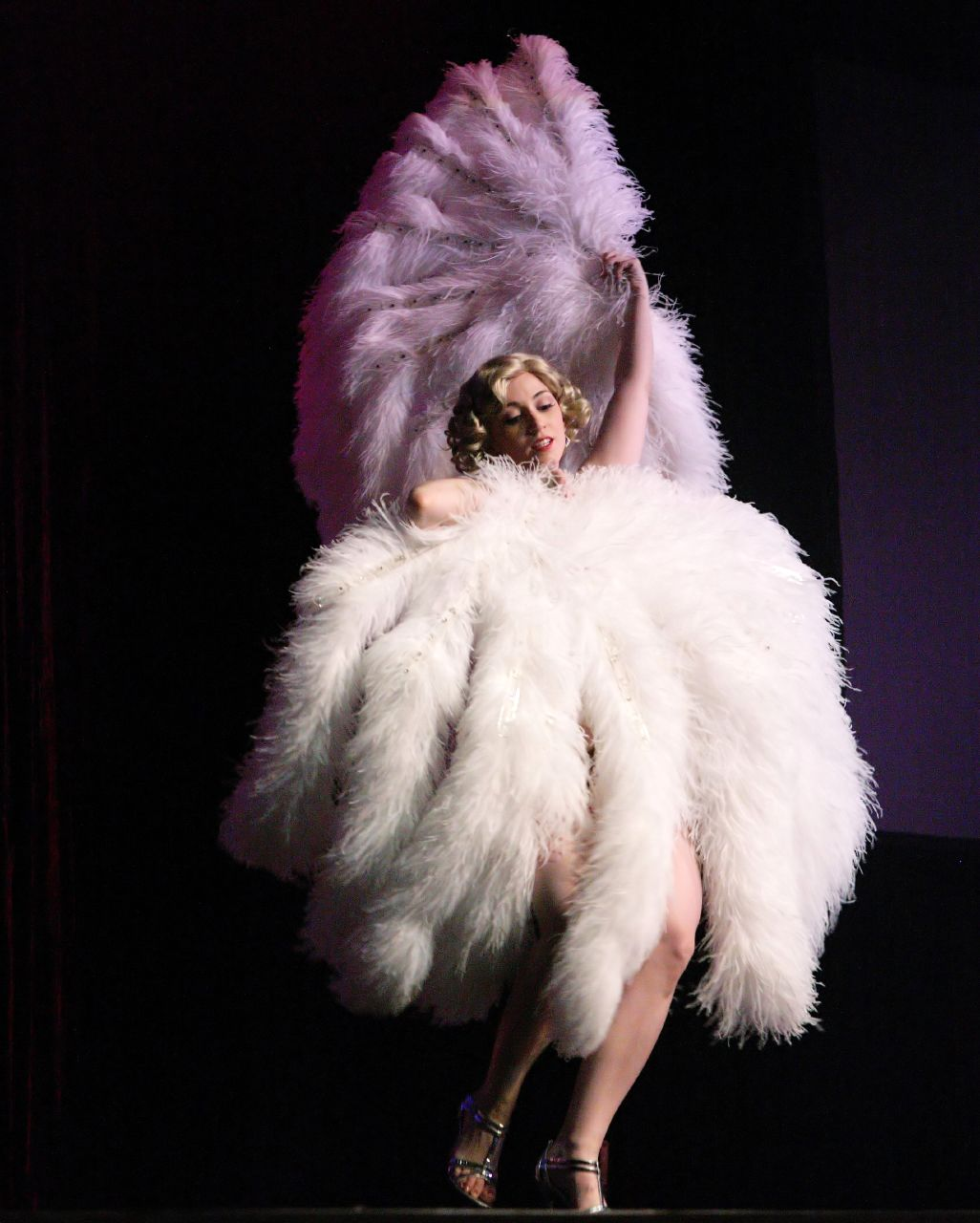
Michelle L'amour at the Miss Exotic World Pageant, 2007. Photo Michael Albov

In the West, a fan dance (i.e., a dance performed with fans) may be an erotic dance performance, traditionally by a woman, but not exclusively. Beyond eroticism it is a form of musical interpretation. The performer, sometimes entirely nude or apparently so, dances while manipulating two or more large fans that can be constructed from many different materials including ostrich feathers, silks, velvet, sequined and organza fabrics. The unifying factor in all is the spins, or fan staves, that give form to this prop.

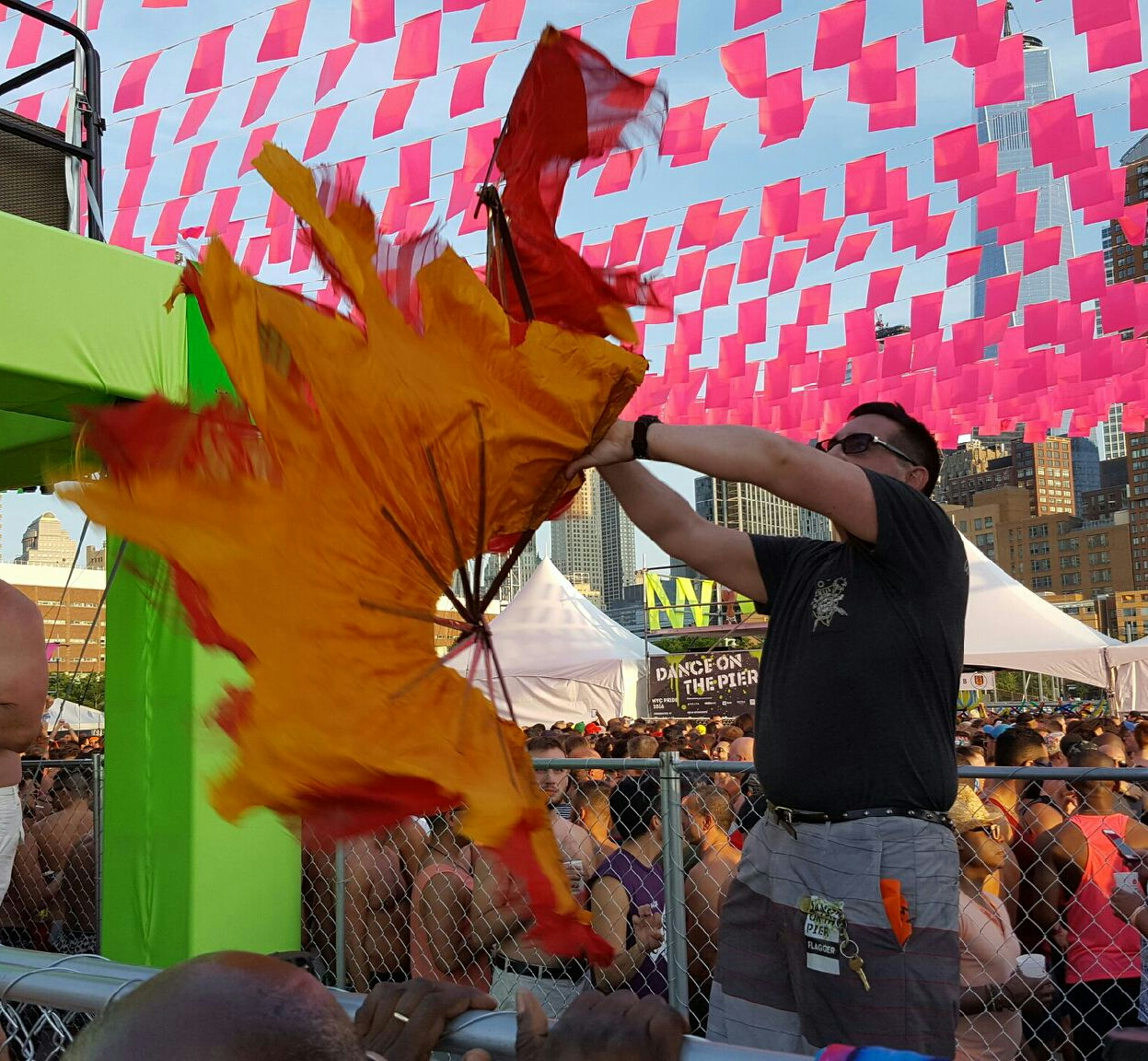
Fan Dancer known to exhibit his own handcrafted toys on Dance on the Pier stages since 1991 is seen here taking another spin in 2016.

In the 1970s gay men removed the solid pin at the center of the fan and replaced it with knotted string allowing for a fluid curvaceous movement. This disco art has been seen in San Francisco's Trocadero (perhaps first before the East's Paradise Garage), New York's Roseland Ballroom plus numerous circuit parties from Corbett Reynolds 1996 "Jungle Red" Party in Cleveland to the White and Winter Parties of Miami and London's 1998 Red Heart's Ball. More difficult to construct (and manipulate) than the flags commonly used today, there are but a handful of artists, male and female, who occasionally exhibit this style of dance. The 1997 and 2016 Dance on the Pier images both give a closer look at a pair of medium-sized fans caught in fast motion. At times these fans travel in a simple elliptical pattern seen as a circle by the audience while further into the choreography one might see a perfect windmill, helicopter blades, a set of wings or even Carmen's skirt. Hiding the body to evade morality codes does not factor into this reinterpretation on what a fan dance might be, but they do stand as another symbolic protest to the fact that homosexuals were not permitted to dance together in public or private spaces in New York City for decades.

Out of the Darkness, an annual AIDS remembrance event every December 1st hosted by AREA, GMHC and Heritage of Pride, sponsored by the Keith Haring Foundation, has included such a tribe of fan and flag dancers as opening and closing performers for the evenings ceremonies many times noting in their program that these are ritual dances done upon a person's death. It is also a dance seen at a child's first birthday celebration of life where people remember all the children who did not survive those early months as bodies adjust to living outside the womb.

In the UK, the fan dance has also been used in the finals of the Miss Nude UK 2000 competition and for The Windmill in Soho where it replaced the tradition of nude tableaux which has since been replaced by table dancing.

In 1998 Thelma Houston had 40 fan and flag dancers accompany her off the gangplank of the Queen of Hearts paddle wheel boat onto the stage at Chelsea Piers for the Dance on Manhattan fundraiser. Gloria Gaynor did similar the year prior with 16 men. Loleatta Holloway danced with just one man at the third of these annuals.

== In popular culture ==
The 1963 film Gypsy is a musical about Gypsy Rose Lee, a noted fan dancer.

== See also ==
- Faith Bacon, who performed fan dances in the 1920s
- Sally Rand, who popularized fan dance in the 1930s
- Michelle L'amour
- Flagging dance
- Buchaechum
