= Dirty Martini =

Dirty Martini may refer to:

- Dirty Martini (band), an indie-pop band from Portland, Oregon
- Dirty Martini (burlesque), New York City-based burlesque dancer
- A type of Martini (cocktail)
