= Immodesty Blaize =

British dancer

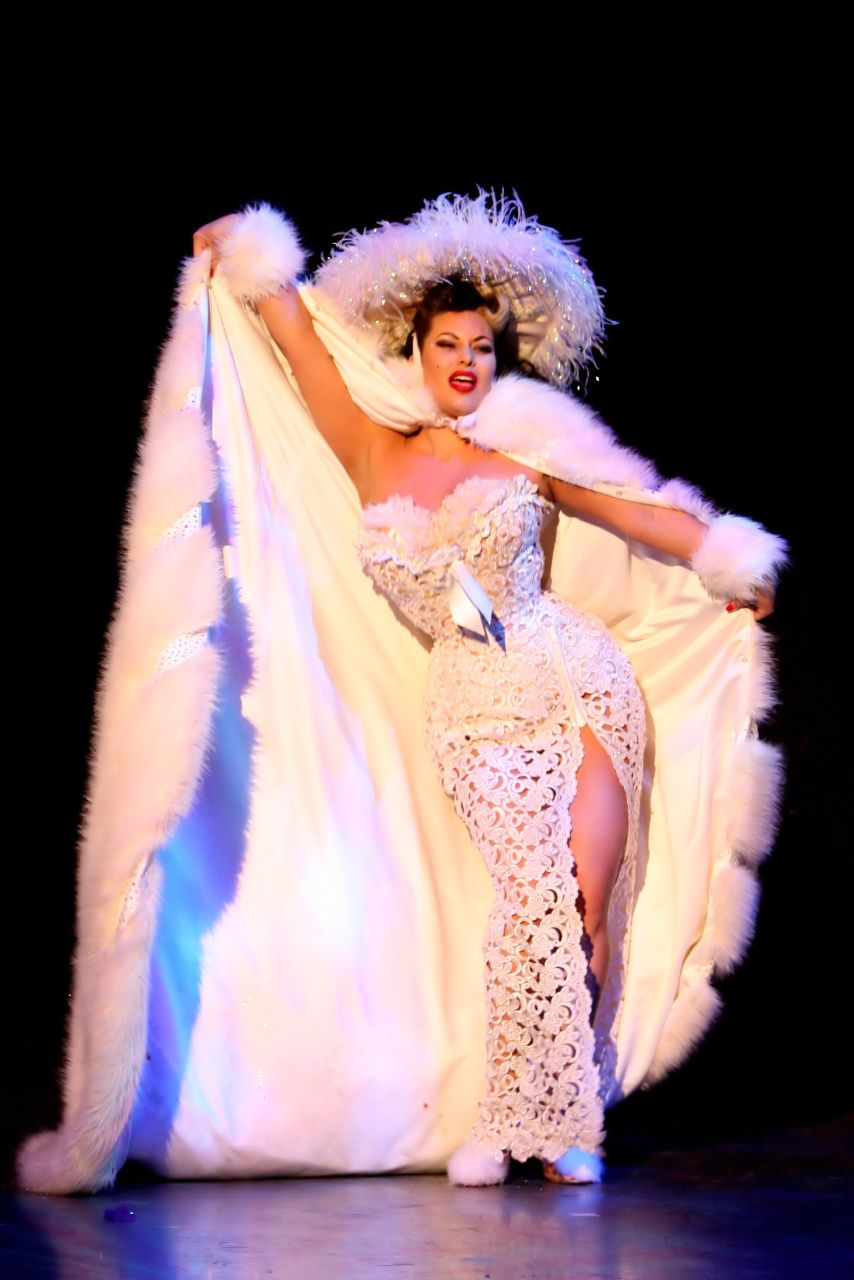
- Performing at the 2007 Burlesque Hall of Fame pageant which she won.
- Born: Hitchin, Hertfordshire, England
- Occupations: Burlesque performer and novelist
- Website: http://www.immodestyblaize.com/

Immodesty Blaize (born Kelly Fletcher in Hitchin, Hertfordshire) is an English burlesque dancer who performs internationally. She was crowned Reigning Queen of Burlesque in June 2007 at the Las Vegas Burlesque Hall of Fame formerly known as Exotic World.

Her stage name is an allusion to the character Modesty Blaise.

== Rise to fame ==
Immodesty has been performing burlesque internationally since 1999. Originally, she performed in addition to her film day job. She worked in film, first as a storyboard artist, then progressing to producing and eventually getting her break directing. She won an EVCOM award for directing 10 short films for the Nobel Prizes sponsored by CNN and Cisco Systems. By night she moonlighted, performing burlesque striptease, until she chose to perform and produce shows full-time. Immodesty has been widely credited as trailblazing the burlesque renaissance in Europe. Immodesty brought a mainstream profile to the genre in Britain, bringing the genre into mainstream press, and onto Prime Time TV. as well as bringing burlesque out of clubs and back into West End theatre with a continual nightly run that was extended to 5 months. She also wrote two books published by Ebury and produced a docu-film Burlesque Undressed that premiered in cinemas in 30 countries and became one of Sky Arts top rating documentaries for 8 years.

== Showgirl and writer ==
Immodesty performs her live shows in theatrical venues globally such as London Royal Opera House, Orpheum Theatre Los Angeles, Wintergarden Berlin, various Las Vegas Casinos, and Sydney State Theatre. She performed for Cher and Christina Aguilera at the premier of the Sony Pictures Burlesque movie, and she has performed in shows with artistes such as Marc Almond, the late James Brown, Roxy Music, Goldfrapp, Scissor Sisters, Barry Adamson, and Nick Cave. In 2009 Immodesty signed to EMI She produced the feature-length documentary Burlesque Undressed which screened in cinemas in over 30 countries. She competed at and was crowned 'Reigning Queen of Burlesque' (to date, the only British performer ever) in Las Vegas 2007 at the Burlesque Hall of Fame.

Immodesty spent two decades working to establish burlesque as a legitimate form of mainstream theatre. She was the first performer to present a full showgirl style striptease on prime TV in the UK on ITV1 the Paul O'Grady Show and later on, Italy's Dancing with the Stars (Ballando Con Le Stelle) on RAI1 . Immodesty is best known for her signature act with an enormous rocking horse but has many other shows including with her giant telephone, a crystal bubble bath, and her signature oversized powder puffs.

Immodesty is known as a public speaker away from the burlesque stage and in 2008 she was the first showgirl to be invited to debate at "the world's most prestigious debating society" the Oxford Union, which she took part in alongside US Congressman Bob Barr and Lord McNally. She's spoken extensively on radio and television as a pundit e.g. Woman's Hour and BBC World Service, various TV shows, and at places such as National Film Theatre, and Hay Literary Festival. She also outsold Archbishop Desmond Tutu's presentation at Hay Literary Festival. Immodesty also follows in a tradition set by Gypsy Rose Lee and has written two novels set in the modern showgirl world, which are published by Ebury, Ambition and Tease. Immodesty lives in Monaco.

== Publications ==
Immodesty has written two novels.

- Blaize, Immodesty (May 2009). Tease: the Secrets of a Showgirl. London: Ebury Press. ISBN 978-0-09-193001-1.
- Blaize, Immodesty (June 2010). Ambition. London: Ebury Press. ISBN 978-0-09-193004-2.
