= Zorita (burlesque dancer) =

American burlesque dancer (1915–2001)

- Born: Kathryn Boyd; 30 August 1915; Youngstown, Ohio, U.S.
- Died: 12 November 2001 (aged 86); Stuart, Florida, U.S.
- Occupations: Burlesque dancer, entertainer, actress
- Years active: 1935–1974

Zorita (born Kathryn Boyd, 30 August 1915 – 12 November 2001) was an American burlesque dancer. She was best known for a twenty-minute dance which she performed with two boa constrictors called 'Elmer and Oscar'.

== Early life ==
Zorita was born Kathryn Boyd in Youngstown, Ohio, in 1915 and was adopted by a strict Methodist couple in Chicago. When she was 15, she worked as a manicurist. Following a client's suggestion because of her full and mature figure, she worked as a stripper at stag parties to earn extra money.

When she was 17, she moved to San Diego to work in the Zoro Garden Nudist Colony at the California Pacific International Exposition. There, she formed a friendship with a snake charmer who gave her the two snakes that became part of her act. After being discovered through a beauty pageant, she began working as a burlesque artist in 1935.

== Career ==
Zorita became well known for her unique and controversial numbers, such as the "Half and Half". She dressed one half of her body as a groom and the other as a bride, and, keeping one side to the audience, simulated the undressing of each half, leading to the "wedding night romp". In another, an unseen "spider" removed her clothes whilst she danced in front of a rhinestone-covered spiderweb. However, her most iconic acts involved boa constrictors. One example, titled "The Consummation of the Wedding of the Snake", featured her stripping while holding an 8-foot boa constrictor. She described it as: "A gorgeous young maiden is going to be sold into slavery to an ugly old man. Instead, she dances with a snake, gets bitten, and dies."

In another act, she emerged from a giant spiderweb dripping in rhinestones. Dark "spider's hands" slowly peeled off her clothes from the rear.

On 15 August 1941, Zorita was arrested for indecent exposure at the Kentucky Club in Toledo, Ohio. She was found guilty by a jury and sentenced to 6 months imprisonment.

In 1941, Zorita was charged with animal cruelty for her use of snakes in the act – she was also known to walk her snakes on leashes in public. She was released on a $1,500 bail, but after her last New York performance, all of her snakes were confiscated.

The name "Zorita" was given to her by a Mr. Miller, who owned the San Francisco theatre where she was performing. "Zorita", a song about her, was recorded by the Fields-Madera Orchestra in 1959. The song was written by Sol Marcus and Bennie Benjamin.

She retired from stripping in 1954 and ran several burlesque clubs in New York and Miami before retiring completely in 1974 to breed Persian cats.

== Personal life ==
Zorita was bisexual. When she was touring venues, her "girl friend" accompanied her. She was first married at 15 and divorced three times. She later said that she stripped for men, but preferred women.

She died on 12 November 2001, aged 86.

== Filmography ==
- I Married a Savage (1949)
- Naughty New York (1959)
- Judy's Little No-No (1969)
- Revenge Is My Destiny (1971)
- Lenny (1974) (uncredited)
