= Julie Atlas Muz =

Burlesque performer (born 1973)

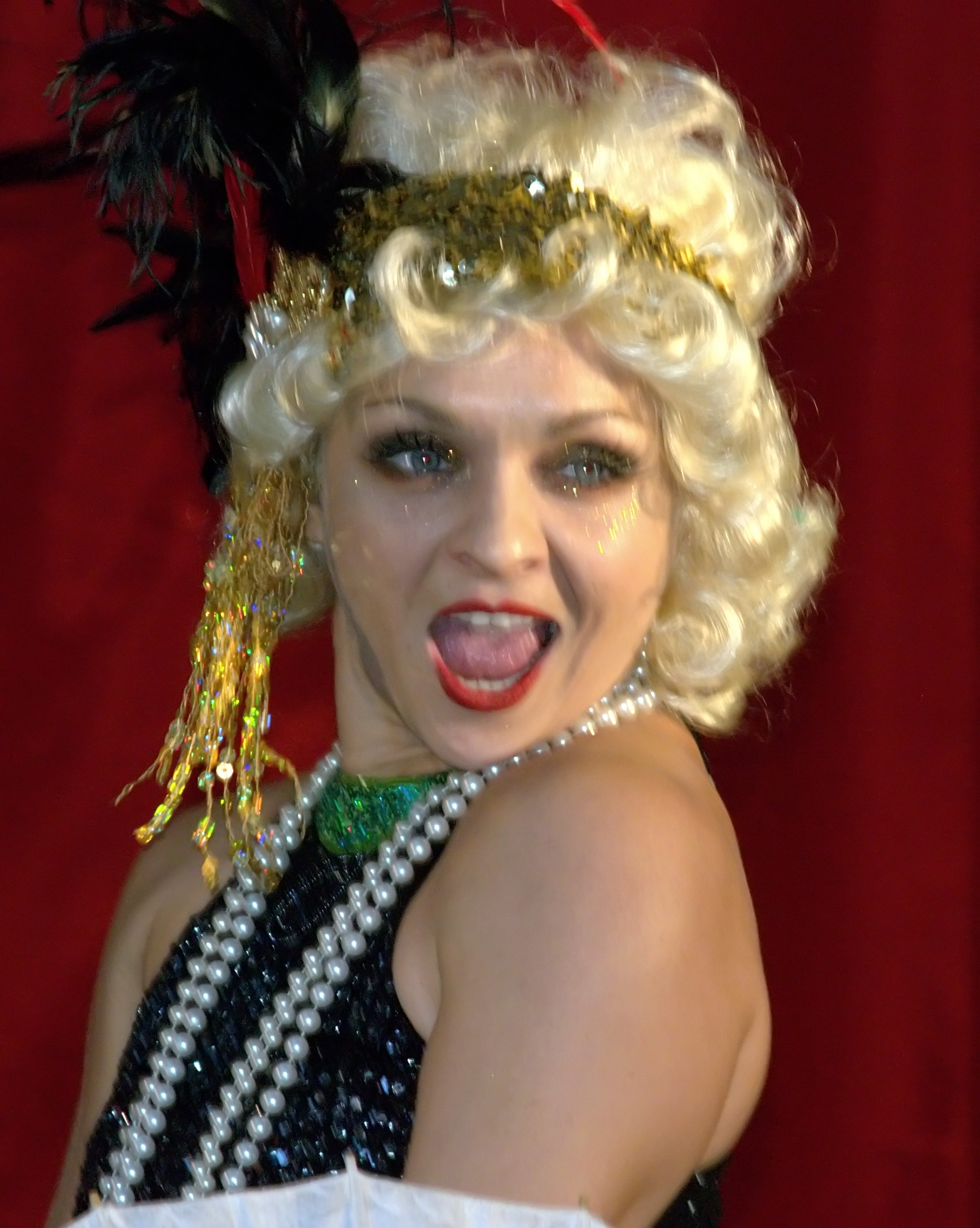
- Muz at the 2009 HOWL! Festival in New York City's East Village.
- Born: Julie Ann Muz; May 30, 1973 (age 53)
- Occupations: Performance artist; burlesque dancer; actress; stage director
- Spouse: Mat Fraser (m. 2012)
- Website: julieatlasmuz.com

Julie Atlas Muz (born Julie Ann Muz on May 30, 1973) is a New York City-based performance artist, dancer, burlesque artist, stage director, and actress. In 2012, she married English actor Mat Fraser.

Muz is best known as a performer in the New York City burlesque scene and neo-burlesque revival. She was the crown holder of the 2006 Miss Exotic World and the 2006 Miss Coney Island pageants. The New York Times calls her "the royalty of burlesque.

== Biography ==
Muz is a native of Detroit. She attended Oberlin College and graduated with a degree in dance and history.

== Performance ==
In the 2000s, Muz had a routine gig as the head mermaid at the now-defunct NYC nightclub, The Coral Room, where she performed alongside live fish in 9,000 gallon saltwater aquarium. She extended her mermaid role at the 2005 Valencia Biennial where she swam in Europe's largest saltwater tank. Muz trained Kate Winslet for her mermaid scenes in John Turturro's 2006 film, Romance and Cigarettes.

Muz was among the artists featured at the 2004 Whitney Biennial at the Whitney Museum of American Art. At the biennial, she and thirteen other cast members had performed her take on Igor Stravinsky's "The Rite of Spring" which is inspired by the life and death of JonBenét Ramsey.

In January 2007, Muz, along with Kembra Pfahler curated a mixed media art exhibition titled, Womanizer, at the Deitch Projects. The show included works by E. V. Day, Breyer P-Orridge, Vaginal Davis and burlesque performer Bambi the Mermaid. Muz's contribution was "Mr. Pussy", an exhibit of photos of her genitalia in various poses and props. The exhibit also featured video of "Mr. Pussy" greeting viewers with "welcome" in multiple languages.

On December 6, 2017, Muz made her directorial debut with Jack and the Beanstalk, the first large-scale pantomime to be presented in New York for over a century, at the Playhouse Theater of the Henry Street Settlement. Adapted from the fairy tale of the same title by Mat Fraser, the production also starred Dirty Martini, Matt Roper, David Ilku and a cast of other downtown performers. Awarded the NYT Critic's Pick, the production closed on December 23, 2017, and enjoyed a revival the following year at the same theater, running for three weeks during the 2018 holiday season. On December 4, 2021, a follow-up, Dick Rivington and The Cat, adapted from the traditional pantomime story of Dick Whittington, was presented by the pair and reprised the following year. On December 2, 2023, a third production, Sleeping Beauty, opened at the Abrons Arts Center.
