= Pillow (bodybuilder) =

American bodybuilder

Theresa Jean Bell
- Professional bodybuilder

Personal info
- Nickname: Pillow; She-Beast
- Born: April 17, 1956 (age 70); USA

Best statistics

Professional (Pro) career
- Best win: Gold's Classic; 1983

Theresa Jean Bell (born April 17, 1956), better known as Pillow, also known as The She-Beast, was a United States bodybuilder in the early 1980s. While competing in bodybuilding, she was also an exotic dancer in Alaska. She was crowned Miss Exotic World 1995. "Pillow" is her legal name.

== Biography ==
Pillow became an exotic dancer in San Francisco in 1976. She started at P.J.s in Anchorage, Alaska, in the summer of 1978, which was her exclusive club until 2000. "The pole" was added at P.J.'s and Pillow was unable to perform her shows without an obstacle in the center of the stage. So she regretfully retired.

Pillow was among the first muscular female bodybuilders. She won the 1983 Gold's Classic as a heavyweight, beating lightweight winner Lori Okami, middleweight Alison Brundage and other weight class entrants Reggie Bennett and Sue Ann McKean. Pillow was a non-competing guest performer in many bodybuilding shows up until 1993, and was the first to bring elements of burlesque, such as floor work and costuming, into bodybuilding.

Pillow is also a performer in the classic burlesque tradition, predating the rise of neo-burlesque and influencing its development. She supported the early days of the Miss Exotic World Pageant and The Burlesque Hall of Fame Museum. Pillow promoted Miss exotic World at GlamourCon. She won the title of Miss Exotic World in 1995 and being formally honored for her work the next year. She performed a Mermaid Number to win this title.

Pillow appeared on the cover of Women's Physique World September–October 1983 issue, and was featured in, among others, Muscle & Fitness (June 1982 and February 1984) and Flex (January and March 1984).

She appeared in the documentary Pumping Iron II: The Women and she was the subject of the GMV Productions DVD Pillow, The She-Beast. She also produced, directed and starred in a documentary about her experiences at Exotic World and The Burlesque Hall of Fame called Miss Exotic World 1995. She also made a film of her experiences as a dancer and performer, titled Pillow At P. J.'s. She was working on a documentary called "The Bump and Grindstone", which is an unfinished documentary started in 1993 and was never completed.

Pillow retired from women's competitive bodybuilding in the mid-1980s. She also power lifted for a few years after bodybuilding and retired from exotic dancing in 2000. Pillow performed a number at the annual Miss Exotic World Pageant in 1997 at the Helendale California desert location when the event was still held there. She danced as a Klingon, complete with two Klingon show boys each wielding a bat'leth. Pillow still performs burlesque and even has a Drag King persona named Hughes.

== Contest history ==
- 1981 AFWB American Championships (HeavyWeight) - 4th
- 1981 Alaska State Bodybuilding Competition - 1st Miss Alaska Physique
- 1981 Best in the West - 1st
- 1982 Women's National's - 6th
- 1983 NPC Nationals (Heavyweight) - 5th
- 1983 Gold's Classic - 1st
- 1995 Miss Exotic World
- 1996 Special Honorary Award from The Burlesque Hall of Fame
