= Anna Fur Laxis =

English model and neo-burlesque performer

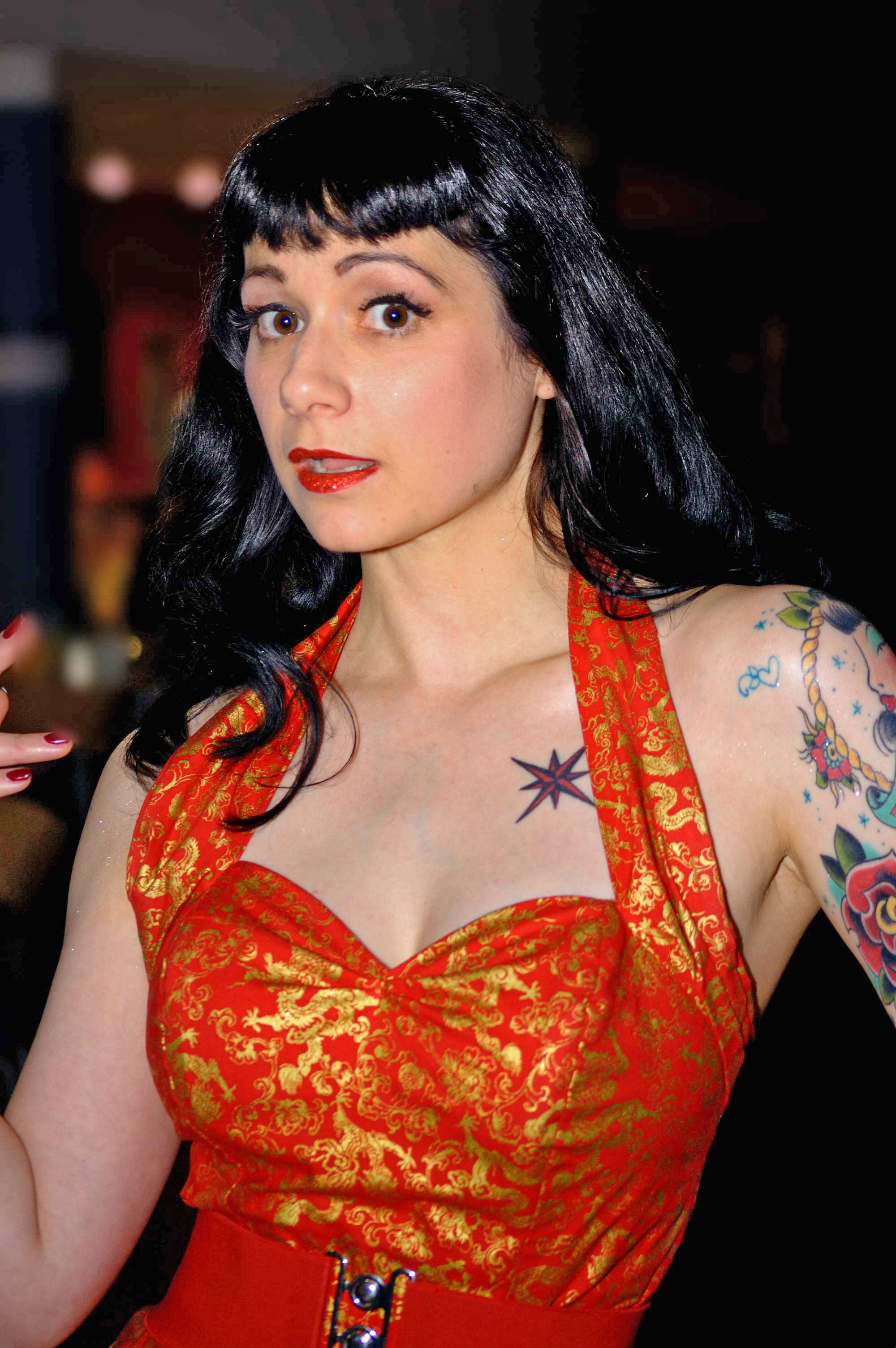
- Anna Fur Laxis at Leeds Light Night in 2008
- Occupations: Pin-up model; burlesque dancer

Anna Fur Laxis is an English pin-up model and burlesque dancer, particularly noteworthy for her extensive tattoos and her introduction of axe-throwing and other unusual skills into her work. Her performances include residencies at Jeepers Peepers Burlesque (York, England) and Wet Spot (Leeds, England), and have been acclaimed around the world. She also makes frequent appearances in print both as a model and as a celebrity, having appeared many times in 21st Century Pin-Ups magazine, Skin Deep magazine and Bizarre magazine.

She studied radiography at university, and in 2005 chose the name Anna Fur Laxis, a pun on anaphylaxis, for modelling, continuing to use it for burlesque dancing. She made her debut as a burlesque dancer in the Ruby Review in Leeds. Her tattoo on her left arm covers third-degree burns from an accident at a young age.

== Awards ==
In the Knife, Axe, Tomahawk Throwing Association UK Tournament, 2010, she finished second to Rich Sunderland in the 1 spin knife category, and joint second with Chris Bilton and Rose Bilton to Rich Sunderland in the 2 spin knife category.

She was first runner up to the winner, Miss Indigo Blue, in the Miss Exotic World Pageant 2011 at the Burlesque Hall of Fame.

== Acts ==
Her acts include:

Act	Description
Viva Bettie	A tribute to Bettie Page
Next	A feather fan dance
Memory of a Goldfish	She portrays a goldfish with glamorous ambitions
Cheesecake Cheesequake	A dance focused on the classic quiver and shimmy
Everything Stops for Tease	A fetishistic tea party performance
Castaway	A desert island survival story
Behind Enemy Lines	A wartime tale of evading capture
French Kiss	A tribute to European style and romance
Domestic Bliss	Anna shows her housewifery skills
Rudolph Clocks Off	A Christmas story about the after-hours activities of Santa's reindeer
Laxis of Evil	An axe-throwing, balloon-popping piece of circus-style entertainment
