= Jay Hoops =

American photographer

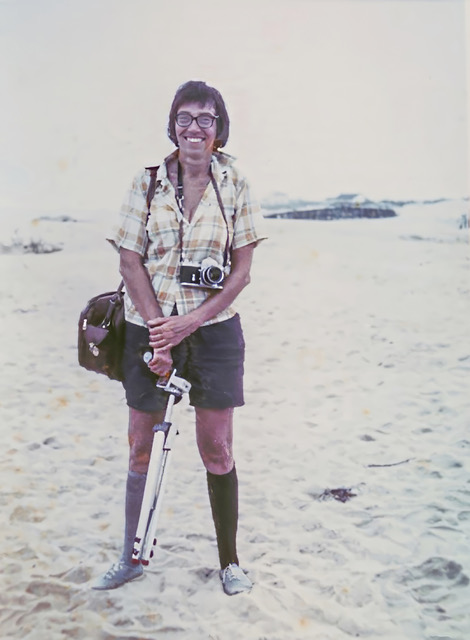
- Hoops in Southampton, NY, c.1955
- Born: Jane F. Hoops; November 22, 1918; New York City, U.S.
- Died: June 20, 2004 (aged 85)
- Occupation: Photographer

Jay Hoops (October 22, 1918–June 20, 2004) was an American photographer.

== Early life and education ==
Jay Hoops was born in New York City. Her father, Herman Ludwig Hoops, was a partner at Hawley & Hoops, a chocolate and confectionery company in Lower Manhattan. (Note: The Hawley & Hoops chocolate factory building now houses the Mulberry Street branch of the New York Public Library.)

Hoops studied photography first with Clarence White Jr. at The Clarence H. White School of Modern Photography and later with Alexey Brodovitch and Minor White.

== Career ==
By the late 1940s, Hoops had opened Jay Hoops Studios, a commercial photography studio in New York City, and took photography fashion assignments for TWA, photographed still-life, and did commercial and advertising photography, which appeared in popular magazines and on post cards. During its first years, Jay Hoops Studios also sold enamel-finished cigarette boxes with photographs on them. During the 1960s and 1970s, Hoops focused on architectural photography, taking assignments for Rockefeller Center, Harrison and Abramovitz, I.M. Pei, and others. In the early 1950s, she got a cottage in Hampton Bays and maintained studios in New York City and Schinnecock Hills. In the 1960s, she moved to Hampton Bays full-time and began photographing the local seascape, meadows, and beaches. Hoops' journalistic photography work regularly appeared in the newspapers of eastern Long Island. At the end of her life she was working with digitalized Polaroid.

Hoops became closely associated with Guild Hall in East Hampton, where she regularly photographed exhibitions, productions, plays, and other events; showed her own work; and taught courses. She was a founding member of the group Photographers East. She also led photography workshops at the Southampton Campus of Long Island University

She died on June 20, 2004.

== Personal life ==
Hoops married Richard Clemmer (1910–1980), whom she had met while working as a production assistant on One Man's Family and The Molly Goldberg Show, which Richard produced for NBC from 1949 to 1950. An animal lover, she was founding member of the Animal Rescue Fund of the Hamptons. and took pet portraits for ARF's publicity and fundraising materials.

== Exhibitions ==
By 1979, Hoops had participated in many group shows, including one at the Parrish Museum where she won the Judge's Award, and four one-woman shows at Long Island University, Guild Hall, and the Meisel Gallery in New York City.

- Impressions of Portugal and Spain (with Charlotte Jenkins). "[A color slide program] using a new technique for projecting pictures simultaneously on two screens." (April 1967)
- Impressions of Greece (with Charlotte Jenkins), Guild Hall of East Hampton, East Hampton, Long Island, NY, February 25, 1968
- It's Never Too Late, group exhibition, Guild Hall of East Hampton, East Hampton, Long Island, NY, September 1972
- Photographic Abstractions and Manipulations, August–September, 1992, East End Arts Council
- Jay Hoops: Polaroids, Wright State University: The Robert and Elaine Stein Galleries, August 26, 2022 – November 1, 2022, Tracy Longley-Cook and Gary Beeber (curators)
- Jay Hoops: a Memorial Exhibition, Guild Hall of East Hampton, East Hampton, Long Island, NY, November 13 – December 12, 2004
