= Miss Exotic World Pageant =

Burlesque convention

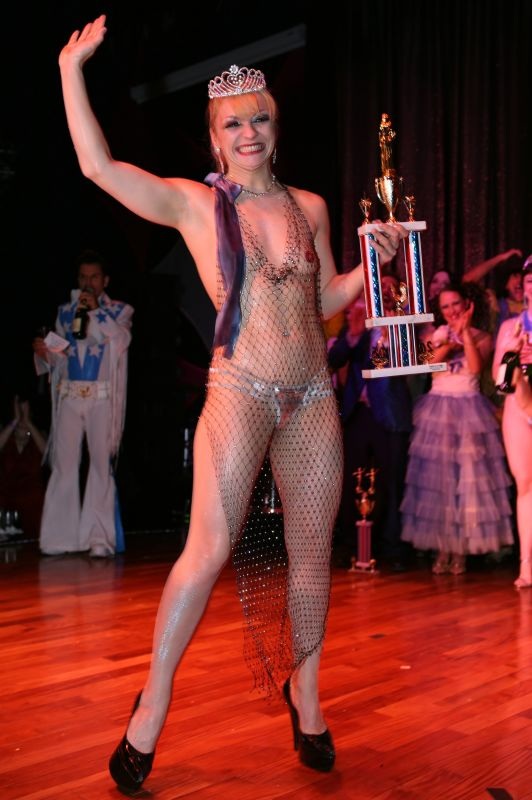
- Formation: 1990
- Type: burlesque pageant
- Headquarters: Las Vegas, Nevada, US
- Location: Las Vegas, Nevada, United States
- Official language: english
- Key people: Dixie Evans (founder)
- Parent organization: Burlesque Hall of Fame
- Website: www.burlesquehall.com/tag/miss-exotic-world/

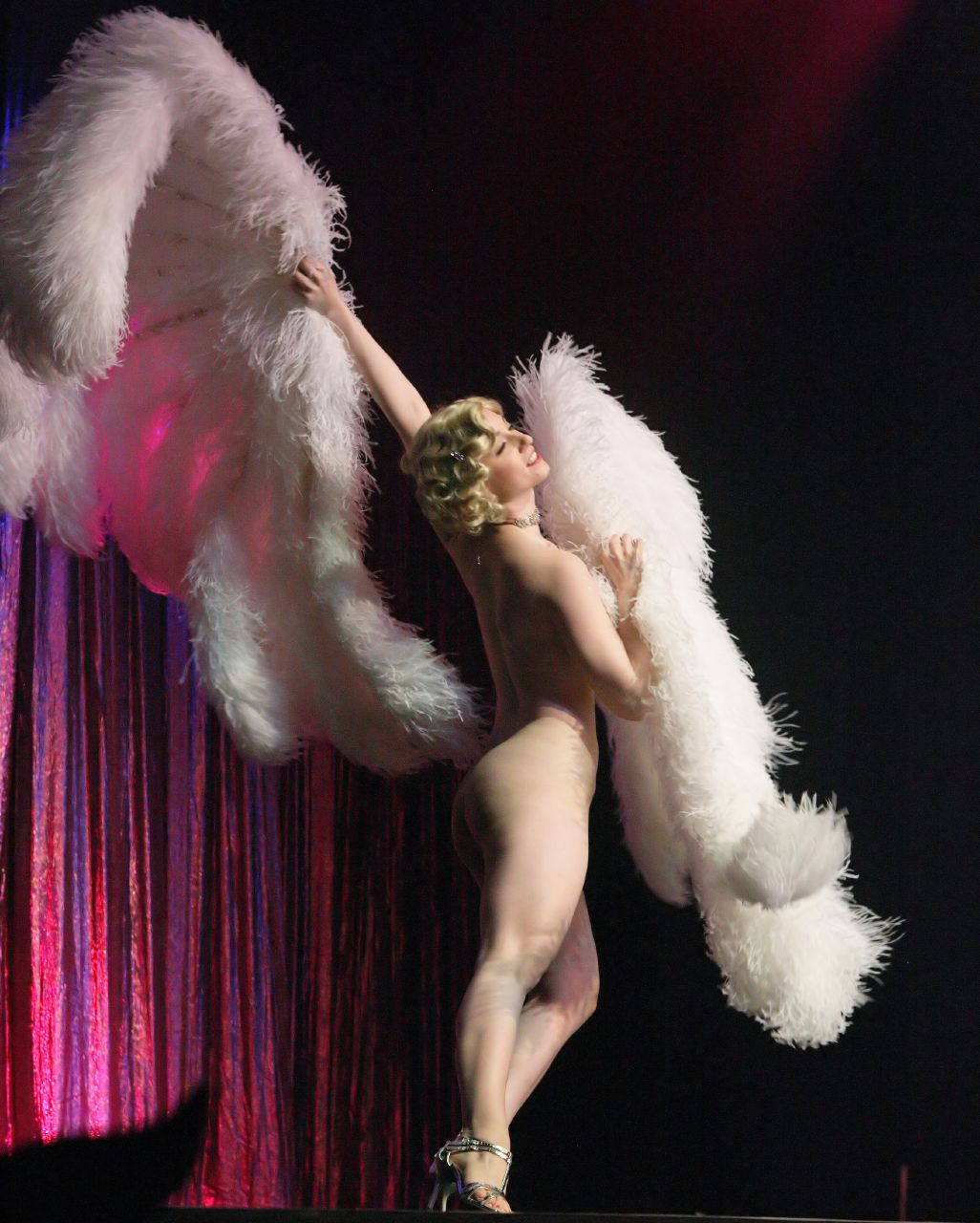
Fan dance by Miss Exotic World 2005 Michelle L'amour at the 2007 Miss Exotic World Pageant.

The Miss Exotic World Pageant (officially, the Miss Exotic World Pageant and Striptease Reunion) is an annual neo-burlesque pageant and convention, and is the annual showcase event (and fundraiser for) the Burlesque Hall of Fame (formerly the Exotic World burlesque museum). The pageant, sometimes referred to as the "Miss America of Burlesque", attracts former burlesque queens from past decades, as well as current participants of the neo-burlesque scene. The pageant consists of burlesque performances spanning a weekend, culminating with the competition to crown a single performer as Miss Exotic World. Because of the significance of the Exotic World Burlesque Museum to the burlesque community, winning the pageant is considered a top honor for a burlesque performer.

Artists such as Josh Ellingson, Mister Reusch and Mitch O’Connell have designed posters for the event.

== History ==
=== 1990 to 2004 ===
The pageant grew out an annual event held by Jennie Lee (dancer) and the Exotic Dancers' League (EDL), first held in 1958 and then annually through 1989. Awards were given out starting in 1962 to performers and promoters who furthered burlesque and showed it in a positive light. After Lee's death in 1990, the pageant was created and took place at the Exotic World Museum's grounds in Helendale, California from 1991 through 2005 before relocating to Las Vegas. Exotic World Museum curator Dixie Evans initiated the Miss Exotic World pageant in 1990 as a way to draw people to the museum. She garnered attention by sending out a press release claiming that "Lili St. Cyr, Tempest Storm, Blaze Starr and 30 other alumni of burlesque will all be invited to attend this reunion." While technically true, none of those invitees attended that year. However, the release garnered press attention for the pageant, which was successful enough to become an annual event, held on the first Saturday in June each year, close to the traditional time of year of the EDL's previous annual events.

1996's Rio Savant was the first black winner of the pageant, and would remain the only black winner for 20 years.

=== 2005 ===
In 2005, the pageant significantly expanded to mark its 15th year, as well as to accelerate the museum's fundraising efforts. Where originally the pageant had been a one-day event, it grew and was expanded to last a weekend after its first decade. The new format featured an entire evening dedicated to the "legends" – the mostly sexagenarian and septuagenarian women of burlesque's "golden age" of the 1950s and 1960s. Other new changes to the pageant included the expansion of financial sponsors; a glossy souvenir program; a celebrity master of ceremonies (El Vez); expanded seating (and shade areas); and a professional entertainment stage with sound and lighting as an improvement upon the aging wooden stage that had been used in previous years.

Some of the most significant changes by 2005 were changes to the pageant application and judging process; changes that had been initiated in 2001. The pageant had expanded from having only one "Miss Exotic World" category to now include other new categories such as Best Debut. Additionally, the application process was tightened up, with the evaluation method standardized to further ensure professionalism and fairness.

=== 2006 to 2019 ===
In 2006, the pageant took place in a new location, Las Vegas, in the wake of certain events that greatly affected the museum's operational ability. (Specifically, the state of disrepair of the property, and the death of property owner Charles Arroyo.) With the museum's impending move to Las Vegas, the pageant was held there, based at the Celebrity Theater in downtown Las Vegas. The pageant, up to that point held on the first Saturday in June, was instead held over Memorial Day weekend in late May, 2006. The pageant consisted of four evenings' worth of events and featured dual hosts Margaret Cho and El Vez. Since 2006, the pageant has made Las Vegas its permanent home. In 2016, Poison Ivory became the second black winner in the pageant's history, 20 years after Rio Savant.

=== 2020 to 2021 ===
The pageant did not take place in 2020 or 2021 due to the global COVID-19 pandemic, which resulted in widespread cancellations of live events and travel restrictions affecting festivals and performances worldwide.

=== 2022 to present ===
In 2023, the "Best Boylesque" category was abolished and all solo performance categories were opened to performers of all genders. The overall winner was also given the option to choose the title Miss, Mr., Mx., or another title that best reflects their identity, rather than being restricted to "Miss Exotic World".

== Miss Exotic World winners ==
Year	Miss Exotic World	1st Runner Up	2nd Runner Up
1991	Toni Alessandrini		
1992	Catherine D’Lish		
1993	AleXX Marvel		
1994	Catherine D’Lish		
1995	Pillow		
1996	Rio Savant		
1997	Stephanie Blake		
1998	Stephanie Blake		
1999	Kina Cochina		Ophelia Flame
2000	Christy Campbell	Manuella	
2001	Cherry Malone	Sarah Moon	Manuella
2002	Kitten de Ville	Bella Beretta, Manuella	
2003	Erochica Bamboo	Bambi, Miss Dirty Martini	
2004	Miss Dirty Martini	Penny Starr Jr.	World Famous *Bob*
2005	Michelle L’amour	Torchy Taboo	Julie Atlas Muz
2006	Julie Atlas Muz	Kalani Kokonuts	Diamondback Annie
2007	Immodesty Blaize	Little Brooklyn	Adonna Vichet
2008	Angie Pontani	Lux LaCroix	Trixie Little
2009	Kalani Kokonuts	Roxi D’Lite	Perle Noire
2010	Roxi D’Lite	Kristina Nekyia	Nasty Canasta
2011	Miss Indigo Blue	Anna Fur Laxis	Lily Verlaine
2012	Imogen Kelly	Ophelia Flame	Trixie Little
2013	LouLou D’vil	Sydni Deveraux	Lola Frost
2014	Midnite Martini	Medianoche	Ginger Valentine
2015	Trixie Little	Perle Noire	Ginger Valentine
2016	Poison Ivory	Lada Redstar	Sweetpea
2017	Medianoche	Sweetpea	Sydni Deveraux
2018	Inga	Jessabelle Thunder	Elle Dorado
2019	Frankie Fictitious	RedBone	Lou Lou la Duchesse de Rière
2020 - 2021	Competition not held due to COVID-19 pandemic.		
2022	Lou Lou la Duchesse de Rière	Moscato Sky	Aria Delanoche
2023	Samson Night	Moscato Sky	Faggedy Randy
2024	Ms. B LaRose	Margo Mayhem	Branbury Cross
2025	Jessabelle Thunder	Foxy Lexxi Brown	Violette Coquette
2026	Gin Minsky	Chola Magnolia	Peekaboo Pointe

BEST
Year	Best Boylesque	Best Debut	Best Duo/Small group	Best Troupe/Large group
2006	Tigger! (New York, NY)	Immodesty Blaize (London, UK)	Trixie Little & the Evil Hate Monkey (Baltimore, MD)	(tie) Murasaki Babydoll (Japan), Foxy Tann & the Wham-Bam Thank You Ma’ams(St. Paul, MN)
2007	Charlie Champale (Denver, CO)	Violet Eva (Tokyo, Japan)	The Heavenly Spies (Seattle, WA)	The Von Foxies (Seattle, WA)
2008	SinJyn (Denver, CO)	Perle Noire (New Orleans, LA)	Jewel of Denial & Kat Bardot (Los Angeles, CA)	The Peekaboo Revue (Philadelphia)
2009	Hot Toddy (Chicago, IL)	Melody Mangler (Vancouver, Canada)		Nanda (Portland, OR)
2010	The Evil Hate Monkey (Baltimore, MD)	MsTickle (New York, NY)		Chicago Starlets (Chicago, IL)
2011	Captain Kidd (Brisbane, Australia)	LouLou D’vil (Tampere, Finland)		The Stage Door Johnnies (Chicago, IL)
2012	Russell Bruner (Portland, OR)	Ruby Joule (Austin, Texas)	Frenchie Kiss and Jett Adore (Chicago, IL)	The Peek-A-Boo Revue (Philadelphia, PA)
2013	Ray Gunn (Chicago, Illinois)	Lada Redstar (Sarajevo – Former Yugoslavia)	Sandria Dore & Russell Bruner (Portland, Oregon)	Swing Time (Portland, Oregon)
2014	Mr. Gorgeous (New York, NY)	Bonnie Fox (London, United Kingdom)	Land of the Sweets (Seattle, WA)	The Ruby Revue (Dallas, TX)
2015	Matt Finish (Tucson, AZ)	Zelia Rose (Melbourne, Australia)	The Original Twins (Seattle, WA)	Jenny Rocha and Her Painted Ladies (New York, NY)
2016	Harden Reddy (Munich, Germany)	Gaea Lady (Chicago, Illinois)	2 To Fly (New York City, New York)	Screaming Chicken Theatrical Society (Vancouver, Canada)
2017	Lou Henry Hoover (New York, NY)	Musette the Mistress of Mischief (Minneapolis, MN)	Frankie Fictitious and Her Tattooed Man (Oakland, CA)	Perle Noire presents The House of Noire (New York City, NY)
2018	Ickymuffin (Dallas, TX)	Aria Delanoche (Montreal, Canada)	Mara & Alekseï (Paris, France)	Boys Night Revue (New York, NY)
2019	Joshua Dean (New York, New York)	Dahlia Fatale (Chicago, Illinois)	Kitten N’ Lou (New York, New York)	Mod Carousel (Seattle, Washington)
2020 - 2021	Competition not held due to COVID-19 pandemic.			
2022	P. NoNoire (Chicago, Illinois)	Joy Rider (Montreal, Canada)	Midnight Mayhem (New York, New York)	Fatbottom Cabaret (Austin, Texas)
2023		Margo May Hem (New York City, NY)	Kozmic Joy (Kozmic Skater and Joy Rider) (Montreal, Canada)	The Pin-Up Posse (Vancouver, Canada)
2024		Rhys Lightning (Sydney, Australia)	Lilly SnatchDragon & Mark Anthony (Chester, UK)	The Cheesecake Burlesque Revue (Victoria, BC)
2025		Matthew Pope (Perth, Australia)	Viola Panìk & Mister Punch (Caracas / Florence)	La Maison Lust (Vancouver / Calgary, Canada)
2026		Charlie Quinn Starling (United Kingdom/Las Vegas, NV)	Les Copines (New Orleans, LA)	The Rhinettes (Denver, CO)

MOST
Year	Most Classic	Most Comedic	Most Dazzling	Most Innovative
2006	Vienna La Rouge (Seattle, WA)		Rose Wood ("Most Exotic Move", New York, NY)	
2007	Immodesty Blaize (London, UK)			Pinchbottom Burlesque (Jonny Porkpie & Nasty Canasta) (New York, NY)
2008	Evie Lovelle (Los Angeles, CA)	Clams Casino (Brooklyn, NY)		Clams Casino (Brooklyn, NY) & Trixie Little (Baltimore, MD)
2009	The Amazing Knicker Kittens (Stockholm, Sweden)	Little Brooklyn (Brooklyn, NY)	Kalani Kokonuts (Las Vegas, NV)	Aerobella Trapeze (Brooklyn, NY)
2010	Mimi LeMeaux (San Diego, CA)	The Evil Hate Monkey (Baltimore, MD)	MsTickle (New York, NY)	MsTickle (New York, NY)
2011	Miss Indigo Blue (Seattle, WA)	The Dolls of Doom (Chicago, IL)	Captain Kidd (Brisbane, Australia)	Jett Adore (Chicago, IL)
2012	Ruby Joule (Austin, Texas)	April O’Peel (Vancouver, BC)	Perle Noire (New Orleans, LA)	Koko La Douce (Zürich, Switzerland)
2013	LouLou D’vil (Helsinki, Finland)	Mr. Gorgeous (New York, New York)	Sweetpea (Minneapolis, Minnesota)	Laurie Hagen (London, United Kingdom)
2014	Missy Lisa (Dallas, TX)	Kitten n’ Lou (Seattle, WA/New York, NY)	Bonnie Fox (London, United Kingdom)	Aurora Galore (London, UK)
2015	Ruby Joule (Austin, TX)	The Original Twins (Seattle, WA)	Raven Virginia (Calgary, Canada)	Jenny Rocha and Her Painted Ladies (New York, NY)
2016	Gaea Lady (Chicago, Illinois)	Screaming Chicken Theatrical Society (Vancouver, Canada)	Vicky Butterfly (London, United Kingdom)	Harden Reddy (Munich, Germany)
2017	Gin Minsky (Brooklyn, NY)	Tito Bonito (Los Angeles, CA)	Medianoche (New York City, NY)	Rubyyy Jones (London, UK)
2018	Aria Delanoche (Montreal, Canada)	BoylesqueTO (Toronto, Canada)	Chris Oh! (Auckland, New Zealand)	Boo Bess & Jenny C’est Quoi (Brooklyn, NY)
2019	Holly’s Good (Rome, Italy)	Faye Havoc & Donna Boss Rogers (Vancouver, Canada)	Frankie Fictitious (San Francisco, California)	Lou Lou la Duchesse de Riere (Kahnawake, Canada)
2020-2021	Competition not held due to COVID-19 pandemic.			
2022	Madison Jane (Asheville, North Carolina)	James & the Giant Pasty (Toronto, Canada)	P. NoNoire (Chicago, Illinois)	Samson Night (New York, New York)
2023	Ginevra Joyce (Rome, Italy)	Faggedy Randy (Chicago, IL)	Chris Oh! (Geneva, Switzerland)	Kozmic Joy (Kozmic Skater and Joy Rider) (Montreal, Canada)
2024	Violette Coquette (Edmonton, AB)	Lucy Lovegun (Perth, Australia)	Violette Coquette (Edmonton, AB)	Margo May Hem (New York City, NY)
2025	Jessabelle Thunder (Los Angeles, CA)	Viola Panìk & Mister Punch (Caracas / Florence)	Qween Quan (New Orleans, LA)	Margot Manifesto (South Bend, IN)
2026	Peekaboo Pointe (Milwaukee, WI) Most Classic	Hot Blonde Slvt (Perth, Australia) Most Comedic	Valerie Veils (Seattle, WA) Most Dazzling	Valerie Veils (Seattle, WA) Most Innovative
