= Erotic dance =

Dance meant to provide erotic entertainment or elicit erotic or sexual thoughts

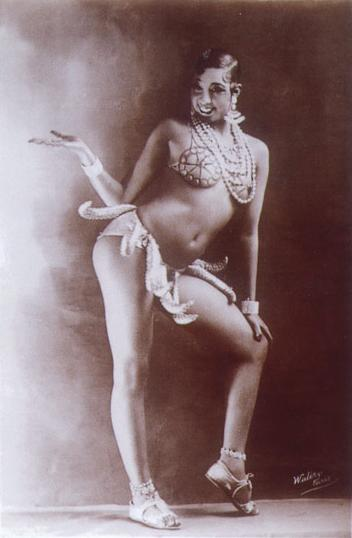
Josephine Baker in a cabaret dance routine

An erotic dance is a dance that provides erotic entertainment with the objective to erotically stimulate or sexually arouse viewers. Erotic dance is one of several major dance categories based on purpose, such as ceremonial, competitive, performance and social dance.

The erotic dancer's clothing is often minimal and may be gradually removed to be partially or completely naked. In some areas where exposure of nipples or genitals is illegal, a dancer may respectively wear pasties or a g-string to stay within the law.

Nudity, though a common feature, is not a requirement of erotic dance. The culture and the ability of the human body is a significant aesthetic component in many dance styles.

== Genres ==
- Can-can
- Cage dance
- Go-go dance
- Hoochie coochie
- Mujra
- Sexercise
- Striptease (Exotic dancer)
  - Pole dance
  - Bubble dance
  - Fan dance
  - Gown-and-glove striptease
  - Lap dance
    - Couch dance
    - Contact dance
    - Limo lap dance
  - Dance of the seven veils
  - Table dance
- Grinding
- Neo-Burlesque
- Twerking

== See also ==
- Fetish fashion
- List of dance style categories
- List of dances
- Nudes-A-Poppin'

== References and notes ==
- McMahon, Tiberius. Uniting Exotic And Erotic Dancers Worldwide, GlobalSecurityReport.com, 2006.
