= Burlesque =

Literary, dramatic or musical work or genre

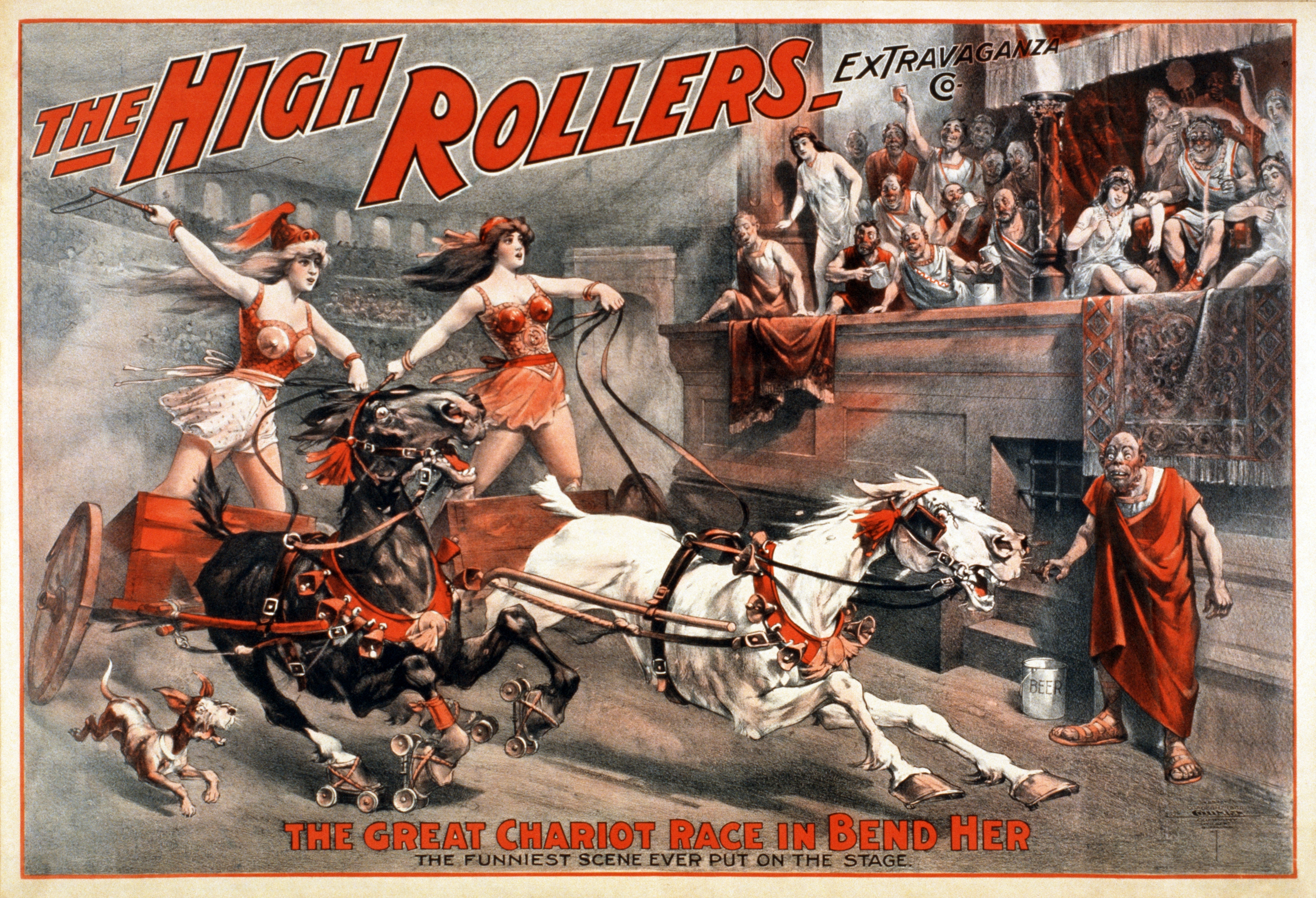
Burlesque on Ben-Hur, c. 1900

A burlesque (English pronunciation: /bɜːrˈlɛsk/; French pronunciation: [byʁlɛsk]) is a literary, dramatic or musical work intended to cause laughter by caricaturing the manner or spirit of serious works, or by ludicrous treatment of their subjects. The word is loaned from French and derives from the Italian burlesco, which, in turn, is derived from the Italian burla – a joke, ridicule or mockery.

Burlesque overlaps with caricature, parody and travesty, and, in its theatrical form, with extravaganza, as presented during the Victorian era. The word "burlesque" has been used in English in this literary and theatrical sense since the late 17th century. It has been applied retrospectively to works of Chaucer and Shakespeare and to the Graeco-Roman classics. Contrasting examples of literary burlesque are Alexander Pope's The Rape of the Lock and Samuel Butler's Hudibras. An example of musical burlesque is Richard Strauss's 1890 Burleske for piano and orchestra. Examples of theatrical burlesques include W. S. Gilbert's Robert the Devil and the A. C. Torr – Meyer Lutz shows, including Ruy Blas and the Blasé Roué.

A later use of the term, particularly in the United States, refers to performances in a variety show format. These were popular from the 1860s to the 1940s, often in cabarets and clubs, as well as theatres, and featured bawdy comedy and female striptease. Some Hollywood films attempted to recreate the spirit of these performances from the 1930s to the 1960s, or included burlesque-style scenes within dramatic films, such as 1972's Cabaret and 1979's All That Jazz, among others. There has been a resurgence of interest in this format since the 1990s.

== Literary origins and development ==
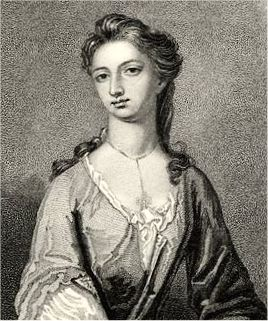
Arabella Fermor, target of The Rape of the Lock

The word first appears in a title in Francesco Berni's Opere burlesche of the early 16th century, works that had circulated widely in manuscript before they were printed. For a time, burlesque verses were known as poesie bernesca in his honour. "Burlesque" as a literary term became widespread in 17th century Italy and France, and subsequently England, where it referred to a grotesque imitation of the dignified or pathetic. Shakespeare's Pyramus and Thisbe scene in Midsummer Night's Dream and the general mocking of romance in Beaumont and Fletcher's The Knight of the Burning Pestle were early examples of such imitation.

In 17th century Spain, playwright and poet Miguel de Cervantes ridiculed medieval romance in his many satirical works. Among Cervantes' works are Exemplary Novels and the Eight Comedies and Eight New Interludes published in 1615. The term burlesque has been applied retrospectively to works of Chaucer and Shakespeare and to the Graeco-Roman classics.

Burlesque was, from the outset, intentionally ridiculous in its imitation of several styles and by combining imitations of certain authors and artists with absurd descriptions. In this, the term was often used interchangeably with "pastiche", "parody", and the 17th and 18th century genre of the "mock-heroic". Burlesque depended on the reader's (or listener's) knowledge of the subject to make its intended effect, and a high degree of literacy was taken for granted.

17th and 18th century burlesque was divided into two types: High burlesque refers to a burlesque imitation where a literary, elevated manner was applied to a commonplace or comically inappropriate subject matter as, for example, in the literary parody and the mock-heroic. One of the most commonly cited examples of high burlesque is Alexander Pope's "sly, knowing and courtly" The Rape of the Lock. Low burlesque applied an irreverent, mocking style to a serious subject; an example is Samuel Butler's poem Hudibras, which describes the misadventures of a Puritan knight in satiric doggerel verse, using a colloquial idiom. Butler's addition to his comic poem of an ethical subtext made his caricatures into satire.

In more recent times, burlesque – true to its literary origins – is still performed in revues and sketches. Tom Stoppard's 1974 play Travesties is an example of a full-length play drawing on the burlesque tradition.

== In music ==
=== Classical music ===
Beginning in the early 18th century, the term burlesque was used throughout Europe to describe musical works in which serious and comic elements were juxtaposed or combined to achieve a grotesque effect. As derived from literature and theatre, "burlesque" was used, and is still used, in music to indicate a bright or high-spirited mood, sometimes in contrast to seriousness.

In this sense of farce and exaggeration rather than parody, it appears frequently on the German-language stage between the middle of the 19th century and the 1920s. Burlesque operettas were written by Johann Strauss II (Die lustigen Weiber von Wien, 1868), Ziehrer (Mahomed's Paradies, 1866; Das Orakel zu Delfi, 1872; Cleopatra, oder Durch drei Jahrtausende, 1875; In fünfzig Jahren, 1911) and Bruno Granichstaedten (Casimirs Himmelfahrt, 1911). French references to burlesque are less common than German, though Grétry composed for a "drame burlesque" (Matroco, 1777). Stravinsky called his 1916 one-act chamber opera-ballet Renard (The Fox) a "Histoire burlesque chantée et jouée" (burlesque tale sung and played) and his 1911 ballet Petrushka a "burlesque in four scenes". A later example is the 1927 burlesque operetta by Ernst Krenek entitled Schwergewicht (Heavyweight) (1927).

Burleske
Burleske (1885–86), by Richard Strauss. Performed by Neal O'Doan with the Seattle Philharmonic Orchestra

Some orchestral and chamber works have also been designated as burlesques, of which two early examples are the Ouverture-Suite Burlesque de Quixotte, TWV 55, by Telemann and the Sinfonia Burlesca by Leopold Mozart (1760). Another often-performed piece is Richard Strauss's 1890 Burleske for piano and orchestra. Other examples include the following:

- 1901: Six Burlesques, Op. 58 for piano four hands by Max Reger
- 1904: Scherzo Burlesque, Op. 2 for piano and orchestra by Béla Bartók
- 1911: Three Burlesques, Op. 8c for piano by Bartók
- 1920: Burlesque for Piano, by Arnold Bax
- 1931: Ronde burlesque, Op. 78 for orchestra by Florent Schmitt
- 1932: Fantaisie burlesque, for piano by Olivier Messiaen
- 1956: Burlesque for Piano and Chamber Orchestra, Op. 13g by Bertold Hummel
- 1982: Burlesque for Wind Quintet, Op. 76b by Hummel

Burlesque can be used to describe particular movements of instrumental musical compositions, often involving dance rhythms. Examples are the Burlesca, in Partita No. 3 for keyboard (BWV 827) by Bach, the "Rondo-Burleske" third movement of Symphony No. 9 by Mahler, and the "Burlesque" fourth movement of Shostakovich's Violin Concerto No. 1.

=== Jazz ===
The use of burlesque has not been confined to classical music. Well-known ragtime travesties include Russian Rag, by George L. Cobb, which is based on Rachmaninoff's Prelude in C-sharp minor, and Harry Alford's Lucy's Sextette based on the sextet, 'Chi mi frena in tal momento?', from Lucia di Lammermoor by Donizetti.

== Victorian theatrical burlesque ==
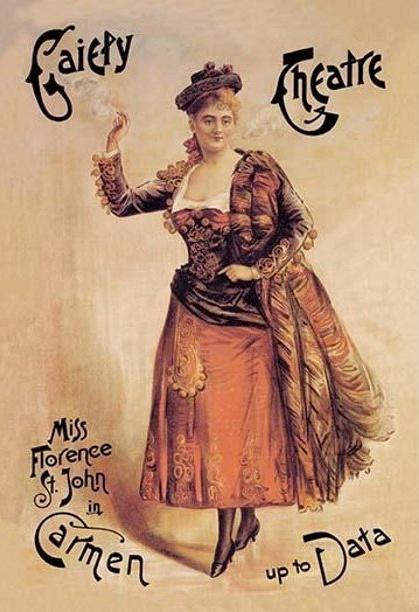
Florence St. John in Carmen up to Data

Victorian burlesque, sometimes known as "travesty" or "extravaganza", was popular in London theatres between the 1830s and the 1890s. It took the form of musical theatre parody in which a well-known opera, play or ballet was adapted into a broad comic play, usually a musical play, often risqué in style, mocking the theatrical and musical conventions and styles of the original work, and quoting or pastiching text or music from the original work. The comedy often stemmed from the incongruity and absurdity of the classical subjects, with realistic historical dress and settings, being juxtaposed with the modern activities portrayed by the actors. Madame Vestris produced burlesques at the Olympic Theatre beginning in 1831 with Olympic Revels by J. R. Planché. Other authors of burlesques included H. J. Byron, G. R. Sims, F. C. Burnand, W. S. Gilbert and Fred Leslie.

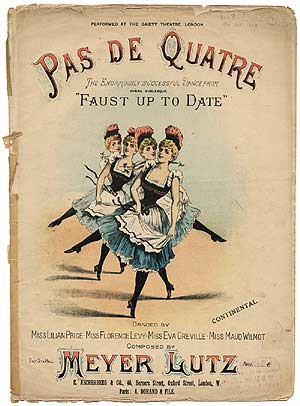
Sheet music from Faust up to Date

Programme: Ruy Blas and the Blasé Roué

Victorian burlesque related to and in part derived from traditional English pantomime "with the addition of gags and 'turns'." In the early burlesques, following the example of ballad opera, the words of the songs were written to popular music; later burlesques mixed the music of opera, operetta, music hall and revue, and some of the more ambitious shows had original music composed for them. This English style of burlesque was successfully introduced to New York in the 1840s.

Some of the most frequent subjects for burlesque were the plays of Shakespeare and grand opera. The dialogue was generally written in rhyming couplets, liberally peppered with bad puns. A typical example from a burlesque of Macbeth: Macbeth and Banquo enter under an umbrella, and the witches greet them with "Hail! hail! hail!" Macbeth asks Banquo, "What mean these salutations, noble thane?" and is told, "These showers of 'Hail' anticipate your 'reign'". A staple of burlesque was the display of attractive women in travesty roles, dressed in tights to show off their legs, but the plays themselves were seldom more than modestly risqué.

Burlesque became the speciality of certain London theatres, including the Gaiety and Royal Strand Theatre from the 1860s to the early 1890s. Until the 1870s, burlesques were often one-act pieces running less than an hour and using pastiches and parodies of popular songs, opera arias and other music that the audience would readily recognize. The house stars included Nellie Farren, John D'Auban, Edward Terry and Fred Leslie. From about 1880, Victorian burlesques grew longer, until they were a whole evening's entertainment rather than part of a double- or triple-bill. In the early 1890s, these burlesques went out of fashion in London, and the focus of the Gaiety and other burlesque theatres changed to the new more wholesome but less literary genre of Edwardian musical comedy.

== American burlesque ==
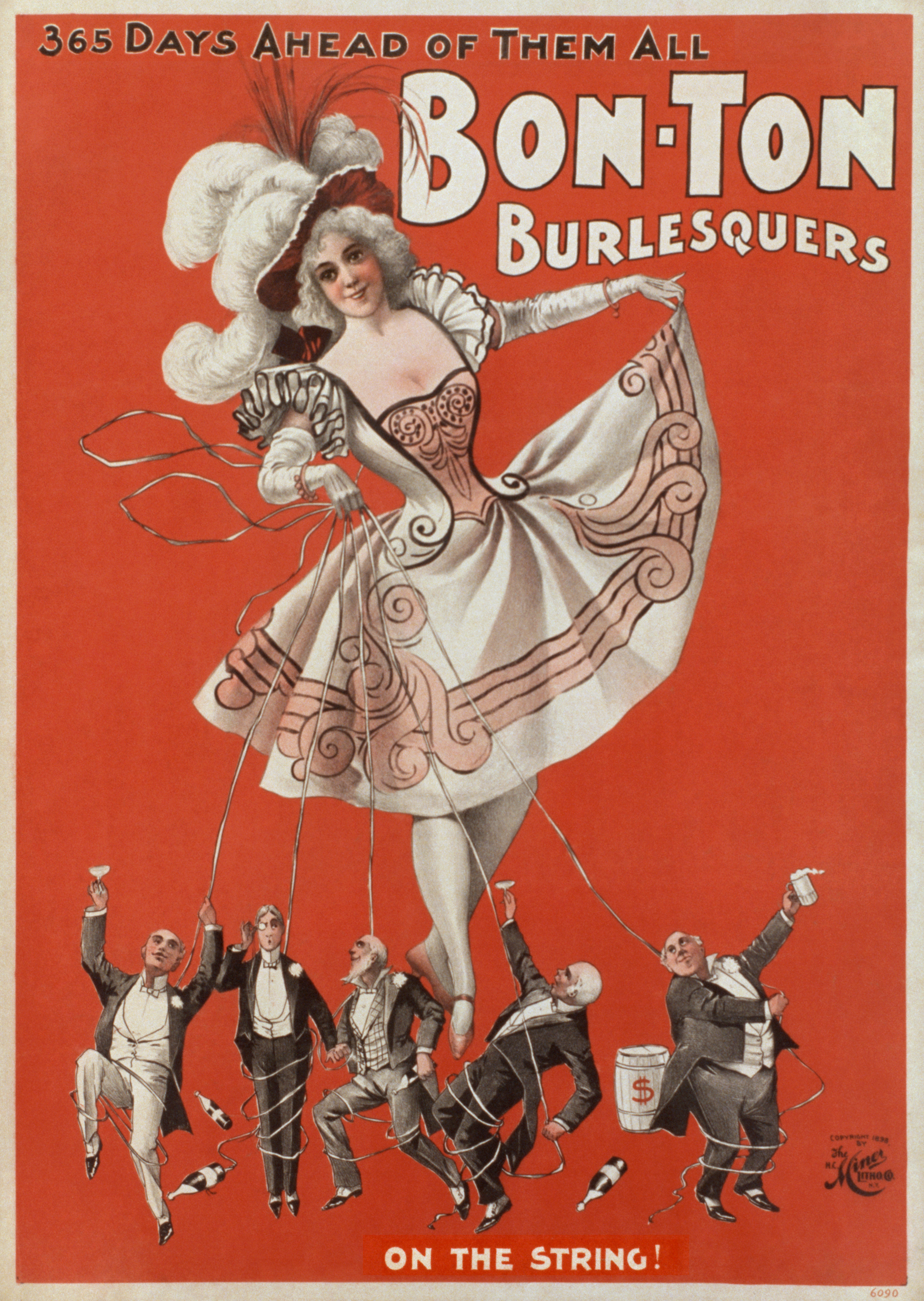
Advertisement for a US burlesque troupe, 1898

American burlesque shows were originally an offshoot of Victorian burlesque. The English genre had been successfully staged in New York from the 1840s, and it was popularised by a visiting British burlesque troupe, Lydia Thompson and the "British Blondes", beginning in 1868. New York burlesque shows soon incorporated elements and the structure of the popular minstrel shows. They consisted of three parts: first, songs and ribald comic sketches by low comedians; second, assorted olios and male acts, such as acrobats, magicians and solo singers; and third, chorus numbers and sometimes a burlesque in the English style on politics or a current play. The entertainment was usually concluded by an exotic dancer or a wrestling or boxing match.

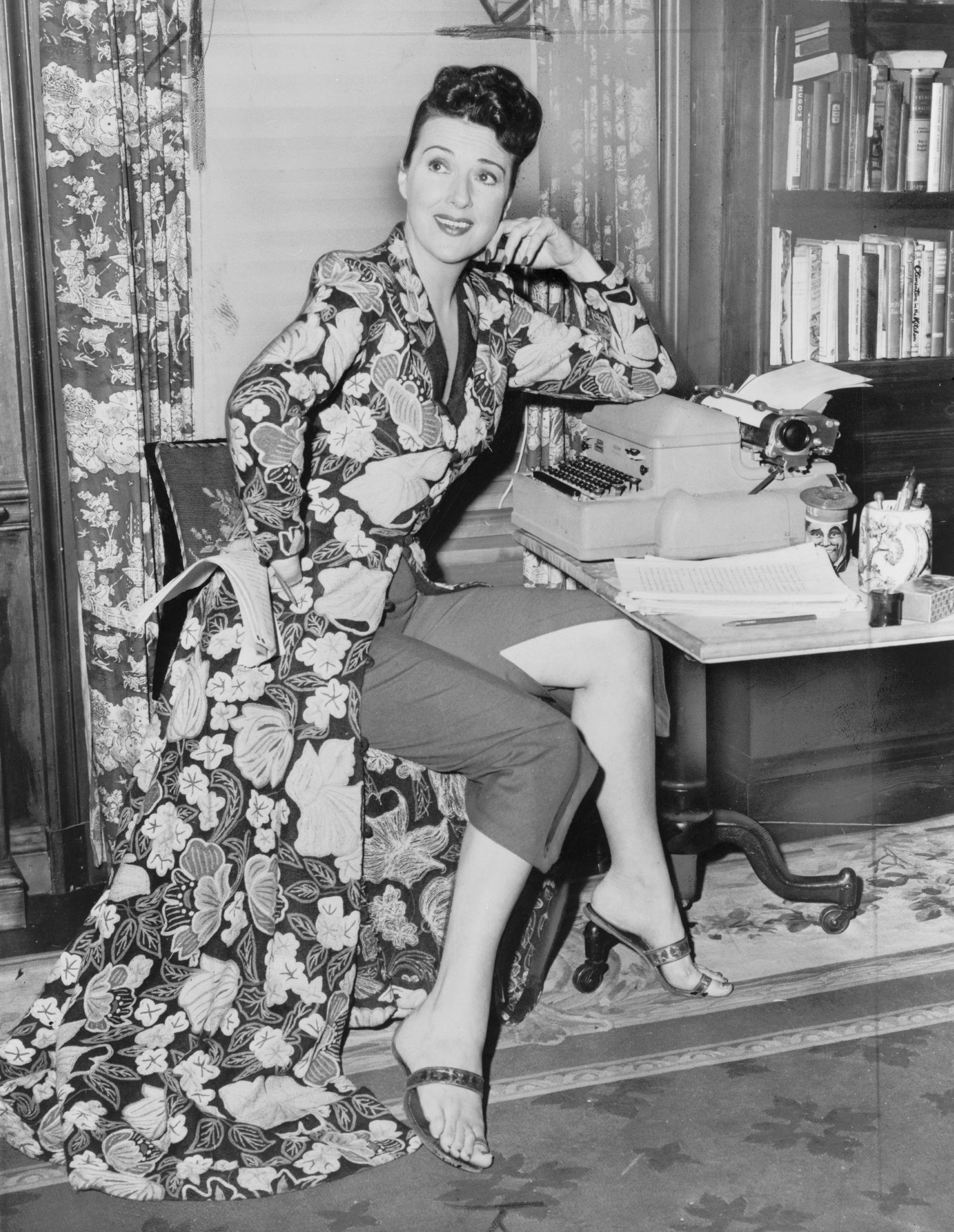
Gypsy Rose Lee

The entertainments were given in clubs and cabarets, as well as music halls and theatres. By the early 20th century, there were two national circuits of burlesque shows competing with the vaudeville circuit, as well as resident companies in New York, such as Minsky's at the Winter Garden. The transition from burlesque on the old lines to striptease was gradual. At first, soubrettes showed off their figures while singing and dancing; some were less active but compensated by appearing in elaborate stage costumes. The strippers gradually supplanted the singing and dancing soubrettes; by 1932 there were at least 150 strip principals in the US. Star strippers included Sally Rand, Gypsy Rose Lee, Tempest Storm, Lili St. Cyr, Blaze Starr, Ann Corio and Margie Hart, who was celebrated enough to be mentioned in song lyrics by Lorenz Hart and Cole Porter. By the late 1930s, burlesque shows would have up to six strippers supported by one or two comics and a master of ceremonies. Comics who appeared in burlesque early in their careers included Fanny Brice, Mae West, Eddie Cantor, Abbott and Costello, W. C. Fields, Jackie Gleason, Danny Thomas, Al Jolson, Bert Lahr, Phil Silvers, Sid Caesar, Danny Kaye, Red Skelton and Sophie Tucker.

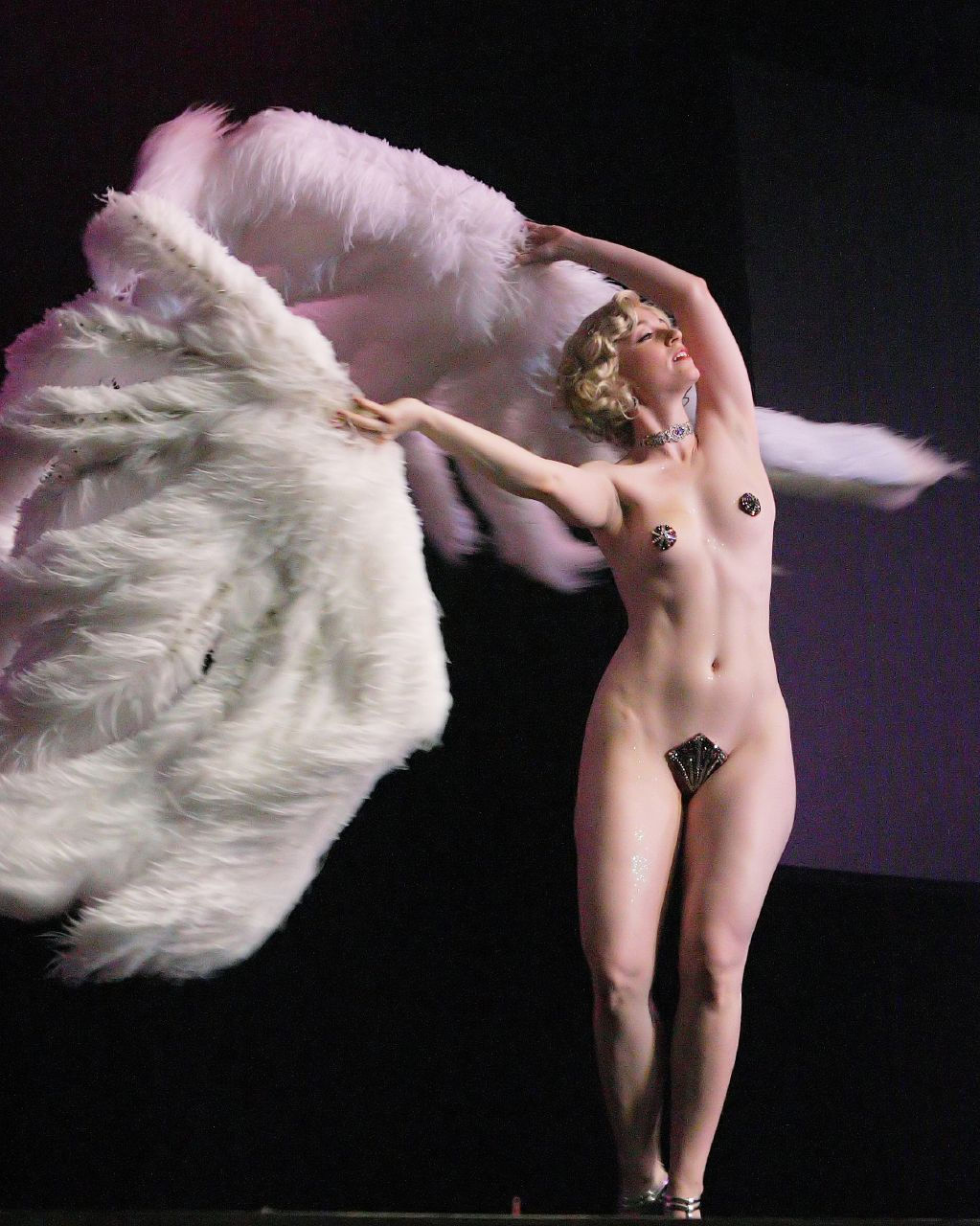
Michelle L'amour, 2005 Miss Exotic World

The uninhibited atmosphere of burlesque establishments owed much to the free flow of alcoholic liquor, and the enforcement of Prohibition was a serious blow. In New York, Mayor Fiorello H. La Guardia clamped down on burlesque, effectively putting it out of business by the early 1940s. It lingered on elsewhere in the US, increasingly neglected, and by the 1970s, with nudity commonplace in theatres, reached "its final shabby demise." Both during its declining years and afterwards there have been films that sought to capture American burlesque, including Lady of Burlesque (1943), Striporama (1953), and The Night They Raided Minsky's (1968).

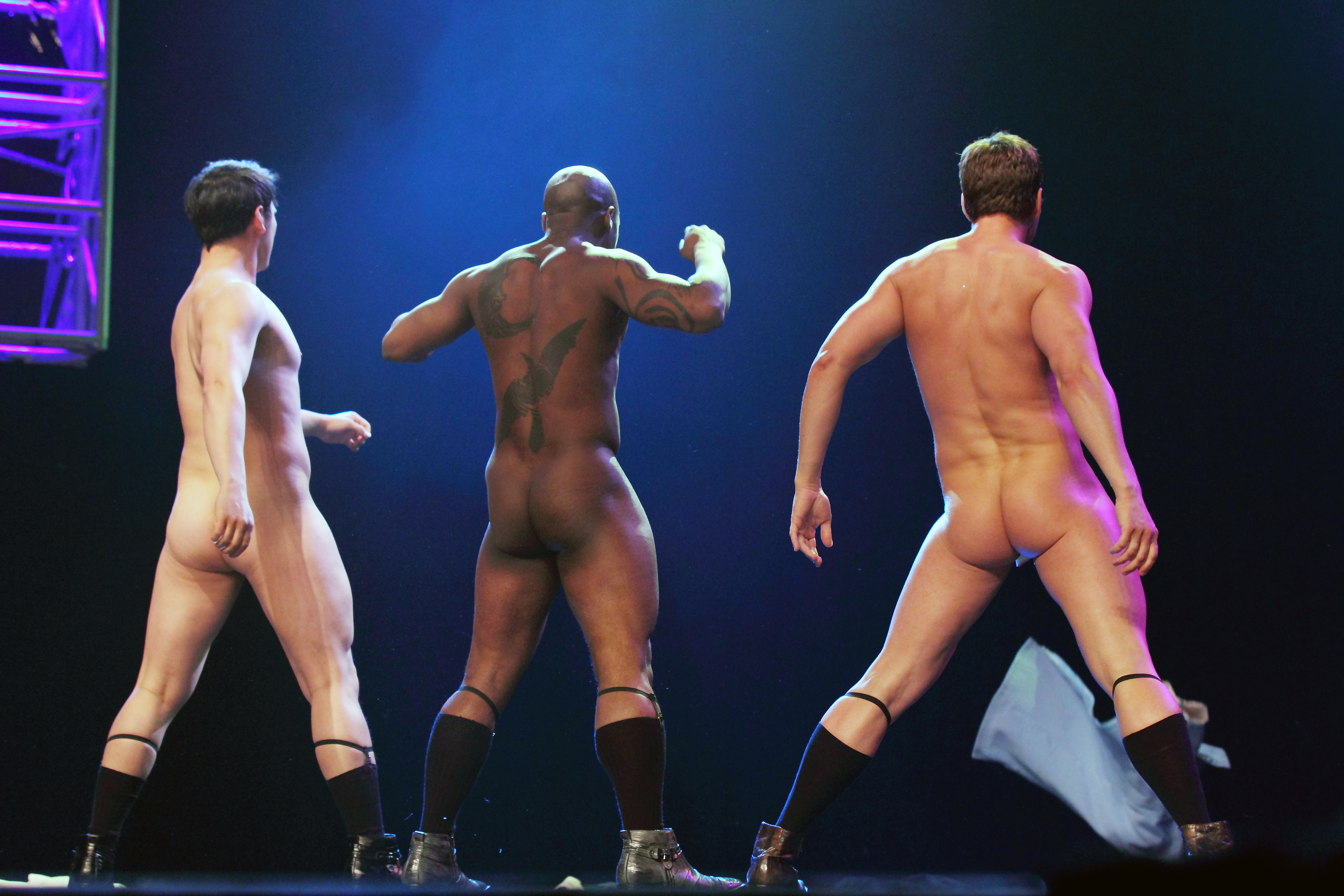
The "Stage Door Johnnies", Burlesque Hall of Fame, Las Vegas, 2011

In recent decades, there has been a revival of burlesque, sometimes called Neo-Burlesque, on both sides of the Atlantic. A new generation, nostalgic for the spectacle and perceived glamour of the classic American burlesque, developed a cult following for the art in the early 1990s at Billie Madley's "Cinema" and later at the "Dutch Weismann's Follies" revues in New York City, "The Velvet Hammer" troupe in Los Angeles and The Shim-Shamettes in New Orleans. Ivan Kane's Royal Jelly Burlesque Nightclub at Revel Atlantic City opened in 2012. Notable Neo-burlesque performers include Dita Von Teese, and Julie Atlas Muz and Agitprop groups like Cabaret Red Light incorporated political satire and performance art into their burlesque shows. Annual conventions such as the Vancouver International Burlesque Festival and the Miss Exotic World Pageant are held.

== See also ==
- Cabaret
- Nightclub act
- Striptease
