= Michelle L'amour =

American neo-burlesque performer

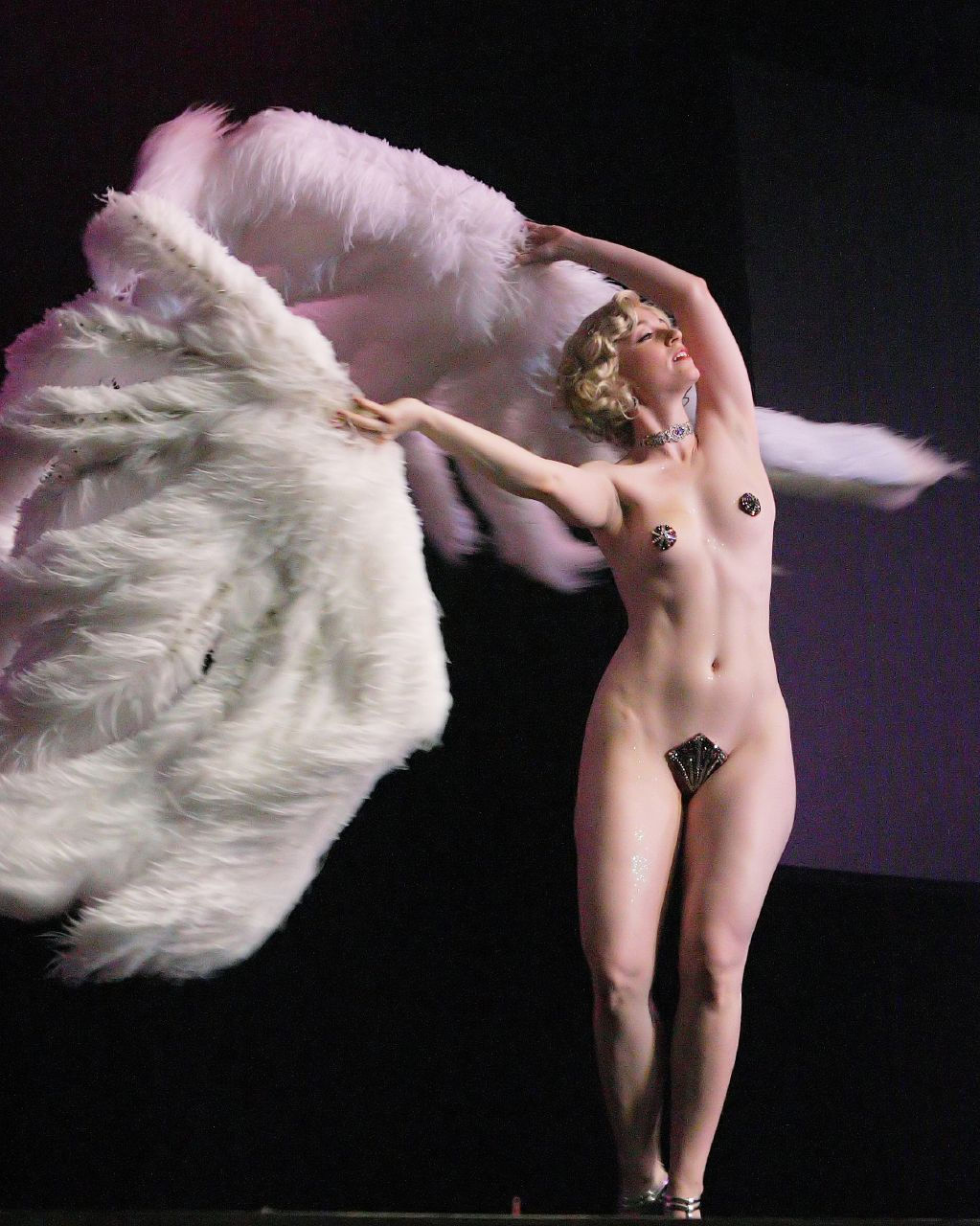
- Michelle L'amour performing her fan dance (2007)
- Born: April 15, 1980 (age 46); Orland Park, Illinois, US
- Education: University of Illinois
- Occupation: Neo-Burlesque performer
- Known for: Miss Exotic World 2005

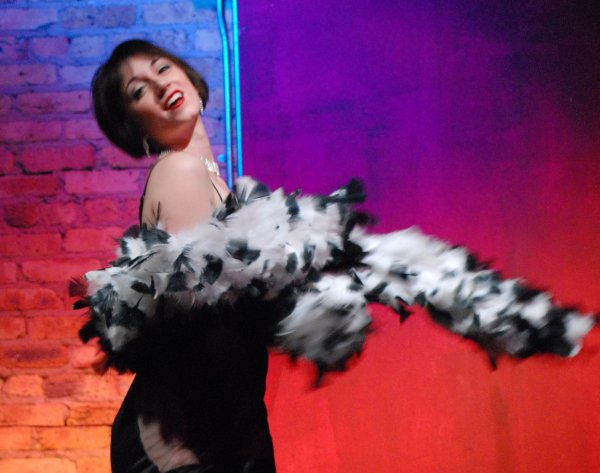
Michelle L'amour performing in 2007

Michelle L'amour (born April 15, 1980) is an American neo-burlesque performer who grew up in Orland Park, Illinois. In 2006, she performed stripteases on NBC's America's Got Talent, Showtime's Sexual Healing, and in small touring performances. Her tagline is "The Ass That Goes POW!" and she sells related promotional products (e.g. The Michelle L'amour Signature Fanny Facial).

== Early life and performances ==
Michelle L'amour was born on April 15, 1980, and began studying ballet, jazz, hip hop, modern and lyrical dancing at the age of 15. She began dancing burlesque striptease at age 22.

While earning a degree in finance from the University of Illinois, she began her dancing career. Weeks before graduation, she began choreographing for a rock-n-roll revue and developing what would later be her burlesque troupe Lavender (later named The Lavender Cabaret).

She won the title of Miss Exotic World 2005 with her Snow White routine, after three years as a burlesque dancer. In November 2012 she performed on the French show France got talent. Michelle L'amour went directly to the semi-final of the show.

== Later activities ==
She has performed her novelty act on numerous television programs, including Fox's A Current Affair, STAR Network (Canada) Everything..., MSNBC's The Situation with Tucker Carlson, Showtime's Sexual Healing and NBC's America's Got Talent. Studio L’amour opened officially in June 2008 in response to the overwhelming call for Michelle L’amour to open her own burlesque instruction school. She had been teaching the L'amour Method for four years across the globe (at festivals, workshops, and shows) before opening the facility.
