= Neo-burlesque =

Performing arts genre

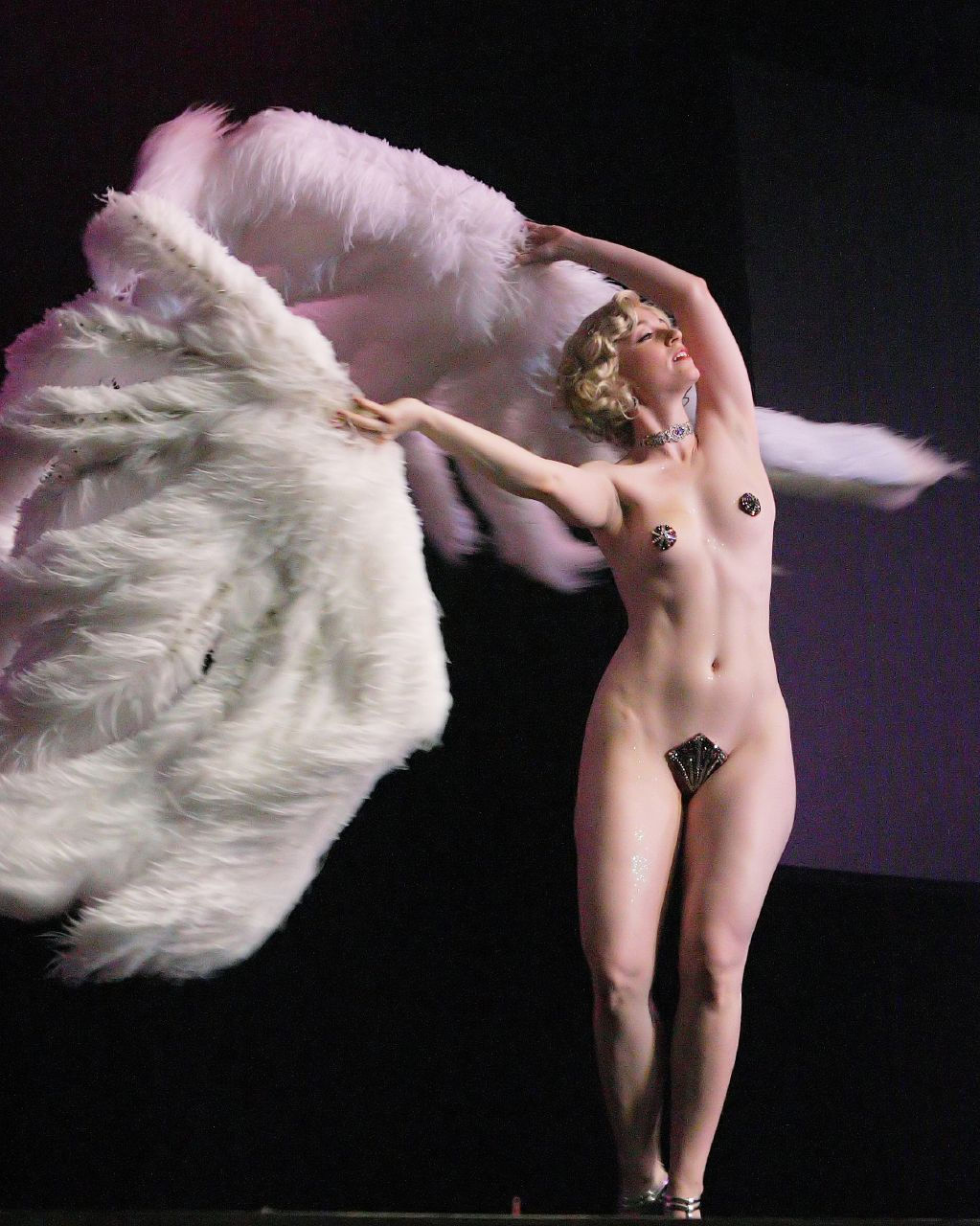
Michelle L'amour, 2005 winner of the Miss Exotic World Pageant dancing with fans, 2007

Neo-burlesque, or new burlesque, is the revival and updating of the traditional American burlesque performance. Though based on the traditional burlesque art, the new form encompasses a wider range of performance styles; neo-burlesque can include anything ranging from classic striptease to modern dance to theatrical mini-dramas to comedic mayhem.

== Burlesque history ==
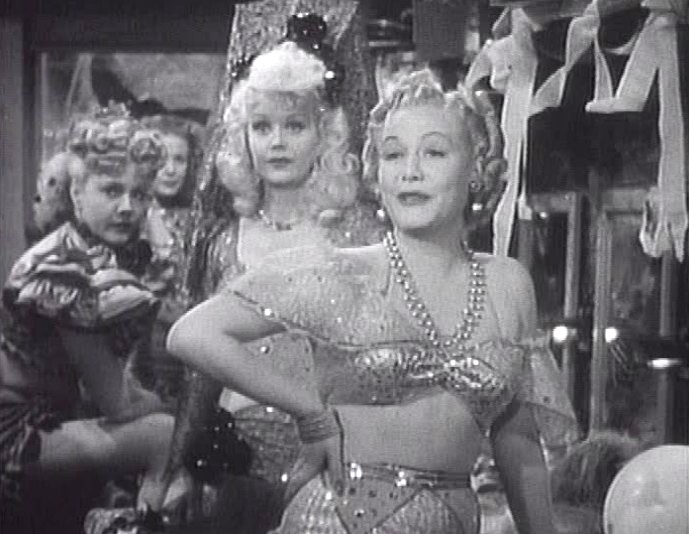
Marion Martin and Gloria Dickson in the film Lady of Burlesque

Burlesque was taken to America from Britain in the late 1860s by Lydia Thompson and her British Blondes, a troupe who spoofed traditional theatrical productions and featured ladies performing men's roles, in costumes considered revealing for the time period. American burlesque soon assimilated music hall, minstrel shows, striptease, comedy and cabaret styles to evolve from the follies of the twenties and thirties to the girlie shows of the 40s and 50s, which eventually gave way to the modern strip club. The striptease element of burlesque became subject to extensive local legislation, leading to a theatrical form that titillated without falling foul of censors.

By the late 1930s, a social crackdown on burlesque shows began their gradual decline. The shows had slowly changed from ensemble ribald variety performances to simple performances focusing mostly on the striptease. In New York, Mayor Fiorello LaGuardia clamped down on burlesque, effectively putting it out of business by the early 1940s. Burlesque lingered on elsewhere in the U.S., increasingly neglected, and by the 1970s, with nudity commonplace in theatres, American burlesque reached "its final, shabby demise".

During its declining years and afterwards, films sought to capture the spirit of American burlesque. For example, in I'm No Angel (1933), Mae West performed a burlesque act. The 1943 film Lady of Burlesque depicts the back-stage life of burlesque performers. Pin-up girl Bettie Page's most famous features included Striporama (1953). In such films, the girls wore revealing costumes, but there was never any nudity. The Night They Raided Minsky's (1968) celebrates classic American burlesque.

== Revival ==
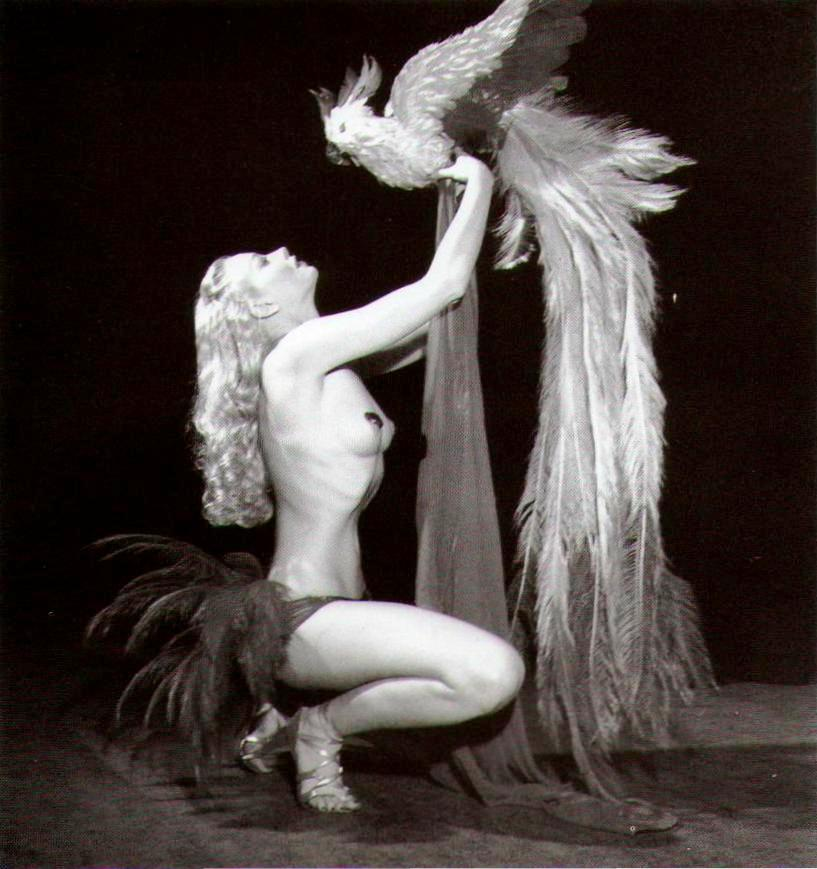
Artists such as Lili St. Cyr inspired the revival of the burlesque movement

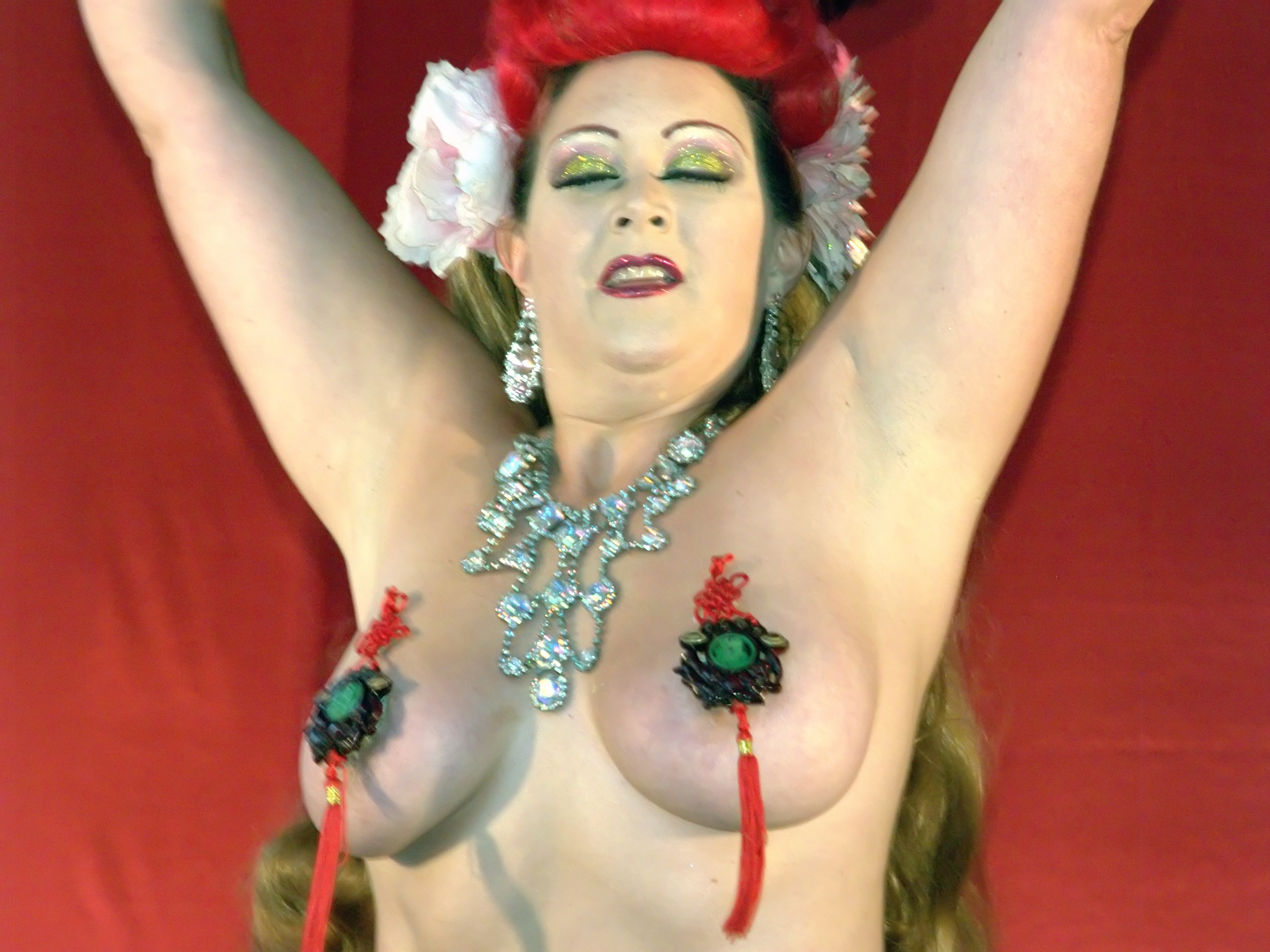
Miss Dirty Martini at the 2009 Howl Festival in New York

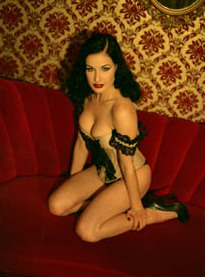
Dita Von Teese, a well-known neo-burlesque artist

A new generation nostalgic for the spectacle and glamour of the old times was determined to bring burlesque back. The first neo-burlesque club in NYC was the Blue Angel Cabaret, 1994. The Red Vixen Burlesque, which followed in 1998, served as a launchpad for some of the better known neo-burlesque dancers working today, including Dirty Martini and Julie Atlas Muz. Le Scandal Cabaret, founded in 2001, is a direct offshoot of the Blue Angel, and is still currently running in NYC in 2018. This revival was originally pioneered independently in the mid-1990s by Billie Madley (e.g., "Cinema", Tony Marando's "Dutch Weismanns' Follies" revue) in New York and Michelle Carr's "The Velvet Hammer Burlesque" troupe in Los Angeles. In addition, and throughout the country, many individual performers were incorporating aspects of burlesque in their acts. These productions, inspired by Sally Rand, Tempest Storm, Gypsy Rose Lee, Dixie Evans and Lili St. Cyr amongst others have themselves gone on to inspire a new generation of performers.

Modern burlesque has taken on many forms, but it has the common trait of honoring one or more of burlesque's previous incarnations. The acts tend to put emphasis on style and are sexy rather than sexual. A typical burlesque act usually includes striptease, expensive or garish costumes, and bawdy humor, and may incorporate elements of cabaret, circus skills, aerial silk, and more; sensuality, performance, and humor are kept in balance. Unlike professional strippers, burlesque performers often perform for fun and spend more money on costumes, rehearsal, and props than they are compensated. Although performers may still strip down to pasties and g-string or merkin, the purpose is no longer solely sexual gratification for men but self-expression of the performer and, vicariously, the women in the audience. The DIY aspect is prominent, and furthermore the striptease may be used to challenge sexual objectification, orientation, and other social taboos. The revival, however, has been known to run afoul of liquor licensing and obscenity laws, thus raising free speech (as symbolic speech) issues which have led to successful litigation or changes in municipal policy distinguishing burlesque from other forms of "adult entertainment", as well as provided further fodder for satirical performances.

=== Burlesque scenes ===
There are modern burlesque performers, shows and festivals in many countries throughout the world as well as annual conventions such as the Miss Exotic World Pageant. Today's burlesque revival has found homes throughout the United States (with the largest communities located on its East and West Coasts) and in Canada, the United Kingdom, Australia, New Zealand, France, Germany and Japan. The revival has also occurred in New Orleans, Dallas, and Denver. Performances take place in various venues including theaters; as well as the burlesque dancers there are emcees to introduce them and stage kittens who act as stagehands.

== Boylesque ==
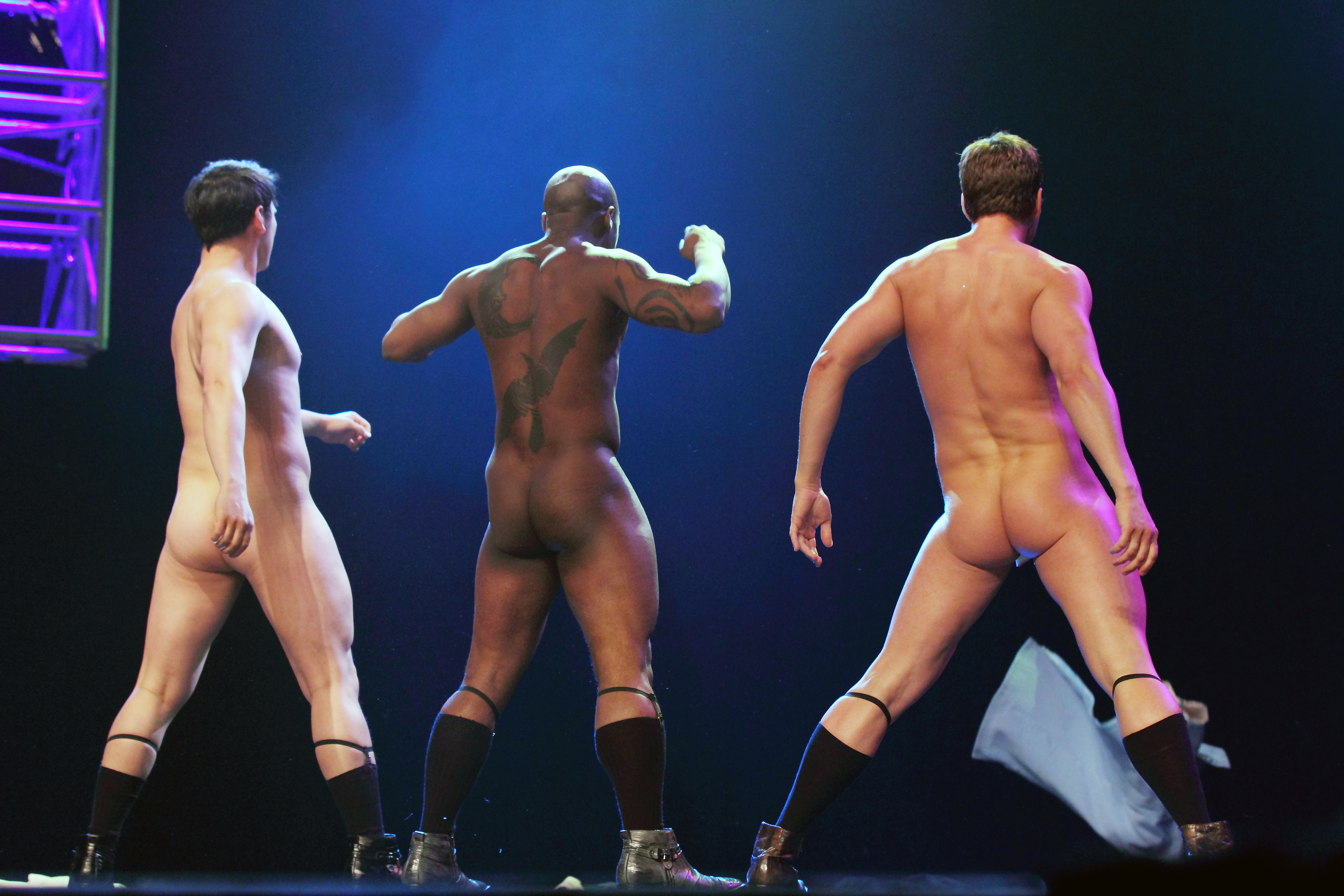
The "Stage Door Johnnies", Burlesque Hall of Fame, Las Vegas, 2011

Neo-burlesque shows that feature male-body roles have been dubbed as boylesque. The introduction of boylesque elements can be seen as a key difference between neo-burlesque and earlier, exclusively female-body forms of burlesque, which sometimes incorporated drag-queen roles (i.e. male impersonators of female bodies) but did not directly represent masculinity. Boylesque within the neo-burlesque scene can be traced back to the early 1980s with performers like John Sex.

As a result of the emergence of boylesque, transvestites also found a permanent place in the burlesque. While the struggle for emancipation, independence, self-confidence in body shape and demeanor was superficial for burlesque artists, the male part dealt with other issues. Burlesque artists from the LGBT scene (lesbian, gay, bisexual, and transgender) fought for equality and against the exclusion of HIV and people with AIDS. In the burlesque revues in New York was active for this purpose in the 1990s, including the Broadway Bears bar on Broadway. Millions of dollars have been donated to the aid organization Broadway Cares / Equity Fights AIDS (BCEFA). By changing gender roles this decade, boylesque artists, like burlesque artists, wanted to be independent.

There are annual boylesque festivals in New York, Seattle, and New Orleans, produced by Jen Gapay and Daniel Nardicio.

== Neo-burlesque organizations ==
- Burlesque Hall of Fame (formerly the Exotic World Burlesque Museum), which hosts the annual Miss Exotic World Pageant.
- Coney Island USA

== See also ==
- Behind the Burly Q, a 2010 documentary about the golden age of burlesque.
