= American burlesque =

Genre of variety show

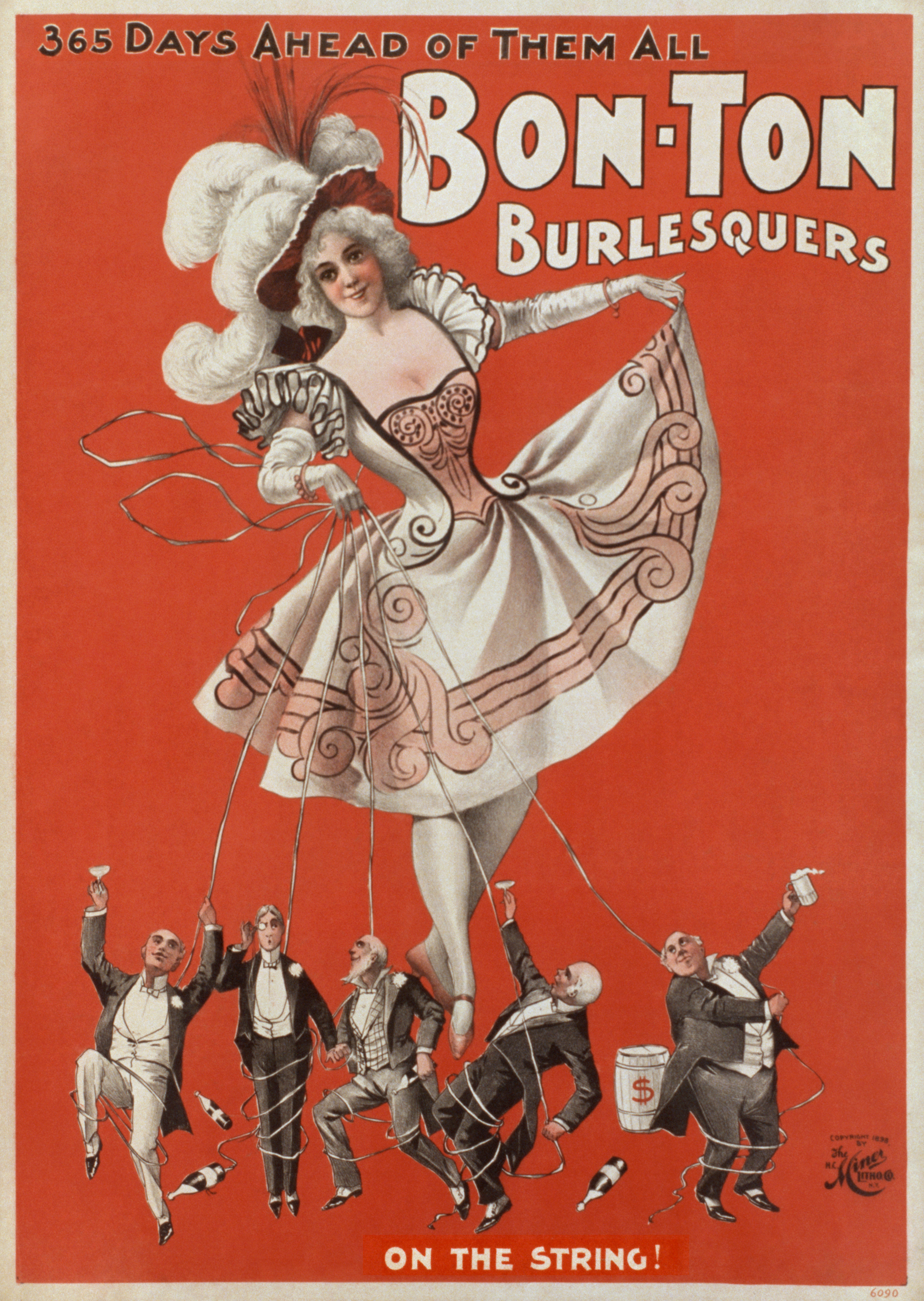
Advertisement for a burlesque troupe, 1898

Souvenir programme for Ruy Blas and the Blasé Roué

American burlesque or burlesque (Note: Also spelled burlesk.) is a genre of variety show derived from elements of Victorian burlesque, music hall, and minstrel shows. Burlesque became popular in the United States in the late 1860s and slowly evolved to feature ribald comedy and female nudity. By the late 1920s, the striptease element overshadowed the comedy and subjected burlesque to extensive local legislation. Burlesque gradually lost its popularity, beginning in the 1940s. A number of producers sought to capitalize on nostalgia for the entertainment by recreating burlesque on the stage and in Hollywood films from the 1930s to the 1960s. There has been a resurgence of interest in this format since the 1990s.

== Literary and theatrical origins ==
The term "burlesque" more generally means a literary, dramatic or musical work intended to cause laughter by caricaturing the manner or spirit of serious works, or by ludicrous treatment of their subjects. Burlesque in literature and in theatre through the 19th century was intentionally ridiculous in that it imitated several styles and combined imitations of certain authors and artists with absurd descriptions. Burlesque depended on the reader's (or listener's) knowledge of the subject to make its intended effect, and a high degree of literacy was taken for granted.

Victorian burlesque, sometimes known as "travesty" or "extravaganza", was popular in London theatres between the 1830s and the 1890s. It took the form of musical theatre parody in which a well-known opera, play or ballet was adapted into a broad comic play, usually a musical play, often risqué in style, mocking the theatrical and musical conventions and styles of the original work, and quoting or pastiching text or music from the original work. The comedy often stemmed from the incongruity and absurdity of the classical subjects, with realistic historical dress and settings, being juxtaposed with the modern activities portrayed by the actors. The dialogue was generally written in rhyming couplets, liberally peppered with bad puns. A typical example from a burlesque of Macbeth: Macbeth and Banquo enter under an umbrella, and the witches greet them with "Hail! hail! hail!" Macbeth asks Banquo, "What mean these salutations, noble thane?" and is told, "These showers of 'Hail' anticipate your 'reign'". A staple of theatrical burlesque was the display of attractive women in travesty roles, dressed in tights to show off their legs, but the plays themselves were seldom more than modestly risqué.

== History ==
=== 19th century ===
There were three main influences on American burlesque in its early years: Victorian burlesque, "leg shows" and minstrel shows. British-style burlesques had been successfully presented in New York as early as the 1840s.

"The present school of burlesque originated with Lydia Thompson" - New York Clipper, 12 September 1914

Burlesque in the United States is believed to have begun in New York with the arrival from England of Lydia Thompson's burlesque troupe, "The British Blondes". It was the most popular entertainment in New York during the 1868–1869 theatrical season: "The eccentricities of pantomime and burlesque – with their curious combination of comedy, parody, satire, improvisation, song and dance, variety acts, cross-dressing, extravagant stage effects, risqué jokes and saucy costumes – while familiar enough to British audiences, took New York by storm." Unfortunately, “the female audiences for burlesque did not last for long. In the summer of 1869 a wave of ‘anti-burlesque hysteria’ in the New York press frightened away the middle-class audiences ... and sent the Thompson troupe prematurely packing for a national tour”. After this untimely closure, backlash against burlesque continued to grow. Thompson's shows were described as a “disgraceful spectacle of padded legs jiggling and wriggling in the insensate follies and indecencies of the hour”. The New York Times consistently expressed its disgust of burlesque, even headlining an article with the plea “Exit British Burlesque”.

"Leg" shows, such as the musical extravaganza The Black Crook (1866), became popular around the same time. The influence of the minstrel show soon followed; one of the first American burlesque troupes was the Rentz-Santley Novelty and Burlesque Company, created in 1870 by Michael B. Leavitt, who had earlier feminized the minstrel show with his group Madame Rentz's Female Minstrels. American burlesque rapidly adopted the minstrel show's tripartite structure: part one was composed of songs and dances rendered by a female company, interspersed with low comedy from male comedians. Part two featured various short specialties and olios in which the women did not appear. The show's finish was a grand finale. Sometimes the entertainment was followed by a boxing or wrestling match.

By the 1880s, the four distinguishing characteristics of American burlesque had evolved:

- Minimal costuming, often focusing on the female form.
- Sexually suggestive dialogue, dance, plot lines and staging.
- Quick-witted humor laced with puns, but lacking complexity.
- Short routines or sketches with minimal plot cohesion across a show.

‘From 1880 to 1890 burlesque gained considerably in popularity and had developed into a definite form of entertainment, with a first part, olio and afterpiece or burlesque. Most of the shows that were rated as burlesque shows between 1870 and 1880 were partly of the minstrel type, and many contained casts entirely composed of women. Among the shows organized from 1880 to 1890 were the Ida Siddon’s Female Mastodons & Burlesque Co.—Sam T. Jack’s “Lily Clay’s" Adamless Eden Gaiety Co.—Lillie Hall’s Burlesquers—Madame Girard Gyer’s English Novelty Co.—Bob Manchester’s “Night Owls"—May Howard’s Co. (managed by Harry Morris, her husband and Tom Miaco)—the “City Club,” organized by the same managers—Sam T. Jack’s “Creole Burlesquers,” an all-negro show—Fay Foster Co., organized by Joe Oppenheimer—Rose Hill English Folly Co., managed by George W. Rice and Charles Barton—Weber and Fields’ Vaudeville Club—John S. Grieves’ Burlesquers—Boom’s “Model Burlesquers,”—“Parisian Folly”—and John H. Smiths’ “Henry Burlesquers,” in which McIntyre and Heath appeared.’

=== 1900–1920 ===
Burlesque in the first two decades of the 20th century was dominated by the Columbia Amusement Company. Also known as the Columbia Wheel, it produced over three dozen touring shows each year that rotated through an equal number of affiliated theaters. Columbia crushed smaller circuits or bought them outright, and organized a subsidiary circuit, the American Wheel, which played less prominent theaters and didn't censor performers as strictly as the main wheel. Before World War I, Columbia burlesque was generally family-friendly. Performers included Bert Lahr, Fannie Brice, and Bobby Clark, Leon Errol, and Jay C. Flippen, all of whom eventually left burlesque for Broadway musical comedies and revues.

=== 1920–1930 ===
Columbia's American Wheel subsidiary went bankrupt in 1922, but some of its executives and producers formed a new, independent circuit, Mutual, that took inspiration from contemporary Broadway revues like Earl Carroll's Vanities and the Ziegfeld Follies. Many performers and producers abandoned Columbia, which was seen as old-fashioned and in decline. At its peak, Mutual sent up to 50 shows on the road each year to cycle through as many affiliated theaters. Mutual's shows were more risque than Columbia's, but not as racy as shows mounted by local stock burlesque theaters such as the Minskys at the National Winter Garden on the Lower East Side. The popular burlesque show of this period eventually evolved to include striptease, which became the dominant ingredient of burlesque by the mid 1920s. The transition from traditional burlesque to striptease is depicted in the film The Night They Raided Minsky's (1968). Several performers claimed or have been given credit for being the first stripteaser. Comedians Bud Abbott, Lou Costello (not yet a team), Harry Steppe, Joe Penner, Billy Gilbert, and Rags Ragland, as well as stripteasers Ann Corio, Hinda Wausau, and Gypsy Rose Lee performed in Mutual shows.

=== 1930s and decline ===
Mutual collapsed in 1931 during the Great Depression. As legitimate Broadway shows closed, stock burlesque impresarios like the Minskys expanded out of working class neighborhoods and into theaters in and around Times Square. Stock burlesque companies multiplied in other cities and snatched up former Mutual talent. By the late 1930s, shows had changed from ribald ensemble performances of skits and musical numbers to a succession of solo stripteasers. Clergy, anti-vice factions and local businesses urged crack downs on burlesque, which began its downfall. In New York, Mayor Fiorello LaGuardia clamped down on burlesque beginning in 1937 and effectively put it out of business by the early 1940s. Burlesque lingered on elsewhere in the U.S., increasingly neglected, and by the 1970s, with nudity commonplace in theatres, American burlesque reached "its final shabby demise".

== Burlesque performances ==
Burlesque performances originally included comic sketches lampooning authority, the upper classes and high art, such as opera, Shakespearean drama, and classical ballet. The genre developed alongside vaudeville and ran on competing circuits. Possibly due to historical social tensions between the upper classes and lower classes of society, much of the humor and entertainment of later American burlesque focused on lowbrow and ribald subjects. In 1937, Epes W. Sargent wrote in Variety that, "Burlesque is elastic; more so, perhaps, than any other form in theatrical entertainment", meaning that burlesque performers didn't need to perform in a certain way. The performers could structure their show how they wanted.

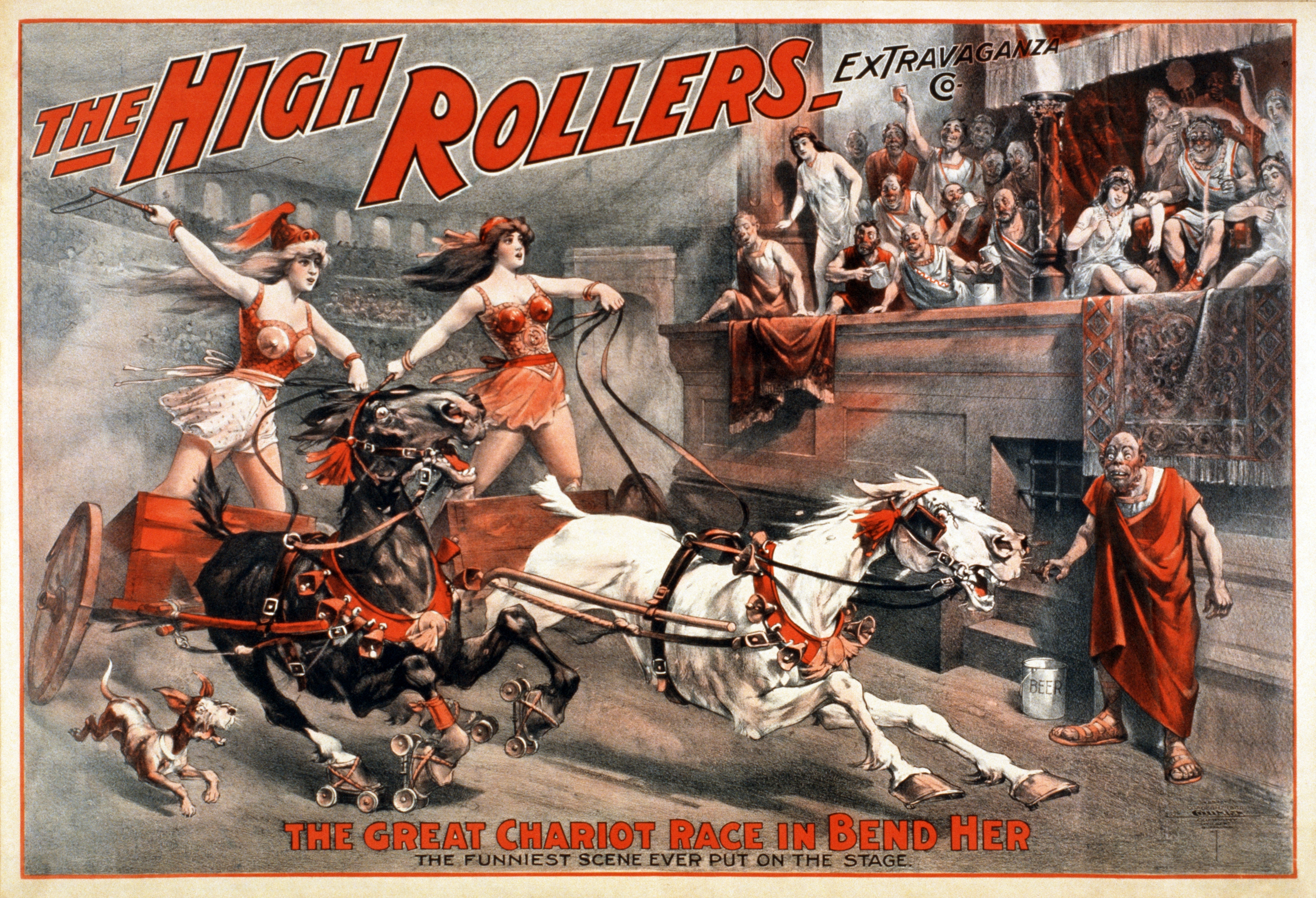
American burlesque on Ben Hur, c. 1900

Charlie Chaplin (who starred in the 1915 film Burlesque on Carmen) noted that in 1910: "Chicago ... had a fierce pioneer gaiety that enlivened the senses, yet underlying it throbbed masculine loneliness. Counteracting this somatic ailment was a national distraction known as the burlesque show, consisting of a coterie of rough-and-tumble comedians supported by twenty or more chorus girls. Some were pretty, others shopworn. Some of the comedians were funny, most of the shows were smutty harem comedies – coarse and cynical affairs".

== Burlesque on film ==
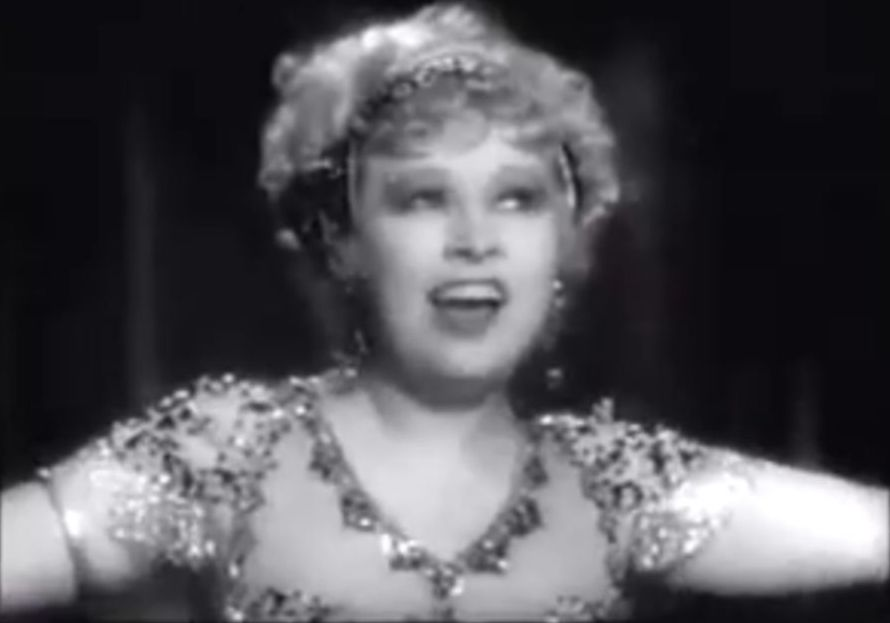
Mae West performing her burlesque dance in the film I'm No Angel

Burlesque shows have been depicted in numerous dramatic films, starting with Applause, a 1929 black-and-white backstage musical talkie directed by Rouben Mamoulian. Others include King of Burlesque (1936), starring Warner Baxter; Lady of Burlesque (1943) starring Barbara Stanwyck; Delightfully Dangerous (1945) starring Constance Moore; Two Sisters from Boston (1946), starring Kathryn Grayson; Queen of Burlesque (1946), starring Evelyn Ankers; Linda, Be Good (1947), starring Elyse Knox; and She's Working Her Way Through College (1952), starring Virginia Mayo. Gypsy (1962), starring Natalie Wood, and The Night They Raided Minsky's (1968), starring Jason Robards, depicted burlesque of the 1920s and 1930s. Other films that include burlesque characters include Ball of Fire, a 1941 screwball comedy starring Gary Cooper and Barbara Stanwyck. Additionally, many of the comedies of Bud Abbott and Lou Costello feature classic burlesque routines, such as "The Lemon Bit," "Crazy House," and "Slowly I Turned/Niagara Falls."

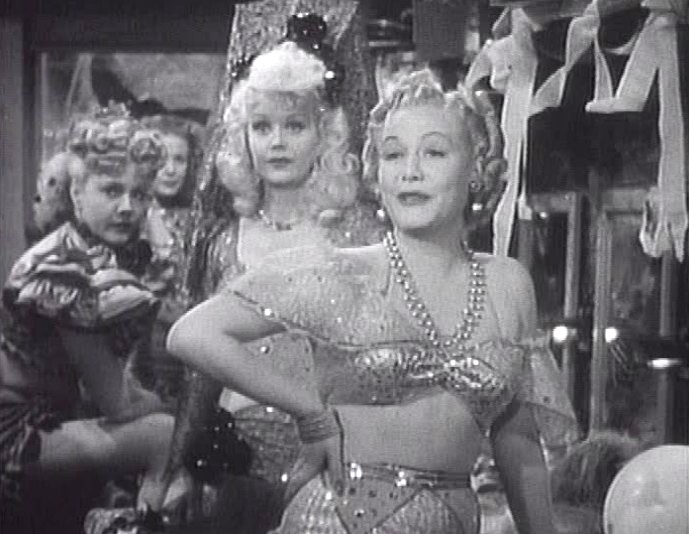
Marion Martin and Gloria Dickson in the film Lady of Burlesque

Enterprising low-budget producers transferred actual burlesque revues to film, beginning in 1946. The first was Hollywood Revels (1946), directed by future TV executive Duke Goldstone, where a standard burlesque show was staged in a theater and photographed from a distance.

Producer W. Merle Connell improved on Goldstone's template by staging the action in a movie studio, where he could control the camerawork, lighting, and sound, including close-ups and other studio photographic and editorial techniques. Connell began his burlesque series in 1947, doing business as Quality Pictures. At first Connell produced 10- and 20-minute short subjects for the home-movie market; these were printed in 16mm sound and 8mm silent versions. The format usually called for two lowbrow burlesque comedians, several showgirls, and a featured burlesque dancer. Tops in Burlesque headlined burlesque star Betty Rowland; Tomb It May Concern was a comedy sketch set in Egypt, with explorers discovering dancing girls among ancient tombs. These "for men only" attractions sold so well that Merle Connell began producing feature films for movie theaters. His 1951 production French Follies recreates a classic American burlesque presentation. In a time when some theater owners were desperate to lure audiences away from their television sets, these low-budget burlesque features were useful novelty attractions, and the format continued through the mid-1950s. Dream Follies (1954, filmed as Modern Follies) was written by the young comedian Lenny Bruce, who whimsically shared screen credit with ancient jokesmith Joe Miller!

Some figures from the 1950s indicate that burlesque films could cost upwards of $50,000 to produce, but Dan Sonney states that most only cost about $15,000 because they were shot quickly and often done in less than a day.

Burlesque films by burlesque impresario Lillian Hunt filmed at the Follies Theater in Los Angeles include Too Hot to Handle (1955), also known as Fig Leaf Frolics, Midnight Frolics (1949), Everybody's Girl (1951), Hollywood Peep Show (1953), Peek-A-Boo (1953), The A-B-C's of Love (1954), and Kiss Me Baby (1957).

Later, other producers entered the field, using color photography and even location work. Naughty New Orleans (1954) is an example of burlesque entertainment on film, equally showcasing girls and gags, although it shifts the venue from a burlesque-house stage to a popular nightclub. Photographer Irving Klaw filmed a very profitable series of burlesque features, usually featuring star pin-up girl Bettie Page and various lowbrow comedians (including future TV star Joe E. Ross). Page's most famous features are Striporama (1953), Varietease (1954) and Teaserama (1955). These films, as their titles imply, were only teasing the viewer: the girls wore revealing costumes, but there was never any nudity. In the late 1950s, however, provocative films emerged, sometimes using a "nudist colony" format, and the relatively tame burlesque-show film died out.

== Stage shows and revivals ==
A Broadway musical called Burlesque opened September 1, 1927 and ran until July 14, 1928. Top Banana, a musical with music and lyrics by Johnny Mercer and book by Hy Kraft and starring Phil Silvers premiered on Broadway in 1951. The original Broadway production of "Gypsy" opened on May 21, 1959 and closed on March 25, 1961 after 702 performances. In 1962, famed strip teaser Ann Corio put together a nostalgic off-Broadway show, This Was Burlesque, which she directed and in which also performed. (In 1968, she wrote a book with the same title.) Corio's show toured for almost two decades. In 1979, the Broadway musical Sugar Babies, recreated a Mutual-era show. A loose stage adaptation of The Night They Raided Minsky's, called Minsky's, opened on February 6, 2009, at the Ahmanson Theatre, Los Angeles, and ran three weeks. A 2013 play, The Nance, written by Douglas Carter Beane, focuses on a camp stock character in a 1930s burlesque troupe.

== Neo-Burlesque ==
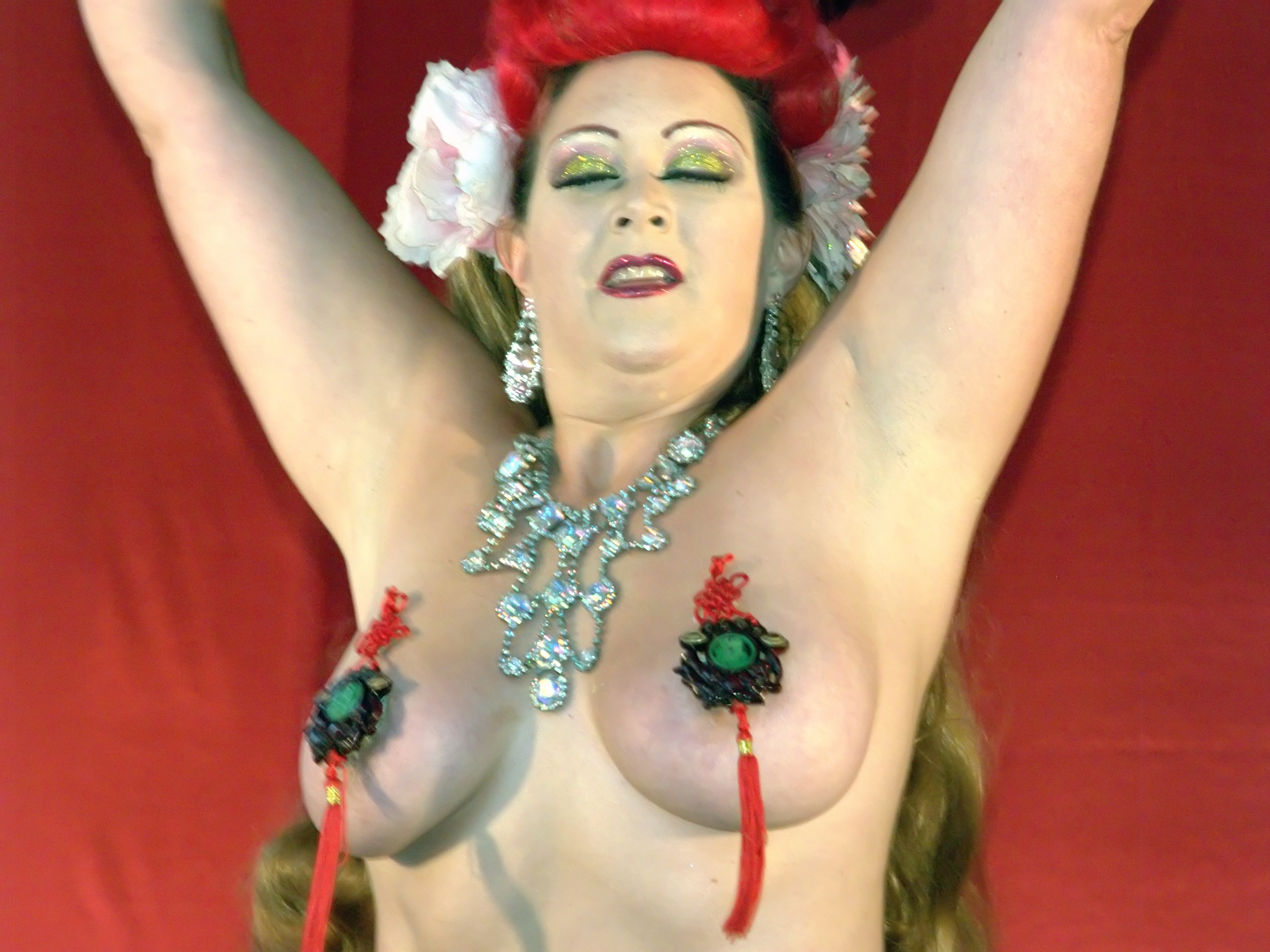
Miss Dirty Martini at the 2009 Howl Festival in New York

A new generation nostalgic for the spectacle and perceived glamour of the old times determined to bring burlesque back. This revival was pioneered independently in the early 1990s by Billie Madley's "Cinema" and later with Ami Goodheart in "Dutch Weismann's Follies" revues in New York, Michelle Carr's "The Velvet Hammer" troupe in Los Angeles, and The Shim-Shamettes in New Orleans. Ivan Kane's Royal Jelly Burlesque Nightclub at Revel Atlantic City opened in 2012. Inspired by old time stars like Sally Rand, Tempest Storm, Gypsy Rose Lee, and Lili St. Cyr, more recent performers include Dita Von Teese, Julie Atlas Muz, and Anne McDonald. Los Angeles-based troupe Little Miss Nasty has further expanded the neo-burlesque format by combining choreographed dance, theatrical performance, and burlesque with rock and heavy metal music. Agitprop groups such as Cabaret Red Light have included political satire and performance art in their acts.

Neo-Burlesque has taken many forms, but all have the common trait of honoring one or more of burlesque's previous incarnations, with acts including striptease, expensive costumes, bawdy humor, cabaret, and comedy/variety acts. Although neo-burlesque acts honor previous acts, they often lack elements of parody, and political commentary that was commonplace in traditional burlesque. There are modern burlesque performers and shows all over the world, and annual conventions such as the Vancouver International Burlesque Festival, the New York Burlesque Festival created by burlesque star Angie Pontani and Jen Gapay, and the Miss Exotic World Pageant are held. In 2008, The New York Times noted that burlesque had made a comeback in the city's art performance scene.

A 2010 musical film Burlesque, starring Christina Aguilera and Cher, attempted to capitalize on the burlesque revival. However, it received mixed reviews and a score of 37% on movie website Rotten Tomatoes. Critics found it "perversely tame" and "closer to your grandmother’s fan dance than to the neo-burlesque revues that began popping up in the early 1990s". Additionally, it "wags its derrière, in the direction of new burlesque, but it’s strictly old school ... with a story line that had already gathered dust by ... 1933."

=== Notable stars, writers, and agents ===
- Abbott and Costello
- Jack Albertson
- Robert Alda
- Morey Amsterdam
- Michael "Atters" Attree
- Candy Barr
- Irving Benson
- Milton Berle
- Immodesty Blaize
- Ben Blue
- Jac Bowie
- Fanny Brice
- Sherry Britton
- Red Buttons
- Jack Cameron
- Jack Carter
- Ann Corio
- Catherine D'lish
- Danny Dayton
- Gentry de Paris
- Jami Deadly
- Millie DeLeon
- Joe DeRita
- Phyllis Dixey
- Jimmy Durante
- Leon Errol
- Jade Esteban Estrada
- Mickey Faerch
- Joey Faye
- W. C. Fields
- Dwight Fiske
- Fanne Foxe
- Jackie Gleason
- John Grant
- Gilda Gray
- Jennie Lee
- Jo Weldon
- Dixie Evans
- Billy Hagan
- Margie Hart
- Bob Hope
- Al Jolson
- Bambi Jones
- Danny Kaye
- Bert Lahr
- Michelle L'amour
- Rose La Rose
- Pinky Lee
- Gypsy Rose Lee
- Al Lewis
- Lola the Vamp
- Jayne Mansfield
- Minsky Malone
- Missy Malone
- April March
- Pauline Markham
- Dirty Martini
- Tim Moore
- Chesty Morgan
- Julie Atlas Muz
- Kitten Natividad
- Olsen and Johnson
- Bettie Page
- Gloria Pall
- Angelique Pettyjohn
- Molly Picon
- Miss Polly Rae
- Angie Pontani
- Rags Ragland
- Sally Rand
- Alan Reed
- Liz Renay
- Benny Rubin
- Lili St. Cyr
- Satan's Angel
- Tura Satana
- Phil Silvers
- Red Skelton
- Arnold Stang
- Blaze Starr
- Tempest Storm
- Dita Von Teese
- Hinda Wausau
- Evelyn West
- Mae West
- Mollie Williams
- Joe Yule

== Notable burlesque festivals (selected) ==
- Helsinki Burlesque Festival, Helsinki, Finland
- Miss Exotic World, Las Vegas, U.S
- Moisture Festival, Seattle, U.S.
- New Orleans Burlesque Festival, Louisiana, U.S.
- New York Burlesque Festival, New York City, U.S.
- Vancouver International Burlesque Festival, Canada

== See also ==
- Beef Trust (burlesque)
- Behind the Burly Q, a 2010 documentary about the golden age of burlesque
- Burlesque Hall of Fame
- Minsky's
- Womanless wedding
