= Cook Opera House =

Theatre in Rochester, New York, United States

Coordinates: 43°9′22″N 77°36′32″W

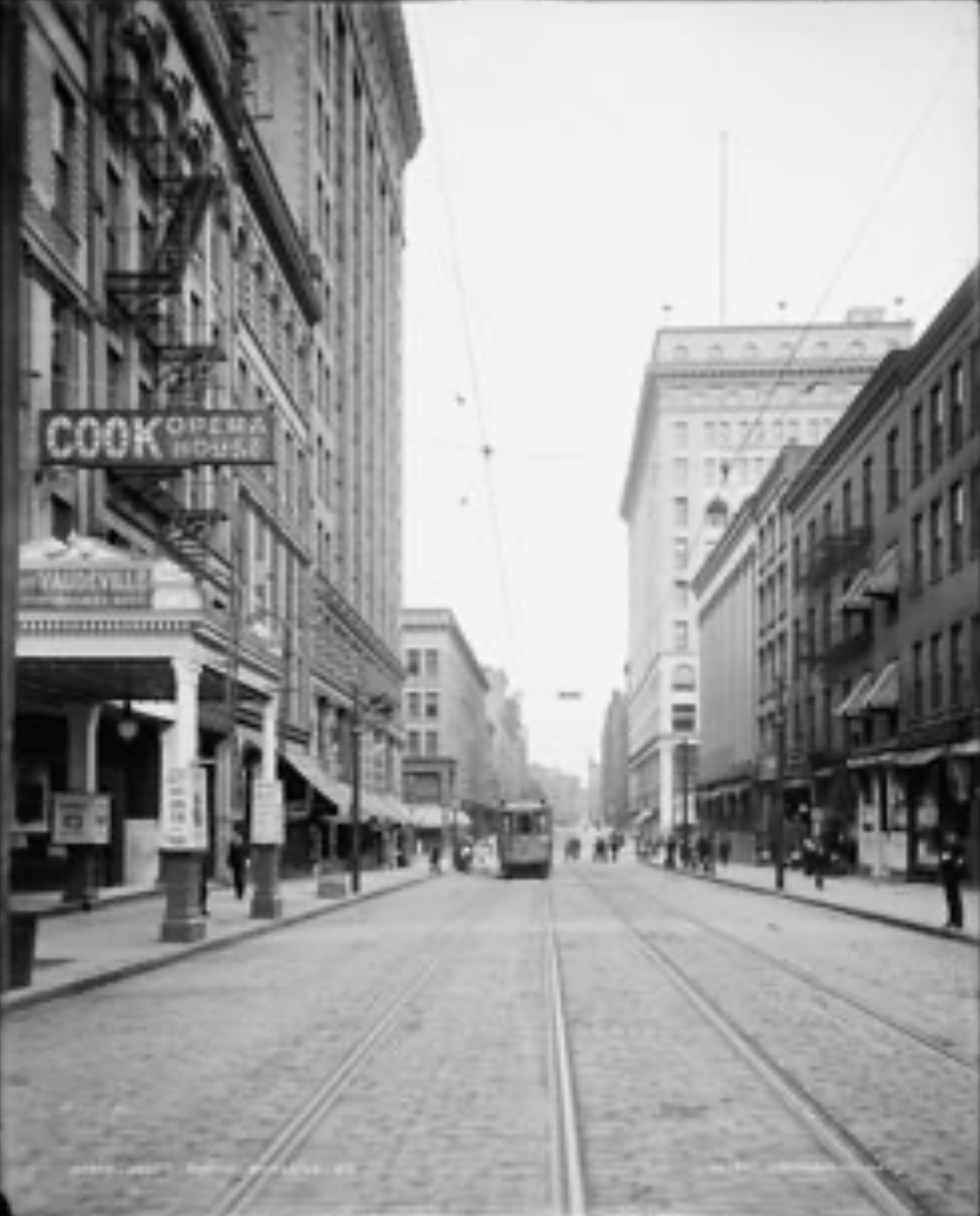
1904 photograph of South Ave. in Rochester, New York. On the left is the front facade of the Cook Opera House.

Cook Opera House was a theatre located at 25 South Ave between Main St and Broad St in Rochester, New York, United States. Designed by architect Leon H. Lempert, the theatre was built in 1891 and opened on January 14, 1892. It began as a legitimate theatre but evolved into Rochester's first major venue for vaudeville entertainments. Several well-known performers appeared at the theater, among them Sissieretta Jones, Jessie Bonstelle, Sarah Bernhardt, Al Jolson, Eddie Foy, Harry Houdini, and Will Rogers. In 1912 it was an American burlesque venue until it was purchased and renamed the Family Theater (Note: Sources spell the name of the venue inconsistently with the names Family Theater and Family Theatre both used in publications.) that same year. It was again a vaudeville venue and also a silent film cinema until 1924 when it became solely a movie theatre. In 1937 it became the Embassy Theatre, and began offering live performances of American burlesque in conjunction with film screenings. It became a venue for strippers and ribald comics. Its last performances before closing were given by the stripper Rose La Rose in 1952.

After May 1952 the theatre lay dormant. Attempts to demolish the theatre were prevented multiple times. In 1972 the theatre's roof collapsed, and in 1974 a fire badly damaged a large portion of the structure leading to the demolition of the auditorium portion of the venue. Attempts were made to save the façade of the theatre by Rochester's Preservation Board, who deemed what was left of the theatre as a historic landmark in 1977. That plan was opposed by Rochester's City Council and the City Planning Commission. The remaining portion of the theatre was demolished in early 1979.

== History ==
=== Cook Opera House ===
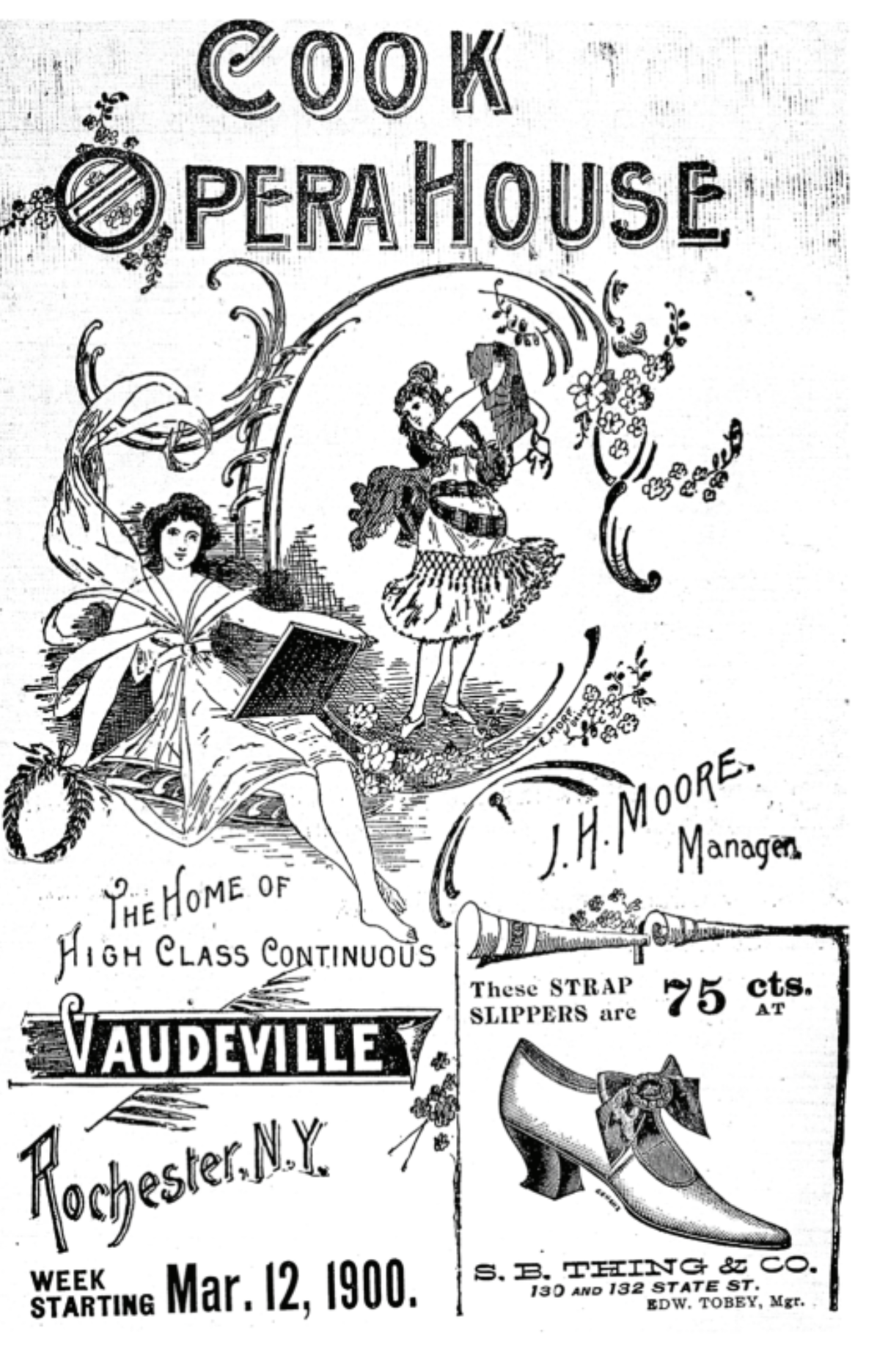
1900 advertisement for the Cook Opera House

The Cook Opera House (COH) was commissioned by owners Frederick Cook (namesake of the theatre and former Secretary of State of New York) and Jacob Gerling. The theatre was constructed on the former site of two earlier theaters which had both been destroyed by fires: the Metropolitan Theatre (opened 1848; burned 1869) and the Grand Opera House (burned 1891). The COH was designed by architect Leon H. Lempert. Adam Friederich & Sons were the masonry firm hired to build the theatre, and F. C. Seitz did the carpenter work. The interior of the theatre used terra cotta, cream, buff and salmon-colored decorations. It sat 1400 people with seats upholstered in red plush. The entrance of the theatre had gold and ivory finishings.

An amateur community opera organization was organized in Rochester in 1891 by H. S. Crabbe and Henry Greiner to prepare a group of operas with local singers to open the COH. The theatre opened on January 14, 1892, with a production of Friedrich von Flotow's Stradella. H. R. Jacobs was the first lessee of the theatre. Under his tenure theatre mainly presented light operas and touring productions. Both the Aborn Opera Company and Tony Pastor's theatre troupe played at the COH in 1895. Joseph Jefferson and his theatre troupe performed at the COH in May 1896, and Sissieretta Jones appeared at the theater in her show Black Patti's Fifty Troubadours the following September.

The COH was leased by J. W. Henocksburg with a young Sam S. Shubert as his booking manager beginning in May 1897. Sam co-managed the theatre for Henocksburg with his brother Jacob J. Shubert through end of June 1898. In July 1897 a stock theatre company managed by Robert Cummings was in residence at the theatre. In January 1898 Eugenie Blair starred in a production of East Lynne at the theatre, and the following month Edward Harrigan brought his play Old Lavender to the COH. In the summer of 1898 Jessie Bonstelle led the cast in a production of Ouida's Moths. On April 9, 1899, the 54th Regiment Band gave a benefit concert for Frederick Douglass at the COH. In the fall of 1899 the Biograph Company screened several early silent films at the COH, six of which featured Pope Leo XIII at the Gardens of Vatican City. In October 1900 Minnie Maddern Fiske starred in the title role of Langdon Mitchell's Becky Sharp at the COH. In 1903 Jessie Bonstelle starred in a production of The Little Minister at the COH. Other actors who starred in shows at the COH included Sarah Bernhardt, Al Jolson, and Jean Harlow.

While it began its life as a legitimate theatre, it became Rochester's first major venue for vaudeville, a shift in programming that occurred when James H. Moore took over the lease from Henocksburg in 1898. Henry E. Dixey of Adonis fame performed at the COH in 1904. On December 5, 1905 Harry Houdini appeared at the COH in a program in which he escaped from a straitjacket and a locked trunk. Some other well-known performers who appeared in vaudeville at the COH included Eddie Foy (1905), Rose Stahl (1905), the duo Cole and Johnson (1905), Van Alstyne and Henry (1906), Valerie Bergere (1906), Rose Coghlan (1907), Virginia Earle (1907), Corinne Kimball (1907), Walter C. Kelly (1907), Robert C. Hilliard (1908), Will Rogers (1908 and 1912), and Kate and May Elinore (1909).

In 1908 the COH was purchased by Forrest W. Taylor. In 1910 several plays were staged at the COH, including Barney Gilmore's The Irish Detective, Charles Klein's The Lion and the Mouse, and Clyde Fitch's Girls. In the early 1910s several burlesque entertainments were given at the theatre including The Gay Widows (1911), The Ducklings (1911), The High Life of the Girls of Beulah Beach (1911), and The Moulin Rogue Burlesquers (1912). Burlesque comedian Billy Hagan met his wife Anna at the COH while working at the theatre in 1912.

=== Family Theater ===
Cook's Opera House closed in September 1912, and its lease was advertised as for sale. It was acquired by Albert A. Fenyvessy, and re-branded as the Family Theater when it re-opened as a vaudeville venue on October 28, 1912. Vaudeville in conjunction with silent film screenings remained the standard repertoire at the theater up through 1924 when the live performances ceased and the venue became exclusively a movie theater. Fenyvessy's sons took over the management of the theater from their father. In October 1936 it was announced that Elias Moses Loew had taken over the lease of theatre from the Fenyvessy brothers, and that he was planning on demolishing the venue and replacing it with a new modern movie theatre. In December 1936 it was reported that theater was undergoing remodeling instead of demolition.

=== Embassy Theatre and demise ===
By June 1937 the Family Theater's was changed to the Embassy Theatre (ET). After years of no live performances, live entertainments as well as continued film screenings were being offered at the theatre under a new policy instituted in September 1937. The venue became an American burlesque theatre featuring strippers and ribald comics, a shift one writer attributed to the death of interest in vaudeville acts following a cultural shift after World War I. American men serving in France during the war were exposed to more risqué forms of entertainment, and when they returned to the United States the desire for burlesque strippers increased, leading to that type of entertainment supplanting vaudville.

In 1940 the manager of the ET was targeted by the authorities for the dirty jokes being told by the venue's comics and the nudity being displayed by its female burlesque acts. He lost his license for "permitting an indecent, immoral, and impure show and entertainment" in a public venue. The ET remained operational as late as May 1952 when exotic dancer Rose La Rose was the headline act. After this, the theatre lay dormant. The marquee of the theatre was taken down in August 1958. Plans to demolish the theatre were prevented after it was discovered that the theatre shared a common wall with a neighboring business. In 1962 the area around the theatre was barricaded as portions of the theatre were crumbling and hazardous to pedestrians. In 1972 the roof of the theatre collapsed. Douglas A. Fisher spearheaded an effort in the early 1970s to attempt to restore the theatre as part of his proposed Canaltown project that ultimately was not successful.

In 1974 a fire destroyed much of the building. The auditorium portion of the building was torn down as a result of the damage. A March 1976 investigation by city officials determined that the historic building was not salvageable and recommended that the city purchase the structure and demolish it. City announced plans to buy the theatre along with seven other nearby structures in December 1976 with the theatre marked for demolition. The city's preservation board voted to give Cooks Opera House landmark status in August 1977 putting demolition plans on hold. The Rochester City Council was angered by the landmark designation and threatened to reduce the power of the preservation board. Rochester's City Planning Commission rejected the Preservation Board's bid to save the opera house.

The theatre was demolished in early 1979.
