= Jett Adore =

American burlesque dancer

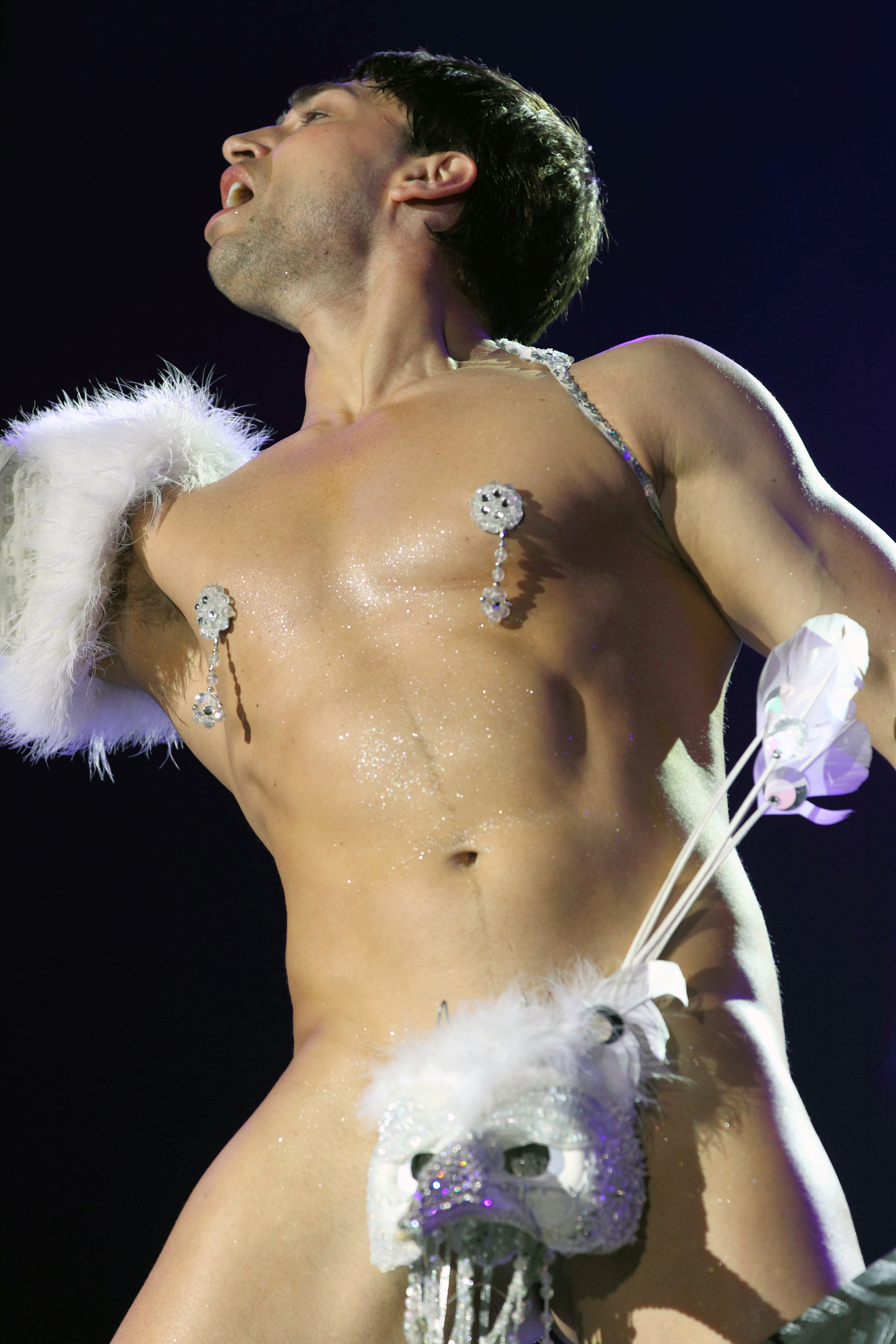
- Adore performing at the Burlesque Hall of Fame in 2011
- Occupation: Burlesque dancer
- Website: jettadore.com

Jett Adore is an American burlesque dancer. He has performed as part of Stage Door Johnnies, Chicago's only all-male burlesque troop. Due to his career success, Adore has been referred to as the Prince of Boylesque and is an inductee of the Burlesque Hall of Fame.

== Biography ==
Jett Adore has a degree in musical theater. Adore dances alongside Ray Gunn and Bazuka Joe in Stage Door Johnnies. The Stage Door Johnnies, founded in 2007, is the only all-male burlesque troop based in Chicago. In 2011 he performed at the New York Burlesque Festival. In 2013 Adore performed in La Divina Productions' show Hotter Then Hell Burlesque at the Kessler Theater in Dallas. In 2014 he was a performer at the Show Me Burlesque Festival in St. Louis, Missouri, the Texas Burlesque Festival, the Helsinki Burlesque Festival in Finland, and the Vienna Boylesque Festival in Austria. He performed the opening and closing acts at the 2014 New York Boylesque Festival. In 2016 he performed with Dita von Teese in her show Burlesque: Strip Strip Hooray Variety Show.

Adore has won numerous burlesque awards. In 2011 Stage Door Johnnies won Best Troupe at the Burlesque Hall of Fame weekend in Las Vegas. He was also awarded Most Innovative by the Burlesque Hall of Fame at the 2011 Tournament of Tease. In 2012 he won Best Duo alongside Frenchie Kiss at the tournament. In 2015 he opened his own show, Diamond Studs, in New York City.

Adore also teaches boylesque performance and technique, and hosts a master class called Exploring Masculinity.
