= What Katie Did (company) =

British lingerie design house

- Industry: Fashion
- Founded: 1999; 27 years ago
- Headquarters: London, England, United Kingdom
- Key people: Katie Thomas (née Halford); Richard Thomas
- Products: Lingerie
- Website: www.whatkatiedid.com

What Katie Did is a British lingerie design house founded in 1999 by Katie Thomas.

== History ==
In 1999, being unable to afford fully fashioned stockings, Thomas decided to invest £100 in nylons to sell at The London Fetish Fair. This led to Thomas creating her own website.

In 2002, What Katie Did's first reproduction of the Bullet bra was launched, the first to be produced in the country. The next year, the company opened a boutique in London Portobello. In 2010, Thomas was asked to advise on an bra of Marilyn Monroe that was put up for auction.

Thomas has also appeared advising on corsets on ABC's Nightline in 2012 and in the same year was nominated for Cosmopolitan's Businesswoman of the Year.

== Style ==
The brand recreates designs from the 1950s including the bullet bra, which has been worn by celebrities such as Madonna and Rihanna. What Katie Did are also known for their steel boned corsets.

=== Models ===
Models for the company include Bernie Dexter, Missy Malone, Jami Deadly and Miss Polly Rae.
