= DeLeon =

DeLeon or De Leon may refer to:

- DeLeon (surname)
- Deleon Richards (b. 1976), US female gospel singer
- DeLeon (band)
- 17934 Deleon, a main-belt asteroid discovered in 1999
- DeLeon Springs, Florida, a census-designated place in the US state of Florida
- De Leon, Texas, a city in the US state of Texas
- DeLeón Tequila
- Daryl DeLeon, a Filipino-British racing driver racing in the British Touring Car Championship.
