= New York Burlesque Festival =

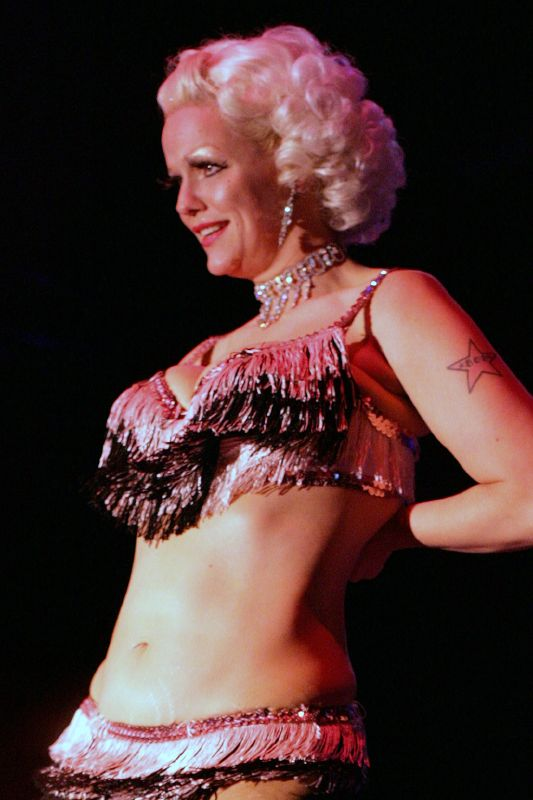
- The World Famous *BOB*, Miss Exotic World 2006
- Status: Active
- Genre: Festivals
- Date: October 9-12, 2025
- Frequency: Annually
- Location: New York. NY US
- Founder: Jen Gapay; The World Famous Pontani Sisters
- Website: thenewyorkburlesquefestival.com

The New York Burlesque Festival is an annual four-day event that takes place in New York City each fall, where performers from all over the world appear on stages for musical acts, burlesque shows, and other performances.

== History ==
The festival premiered in 2003 and was founded by Jen Gapay of Thirsty Girl Productions along with Angie Pontani, Tara Pontani and Helen Pontani of The World Famous Pontani Sisters. Actress and burlesque artist Pearls Daily has been on the Production Team as Volunteer Coordinator since 2016, in addition to performing as part of the event.

== Festival venues and performers ==
The festival features over 100 burlesque and variety performers from around the world, making it one of the largest international burlesque events. Burlesque is attended by featured performers in addition to live music, comedy and variety.

=== Venues ===
The four nights of the festival take place at various venues throughout Manhattan and Brooklyn. In addition to live performances, all shows feature interactive elements where patrons get burlesque makeovers or purchase paraphernalia such as pasties, costumes and corsets.

Venues for the festival include B.B. King Blues Club in Times Square, the Highline Ballroom, Brooklyn Bowl and The Bell House. Previous venues have included Le Poisson Rouge, The Maritime Hotel, The Limelight and the Supper Club.

=== Performers ===
Performers have included the following names:

- Dirty Martini
- Jo Weldon
- Jett Adore
- Jonny Porkpie
- Julie Atlas Muz
- Murray Hill
- Nasty Canasta
- Pearls Daily
- The World Famous *BOB*

== See also ==
- Burlesque
- American burlesque
- The World Famous Pontani Sisters
- List of Burlesque festivals
