= Toni Elling =

Burlesque dancer (1928–2023)

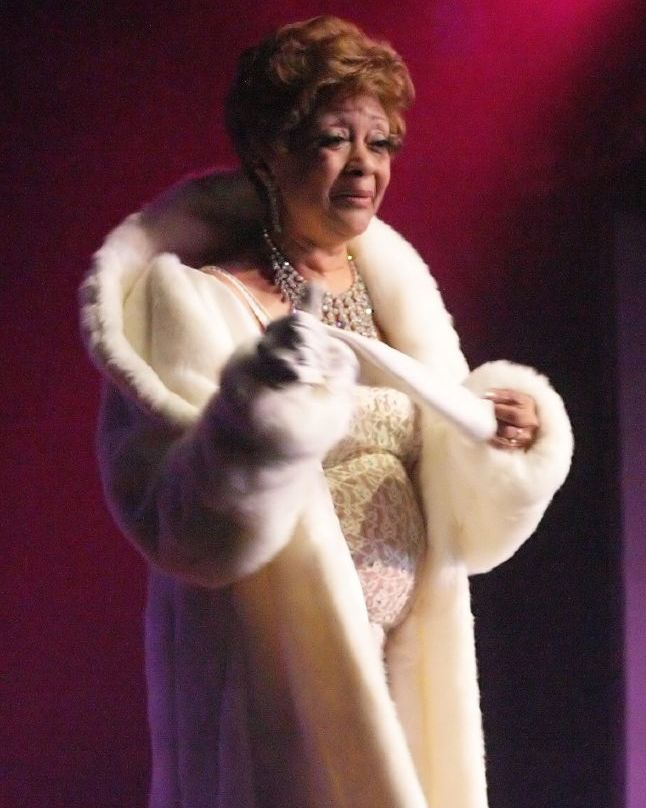
- Performing at Miss Exotic World Pageant, 2007
- Born: Rosita Sims; May 13, 1928; Detroit, Michigan, U.S.
- Died: April 2, 2023 (aged 94); Detroit, Michigan, U.S.
- Occupations: Dancer, entertainer
- Years active: 1960–1974

Toni Elling (born Rosita Sims, May 13, 1928 – April 2, 2023), also known by her stage name Satin Doll, was an American burlesque dancer.

Elling was born in Detroit to Joseph and Myrtle Sims, the eldest of three children.

Elling was unhappy with her job as a telephone operator at the Michigan Bell telephone company where she had worked for nine years, because she could not get promoted because she was an African American.

She got into burlesque dancing in 1960 when she was 32 years old after a friend suggested she get into stripping, and continued performing until the early 1970s. She married but she soon divorced, as her husband was abusive. They had no children. She took her stage name Satin Doll from her friend and confidant, bandleader Duke Ellington.

Some years into her dancing career, Elling asked if Duke Ellington could write her a song. Ellington responded that he has already done that and the song was called "Satin Doll. The song Satin Doll later became the song that Elling stripped too.

Elling was also friends with Sammy Davis Jr. and fighter Joe Louis. Elling took pride in never taking off her panties in her act or wearing a G-string and said "It's entertainment, yes, but the idea is to suggest what’s there, not throw off all your clothes and reveal everything. That’s why they call it strip-tease."

Elling is referenced in a comedy routine by Richard Pryor in the 1982 concert film Richard Pryor: Live on the Sunset Strip when he was the emcee at a mafia controlled nightclub in Youngstown, Ohio, that they both worked at circa 1960. While Pryor correctly gave his own age of 19, he mistakenly claimed she was 60 at the time of their association, when she was really only 32.

The 1986 Richard Pryor directed film Jo Jo Dancer, Your Life Is Calling featured a stripper character named Satin Doll.

Elling retired in 1974. In 2014 she was inducted into the Burlesque Hall of Fame in Las Vegas.

Elling died on April 2, 2023, at the age of 94 in Detroit.

== Minnette "Satin Doll" Wilson ==
There was also another dancer and Milwaukee lounge owner who went by the performer name Satin Doll, Minnette Wilson, who died in 2017.

Wilson's Milwaukee establishment was known as Satin Doll's Lounge.
