= DeLeon (surname) =

DeLeon or De Leon is a surname. Notable people with the surname include:

- Alexander DeLeon (born 1989), US musician
- Count de Leon (1788–1834), German alchemist and mystic, born Bernhard Müller
- Carlos De León (1959–2020), Puerto Rico-born US athlete in boxing
- Daniel De Leon (1856–1914), US political activist and newspaper editor
- Daryl DeLeon (born 2005), Filipino-British racing driver
- Edwin de Leon (1818–1891), US lawyer and newspaper editor
- Gloria DeLeon (born 1952), US social worker
- Idalis DeLeón (born 1966), US singer and television personality
- Jack DeLeon (1924–2006), US television actor
- José DeLeón (born 1960), Dominican Republic-born US athlete in baseball
- Kevin de León (born 1966), US politician
- Leroy DeLeon (1948–2025), Trinidad and Tobago footballer
- Luis DeLeón (born 1958), Puerto Rico-born US athlete in baseball
- Millie DeLeon (1873–1922), US stage performer
- Nick DeLeon (born 1990), US football player
- Oscar D'León (born 1943), Venezuelan musician
- Rafael de Leon (1908–1999), Trinidad & Tobago musician, known as Roaring Lion
- Ronnie Deleon (fl. 1980s – 1990s), US kickboxer
- Russ DeLeon (born 1965), US attorney and co-founder of PartyGaming
- Skylar Deleon (born 1979), US actor convicted of a 2004 murder
- Walter DeLeon (1884–1947), US screenwriter
