= Angie Pontani =

American dancer, choreographer, producer, and blogger

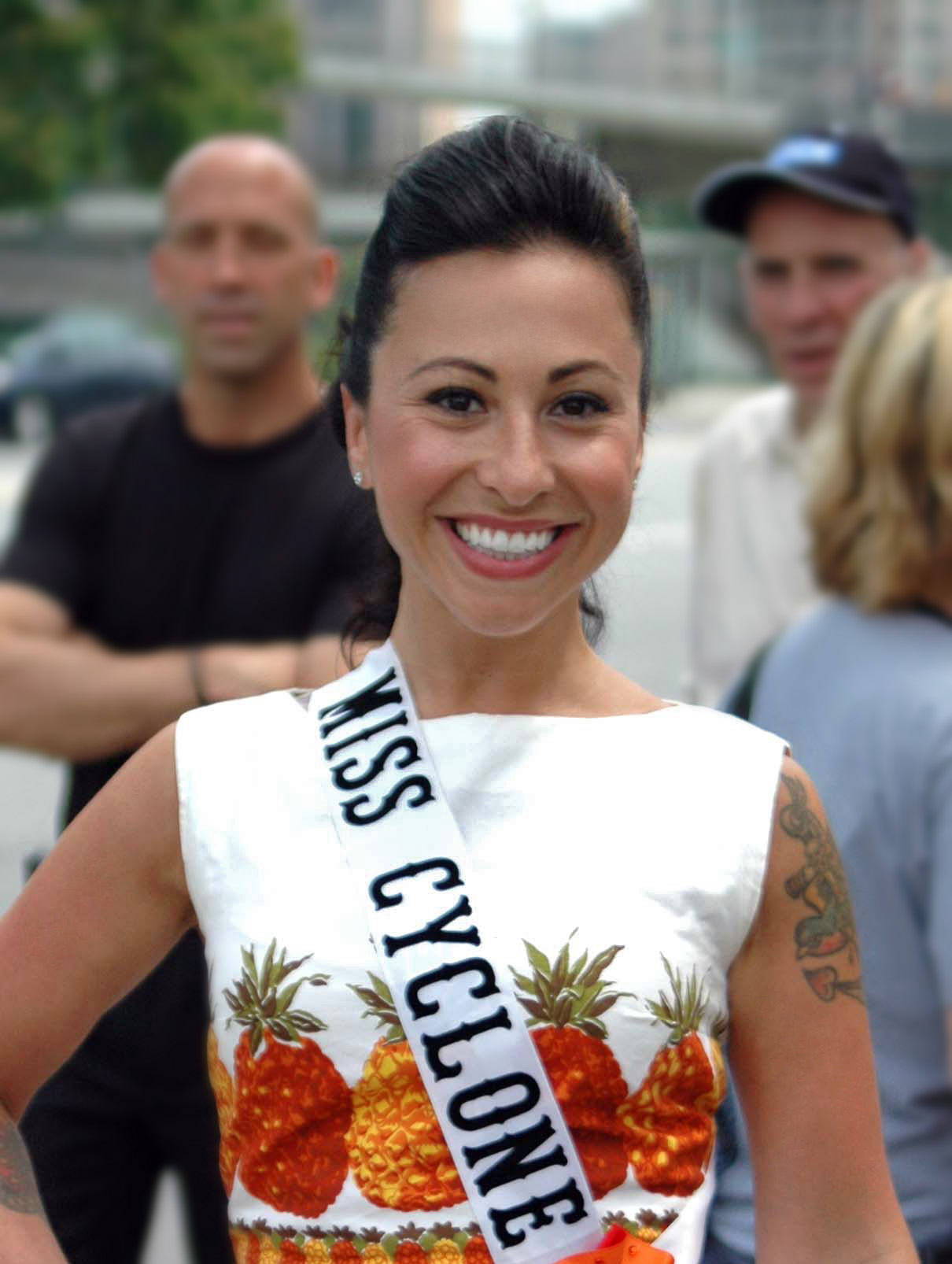
- Pontani at the Coney Island Cyclone's 82nd birthday celebration in 2009
- Born: Trenton, New Jersey
- Occupations: Burlesque dancer, choreographer, producer, and costumer
- Spouse: Brian Newman
- Children: 1
- Website: www.angiepontani.com

Angie Pontani (born 6 November 1976) is a contemporary burlesque dancer, choreographer, producer, and blogger based in Brooklyn, New York. She was crowned Miss Exotic World in 2008.

== Biography ==
Andrea Louisa Pontani is originally from Trenton, New Jersey. In the mid-1990s she began her career in New York City dancing in the Dutch Weismann Follies at age 17. After the close of Dutch Weismanns, Angie went on to launch the World Famous Pontani Sisters, who performed regularly at Marion's Continental and Windows on the World in the World Trade Center. In 2006, Angie started to focus on her solo performances.

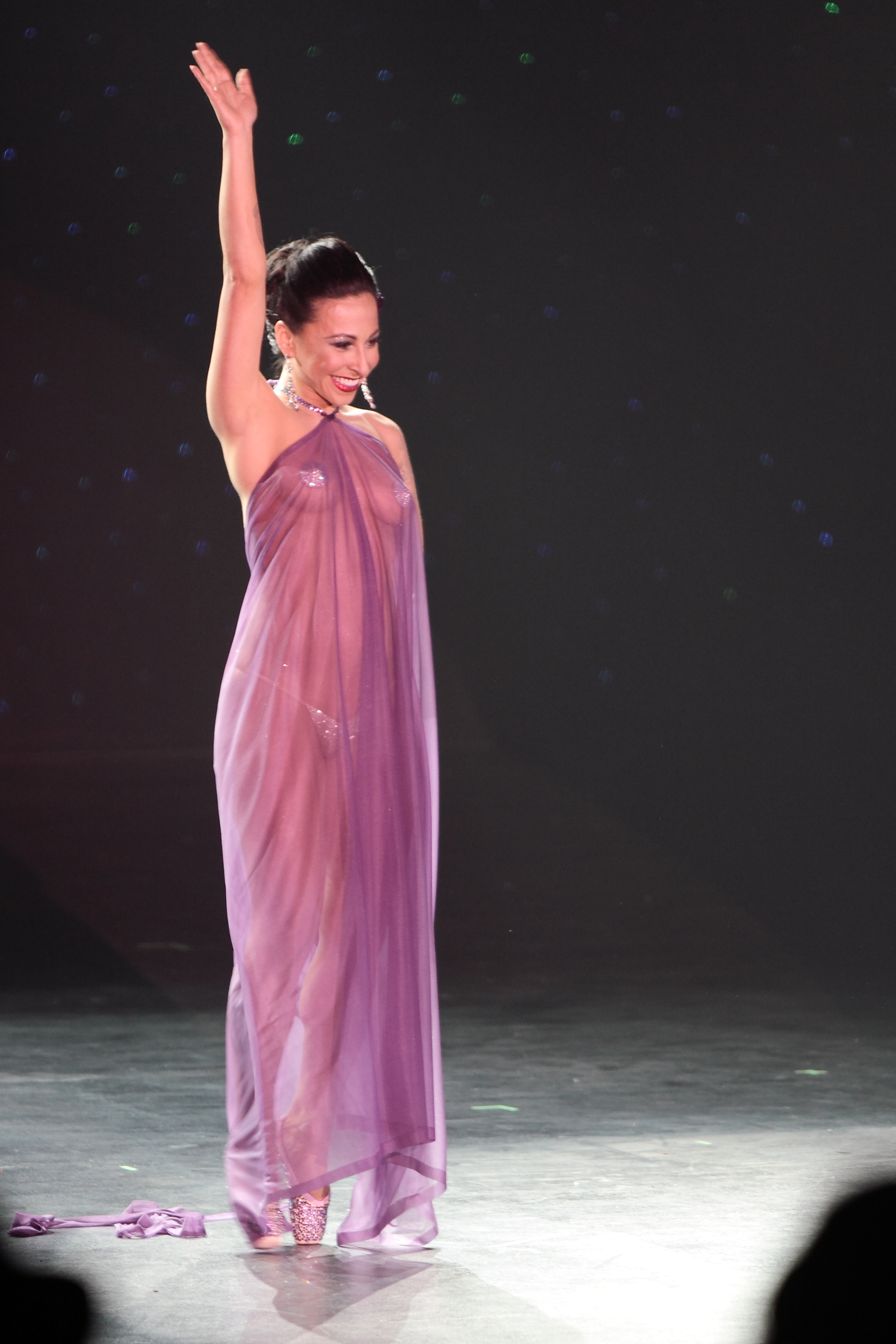
Angie Pontani at Miss Exotic World 2009

Pontani was the co-producer and star of This Is Burlesque at the now-defunct Corio Supper Club. She performs around the world solo and with the Pontani Sisters, and was a creator of the DVD series, Go-Go Robics and Go-Go Dance with Angie Pontani produced by World Dance New York. Angie produces and stars in the Burlesque-A-Pades touring production and is the co-producer of the New York Burlesque Festival, an event that happens annually and brings together hundreds of burlesque performers from around the world for four nights of performance. Angie has modeled for several designers, including Mode Merr Clothing as well as Dirty Dolls Lingerie and has shot with renowned photographers like Ellen von Unwerth, Josh Gosfield and Brian Smith. Pontani hosts Ed The Pontani Pages, a monthly talk show format podcast produced by JL Aronson in NYC. She also hosted “The Bump n Grind” Podcast 2020-2021, produced by Tenderloins, it focused on burlesque and is available on all streaming platforms. In 2015, she was featured in a photo shoot for CR Fashion Book nude at seven-months pregnant, alongside Lady Gaga shot by Bruce Weber.

Angie was crowned Miss Cyclone in 2007 in honor of the historic roller coaster the Coney Island Cyclone. As a Coney Island resident, she has been very active in the fight to save them from rezoning that would jeopardize the amusement district. Angie was crowned "The Reigning Queen of Burlesque, the winner of the Miss Exotic World Pageant in 2008" at the Burlesque Hall of Fame reunion at the Palms Hotel in Las Vegas. Other awards include, "The Best Body in Burlesque" - 2007 New York Burlesque Festival, "#1 Burlesque Attraction in the Nation" - AOL.com, "Best NY Based Dance Company" - Show Business, "Hottest Burlesque Troupe" - Village Voice. She was recently featured on the PBS Great Performances series with Lady Gaga and Tony Bennett for their release of Cheek to Cheek and has collaborated with retailer Secrets in Lace to release a collection of vintage inspired dresses. She has performed burlesque at the Dolby Theater in Las Vegas as part of Lady GaGa’s Jazz and Piano residency in 2023.

On February 16, 2013, Angie Pontani married band leader, trumpet player and vocalist Brian Newman in Brooklyn, New York. They have one child together, a daughter Sistilia Josephine Pontani Newman, born on September 9, 2015.

In January 2017, Angie started a blog which features family recipes and Italian inspired dishes, some of which were featured in Rachael Ray's magazine's "How To Live Like an Italian" issue.

Angie Pontani appeared in the documentary Gaga: Five Foot Two, at the time of the baptism of her daughter, in which Lady Gaga was chosen to be the godmother.

Pontani co-produces and stars in Brian Newman After Dark which has residencies in NYC & Las Vegas.

== The Pontani Sisters ==
The World Famous Pontani Sisters are a highly stylized and costumed dance trio that helped to pioneer the burlesque revival. They began performing on the boardwalk in Coney Island and went on to international tours both alone as well as with the band Los Straitjackets. Angie choreographed, costumed, and booked most of the troupe's performances, including tours, Las Vegas runs and appearances on national television programs like Late Night with Conan O'Brien as well as Gossip Girl. The Pontani Sisters have released three DVDs that teach 1960s go-go dancing, Go-Go Robics I & II and Twist Party, with the surf band, Los Straitjackets.

== Television, film and radio appearances ==
Year	Appearance	Role	Notes
2004	Showy and 5 Foor 2: The World Famous Pontani Sisters	Herself	
2006	Queer Eye For the Straight Guy	Herself	"Surprise Our Stud with Stag Party: Ryan M" episode
2006	The World Famous Pontani Sisters	Herself	http://www.micropunta.it/
2008	Gossip Girl	Burlesque dancer	https://web.archive.org/web/20081006072722/http://www.alarmpress.com/1656/columns/weekly-burlesque-gossip-girl/
2008	The Poor Man's Follies	Herself	http://www.micropunta.it/
2008	Time "The 2008 Burlesque Festival"	Herself	
2009	Michael Imperioli's The Hungry Ghosts	Appears painted gold	http://www.thehungryghostsmovie.com/
2010	Dirty Martini and the New Burlesque	Herself	
2010	The 50 Cent Project	Herself	MTV, US
2010	Burlesque Mania	Herself	Sky TV, Italy
	Nightline		TV3, New Zealand
	Late Night with Conan O'Brien	Herself	
	Good Morning America	Herself	
	The Today Show	Herself	
	The List	Herself	
	Start Ups	Herself	
	The Wise Guy Show	Herself	
	A Day in the Life	Herself	NPR
	The Stretch Show	Herself	Maxim Radio
2013	Driving Jersey	Herself	NJTV, US
2014	Cheek to Cheek with Lady Gaga and Tony Bennett	Herself	PBS, US
