= Womanless wedding =

Comic all-male performance of a wedding

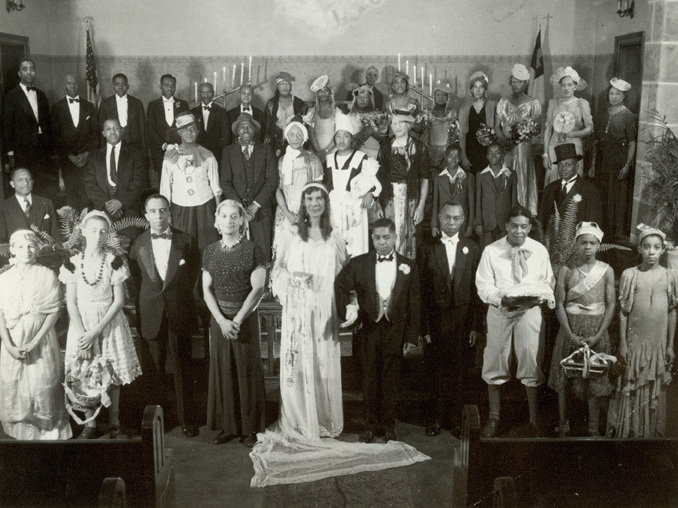
A womanless wedding taking place at a Methodist church in Cincinnati, Ohio, in the early 20th century

A womanless wedding is a traditional community "ritual of inversion" performance, popular in the United States in the early 20th century. In this comic ritual, the all male cast would act out all roles of a traditional wedding party – including those of bridesmaids, flower girls, and the mother of the bride – while dressed in gowns and dresses. The event often raised money for charities, civic organizations, and churches. The performances were so popular that scripts were developed around the idea, and the do-it-yourself theatrical productions were passed along from city to city. Some of the stagings included impersonations of notable people, such as Henry Ford and Charlie Chaplin. The performances were often performed by known groups, such as the Civilian Conservation Corps.

== History ==
Early modern Europe, and America prior to the 20th century, used womanless weddings as a way to safely express social strains between classes. The actors were lower-class; would ridicule the social position of the upper-class through skits for entertainment purposes. The upper-class citizens benevolently approved of these acts as cultural acknowledgement of their status in society.

Womanless weddings were performed throughout the United States, but most prominently in the upper Midwest and the South. Southern towns were already staging burlesque shows, and womanless weddings gave another opportunity to raise funds in the form of an admission fee. Womanless weddings traditionally raised funds for causes and organizations, such as a North Carolina womanless wedding which was attended by more than 1000 people to raise funds for the Parent Teacher Association.

=== Social implications ===
A womanless wedding would include a skit of a wedding ceremony, sometimes followed by a reception. The skits would elaborately make fun of gender stereotypes or other gendered qualities that went against the cultural norms of the community. Common themes included opinionated women, premarital pregnancies, males who expressed more feminine qualities than societal standards, racial minorities, and "rural folk".

Prominent male members of a community would typically be the actors of the womanless performances. Their status would allow for their outlandish performances of stereotypical imitations of the minorities of a community, and the conditions of a community that went against the social norms of the culture in the spirit of entertainment to be accepted by the community with humor, rather than backlash and their masculinity being questioned by a community.

== See also ==
- Drag show
- Minstrel show
- Proxy marriage
- Weddings in the United States
