= Dwight Fiske =

American nightclub entertainer and pianist

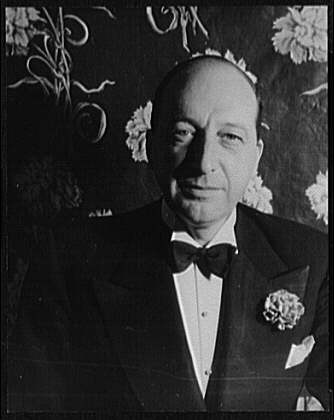
Dwight Fiske (1937) Photo by Carl Van Vechten

Dwight Fiske (1892–1959) was an American nightclub entertainer and pianist noted for his saucy stories and risque recordings. He was perhaps the first entertainer to promote himself on "party records," beginning with 78 rpm releases and later on in the 33 1/3 rpm long-playing format. He also published his stories as illustrated books. During the height of his fame in the 1930s and 1940s, he was associated mainly with the Savoy-Plaza Hotel's Cafe Lounge at Fifth Avenue and East 58th St., and the Versailles Room on East 50th St., where his midnight shows provided a popular nightcap for socialites and visiting celebrities.

Fiske was born in Providence, Rhode Island, and grew up there and in Boston. He briefly attended Harvard, then withdrew to study at the Paris Conservatoire. In his later nightclub routines he claimed to have spent time as an accompanist to silent movies, where he polished his improvisational piano skills. After World War I he entertained Americans in Paris cafes and New York speakeasies. The young actress Tallulah Bankhead, then appearing in the West End, popularized him when he moved to London to play at the Bat Club for nine months. Returning to New York in the early 1930s, Fiske entertained in "expensive speakeasies" (e.g., the Mayfair Yacht Club at 450 East 52nd Street) during the last years of Prohibition, and remained a popular late-night attraction when these establishments turned into legitimate nightclubs in 1933. Fiske's legions of fans included Edward Prince of Wales (Edward VIII), Robert Benchley, and Dorothy Kilgallen.

Fiske had a standard repertory of spoken narratives, usually about a sexually needy woman or animal ("Mrs. Pettibone," "Ida the Wayward Sturgeon"), which he delivered in clipped tones while providing his own piano accompaniment.

== See also ==
- Café society
- American burlesque
