= Jennie Lee (dancer) =

American burlesque dancer and model (1928–1990)

- Born: Virginia Lee Hicks; October 23, 1928; Kansas City, Missouri, U.S.
- Died: March 24, 1990 (aged 61); Helendale, California, U.S.
- Other names: "The Bazoom Girl", "The Burlesque Version of Jayne Mansfield", "Miss 44 and Plenty More"
- Occupations: Stripper, American burlesque star, model, actress
- Years active: 1950s–1960s (stripper); 1953–1964 (actress)
- Spouse: Daniel Lewis Wanick (m. 1949; died 1968)
- Modeling information
- Height: 5 ft 2 in (1.57 m)
- Hair color: Dyed blonde

Jennie Lee (born Virginia Lee Hicks, October 23, 1928 – March 24, 1990) was an American stripper, burlesque entertainer, pin-up model, union activist, and a minor role movie actress, who performed several striptease acts in nightclubs during the 1950s and 1960s. She was also known as "the Bazoom Girl", "the Burlesque Version of Jayne Mansfield", and "Miss 44 and Plenty More".

== Early life ==
She was born with the name Virginia Lee Hicks on October 23, 1928 in Kansas City, Missouri. Due to her figure (42D"–26"–37), she became known as "The Bazoom Girl," "The Burlesque Version of Jayne Mansfield," and eventually, "Miss 44 and Plenty More".

== Career ==
Lee's act centered on how fast she could get her pastie propellers to spin and how dizzy she could make the audience. By the early fifties she broke into acting with minor roles in Peek-A-Boo (1953), Abandon (1958), Cold Wind in August (1961), and 3 Nuts in Search of a Bolt (1964) with Mamie Van Doren. Despite her ambitions of mainstream stardom, she found herself typecast in side roles, and never got her acting career off the ground.

In 1955, she helped start a union for dancers, The Exotic Dancers' League of North America (or EDL), acting as the club's first president. During this time in Los Angeles, dancers' pay rates were very low and the EDL helped fight to improve them and push for improved working conditions. Lee's own salary was also very low, forcing her to live in run-down studio apartments. The dancer tried to keep this from her friends, claiming in a 1980s interview: "They would've thought I was a hooker for sure." During her career Lee appeared on the cover of the magazines Stare in 1954; Risk in 1957; and Frolic in 1958, among others. She wrote an article on herself for a 1955 spread in Modern Man. Besides her life as a stripper, Lee was a pin-up girl throughout her career. Like most of her contemporaries, she didn't pose nude, though in later years she did. She also wrote a monthly column on the burlesque and nightclub scene for several years that appeared in a variety of magazines.

== Late life and death ==
As the years went by, the EDL became more of a social organization for retired dancers and collectible items associated in their acts. Lee gathered press pictures, gowns, pasties, and G-strings of burlesque dancers for the organization and displayed them at businesses she ran, including her nightclub/bar The Sassy Lassy. The collection would become part of the Exotic World museum (Burlesque Hall of Fame) in Helendale, California, which was founded in 1961 by Lee. By the late 1960s, an aging Lee lost interest in her own burlesque career but was still interested in supporting the next generation of Exotic Dancers and memorializing her generation of burlesque performers.

Lee died in 1991 at the age of 61 from cancer. With her death, fellow burlesque dancer, Dixie Evans, took over the Exotic World museum and helped keep burlesque and Lee's legacy alive.

In 1958, she was immortalized in the song "Jennie Lee", recorded by Jan & Arnie. The song was credited to Jan & Arnie because Dean Torrence was in the army at the time of the recording so their friend Arnie Ginsburg recorded the song with Jan Berry.
