= Gentry de Paris =

French burlesque dancer

- Born: Hollywood, California, USA
- Occupation: Writer/Performer

Gentry de Paris is a Paris-based burlesque dancer, art director, and playwright.

== Early life and career ==
She grew up near Disneyland in Anaheim, CA. She first started first dancing with a troupe of chorus girls who did enactments of Busby Berkeley choreographies, then she went on to solo burlesque striptease acts. Her major influence on her style of dance is the golden age of Hollywood.

She moved to Paris just after graduate school, where her master's thesis was on the expatriate artistic community in Paris between the World Wars.

In 2009, Gentry wrote and starred in the TV movie musical Gentry de Paris Revue at the Casino de Paris, directed by Philippe Calvario. The Gentry de Paris Revue ran for two weeks in Paris in September 2009, and it was a Ziegfeld Follies-style theatre extravaganza and the first Grande Revue in Paris for 40 years.

She has performed in Scarlett James' Grande Burlesque Show in Montreal, the Montreal Burlesque Festival, and in other cabarets throughout Europe and North America.

Gentry is also the founder of l’École Supérieure de Burlesque, the first school of its kind in France. It is a school of burlesque for women only.
