= Queen of Burlesque =

1946 film by Sam Newfield

- Directed by: Sam Newfield
- Written by: David Lang; Arthur St. Claire
- Produced by: Arthur Alexander; Alfred Stern
- Starring: Evelyn Ankers; Carleton G. Young; Marion Martin
- Cinematography: Vincent J. Farrar
- Edited by: Jack Ogilvie
- Music by: Walter Greene
- Production company: Sigmund Neufeld Productions
- Distributed by: Producers Releasing Corporation
- Release date: 24 July 1946
- Running time: 70 minutes
- Country: United States
- Language: English

Queen of Burlesque is a 1946 American mystery thriller film directed by Sam Newfield and starring Evelyn Ankers, Carleton G. Young and Marion Martin. The film was distributed by the low-budget Producers Releasing Corporation. Rose La Rose, who played Blossom Terrain, was a stripper in real life and, according to Variety, a "runway peeler with considerable experience." She portrays a supporting character and has one feature dance, a faux "Arabian Fantasy" that is not a striptease.

== Plot ==
When striptease artiste Blossom Terraine is strangled backstage at a burlesque theater, fellow dancer Crystal is suspected of the murder. Crystal's reporter boyfriend Steve turns detective in an attempt to prove her innocence.

== Cast ==
- Evelyn Ankers as Crystal McCoy
- Carleton G. Young as Steve Hurley
- Marion Martin as Lola Cassell
- Craig Reynolds as Joe Nolan
- Rose La Rose as Blossom Terrain
- Emory Parnell as Police Insp. Tom Crowley
- Murray Leonard as Chick Malloy
- Alice Fleming as Annie Morris
- Jacqueline Dalya as Dolly DeVoe
- Charles 'Red' Marshall as Johnson
- Nolan Leary as Pop, Stage Doorman
- David Fresco as Mac, Stage Manager
- Charles King as Dugan

== Critical reception ==
Leonard Maltin described it as "low-budget suspenser unstrung backstage at burlesque theater"; while TV Guide called it "a standard programmer, racier than most of its type thanks to the burlesque setting. Nonetheless, the dialog and mystery are routine. Acting and production values are adequate for the material."
