= Rose La Rose =

American burlesque dancer and actress

- Born: Rosina DePella; October 27, 1916; New York City, US
- Died: July 29, 1972 (aged 55); Toledo, Ohio, US
- Other name: "Queen of Burlesque"
- Occupations: Stripper, burlesque star, actress, businesswoman
- Years active: 1931–1972
- Spouse(s): J. Harrington Price; Francesco Ruocco
- Modeling information
- Height: 5 ft 4 in (1.63 m)
- Hair color: Brunette

Rose La Rose (October 27, 1916? – July 27, 1972) was an American burlesque dancer, film actress, and stripper nicknamed the "Queen of Burlesque," the title of a 1946 Hollywood film in which she appeared.

She was one of the rare women on the burlesque circuit to evolve from performer to theater owner when, later in her life, she traded her performing career for that of owner and operator of two Toledo, Ohio, burlesque theaters.

== Early years ==
Various sources list her birth year as 1913, 1916, or 1919. According to her public relations manager, Eddie Jaffee, she attended Textile High School in New York City. From the age of 15, she worked as a $22‐a‐week cashier in H. K. Minsky's Republic Theater on West 42nd Street.

One night, when one of the Minsky showgirls failed to report to work, La Rose was tapped to replace her.

== Burlesque career ==
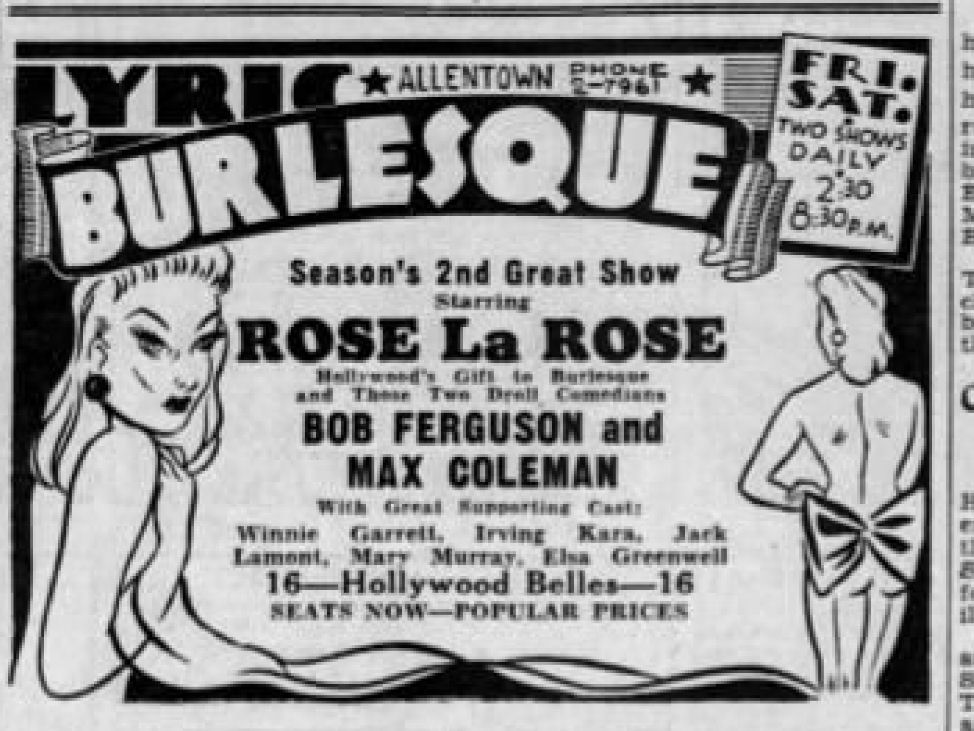
A newspaper ad from 1940.

La Rose took her name from a sign painter who, because he thought "Rosina DePella" not stage-worthy, changed her name on a sign he was painting to "Rose La Rose." She disliked the name at first, but it stuck, and she eventually adopted it as her legal name.

La Rose became renowned for performing a "reverse strip," appearing on stage wearing very little, then getting dressed before the audience.

"Burlesque is more than stripping," she said. "It is beautiful costumes, comics, production numbers and much more."

La Rose was said to have been the first strip tease dancer to be paid over $2,000 a week. At the height of her fame in the 1940s and 1950s, she was reported to have commanded $2,500 a week on the national burlesque circuit.

== Hollywood ==
La Rose appeared in the 1938 film The Wages of SIn, performing a partial striptease until interrupted by an angry boyfriend who covers her with a table cloth.

In the 1946 mystery thriller Queen of Burlesque, she played striptease artiste Blossom Terraine, who is strangled backstage at a burlesque theater.

=== Retirement ===
La Rose retired from performing in 1958 when her mother, who had accompanied her on the road for 18 years and was affectionately called "Mother DePella" by other performers, became ill and desired to settle down.

== Theater owner ==
=== The Town Hall Theater ===
La Rose's earnings and financial savviness allowed her the means to invest her savings. In 1958, after moving to Toledo, she bought the Town Hall Theater (at St. Clair and Orange Streets) from theater magnate Leroy Griffith. The theater, built in 1887, stood as a burlesque house until 1968 when it was razed for an urban renewal project.

In May 1968, weeks before its demolition, La Rose auctioned off memorabilia from the theater, including trunk loads of her own personal costumes from her early years in burlesque.

As a Toledo citizen and business owner, she became active in her community, speaking at the Junior League, giving strip tease lessons to wives to help them to enliven their relationships, and giving generously to a variety of causes.

=== The Esquire Theater ===
Shortly before the Town Hall's demolition, La Rose bought the Esquire Theater (at Superior and Jefferson Streets), a move that prompted the city council, at the urging of a group of businessmen on the same block as the Esquire, to ban burlesque in March 1968. She was in the process of remodeling it for live theater.

La Rose fought the ban and succeeded in obtaining a federal court injunction to stop the city from enforcing it. But she was diagnosed with cancer in 1971 and died the following year, effectively ending burlesque in the city. The Esquire was still operating the year of her death, showing adult movies with occasional burlesque performances. It was demolished in 2007.

In 1971, the Junior League of Toledo invited her to perform in its charity show; it was to be her last performance.

"When I stopped live burlesque and substituted a second movie instead, I told myself it was just temporary," she said in an interview shortly before she died. "I figured customers would protest or stay away and I'd find a way to bring burlesque back. But my customers did neither. They said nothing and kept coming. I knew then that burlesque was through. I just couldn't bring myself to say it out loud."

== Personal life ==
La Rose was married twice. Her first marriage was to toy manufacturer J. Harrington Price. She sued for divorce in 1941. According to an item in Time:

Minsky Stripper Rose La Rose [...] told New York Sunday News reporters that after a hard day's work she had to put on an extra show at home while Price played his mouth organ. "In the theater I have my audience and am inspired," she said. "There was no inspiration performing for an audience of one.…I would be crying, but all he would say was: 'Take it off! Take it off!'" Of Price's harmonica style she declared: "It stifled me."

Her second husband, Francesco Ruocco, was an Italian landscape artist. They were married March 1, 1944, in Las Vegas, Nevada. They separated in June 1952. According to an item in the Oct. 21, 1952, issue of the New York Daily News:

Ten years ago, when she divorced Price, she complained that her first hubby made her take-'em-off after hours, while he played the harmonica in their bedroom.

Husband No. 2, Miss La Rose said heatedly yesterday, wanted her to put-'em-on -- pounds, that is.

"I'm 5 foot 4 and weigh 120," she explained. "Patrons of my art just adore me and my figure. But Francesco's ideal woman was the Roman matron. He believed a woman should weigh at least 150 pounds, and preferably more. When I was home from tour, he'd try to fatten me up with spaghetti, ravioli, lasagna and pastafazool. Can you imagine how the customers would have reacted if I showed up fat?"

La Rose was described as a "petite brunette, standing 5‐foot‐4." She enjoyed bear hunting in Alaska and was credited with once killing a 1,176‐pound Kodiak bear.

== Death ==
La Rose died of cancer at her Toledo home on the night of July 27, 1972. She left an estate of $728,000, on which one newspaper observed, "Strip-teasing must have been a profitable profession....Of course she was also a good businesswoman, too."

== Filmography ==
- The Wages of Sin (1938)
- Queen of Burlesque (1946)
