= The World Famous Pontani Sisters =

Burlesque dance trio

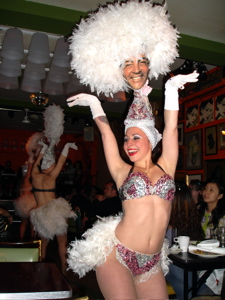
Pontani Sisters

The World Famous Pontani Sisters are a dance act and burlesque revue based in New York City, consisting of three sisters: Angie Pontani, Tara Pontani, and Helen Pontani. They have been billed more recently as Angie Pontani and the World Famous Pontani Sisters.

== Description ==
The three sisters, who had danced and performed informally since childhood, got their professional start during the late 1990s swing revival craze, as a side act of the popular swing band The Flying Neutrinos. They have since taken part in burlesque-style performances and revues on the East Coast and throughout the United States. The sisters dance in a wide and eclectic variety of styles covering much of twentieth century dance, but often in a high-energy "go-go" style to instrumental Rock and Roll. The sisters perform in a variety of exotic costumes featuring ostrich feathers, tassels, sequins, and fancy headdresses, many of which they design themselves.

The act was conceived by performer/costume designer/choreographer Angie Pontani, the youngest of the three dancing sisters. She described the beginnings of the act in an interview: "The Pontani Sisters were literally [sic] born dancing on the boardwalk in Coney Island. I had been performing in a burlesque show in Manhattan almost direct from high school. When that show closed, I didn't know what to do with myself, so I turned my curtains into costumes, made three headdresses out of my plastic fruit kitchen table centerpiece, threw them on my sisters and we went to Coney Island and danced on the boardwalk. Within a month we were performing four nights a week throughout NYC. It was really kismet."

There is also a younger sister in the family named Dana, who, according to the Pontanis' official website, occasionally performs with her sisters as a singer.

The sisters have toured Europe and the United States extensively, often with Los Straitjackets. The Pontanis appear on the cover of the Los Straitjackets album Twist Party!!!, also credited to "Los Straitjackets with the World Famous Pontani Sisters and Kaiser George", and appear on an accompanying DVD. They have performed several times with Los Straitjackets on Late Night with Conan O'Brien. The Pontani Sisters were the subject of a 2004 documentary film by Rebecca Shapiro, Showy and Five Foot Two.

The Sisters have released two DVDs combining dance instruction with aerobic exercise- "Go-Go Robics" & "Go Go Robics II".

Since 2008, Angie Pontani has also been performing as a solo artist, and all three World Famous Pontani Sisters have been prominently involved in a movement to save historic Coney Island in New York from developers.

The Pontani Sisters were awarded the title, "Best NY Based Dance Company", in 2002 by Show Business Weekly, "Best Super Hot Dancing Trio", by The Village Voice in 2006 as well as "#1 Burlesque Attraction in the Nation" in 2006 by AOL.com.

In May 2026, The World Famous Pontani Sisters reunited on Angie's podcast Showing Off with Brian Newman & Angie Pontani for an interview.
