= Minsky Malone =

Australian erotic dancer

Minsky Malone, also known as Charlie Robinson, is an Australian creative director for stage, an international burlesque performer, and the creative director of House of Burlesque. Since 1997 she has performed around the world, first starting with her troupe in the seaside tourist town of Blackpool in northern England. During this time she appeared on British TV on Ali G and Men and Motors, followed by tours in Milan and Ibiza (1997–2000).

In 2004 Malone started the Melbourne Burlesque School, in which graduates formed Australia's only Fan Dancing Troupe and performed in various events. In 2008 Malone wrote, directed, and produced burlesque-vaudeville play 'Pandora's Dolls' as part of the Melbourne Fringe Festival. In January 2009 her Minsky's Circus Burlesque was voted the top New Year's Eve Event in Melbourne by the Melbourne Age. In 2009 she performed, co-wrote and directed a Dali Burlesque show for the National Gallery of Victoria. In 2010 she judged the Miss Burlesque New Zealand and Miss Burlesque Australia.

In 2012 Malone appeared in the German documentary film Melbourne - Australiens neue Boomtown (Melbourne - Australia's New Boomtown) by Stephan Düfel.
