= Millie DeLeon =

American burlesque dancer

- Born: Elizabeth or Maude Lawrence c.1873 U.S.
- Died: August 6, 1922 (aged 48–49); New York City, U.S.
- Other name: Millie Lawrence
- Occupation: Burlesque dancer
- Spouse: Lew Rose

Millie DeLeon (c. 1873 – August 6, 1922) was the stage name of American burlesque dancer Millie Lawrence, described as "the first real queen of American Burlesque."

== Biography ==
Her birth details and background are unreported. Her original name is given variously in records as Elizabeth or Maude Lawrence, and the name "Millie" apparently originated as a corruption of the French Mlle.. She was born in about 1873; her daughter Pamela Lawrence was born in 1891, and also became a vaudeville performer.

Her career started as a "coocher" or "hoochie-coochie" dancer, assuming a fashionably French stage name and performing erotic dances in an oriental style, or belly dances, while fully clothed. By about 1900, she was established as a vaudeville performer in Cincinnati, and was managed by impresario James Fennessy, proprietor of Hubert Heuck’s People’s Theater. By 1903, her act had developed to the point where, according to writer Rachel Shteir, "she presented a saucier persona. There is no other way to describe De Leon's act than to say that she impersonated a prostitute. She sauntered onstage swaying her hips and paused, flashing her bare or bestockinged calf... She tossed garters from a basket and sashayed into the crowd...".

DeLeon was known as "The Queen of all Dancers" or as "The Girl in Blue" - "blue" being a subtle reference to indecency - and was notorious for manipulating the media through the artful use of scandal. She has been called "The first real queen of American Burlesque" and "burlesque’s first truly national sex symbol". As her act developed, her signature stage maneuver was to remove her garters, so revealing her lack of underwear, and throw them into the audience. She traveled across America as a performer, often testing the limits of local indecency ordinances, and was arrested numerous times in the U.S. and Canada between 1903 and 1915. In 1914, the Philadelphia North American reported:

From knee to neck she was convulsive... Every muscle became eloquent of primitive emotion. Amid groans, cat calls, and howls of approval from the audience, she stopped. Standing suddenly erect, with a deft movement she revealed her nude right leg from knee almost to waist… Streaked and sweaty, her face took on the aspect of epilepsy. She bit her lips, rolled her eyes, pulled fiercely at great handfuls of her black, curly hair. Indescribable noises and loud suggestions mingled in the hot breath of the audience. Men in the orchestra rose with shouts. A woman – one of six present – hissed. Laughter became uproarious. And then, sensing her climax, Millie De Leon gave a little cry that was more of a yelp, and ceased.

In 1907 she married producer Lew Rose (Louis Rosenstamm), the younger brother of impresario Ike Rose; they later divorced.

She died in 1922, in hospital in New York, "due to a complication of diseases".
