= Dixie Evans =

American burlesque dancer and stripper (1926–2013)

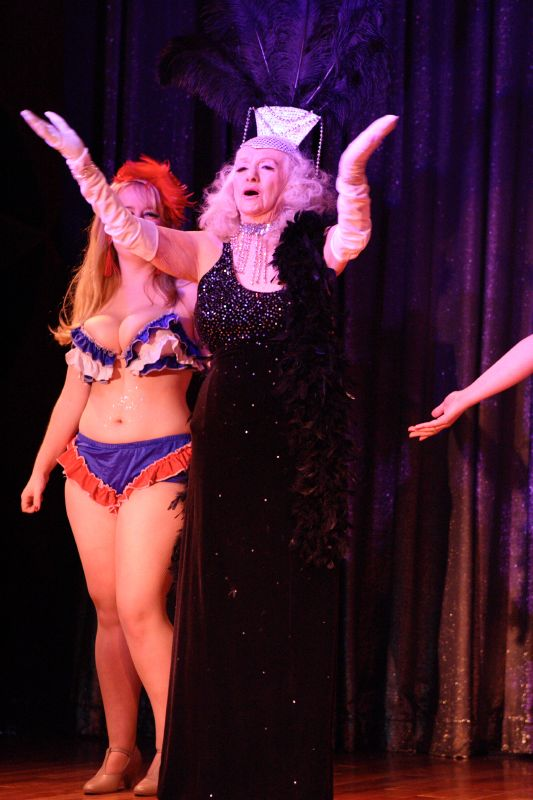
- Evans (right) at the Miss Exotic World Pageant, 2006
- Born: Mary Lee Evans; August 28, 1926; Long Beach, California, U.S.
- Died: August 3, 2013 (aged 86); Las Vegas, Nevada, U.S.
- Occupation: Burlesque dancer
- Spouse: Harry Braelow (m. 1963; div. 1965)

Mary Lee "Dixie" Evans (August 28, 1926 – August 3, 2013) was an American burlesque dancer and stripper, best known for a burlesque parody she performed as Marilyn Monroe.

== Career ==
Evans entered show-business as a model and later chorus girl before becoming a star dancer.

In 1950, she appeared in Too Hot to Handle, a burlesque film, by burlesque impresario Lillian Hunt (former manager, El Rey Burlesk Theater, Oakland, CA), filmed at the Follies Theatre in Los Angeles also known as Fig Leaf Frolics.

By the early 1950s she was a headlining burlesque star on the West Coast when approached by producer Harold Minsky with a promise of steady work in his chain of theaters if she adapted her stage persona to that of then-rising star Marilyn Monroe. At first Evans objected but soon agreed. Like other strippers of the time period (including Lili St. Cyr and Jennie Lee), Evans was extremely well known in nightclubs and was largely under-paid. Evans's Monroe-burlesque act was the dancer's gimmick. Several other dancers also parodied female stars and noted historic women. Her acts parodied Monroe's films and known aspects of Monroe's life.

In real life Evans was three inches bigger in her breast than Monroe: Evans (est. 40-26-34) and Monroe (est. 37-24-35). According to the reporters, Evans looked very like Monroe. When Monroe died in 1962, Evans prepared a tribute show which was well received by critics and audiences. Evans soon came to feel disturbed by being sometimes mistaken for the dead star and curtailed the act, replacing it with a parody of Irma La Douce. Evans was still a draw, but the burlesque she loved was drying up and as she entered her late thirties she retired from performing and helped run the entertainment at a resort facility.

Upon the death of her close-friend and dancer Jennie Lee in 1990, Evans took over the annual reunion meetings of the Exotic Dancers League Lee had helped found and the burlesque collectible museum, Exotic World, later Burlesque Hall of Fame that Lee had owned and run. In 1991, Evans began to produce annual fundraising shows to support the museum and its holdings. The museum consisted of hundreds of items used in burlesque entertainers' acts over the years and was moved from its original location in 2005 and 2006. Evans had returned to modeling in the late 1980s and resumed performing during the first dozen years of the events, later limiting herself to on-stage addresses. Her last full-fledged Monroe impersonation may have been at the 2002 Tease-O-Rama event where she mimicked Monroe's performance of "Runnin' Wild" from the film Some Like It Hot. She also gave numerous tours of the museum at its original location and would recite bits of her old Monroe acts in her uncannily accurate Monroe soundalike voice for attendees.

== Death ==
Evans died in Las Vegas, Nevada, at the age of 86.
