= New Orleans Burlesque Festival =

The New Orleans Burlesque Festival is an annual, three-day, burlesque festival held in New Orleans. The venues are the Civic Theatre, the Harrah's Casino, and House of Blues. The festival was founded in 2009 and is held in mid-to-late September.

2020 saw the festival go on hiatus and plans to return in 2021.
