= Missy Malone =

Scottish burlesque performer (born 1985)

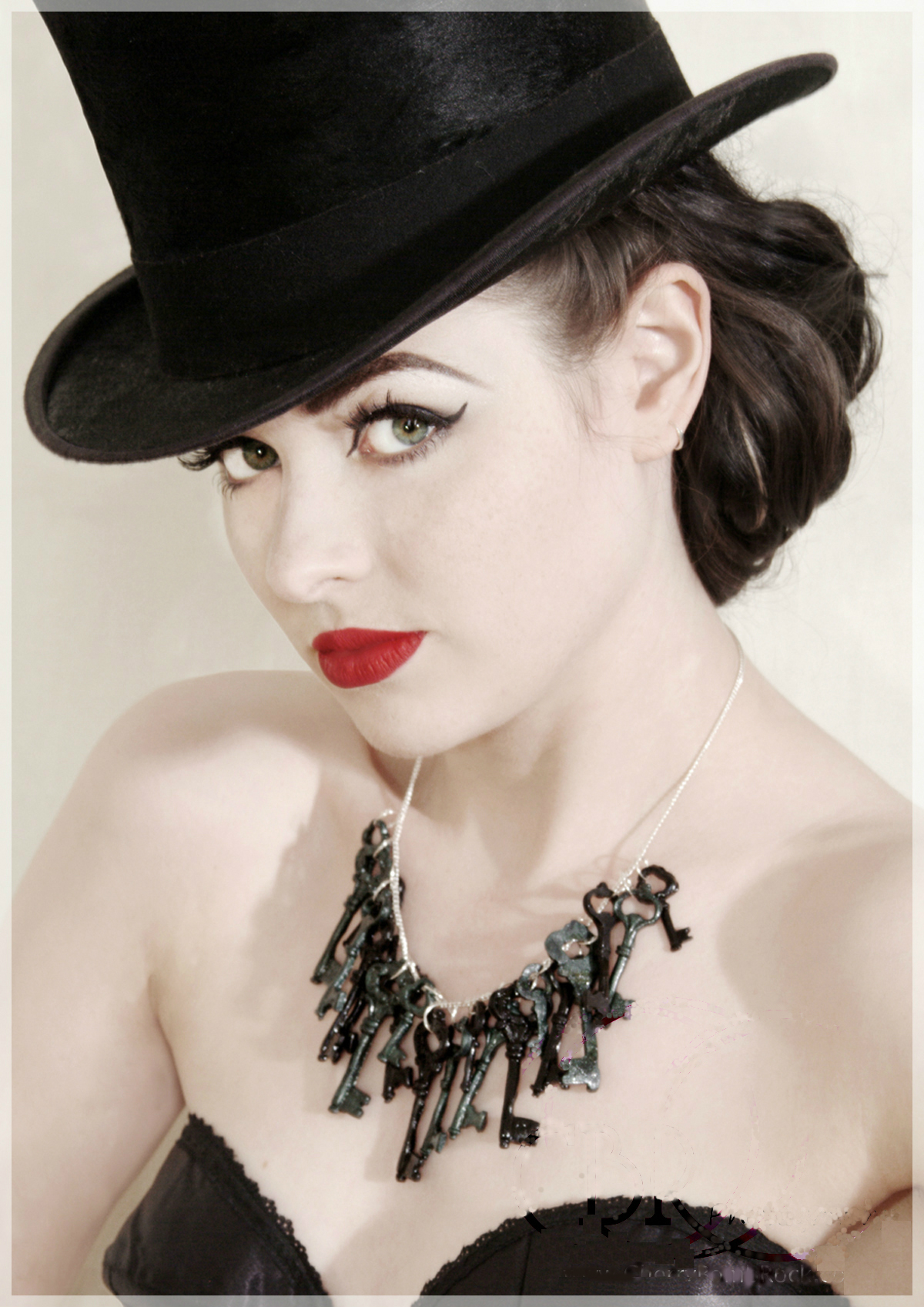
- Malone in 2009
- Born: 16 May 1985 (age 41); Livingston, West Lothian, Scotland
- Education: Edinburgh College of Art (BA)
- Occupations: Burlesque performer, actress, model
- Website: missymalone.co.uk

Missy Malone (born 16 May 1985) is a Scottish burlesque performer currently based in central England.

== Early years ==
As an only child, Malone and grew up in Livingston, Scotland. Throughout her childhood she attended dance and drama classes. She studied drama and art during high school and spent one school year training at 'Powder' circus school in Glasgow specializing in trapeze and stilt walking. Malone attended Edinburgh College of Art 2003–2007 graduating with a BA Hons Degree in Performance Costume Design. During school holidays as a teenager she worked in a local alternative record store. A huge fan of American popular culture she makes regular trips to Los Angeles. Malone specialised in striptease and acrobalance costumes and corsetry design for her final year of her costume design degree. She customises or creates all her own performance costumes and has styled many photo shoots.

Inspired by classic American pin-up artwork, particularly WWII aircraft nose art, she studied this imagery in her art work and costume designs. Classic American pin-up beauties remain a large influence on her style.

The distinctive white streak in Malone's naturally dark hair has been maintained since she was a teenager. Her father would affectionately call her 'Mallen' after the family from the 1979 TV series The Mallens.

== Burlesque ==
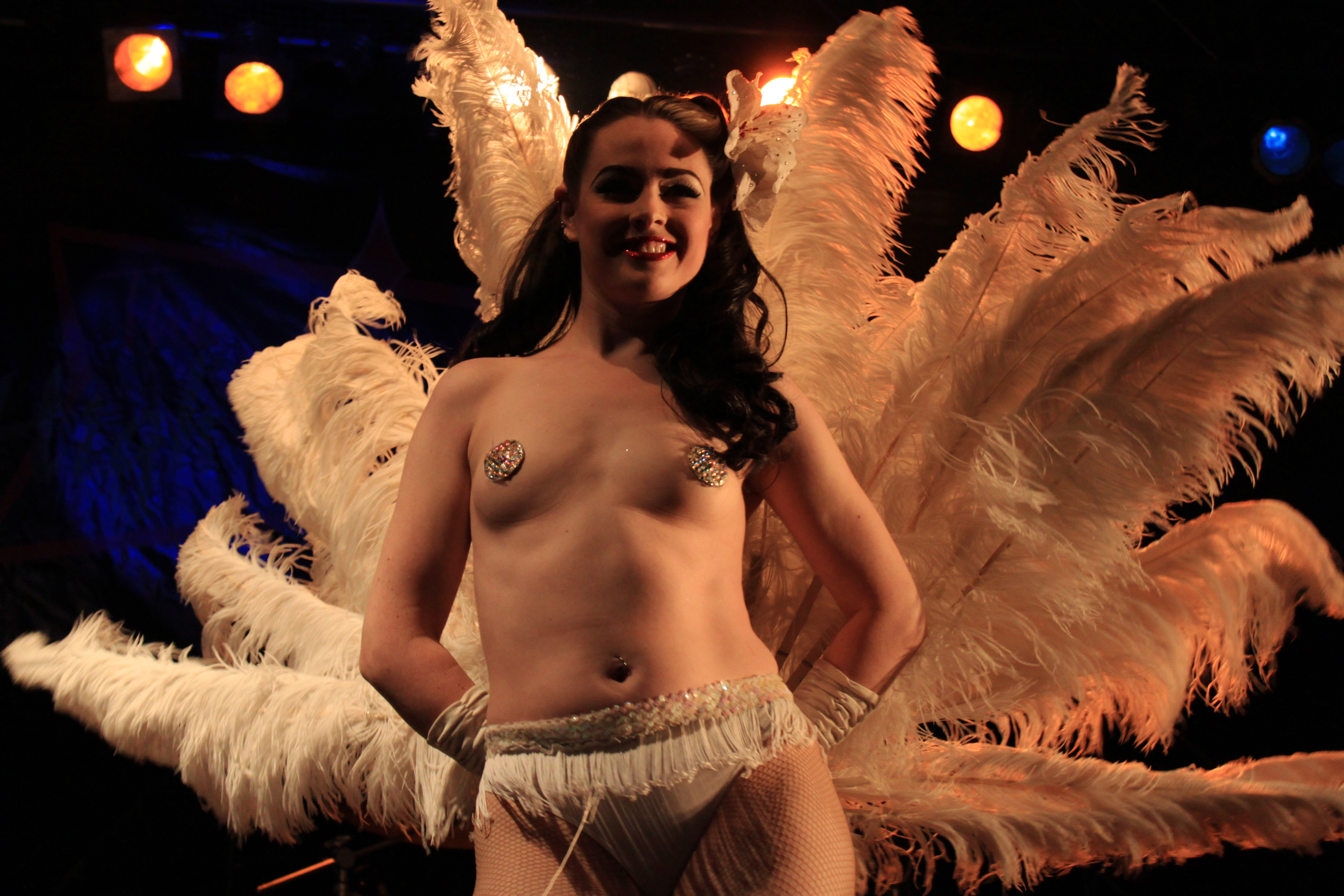
Missy Malone performing a fan dance in Calafell, Catalonia, Spain in 2010

Malone is most known for her work as a burlesque performer. As soon as Malone turned 18, she started performing. She developed a wide range of acts and is mostly known several: her stilt walking 9 ft ‘Bride’ act a tribute to the 1935 classic movie Bride of Frankenstein, fan dance with 4 ft long white feather fans, 'Jack Frost' in a rich black velvet cloak, a variety of other acts including a champagne themed balloon dance, a gambling cowgirl act entitled "Ace of Spades", a classic 1950s bump and grind act "Comanche", and several character acts depicting cupid, a nurse, pirate, and sailor.

Malone works regularly with her dance partner Leyla Rose. Their double acts include a classic Hawaiian hula, a pillow fight, and a rock & roll military act.

From 2003 Malone became a regular performer in the British Burlesque scene, performing across the country in shows like Candybox burlesque in Birmingham and Torture Garden London. In August 2006 Malone performed at the Italian rockabilly festival 'Summer Jamboree' with her then dance partner Foxy (Rachel) Rouge for over 2000 people. Malone took up full-time work as a burlesque performer from December 2007 when she toured with The Damned on their 'twisted Cabaret' UK/Ireland tour.

She performs across continental Europe and the UK.

In 2009, Malone hosted a large scale variety show alongside Leyla Rose as Part of The Glasgow Cabaret Festival. The Missy & Leyla Show was produced by Rhymes with Purple Productions and featured a line-up of performers that Malone and Rose chose themselves.

== Acting ==
At 15 years old Malone got her first professional acting job in a Scottish (H.E.B.S) Anti-Smoking television commercial (Club Smoking). Other commercial works include a Royal Bank of Scotland T.V Commercial and an Olympus magazine promotional advertisement, she has also been interviewed on several European television programmes.

Malone has appeared in several short and feature-length films including

- Bootprints by King Creosote (2005) music video
- And Yet I feel Innocent by Ruth Paxton (2006) short film
- Big Men by Ruth Paxton (2007) short film
- She wanted to be burnt by Ruth Paxton (2007) short film
- Diamonds by The Damned (2008) music video
- New Town Killers by Richard Jobson (2008) feature film
- Paris/Sexy by Ruth Paxton (2009) short film.

== Modelling ==
Malone has featured in Bizarre magazine, Practical Photography, Borne Magazine, Alternative Magazine, ScotsGay, Custom Car Magazine, Kustom Magazine, I-ON Edinburgh Magazine, Shimmy Magazine, The List magazine, Pinstriping and Kustom Graphics Magazine, One and Milkcow Magazine. She has also been on the cover of The List, Burlesque Magazine, Leither, Fools in print and Civvy Street.

Newspaper features include: The Sun, Metro, The Scotsman, The Herald, The Evening News, Glasgow Evening Times, and The Courier.

She has promoted and been the face of brands such as Buttress and Snatch, Vivien of Holloway, Toxico, Clutterfly Jewellery, What Katie Did, Lily Lo Lo Mineral cosmetics, Vintage Lime, Olympus cameras, Xbox game "Battlestations Midway" and "Battlestations Pacific". Missy is also signed up to Stolen Model Agency.

Malone has also been painted by artists that include low-brow artist Vince Ray.
