= Miss Polly Rae =

British burlesque player

Miss Polly Rae (born 8 July 1981) is a British singer, dancer, and Neo-burlesque performer.

== Burlesque career ==
Polly Jane Rae was born in Preston, Lancashire, England.

Polly's burlesque career began in 2006, after seeing a poster for a burlesque course run by Jo King and the London Academy of Burlesque at Danceworks studios. She attended the course and completely inspired by Jo and her teachings she decided to form her seven girl troupe Hurly Burly (including herself). Taking creative inspiration from 1940s and 1950s pin-ups such as Bettie Page, Tempest Storm and Marilyn Monroe to modern artists like Madonna and revue shows such as Le Crazy Horse in Paris, their first show was held at the Soho Revue Bar (formerly the Raymond Revue Bar) in Soho in 2006. It was such a success that it led to a residency at the bar, another residency at Volupté (a burlesque supper club in the heart of the legal district) – and then a move to the Leicester Square Theatre in London's West End. This show received acclaim from several critics including The Stage and What's On Stage. In 2007 Hurly Burly won Best Troupe at the Ministry Of Burlesque awards. They have appeared on the Alan Titchmarsh Show. February 2010 brought the launch of Miss Polly Rae: The All New Hurly Burly Show, with special guest act Elouise, directed by William Baker. Musical direction was by Steve Anderson. The show received high acclaim from critics such as Michael Billington (The Guardian) and Charles Spencer (The Daily Telegraph), amongst others, and it returned to the Garrick Theatre in the West End, newly named The Hurly Burly Show, until May 2011. Miss Polly Rae and her Hurly Burly Girlys have collectively worked alongside Dusty Limits, Frisky and Mannish, Ivy Paige, Lady Carol, Stewart Pemberton, Frank Sanazi and James Devine.

Miss Polly Rae is also a singer, and sings songs by the likes of Peggy Lee, Shirley Bassey, Mae West and Doris Day. She has had solo success. In 2007 she was recruited as part of a touring performance team for Agent Provocateur and appeared on The Paul O'Grady Show. In 2008 she became the face of the No 1 Eidos computer game Battlestations Pacific as a wartime sweetheart. In 2015, she won the Best Burlesque award at the London Cabaret Awards.
