= Burlesque Hall of Fame =

Museum in Las Vegas, Nevada, USA

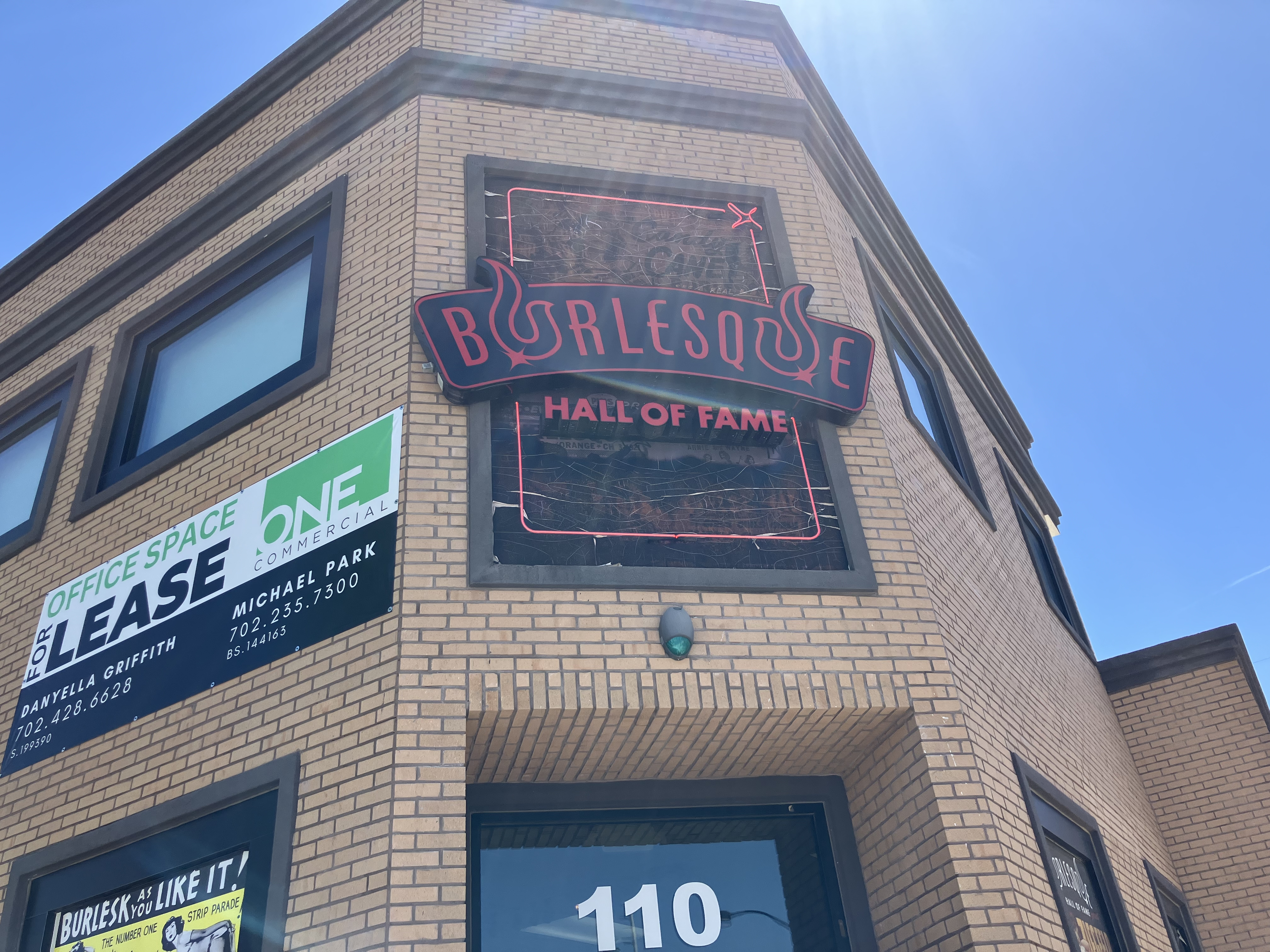
- Burlesque Fall of Fame, Las Vegas
- Established: 1990 Helendale, California, moved 2006 Las Vegas, Nevada
- Dissolved: 20 July 2025
- Location: 1027 South Main Street; Las Vegas, Nevada 89101
- Type: Hall of fame
- Website: www.burlesquehall.com

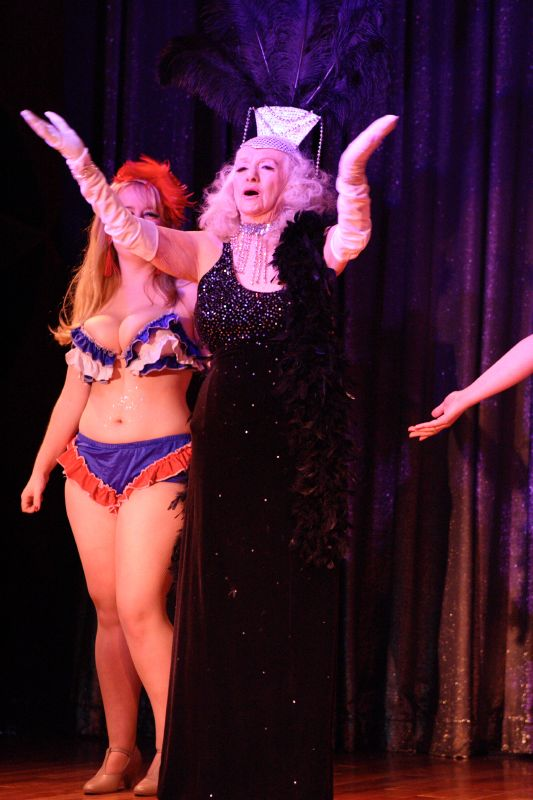
Former performer Dixie Evans was the curator of the Burlesque Hall of Fame in Las Vegas

The Burlesque Hall of Fame (BHOF) was the world's only museum dedicated to the history, preservation, and future of the art of burlesque. Located in the Las Vegas Arts district at 1027 S Main St. #110, BHOF was a tourist destination and non-profit 501 (c)(3) educational organization offering tours of its vast collection of costumes, memorabilia, props and ephemera from burlesque's heyday through contemporary practice; classes for individuals and groups at all levels including beginner; movie screenings; research access for students and journalists; and a gift shop. It closed its door on 20 July 2025.

Formerly known as Exotic World, the museum began as the personal collection of striptease artist and founding member of The Exotic Dancers' League of America Jennie Lee. After her death in 1990, her friend and fellow entertainer, Dixie Evans, created the museum in Helendale, California, and launched the "Miss Exotic World" Competition in 1990.

In 2006, The Burlesque Hall of Fame relocated from Helendale to Las Vegas, NV, to establish itself as a permanent tourist attraction and exhibition space for its collection. After nearly a decade in the Emergency Arts building in the heart of a revitalized Downtown Las Vegas, the museum moved to Las Vegas' Arts district in 2018.

This Miss Exotic World competition was in its 29th year (as of 2019), and has grown to become The Burlesque Hall of Fame Weekender, a four-day convention held annually in Las Vegas that includes class, vending, museum tours, pin-up safaris, and four nights of showcases: Movers, Shakers, and Innovators; The Titans of Tease Reunion (then in its 68th year); The Miss Exotic World Competition; and Icons and All-Stars.

== History ==
Retired dancer Jennie Lee started collecting burlesque memorabilia when she owned the Sassy Lassy nightclub in San Pedro, California. After Lee was diagnosed with breast cancer, she and her husband moved to an abandoned goat farm in Helendale, California, located in the Mojave Desert about one third of the way between Los Angeles, California and Las Vegas, Nevada.

Lee intended to create a burlesque museum, found a burlesque school and run a bed and breakfast, and the goat farm site had enough room to contain her growing collection. Only the museum got started within her lifetime.

After Lee died in 1990, Dixie Evans took over the farm and turned it into The Exotic World Burlesque Museum, aided by Lee's widower, Charlie Arroyo. Lee's memorabilia formed the core of the collection, and in 1993 Dixie Evens performed along with then burlesque queen Venus De Light on the Joan Rivers Show titled "Proving Burlesque Isn't Dead" and people from around the world soon started to donate items to Exotic World. The collection grew large enough to fill the entire farm. Exotic Dancers still performing throughout the world convene once a year and perform for each other and enjoy each other's camaraderie and crown one lucky burlesque performer Miss Exotic World.

In late 2005, the museum was temporarily closed for inventory and renovations in the wake of Arroyo's unexpected death and significant weather damage to the museum facilities. Although the museum was not open at the time of the annual Miss Exotic World Pageant in 2006, the pageant was nevertheless held at an alternate venue, the Celebrity Theater in Las Vegas. In 2006, the Burlesque Hall of Fame relocated from Helendale to a temporary space in The Las Vegas Emergency Arts building.

The Hall of Fame relocated to a permanent premises in S Main Street, Las Vegas in April 2018. It was closed on 20 July 2025.

== Legends of Burlesque ==
The Burlesque Hall of Fame does not have a formal induction process. The museum is dedicated to celebrating and honoring the entire history of burlesque. A "Living Legend of the Year" award is presented annually during the BHOF Weekender to a performer who has made a significant contribution to burlesque history. BHOF also presents a "Sassy Lassy" award to a person who has contributed significantly to the promotion and preservation of the art of burlesque.

Living Legend of the Year recipients include:

- 2025 Ellion Ness
- 2024 Tiffany Carter
- 2023 Val Valentine
- 2022 Gina Bon Bon
- 2021 Bambi Jones
- 2020 Coby Yee
- 2019 Camille 2000
- 2018 Kitten Natividad
- 2017 Lottie the Body
- 2016 Dee Milo
- 2015 April March
- 2014 Toni Elling
- 2013 Tai Ping
- 2012 La Savona
- 2011 Barbara Yung
- 2010 Betty Rowland
- 2009 Satan's Angel
- 2007 Tura Satana
- 2004 Tempest Storm
- 2003 Mitzi Sinclaire

Sassy Lassy recipients include:

- 2025 Dainty Smith
- 2025 Perle Noire
- 2024 David Bishop
- 2024 Miss AuroraBoobRealis
- 2023 Coco Framboise
- 2023 Harvest Moon
- 2022 Alotta Boutté
- 2022 Ronnie Magri
- 2021 Award not given
- 2020 Award not given
- 2019 Simone de la Getto
- 2018 Indigo Blue
- 2017 Ophelia Flame
- 2016 Ursulina
- 2016 Fisherman
- 2015 Otter (Blue Angel)
- 2015 Bonnie Dunn (Blue Angel)
- 2015 Bambi the Mermaid (Burlesque on the Beach)
- 2015 Dick Zigun (Burlesque on the Beach)
- 2015 Madison Stone (Burlesque pioneer and scream queen)
- 2014 Torchy Taboo
- 2014 Grant Philipo
- 2014 Vivienne VaVoom
- 2013 Katy K
- 2013 Catherine D'Lish
- 2013 Scott Ewalt
- 2012 Dita Von Teese
- 2012 Don Spiro
- 2012 Jo "Boobs" Weldon
- 2011 Billie Madley
- 2011 Baby Doe Von Stoheim (Tease-O-Rama)
- 2011 Alison Fensterstock (Tease-O-Rama)
- 2011 Debbie Mink (Tease-O-Rama)
- 2011 Alan Perowski (Tease-O-Rama)
- 2011 Michelle Carr

== Museum collection ==
The Exotic World museum collection includes costumes, props, posters, photographs, publicity stills, newspaper clippings, and playbills related to famous burlesque performers including Venus De Light, Dita Von Teese, Blaze Starr, Lili St. Cyr, Chesty Morgan, Candy Barr and Tempest Storm.

The museum includes costume elements and props such as feather boas, fans, gloves, garter belts, gowns, shoes, pasties, g-strings, and jewelry. Many of these items are specially made for use in striptease routines.

Unique individual items include ivory fans used by Sally Rand, gloves and a black velvet shoulder cape worn by Gypsy Rose Lee, a heart-shaped couch owned by Jayne Mansfield and the cremation ashes of Miss Sheri Champagne.

== Film ==
The history of the Burlesque Hall of Fame is the featured subject of the 2010 documentary Exotic World & the Burlesque Revival. Dixie Evans appears in Leslie Zemeckis' documentary Behind the Burly Q.

== Miss Exotic World Pageant ==
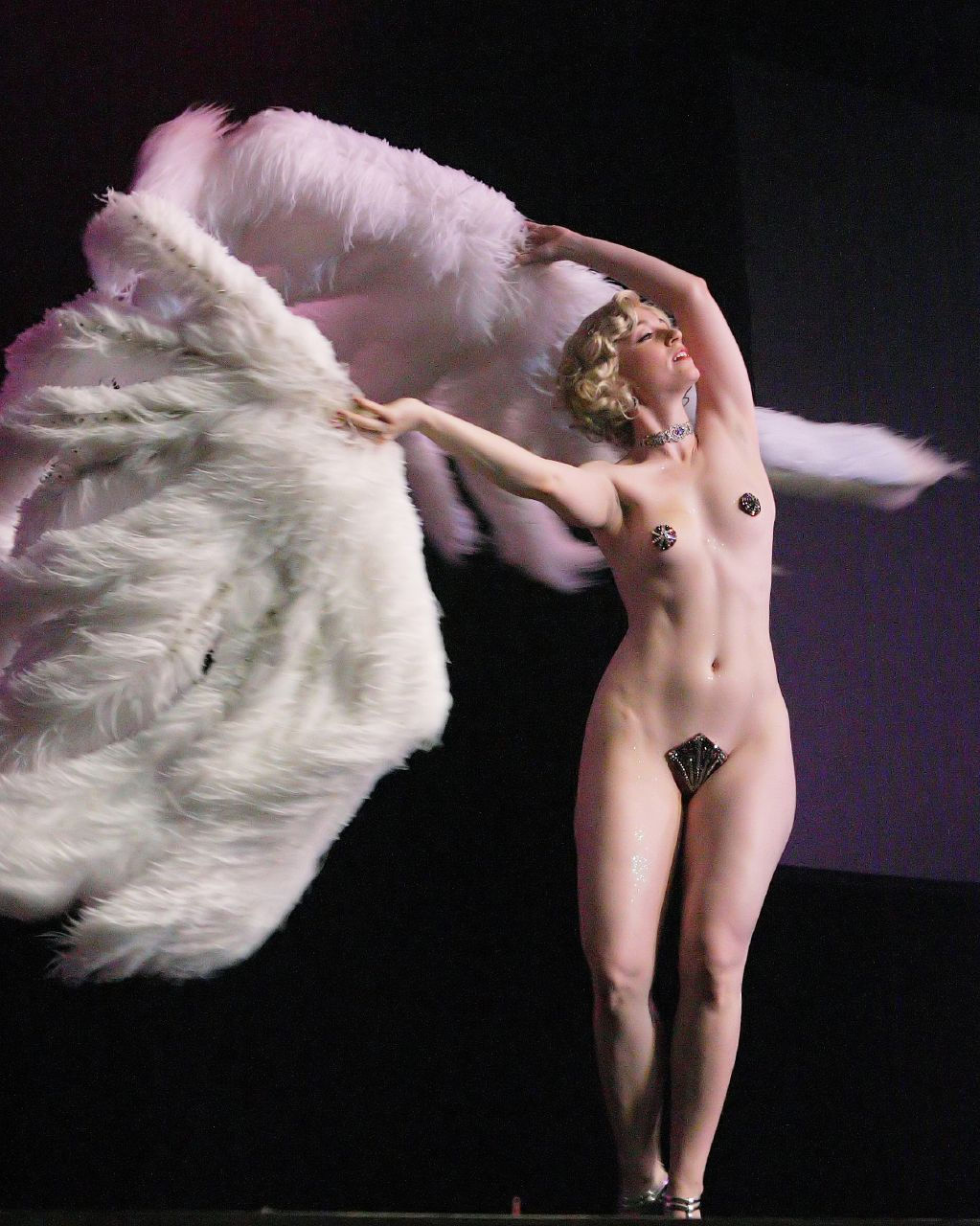
Michelle L'amour performing fan dance at Miss Exotic World Pageant (2007)

Exotic World hosts the annual Miss Exotic World pageant on the first Saturday of every June. Each year a Neo-burlesque performer is crowned Miss Exotic World in a contest often referred to as the Miss America of burlesque. Winners receive both the title and a trophy.

Evolving from annual celebrations for the Exotic Dancers League union, Dixie Evans initiated the Miss Exotic World pageant in 1990 as a way to draw people to the museum. She garnered attention by sending out a press release claiming that "Lili St. Cyr, Tempest Storm, Blaze Starr and 30 other alumni of burlesque will all be invited to attend this reunion." While technically true, none of those invitees attended that year. However, the release garnered press attention for the pageant, which was successful enough to become an annual event.

Each contest features burlesque performances by both stars from burlesque's golden age and younger women involved in the New Burlesque scene.

=== Miss Exotic World 2025 ===
- Reigning Queen of Burlesque: Jessabelle Thunder
- First Runner-up: Foxy Lexxi Brown
- Second Runner-up: Violette Coquette

==== Award recipients ====
- Best Debut: Matthew Pope
- Best Debut Runner-up: Nami Flare
- Best Small Group: Viola Panìk & Mister Punch
- Best Large Group: La Maison Lust
- Most Classic: Jessabelle Thunder
- Most Comedic: Viola Panìk & Mister Punch
- Most Dazzling: Qween Quan
- Most Innovative: Margot Manifesto
