= Helsinki Burlesque Festival =

Annual burlesque festival held in Helsinki, Finland

Coordinates: 60°9′50.57″N 24°56′43.11″E

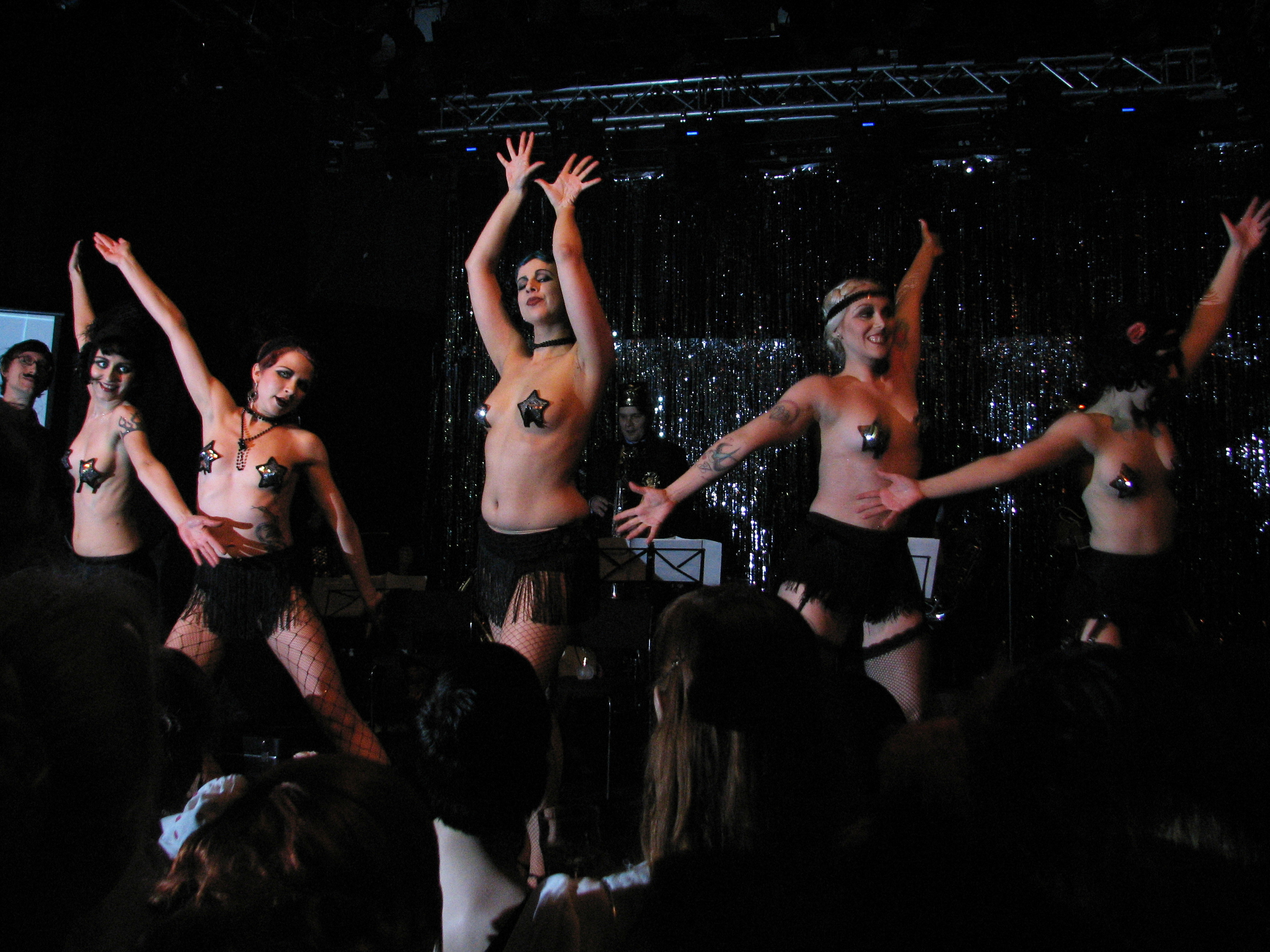
A burlesque performance at the Helsinki Burlesque Festival.

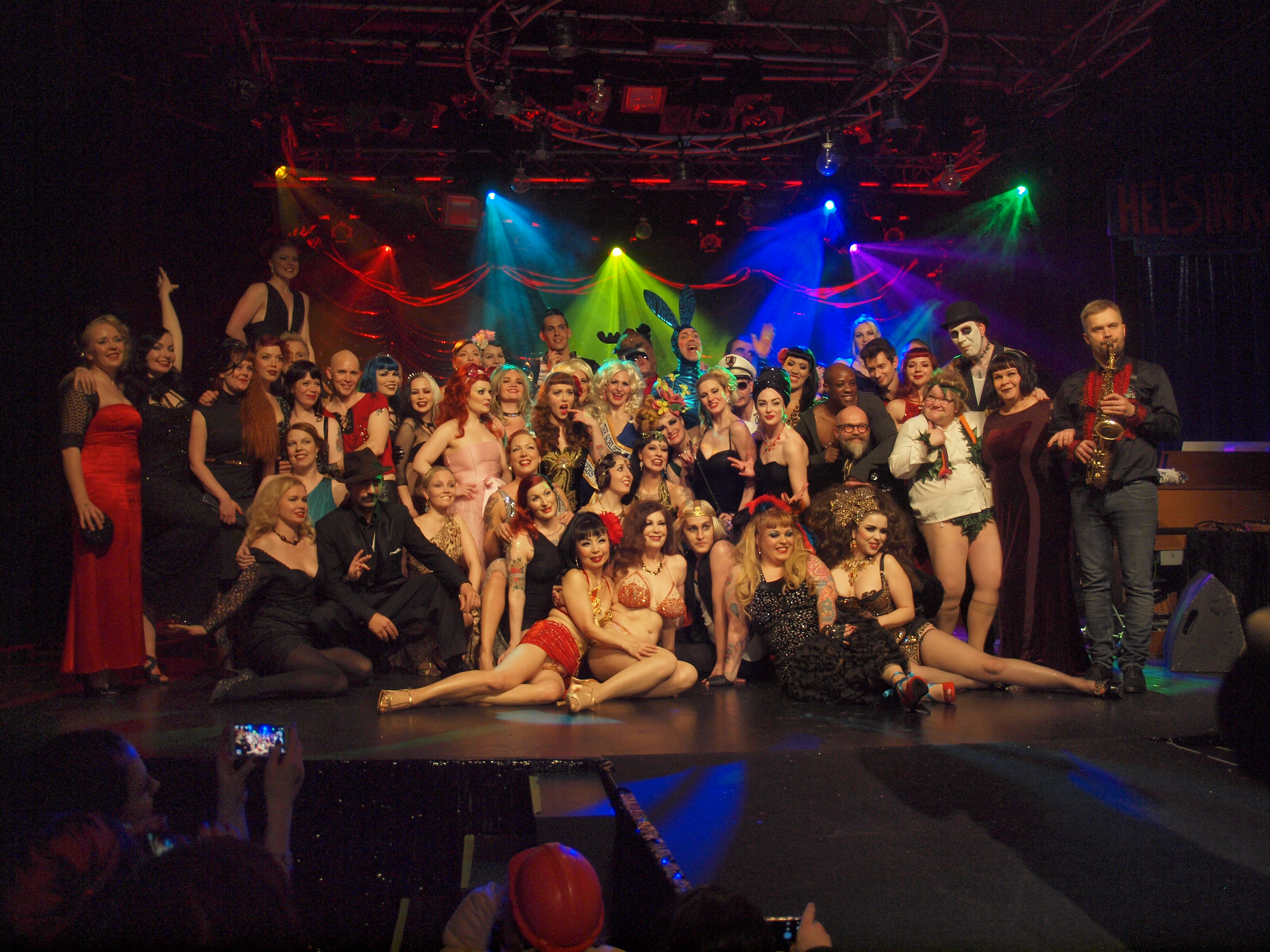
A group picture of all the performers at Helsinki Burlesque Festival 2015.

The Helsinki Burlesque Festival was an annual burlesque festival held in Helsinki, Finland, in late winter every year. The festival was started in 2008 by the Hulapirates Team (Bettie Blackheart, Frank Doggenstein and Kiki Hawaiji). Since 2010, the festival was produced by Bettie Blackheart and Frank Doggenstein from the Helsinki Burlesque organization. The final festival was held in 2017.

The festival lasted approximately one week, starting on Friday and ending on Sunday the following week, although not all days had events. The main event was held on Saturday on the second week, and consisted mainly of performances by various burlesque artists. Events were held in:

- 2008: Restaurant Kaisaniemi, Kaisaniemi, Helsinki
- 2009: Culture Arena Gloria, Kaartinkaupunki, Helsinki
- 2010: Culture Arena Gloria, Helsinki
- 2011: Culture Arena Gloria, Helsinki (29 January - 6 February 2011)
- 2012: Culture Arena Gloria, Helsinki (10 - 18 February 2012)
- 2013: Culture Arena Gloria, Helsinki (1 - 2 March 2013)
- 2014: Culture Arena Gloria, Helsinki (26 February - 2 March 2014)
- 2015: Culture Arena Gloria, Helsinki (25 February - 1 March 2015)
- 2016: Culture Arena Gloria, Helsinki (2 - 6 March 2016)
- 2017: Culture Arena Gloria, Helsinki (3 - 4 March 2017)

As well as the main event, the festival also included drawing classes and workshops for aspiring burlesque artists. Related exhibitions are also held around Helsinki. The festival is credited with kick-starting a burgeoning burlesque industry in Helsinki.
