= Palomino Club =

The name Palomino Club may refer to:

- Palomino Club (Las Vegas), a strip club founded in the 1960s
- Palomino Club (North Hollywood), an influential performance venue in Los Angeles that closed in 1995
