= Strippergate =

Strippergate may refer to:

- Strippergate (Canada)
- Strippergate (Seattle)
- 2015 University of Louisville basketball sex scandal, in which a team staffer was found to have paid large amounts for adult entertainment for players and recruits
- Operation G-Sting, an FBI investigation into bribes and unreported campaign contributions in Nevada and California
