= House of Lancaster (strip clubs) =

Toronto strip-clubs

- Industry: Adult entertainment
- Founder: Spiro and Terry Koumoudouros
- Number of locations: 2
- Area served: Greater Toronto Area
- Website: thehouseoflancaster.ca

The House of Lancaster is the name of both a current strip club in Toronto that opened in 1983, and a former strip club in Etobicoke that operated from 1982 to 2017.

Both were opened by Spiro and Terry Koumoudouros.

== Ownership ==
Both clubs were opened by brothers Spiro and Terry Koumoudouros and were ranked the third best strip club by BlogTO in 2012.

== Etobicoke club ==
The House of Lancaster in Etobicoke was a strip club located in a residential area on The Queensway. Most of the club was occupied by female dancers targeting male customers, although the Foxxes Den-branded west wing of the building employed male dancers targeting female customers.

The club opened in 1982, and was initially branded as the Hollywood Tavern.

A male dancer was arrested and charged with sexual assault in 2009. The conviction of another male dancer in 2016 was quashed at the appeal court in 2019 granting him a right to a retrial. The Etobicoke club was the scene of three shootings that occurred in 2013, 2014 and 2015. The 2014 shooting happened on December 30, when a man was shot multiple times outside the club. The shooting prompted residents to increase their advocacy against the presence of a strip club in a residential area.

The club was sold in 2017, and demolished by the new owners Parallax real estate company on February 21, 2018.

== Toronto club ==
The Toronto House of Lancaster strip club is located at 1215 Bloor Street in Bloordale, Toronto and club opened in 1983. It closed during start of COVID-19 pandemic, but opened in August 2020 to customers who make phone reservations and wore face masks.

In 2011, the club took hosted a poetry reading event as part of the 100,000 Poets for a Change event, featuring a reading by city councillor Ana Bailão.

The club featured in episode of Degrassi High television series when fictional characters Joey Jeremiah, Snake, and Wheels decided to visit a strip club.

== See also ==
- Zanzibar Tavern
- The Brass Rail (Toronto)
- Le Strip
