= Brent Jordan =

American author (born 1963)

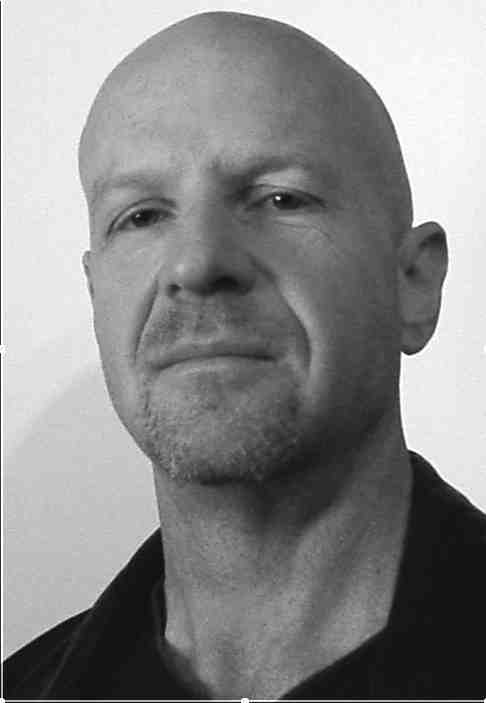
Brent Jordan

Brent Kenton Jordan (born August 15, 1963, in Santa Ana Heights, California) is an American author, best known for his book about his 20 years as a bouncer at such clubs as Cheetah's Topless Club in Las Vegas.

== Biography ==
Jordan was the fourth of five children. His mother was a horse trainer/riding instructor, and his father Dave Jordan was head football coach at Grossmont College in San Diego. Jordan dropped out of school in the 9th grade. During his teens, he worked as a Kenpo Karate instructor, then later served in the U.S. Army. After being discharged at 21, he opened a karate school/gym and took weekend security jobs at local nightclubs. This developed into a career as he worked as a bouncer, DJ and sometimes manager at various night clubs and strip clubs, including Pacers Strip Club in San Diego, Crazy Horse Saloon and the Palomino Club.

In 1991, he took a job at the just-opened "Cheetah's" strip club, where he worked until 2003, and was one of the witnesses in a major FBI sting against club owner Michael Galardi and several members of the Las Vegas and San Diego city councils. In 2004, he wrote a book about his observations of the case and the general flow of life in a strip club. As of 2006, the book is in its fourth printing, and Jordan is frequently cited in the media in stories about the adult entertainment industry.

Jordan is also trained in Muay Thai kick boxing, Brazilian Jiu Jitsu and NHB fighting. He occasionally competed, with his most notable match being a close loss against Chuck Liddell, who was later named as UFC Light Heavyweight champion.

== Writing ==
- Stripped: Twenty Years of Secrets from Inside the Strip Club, 2004, ISBN 0-9703441-2-0
- The Chivalry Code: Discussions on Becoming a Man in a Modern World, 2007. Satsu Press. ISBN 0-9703441-3-9
- "The Viking On Stamford Bridge: A Heroic Saga", 2020. Satsu Press. ASIN : B08J9MQJGD

== See also ==
- Cheetah's
- Strippergate – About the FBI's "Operation G-Sting"
- Palomino Club (Las Vegas)
