= Filmores Hotel =

Former hotel and adult entertainment club in Toronto, Ontario, Canada

Coordinates: 43.6576°N 79.3734°W

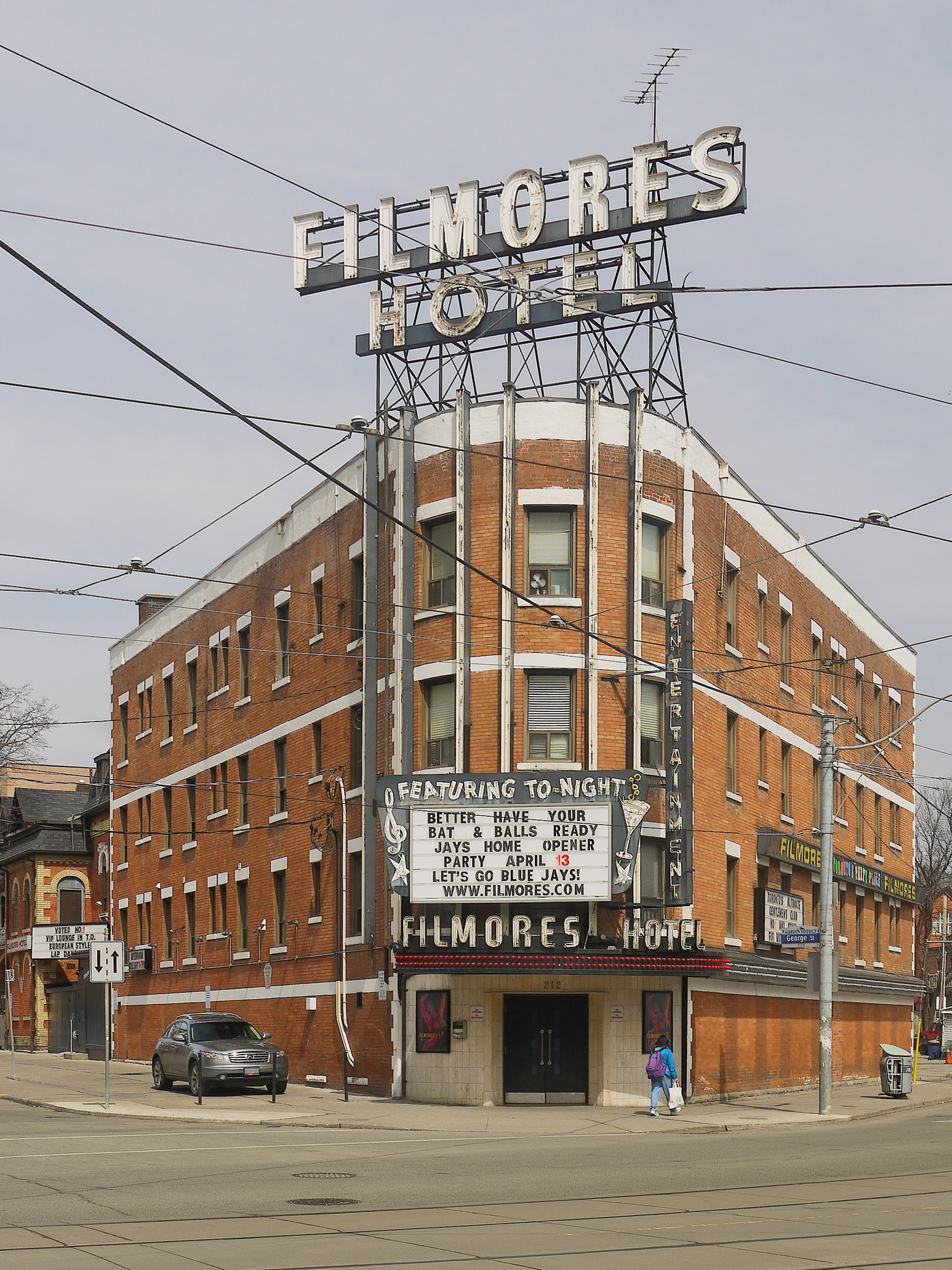
- Filmores Hotel in 2015
- Former names: Wilton Court Apartments; Wilton Court Private Hotel; Wilton Court Hotel; Westover Hotel; Stage 212

General information
- Type: Hotel and strip club
- Location: 212 Dundas Street East, Toronto, Ontario, Canada
- Completed: 1870s (Tasker House); 1913 (hotel addition)
- Opened: 1913
- Closed: January 31, 2026

Design and construction
- Architects: Symons and Rae (1913)

Filmores Hotel was a hotel and strip club at 212 Dundas Street East in Toronto, Ontario, Canada. Located at the northeast corner of Dundas and George streets in the Garden District, the building incorporated part of a house dating from the 1870s and had operated as a hotel since the early 20th century. The establishment became Filmores in the mid-1980s and operated as a budget hotel and adult-entertainment club until its closure on January 31, 2026.

== History ==
=== Tasker House ===
The property formed part of the former Moss Park estate assembled by businessman William Allan during the early 19th century. Following the subdivision of the estate, merchant Henry Tasker acquired the property in 1872 and constructed a house at the northeast corner of Wilton Crescent, now Dundas Street East, and George Street.

=== Wilton Court ===
In 1912, James Taylor Benor purchased the property for $14,250. The following year, a building permit was issued for a three-storey addition to the existing rooming house. Designed by the architectural firm of Symons and Rae, the addition extended along Dundas Street and incorporated part of the earlier Tasker residence.

The establishment was initially known as the Wilton Court Apartments. Municipal assessment records described it as a "private hotel" in 1914, and it was advertised as the Wilton Court Private Hotel in 1915. It provided residential accommodation, a dining room and meal services.

The Benor family retained ownership until 1945. The establishment continued operating as the Wilton Court Hotel after the Second World War and was listed under that name into the 1950s.

=== Westover Hotel ===
By 1959, the establishment had been renamed the Westover Hotel, with the new name appearing in the following year's Toronto city directory.

=== Stage 212 and Filmores ===
In 1980, the property was sold to Stage 212 Incorporated. During this period it housed the Stage 212 adult-entertainment venue as well as Fly By Night, a lesbian bar, while continuing to provide hotel accommodation.

Filmores Hotel first appeared at 212 Dundas Street East in Toronto city directories in 1985–86. Its adult-entertainment venue, subsequently promoted as Filmores Gentlemen's Club and Filmores Adult Playground, occupied the lower portion of the building, with hotel rooms above.

The premises were used as a filming location for television productions, music videos and films. The hotel advertised inexpensive rooms, housekeeping and laundry services.

=== Architecture and heritage status ===
The building incorporated portions of the 1870s Henry Tasker House and a three-storey addition designed by Symons and Rae in 1913 for use as an apartment hotel.

The City of Toronto added 212 Dundas Street East to its Heritage Register in July 2016. The property was subsequently identified as a contributing property in the Garden District Heritage Conservation District.

The property's identified cultural heritage value concerned the former Wilton Court Hotel and surviving portions of the Tasker House.

=== Redevelopment and closure ===
The property was sold to a developer in 2020. Subsequent plans called for residential redevelopment incorporating retained portions of the heritage buildings. Although Filmores' signage was not identified as a heritage attribute, the plans contemplated preserving or commemorating elements associated with the establishment.

In January 2026, Filmores announced that it would close because of the planned redevelopment. The business described the closure as ending approximately 45 years of adult entertainment at the site. Its final show was held on January 31, 2026.

The contents of the hotel and club, including furniture, fixtures and equipment, were subsequently sold at auction. Filmores' operators expressed interest in reopening elsewhere in downtown Toronto, although municipal zoning restrictions on new adult-entertainment establishments presented a potential obstacle.

== See also ==
- List of strip clubs
- Brass Rail
- Zanzibar Tavern
