= Silverado (gay bar) =

Gay bar and strip club in Portland, Oregon, U.S.

- Logo

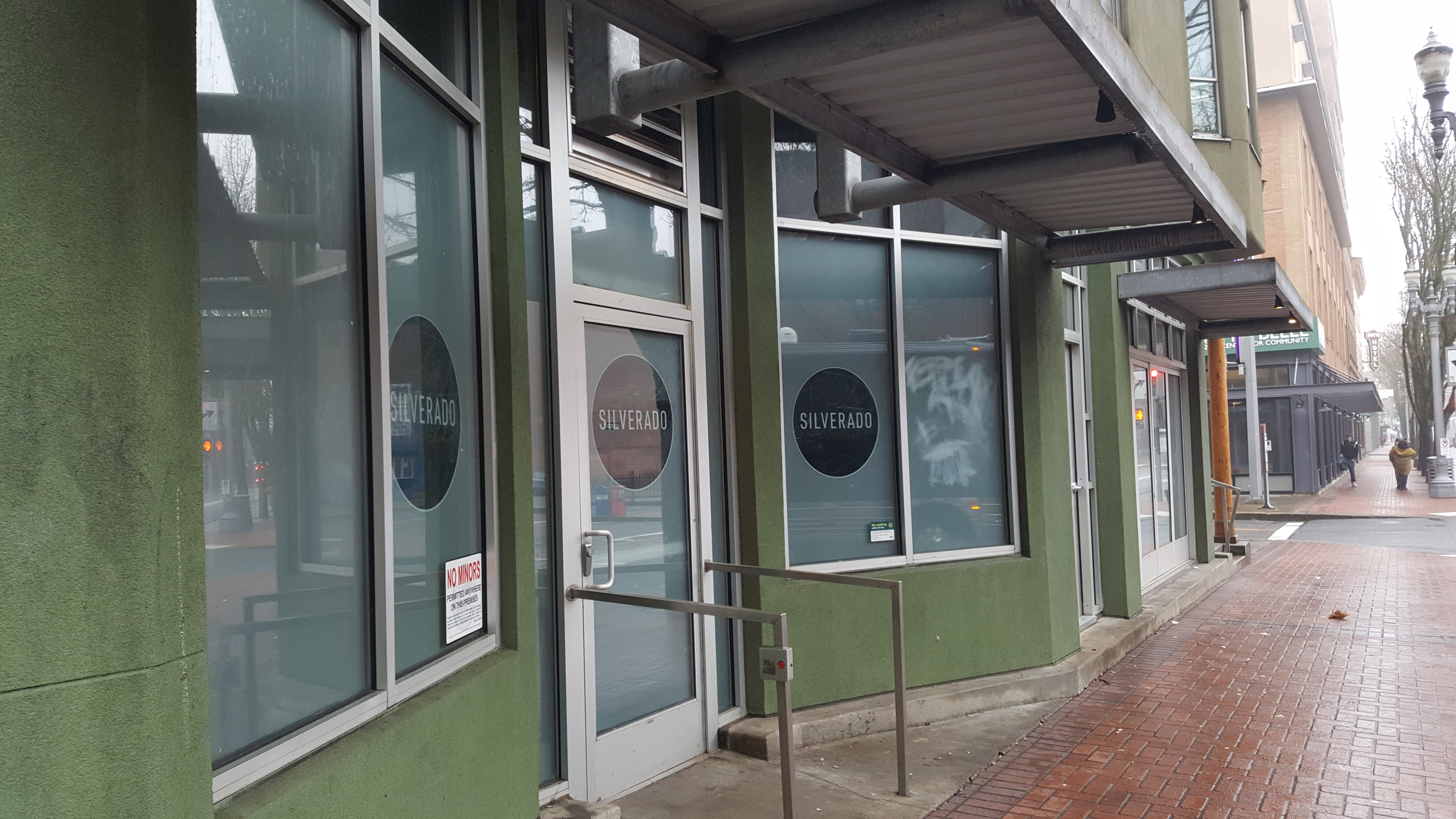
- The bar's front exterior in 2019

- Location in Portland, Oregon
- Former names: Flossie's
- Address: 610 Northwest Couch Street
- Location: Portland, Oregon, U.S.
- Coordinates: 45°31′13″N 122°40′26″W
- Type: Gay bar; strip club

Website
- www.silveradopdx.com

Silverado, formerly known as Flossie's, is a gay bar and strip club in Portland, Oregon's Old Town Chinatown neighborhood, in the United States.

== Description and history ==
Silverado, Portland's only gay strip club, after the closure of Three Sisters Tavern in 2004 and prior to Stag PDX's opening in 2015, has existed for nearly 30 years. Formerly called Flossie's, it was originally located below a gay bathhouse in what is now the Crystal Hotel. This was in the area of downtown Portland known as Burnside Triangle, or "Gay Triangle", for its many gay and gay-friendly businesses. The club relocated to 318 Southwest 3rd Avenue, in January 2008.

In March 2018, Silverado confirmed the business would leave its location at 3rd Avenue on March 31, after ten years. The bar relocated to 610 Northwest Couch Street, in the Old Town Chinatown neighborhood, in December 2018.

In his 2019 "overview of Portland's LGBTQ+ nightlife for the newcomer", Andrew Jankowski of the Portland Mercury wrote: "The Pacific Northwest's longest-operating male strip club moved last winter, setting up shop next to the Star Theater in a former sports bar. It doesn't look like much on the surface, because the real party is in the basement. There aren't as many poles as the previous location, but there's no shortage of sexy male dancers."

== Policies ==
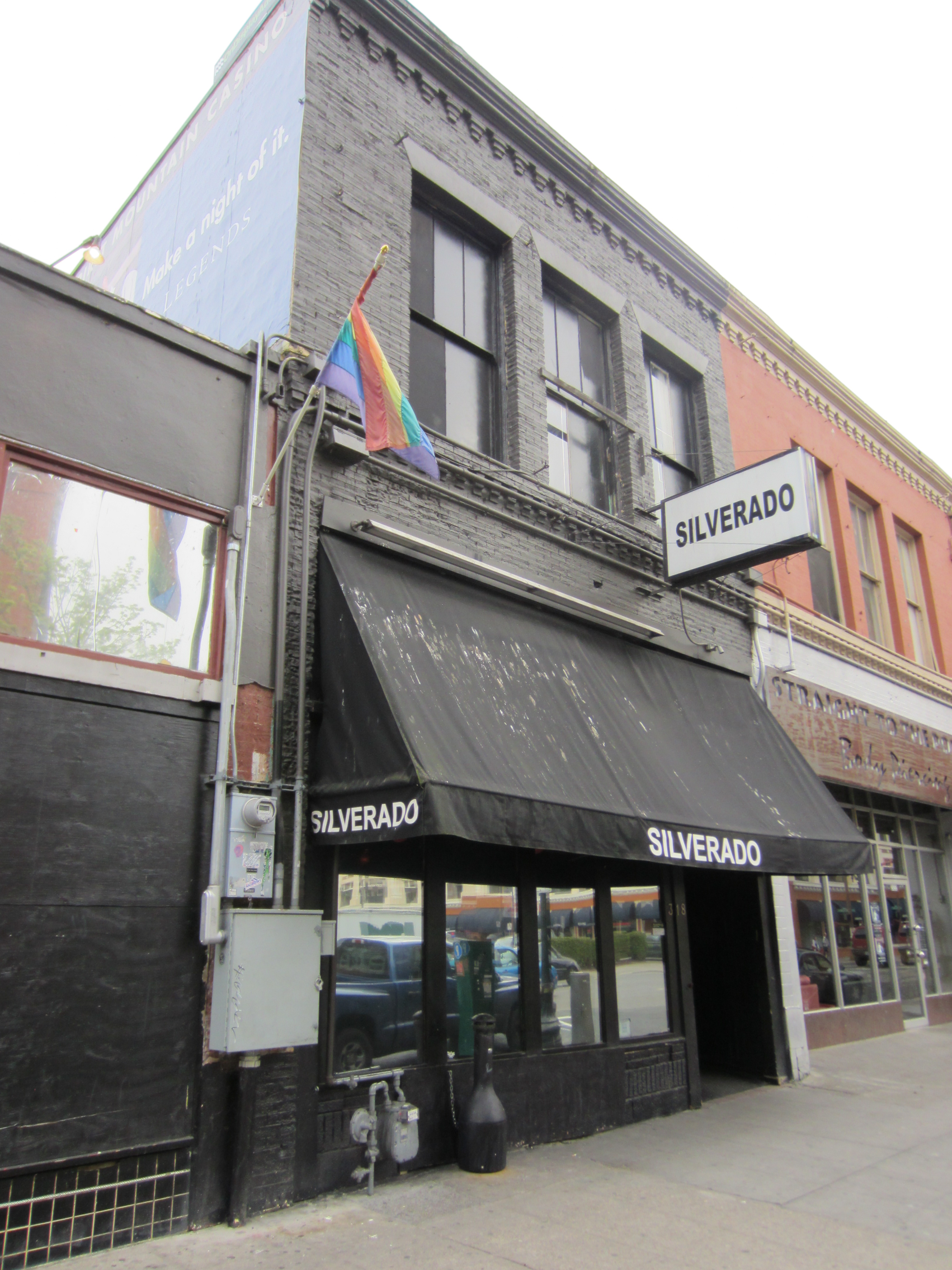
Exterior of the bar at its former location on 3rd Avenue (2013)

In 2012, Silverado attracted attention for enforcing unequal cover charges every Friday and Saturday, charging male patrons $3 and female patrons $5. A spokesman for the company compared the difference in price to similar "ladies' night" events in which men pay more to enter a club than women. Furthermore, he said in an interview published by The Portland Mercury: "Every other day of the week, the entry price is the same for everyone. We require a nominal fee because we don't want people just coming in to oogle and leave. We need to make a profit!"

The bar does not allow bachelorette parties due to complaints from male patrons who "don't like groups of screaming and giggling women", even posting signage which specifically reads, "No Bachelorette Parties". The entrance to Silverado also has a sign that reads, "If you're here, you're queer", informing heterosexual men that they "aren't welcome". The same spokesman said of the policy, "This isn't a discrimination issue, it's different. We're just trying to create a comfortable environment for our customers."

== Reception ==
Thomas Lauderdale, known for his work with the Portland-based band Pink Martini, has shared his affinity for the club and keeps a collection of photographs of guests who accompanied him to the venue, including Gus Van Sant and Rufus Wainwright.

== See also ==
- Culture of Portland, Oregon
- List of LGBTQ bars
- List of strip clubs
