= Three Sisters Tavern =

Defunct gay bar and strip club in Portland, Oregon, U.S.

- Six Tits
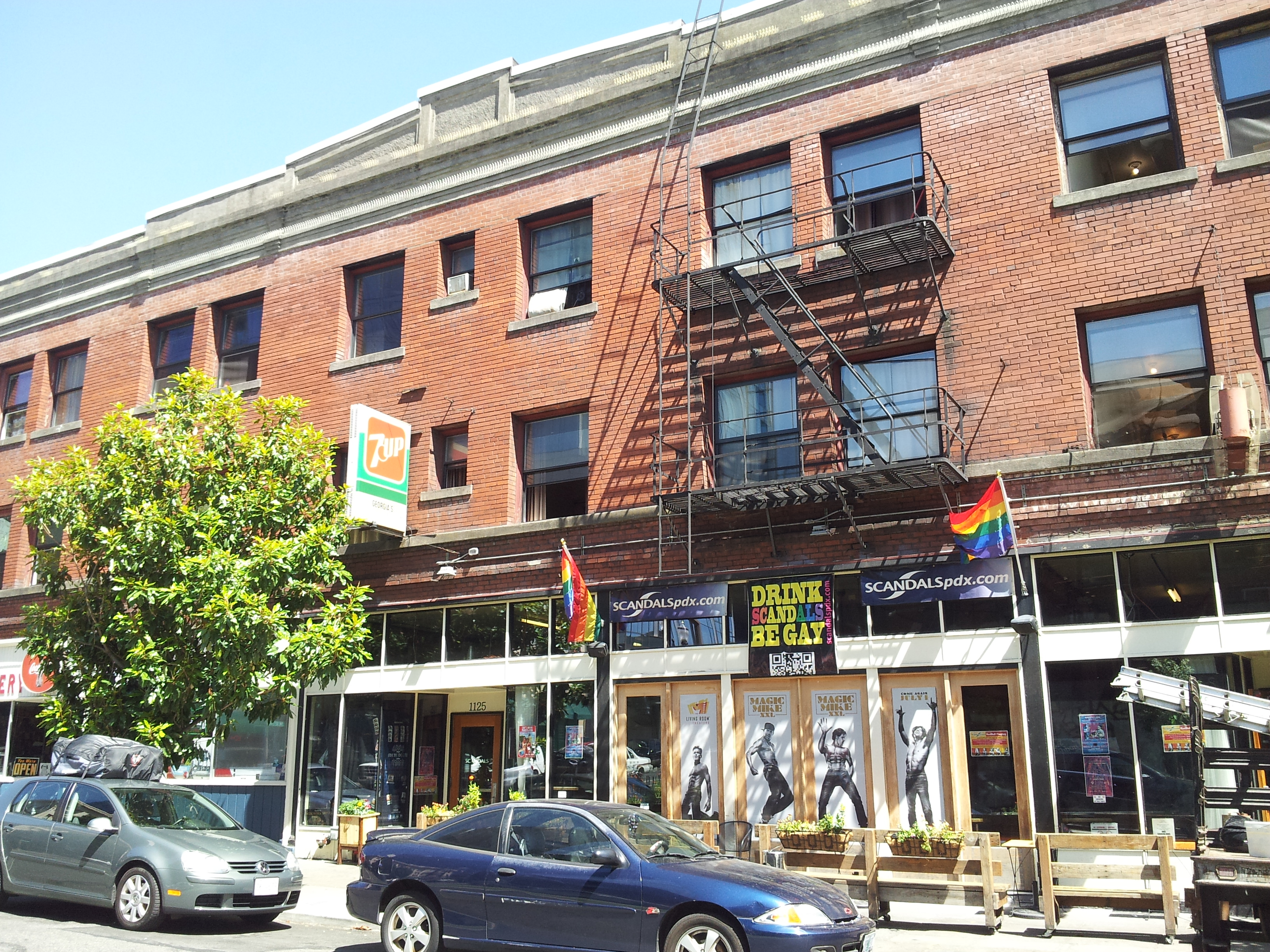
- 1125 Southwest Stark Street in 2015; formerly occupied by Three Sisters Tavern, the space now houses Scandals, a gay bar.

- Location in Portland, Oregon
- Address: 1125 Southwest Stark Street
- Location: Portland, Oregon, United States
- Coordinates: 45.52260°N 122.68276°W
- Owner: John P. Katchis (d. 1964) and Georgia Lykos Katchis (d. 1997); Athanasios "Saki" Elftherios Katsavopoulos (d. 2010) and Sotiria "Sandra" Katchis Katsavopoulos
- Type: Gay bar; strip club

Construction
- Opened: 1964
- Closed: 2004

Three Sisters Tavern, sometimes abridged as Three Sisters and nicknamed "Six Tits", was a gay bar and strip club in Portland, Oregon, United States. The bar was founded in 1964 and began catering to Portland's gay community in 1997 following the deaths of the original owners. The business evolved into a strip club featuring an all-male revue. Also frequented by women, sometimes for bachelorette parties, Three Sisters was considered a hub of Portland's nightlife before closing in 2004.

== Description and history ==
Three Sisters Tavern opened in 1964 as a family business. John P. Katchis and his wife Georgia owned and operated the business until his death four months later (1964) and her death in 1997. The couple were survived by their three daughters, one of whom, Sotiria "Sandra" Katsavopoulos, along with her husband Athanasios "Saki" Katsavopoulos, acquired ownership and began catering to Portland's gay community, eventually turning Three Sisters into a gay bar and strip club.

The bar was located at 1125 Southwest Stark Street and featured an all-male nude revue, a dance floor, and shows. The Portland Mercury described it as an "institution of stiff drinks and stiffer male dancers", where "hot men perform theatrical and acrobatic stripteases on stage, then get naked and wag their penises in your face". Dancers often were costumed as angels, businessmen, construction workers, cowboys, police officers, or United Parcel Service (UPS) delivery men. After Three Sisters closed in 2004, some of the featured dancers began performing at other Portland venues, including Jefferson Theatre.

Three Sisters catered both to gay men and to women, who sometimes attended as part of bachelorette parties. The Oregonian described the "bachelorette bunnies" who used to frequent this bar as well as two others: Silverado and the Viewpoint. The paper's Lee Williams wrote:

Hippoty-hoppity they go – these fuzzy, suburban-soft little critters jump all over Stark Street and the Viewpoint running wild to celebrate one last night of 'Sex in the City' singledom. They crowd downtown's male strip-club stages holding dollar bills up to get a glimpse of a few last carrots before hopping down that wedding-trail home. They are particularly agile small mammals, able to hold a drink and a friend's hair while she's throwing up.

Rufus Wainwright recalled accompanying Thomas Lauderdale, the musician known for his work with the Portland-based band Pink Martini, to the club.

== Reception ==
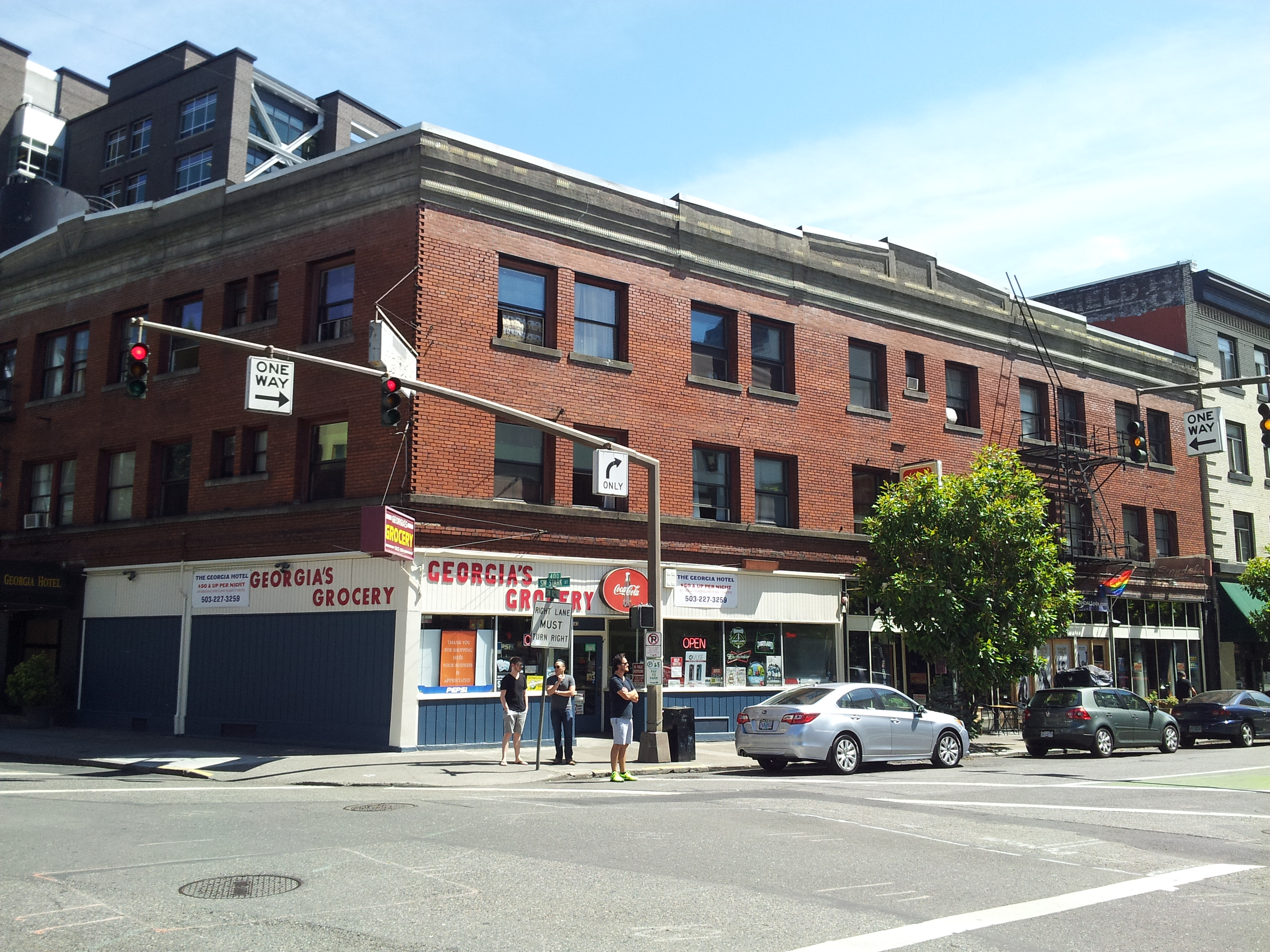
The corner of Southwest 12th Avenue and Stark Street in 2015. The building once housed Three Sisters Tavern in the space now occupied by Scandals, a gay bar.

In their book Secret Portland, Oregon: The Unique Guidebook to Portland's Hidden Sites, Sounds and Tastes (2003), Ann Carroll Burgess and Linda Rutenberg called Three Sisters "the hub of Portland's gay bar nightlife", offering a "great" dance floor and "impressive" entertainment. The Portland Mercury's Katie Shimer called the bar "one million percent fun" and said, "Whatever your fetish, the strippers deliver ... Make sure you stuff your pockets with singles, 'cause you'll be spending at least a good hour at the rack." Similarly, the Seattle alternative weekly The Stranger said the venue was "perhaps the funnest place in all the world ... especially when the fellers trot on stage in a vast array of hilarious costumes". The paper's Wm. Steven Humphrey wrote, "These nudie cuties were born to entertain, and prove it by leaping from stage to tabletop, hanging naked upside down (by the tops of their FEET!!), and if you're extremely lucky, gingerly lifting a dollar bill off your forehead with their ass cheeks. Now that's talent!" Byron Beck of Willamette Week said the dancers at Three Sisters "[turned] a quaint queer tavern into the most mouthwatering of watering holes in P-town". The paper also called the club "the best place to view wiener-wiggling".

== See also ==
- Culture of Portland, Oregon
- List of LGBTQ bars
- List of strip clubs
