= Jiggles =

Former strip club in Tualatin, Oregon, U.S.

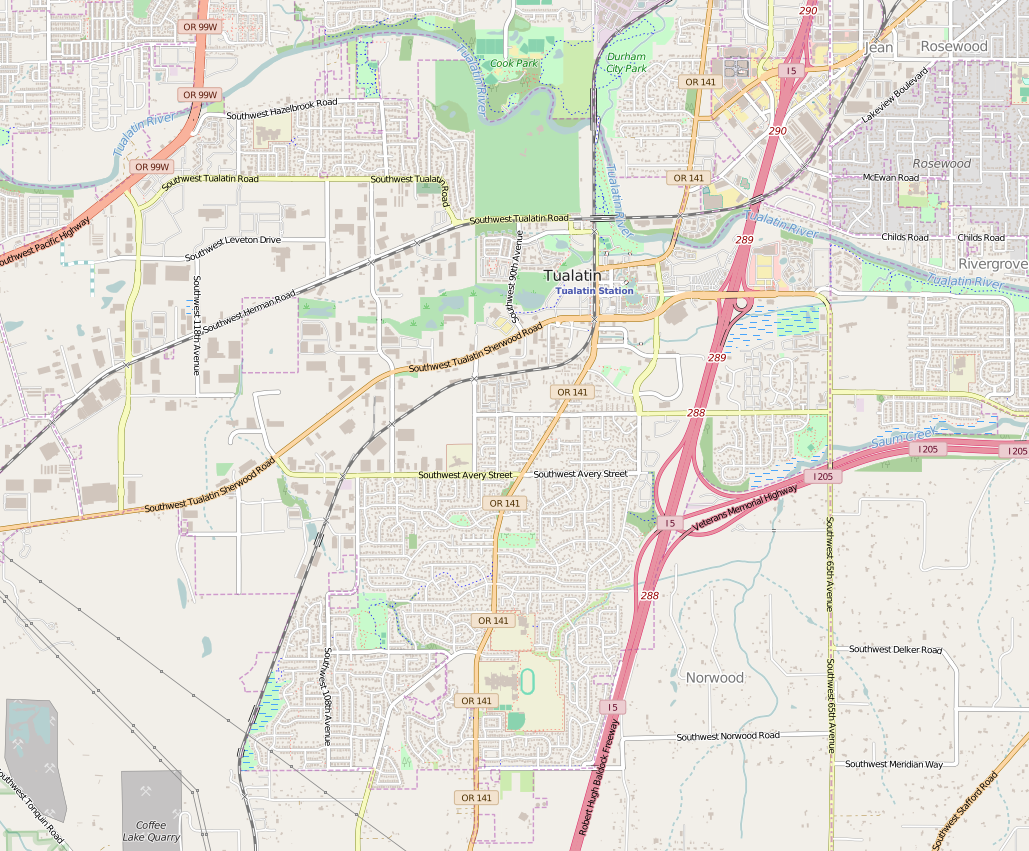
- Location in Tualatin, Oregon
- Location: Tualatin, Oregon, United States
- Coordinates: 45.3842°N 122.7531°W
- Type: Strip club

Construction
- Opened: January 1984
- Expanded: January 1987
- Closed: June 2014
- Demolished: 2014

Jiggles, sometimes called Jiggles Strip Club, was a strip club in Tualatin, Oregon, in the United States. In March 2014, Jiggles received media attention when Jake Stoneking, a 19 year old diagnosed with medulloblastoma, included a visit to the club on his list of activities to complete before his death. The club shut down and the building in which it was housed was demolished later that year.

== Description and history ==
Jiggles was located near Interstate 5's exit 289 in Tualatin. The strip club was sited on property owned by Dean and Rona McBale, who also owned the adjacent historic home known as the Nyberg house; both buildings were within the city's urban-renewal district. Unlike most strip clubs in the United States, Jiggles did not serve alcohol after losing its liquor license, and was therefore accessible to people aged 18 and older. According to Oregon Business, the club marketed to people aged 18 to 21. It sold coffee, energy drinks, and juices, and its tag line was "The Best Wiggles are at Jiggles".

In March 2014, Jiggles received media attention when Jake Stoneking, a 19 year old diagnosed with medulloblastoma, included a visit to the club on his "bucket list", or a list of activities someone wants to do before they die. WCSX and WKFS, based in Detroit and Cincinnati, respectively, said, "[Jiggles] only has two stars on Yelp. There's no word on how Jake enjoyed his experience, but it's awesome that he clearly has a sense of humor, even in a tragic situation." Following Stoneking's visit, Jiggles' general manager told Daily News (New York), "I am beyond flattered and I hope that he had an amazing time." The manager promised a "special experience" if Stoneking were able to visit a second time.

Jiggles was torn down in 2014, in a campaign led by mayor Lou Ogden, to make way for a Cabela's store as part of the Nyberg Rivers shopping complex. The complex's spokesperson said he wished Jiggles would have shut down sooner but "they did not cooperate". The strip club's glass front doors, with included "art", and the bouncer's chair were secured and donated to the Tualatin Historic Society (THS) for sale. THS quipped, "Ideas for their next life have been many, but not on the list is permanent display at the heritage center."

== Reception ==
Jiggles existed "much to the chagrin of some city officials". THS called the club "infamous" and its signage "an eyesore for Tualatin's family-friendly image". Ogden considers Jiggles' replacement with Cabela's a success during his tenure, as mentioned in his "Voter Guide" entry for a mayoral election.

== See also ==
- List of strip clubs
