= RCI Hospitality Holdings =

Adult entertainment operating company

RCI Hospitality Holdings, Inc
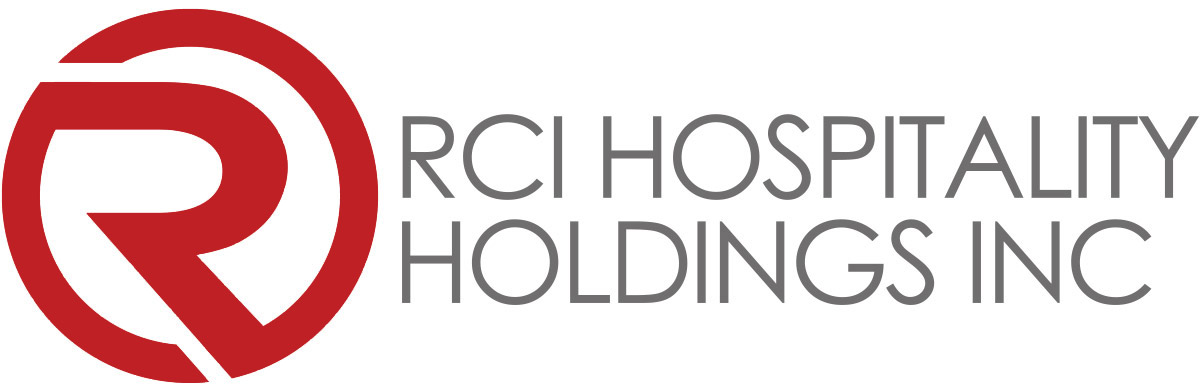

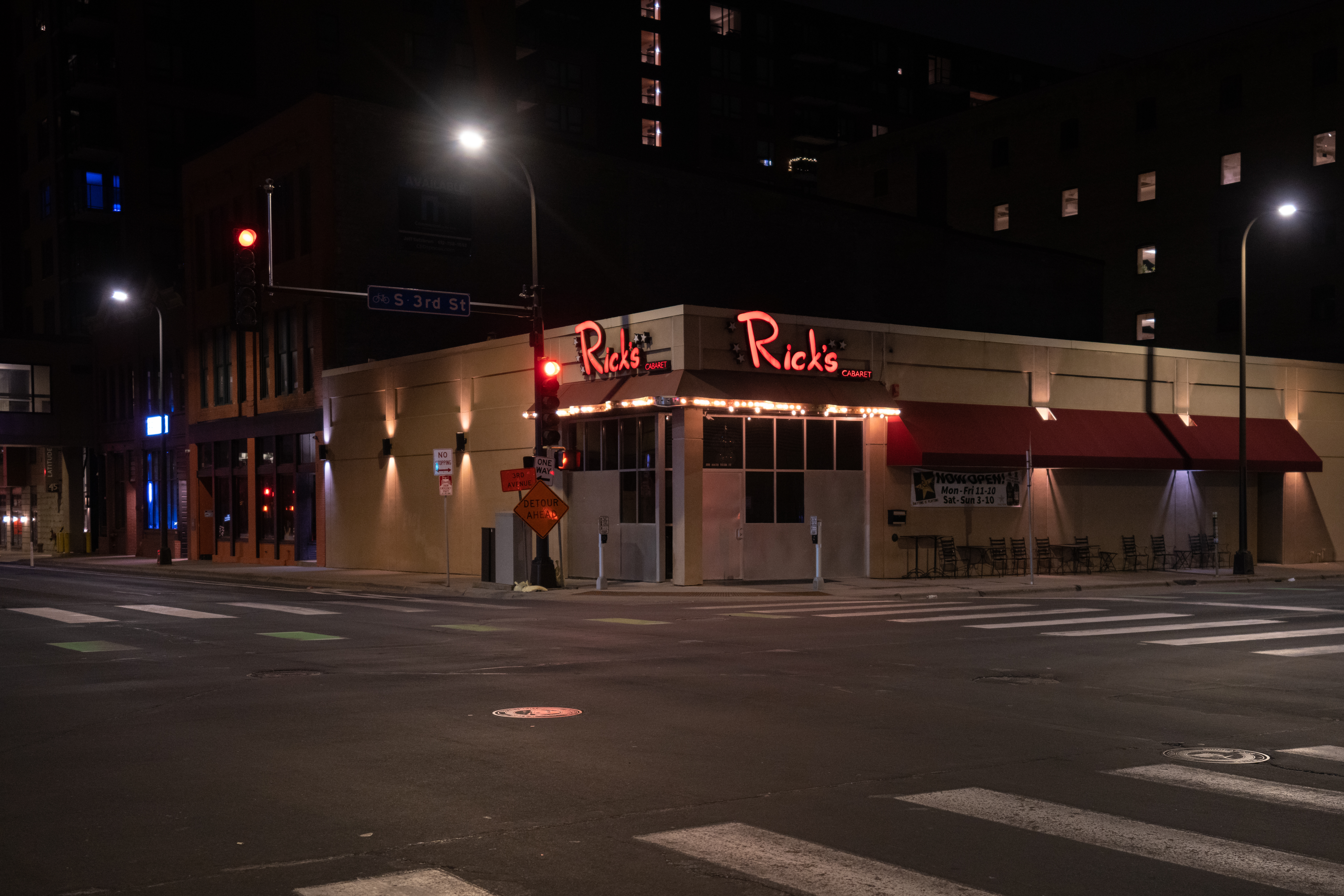
- Rick's Cabaret strip club in Minneapolis, 2021
- Type: Public
- Traded as: Nasdaq: RICK
- Industry: Strip clubs, nightclubs, adult websites, American Restaurant chain
- Founded: 1983; 43 years ago
- Founder: Robert Watters, Eric Langan
- Headquarters: Houston, Texas, U.S.
- Area served: Texas, New York, Florida, Arizona, North Carolina, South Carolina, Minnesota, Pennsylvania, Illinois, Colorado, Indiana, Kentucky, Louisiana, Maine, Michigan
- Key people: Eric Langan (CEO), Travis Reese (EVP), Bradley Chhay (CFO)
- Revenue: ▼US$279 million (2025)
- Net income: ▲US$10.8 million (2025)
- Website: rcihospitality.com

RCI Hospitality Holdings, Inc. (previously Rick's Cabaret International, Inc.), through its subsidiaries, operates strip clubs, nightclubs, sports bars/restaurants, and a media and convention company that serves the adult club industry. RCI went public with an IPO in 1995 is listed on The NASDAQ Global Market under the symbol RICK.

== History ==
The company was founded in 1983 by Robert Watters and is based in Houston, Texas. In 1998, the company merged with Taurus, Inc., which owned the XTC Cabaret chain and was controlled by Eric Langan, who eventually became the RCI's president and CEO in 1999. Langan acquired his first gentlemen's club in Texas at age 21 with $40,000 from the sale of his baseball card collection. Subsequently, RCI expanded inside and outside of Texas to states such as New York, Illinois, Florida, Arizona, Minnesota and others, and entered related businesses, such as sports bars/restaurants and nightclubs.

== Nightclubs ==
RCI owns more than 55 strip clubs under various names for various clienteles. In 2007, the company purchased Tootsie's Cabaret, now the largest strip club in the world.

RCI has been named to Forbes magazine list of the 200 best companies. It has been profiled in The Wall Street Journal, Fortune, MarketWatch, Corporate Board Member, SmartMoney, The New York Daily News, USA Today as well as other publications.

Rick's Cabaret in New York City Steakhouse was listed in Zagat's New York Nightlife and included in the TONY 100 list of fine Manhattan dining establishments by Time Out New York.

Entertainment sites Gothamist, Thrillist, Complex, Miami New Times, Broward New Times, Southflorida.com, and Timeout.com have named clubs operating under RCI to their "Best Strip Club" lists. RCI has also won multiple Awards from Ed Publications including 2019 Club Chain of the Year.

On August 4, 2023, all four RCI clubs in Miami were named to Time Out's "Best strip clubs in Miami" list.

On August 28, 2024, Scarlett's Cabaret Miami was named Overall Club of the Year at the Annual Gentleman's Club Expo in Dallas.

== Restaurants ==
RCI subsidiaries own and operate Bombshells Restaurant & Bar, a military-themed sports bar/restaurant chain first opened in 2013. Bombshells has 13 locations in Texas and one in Colorado. The chain is also known for its “Bombshells Girls” servers, outfitted in skimpy military-themed outfits.

In 2018, Restaurant Business magazine named Bombshells Restaurant & Bar to its "The Future 50" list of fastest-growing concepts.

== 2025 Indictments ==
In September 2025, the Attorney General of New York announced the indictment of five RCI executives in a bribery scheme that ran from 2010 to 2024. The indictment alleges that an RCI comped a New York State Department of Taxation and Finance auditor with travel and free services at RCI's clubs; the auditor then allegedly gave the company preferential treatment in multiple audits sales tax audits, saving the company $8 million.

In response, company counsel Daniel J. Horwitz issued a statement saying, “We are clearly disappointed with the New York Attorney General’s decision to move forward with an indictment and look forward to addressing the allegations. We remind everybody that these indictments contain only allegations, which we believe are baseless. RCI and the individuals involved are presumed innocent and should be allowed to have their day in court.”

In a Securities and Exchange Commission Form 8-K, RCI disclosed that the persons and entities indicted include:

- Parent company RCI Hospitality Holdings, Inc.
- Subsidiaries:
  - Peregrine Enterprises, Inc. (the operator of Rick’s Cabaret in New York City)
  - RCI Dining Services (37th Street), Inc. (the operator of Vivid Cabaret in New York City)
  - RCI 33rd Street Ventures, Inc. (the operator of Hoops Cabaret and Sports Bar in New York City).
- Executives:
  - Eric Langan, Chief Executive Officer
  - Bradley Chhay, Chief Financial Officer
- Three unnamed employees of subsidiaries

== See also ==
- List of strip clubs
