= List of strip clubs =

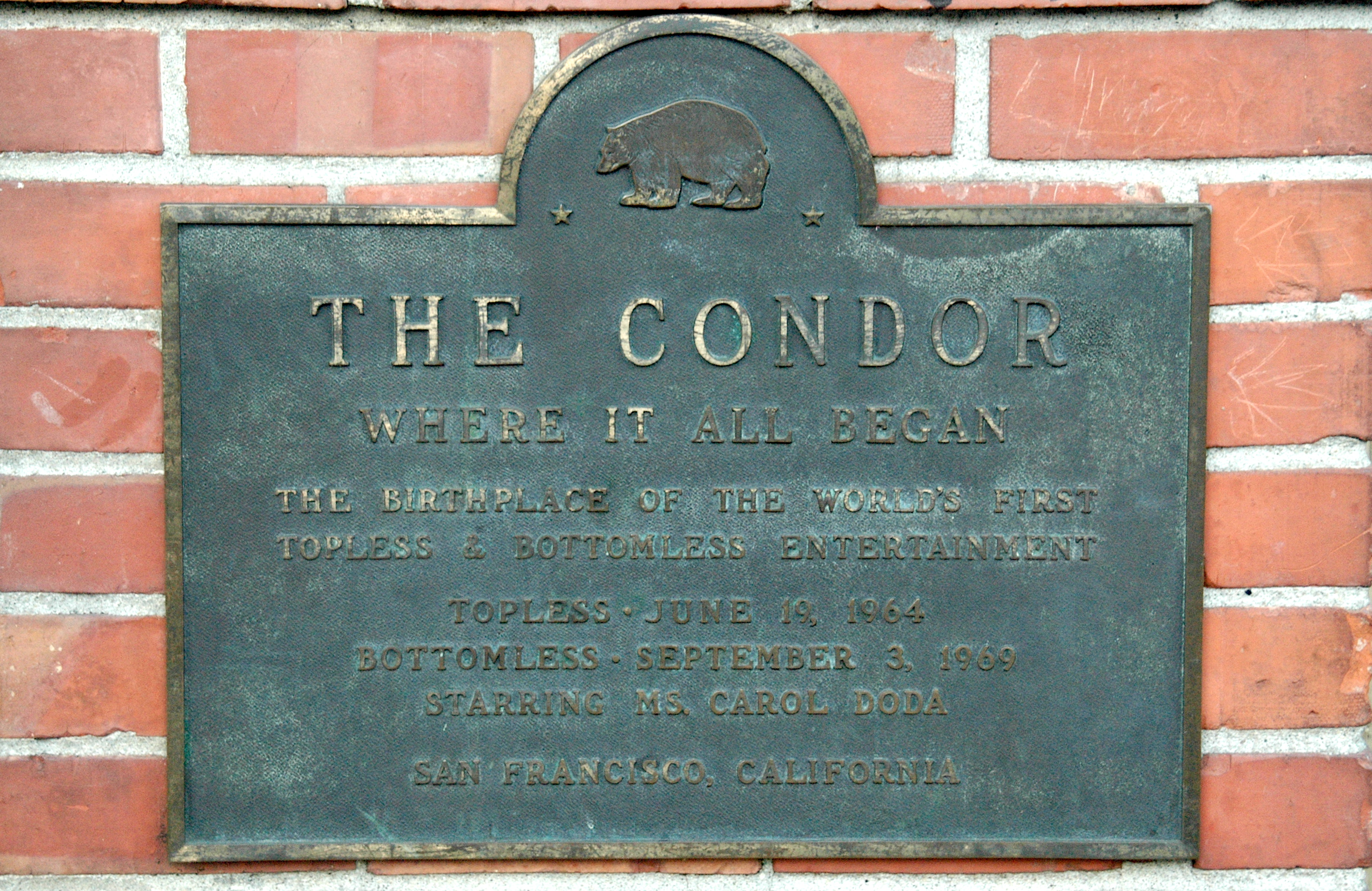
Historical marker at the original Condor Club in San Francisco, California. Today, the club is owned by Deja Vu.

This is a list of notable strip clubs, both active and defunct. A strip club is a venue where strippers provide adult entertainment, predominantly in the form of striptease or other erotic or exotic dances.

== Strip clubs ==
=== Multinational ===
- Deja Vu Services, Inc., is an American company that operates nearly 200 strip clubs in the United States, United Kingdom, Australia, France, Canada, and Mexico.
- Spearmint Rhino is a chain of strip clubs that operates venues throughout the United States, United Kingdom, and Australia. The first Spearmint Rhino was located in Upland, California.

=== Canada ===
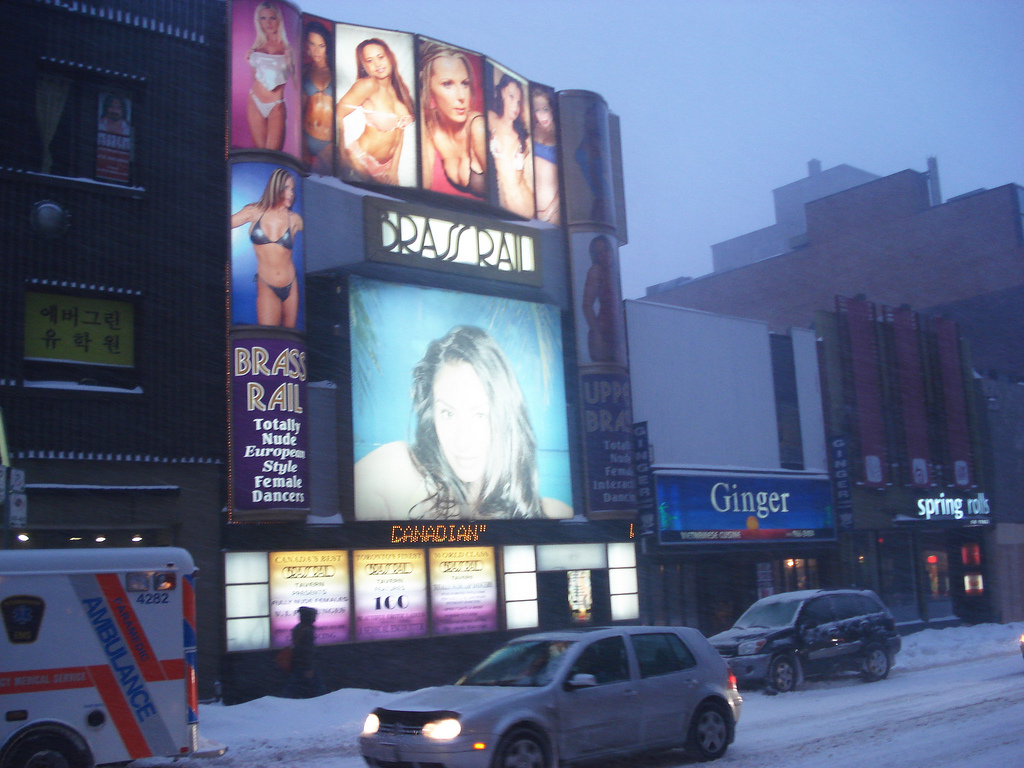
The Brass Rail

- Vancouver, BC: Brandi's Show Lounge, The Granville Strip and No. 5 Orange are all in downtown Vancouver.
- The Brass Rail is a strip club in Toronto, Canada. It is located on Yonge Street just south of Bloor. It is well known as a popular venue for celebrities, especially during the Toronto International Film Festival, which is based at the nearby luxury hotels of Yorkville. Stars that have been observed there include Samuel L. Jackson, Charlize Theron, Alex Rodriguez, and Colin Farrell. The Brass Rail was one of the first venues Paul Shaffer worked in, serving as host and musician.
- Le Strip was a strip club in Toronto, Ontario, Canada. Whilst the club is now closed, former dancers; escorts; bouncers; and promoters of the club, an 18-year-old or older establishment, and the last legal all-ages one of its kind, have expressed an interest within local media of a historical retrospective provided by the City of Toronto concerning the history of licensing of adult clubs and dancers in the city.
- The Zanzibar Tavern in Toronto, Ontario, is an adult entertainment nightclub and local landmark found on Toronto's Yonge Street strip. It is one of Toronto's oldest nightclubs, which celebrated its 60th anniversary in 2020.
- House of Lancaster operated an Etobicoke venue from 1982 to 2017 and operates a Toronto location since 1983.

=== France ===
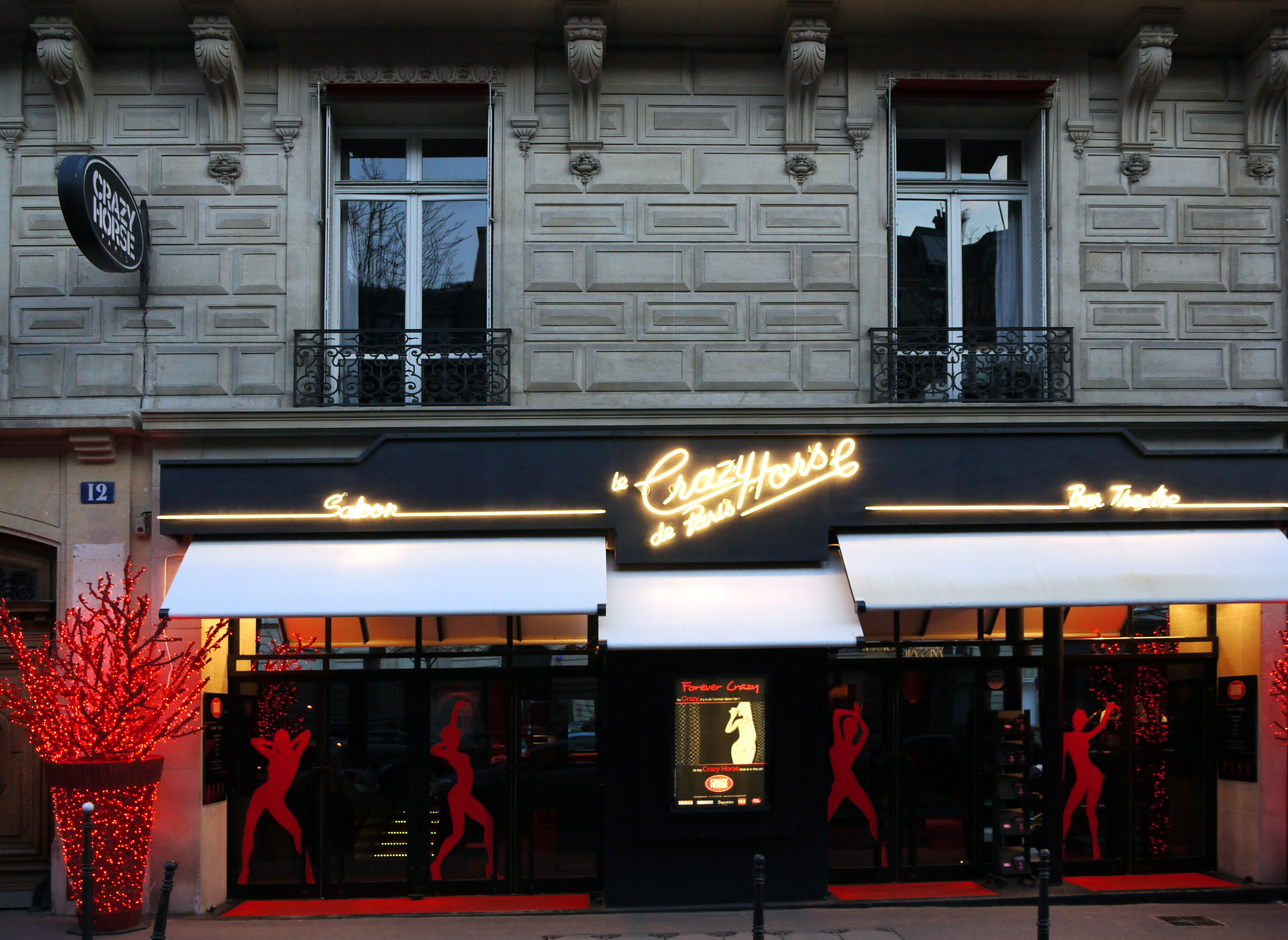
Crazy Horse in 2008

- The [[La Nouvelle Athènes|Nouvelle Athènes]], or Café de la Nouvelle-Athènes, was a café located at 66 Rue Pigalle in the Place Pigalle in the quartier Nouvelle Athènes, Paris, France. It was the setting for many Impressionist paintings, as a result of being the meeting place for painters, including Henri Matisse, Vincent van Gogh and Edgar Degas.
- Le Crazy Horse Saloon or Le Crazy Horse de Paris is a Parisian cabaret and strip club known for its stage shows performed by nude female dancers and for the diverse range of magic and variety "turns" between each nude show and the next. Its owners have helped to create related cabaret and burlesque shows in other cities. Unrelated businesses have used the phrase "Crazy Horse" in their names.

=== United Kingdom ===
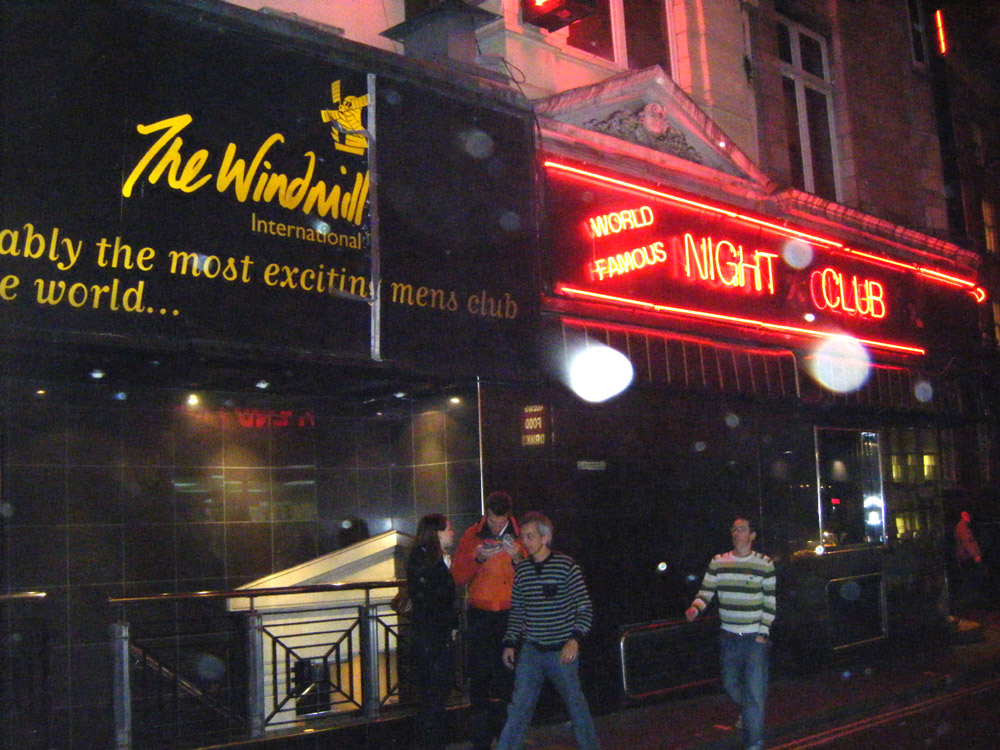
The Windmill Theatre in 2009

- The Box Soho is a cabaret nightclub located at 11-12 Walker's Court in Soho, London, on the premises formerly occupied by the Raymond Revuebar.
- The Raymond Revuebar (1958–2004) was a theatre and strip club at 11 Walker's Court (now the location of The Box Soho nightclub), in the centre of London's Soho district. For many years, it was the only venue in London that offered full-frontal, on-stage nudity of the sort commonly seen in other cities in Europe and North America. Its huge brightly lit sign declaring it to be the "World Centre of Erotic Entertainment" made the Revuebar a local landmark.
- The Windmill Theatre in Great Windmill Street, London, was a variety and revue theatre best known for its nude tableaux vivants, which began in 1932 and lasted until its reversion to a cinema in 1964. Many prominent British comedians of the post-war years started their careers at the theatre.

=== Switzerland ===
- The Red Lips is a strip club and cabaret nightclub located at Hohlstrasse 47, 8004 Zurich, near the red light district of Zurich, Langstrasse. The club has gained notoriety due to the scandal involving Pierin Vincenz, the former CEO of Raiffeisen (Switzerland), the second-largest banking group in Switzerland. The club has also been linked to Renata Angehrn, who worked there, the ex-wife of the renowned Swiss boxer Stefan Angehrn. In addition Hans-Peter Brunner, also known as the King of Zurich's underworld, owned the club.

=== United States ===
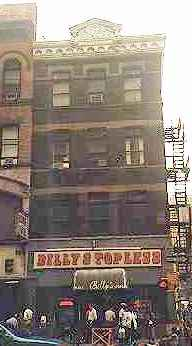
Billy's Topless after removal of the apostrophe on its sign, making it "Billy Stopless". This was done in 1998 to avoid being closed down by the first wave of new zoning laws in New York City.

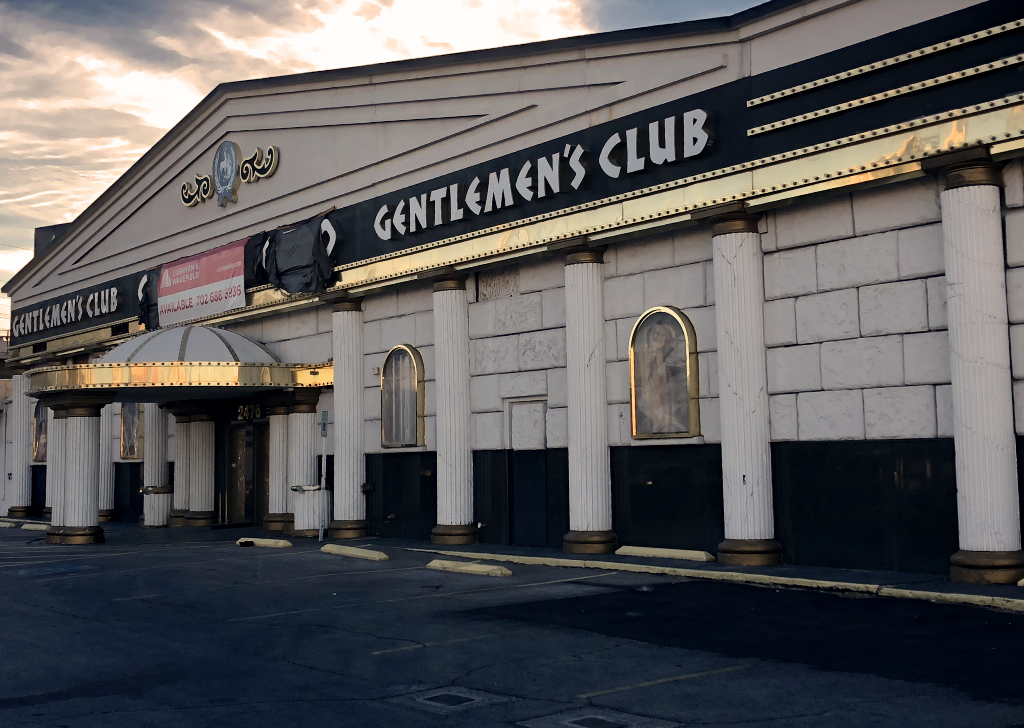
The closed Crazy Horse Too in 2018

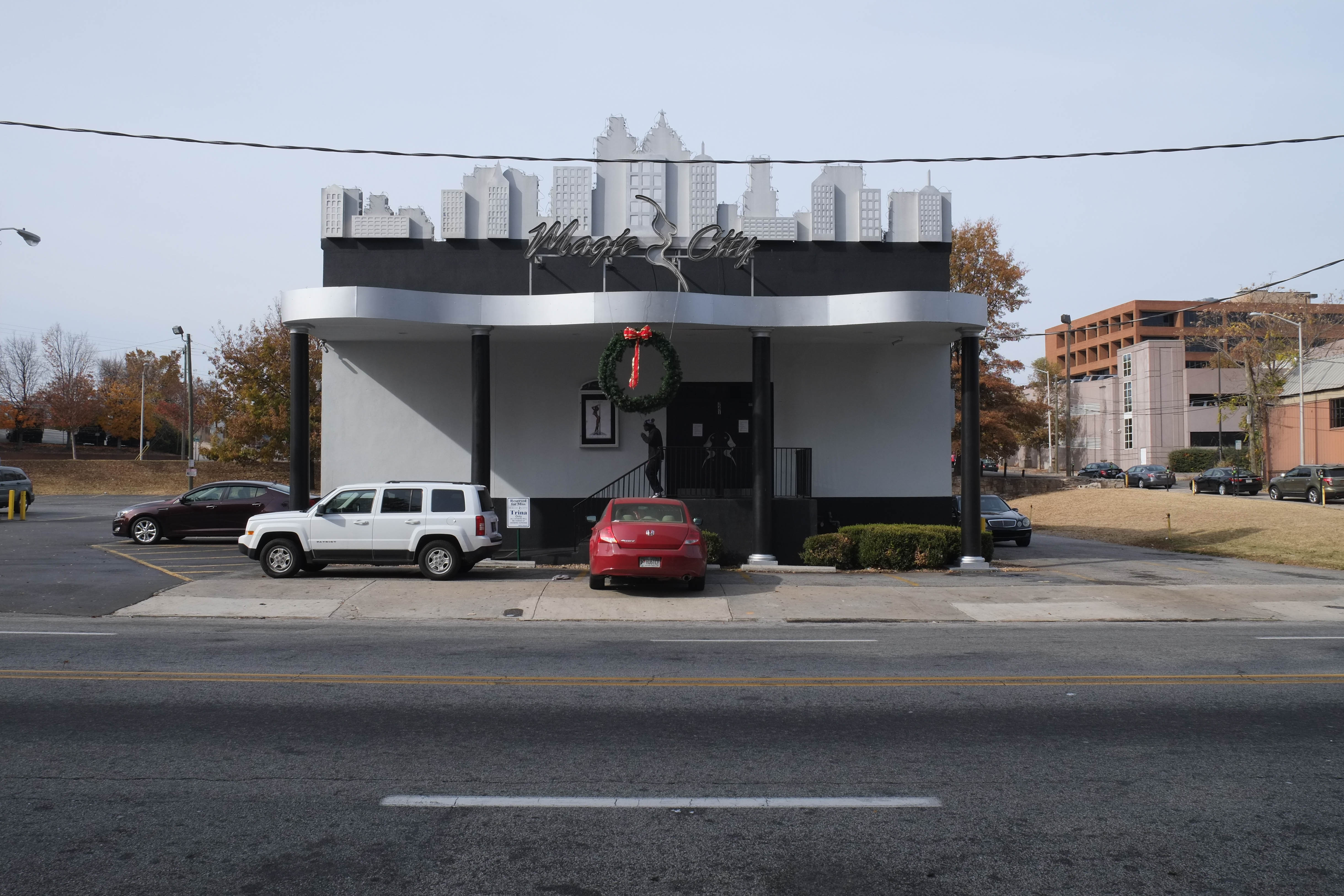
Magic City in 2018

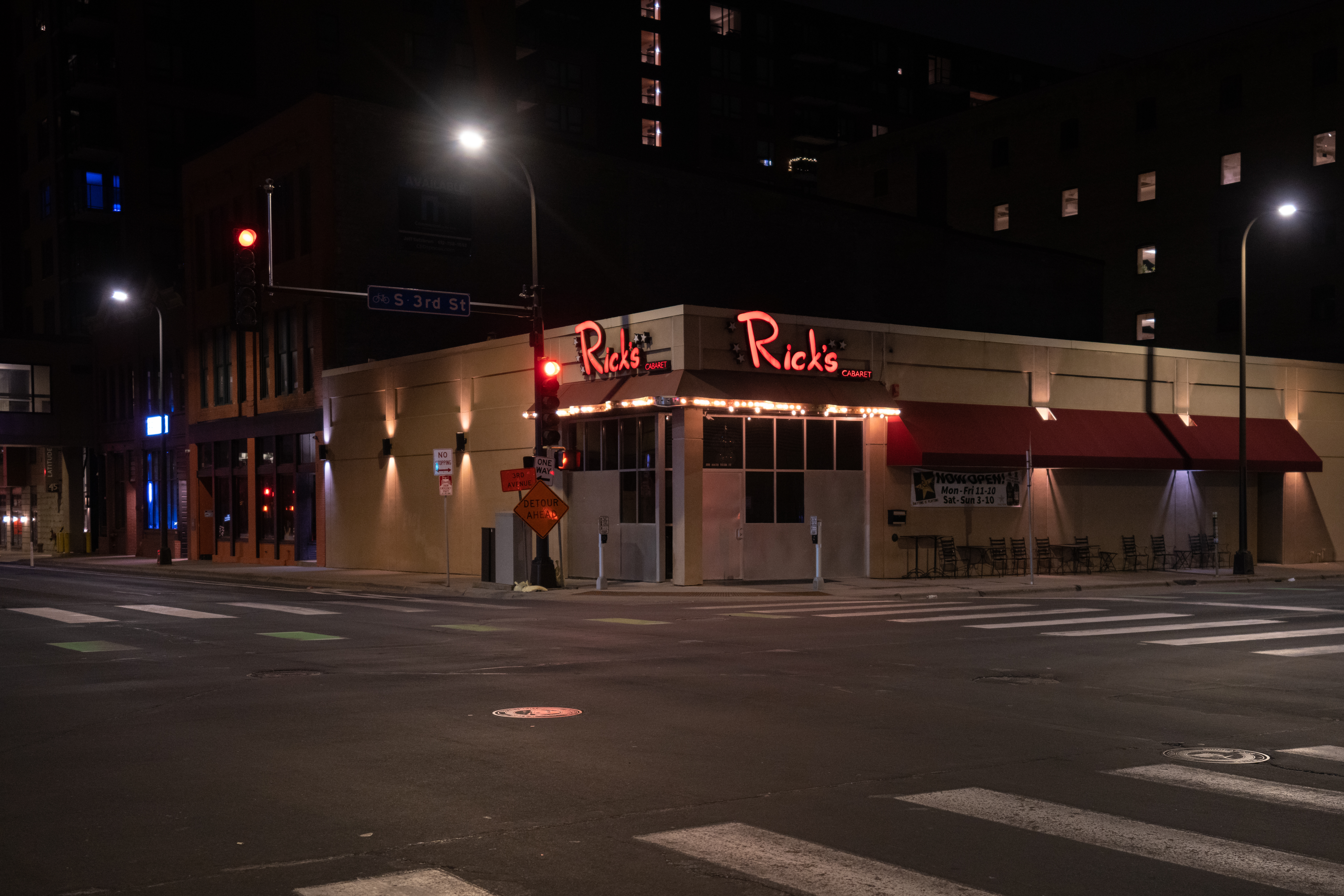
Rick's Cabaret in Minneapolis, Minnesota in 2021. It is owned by RCI Hospitality Holdings.

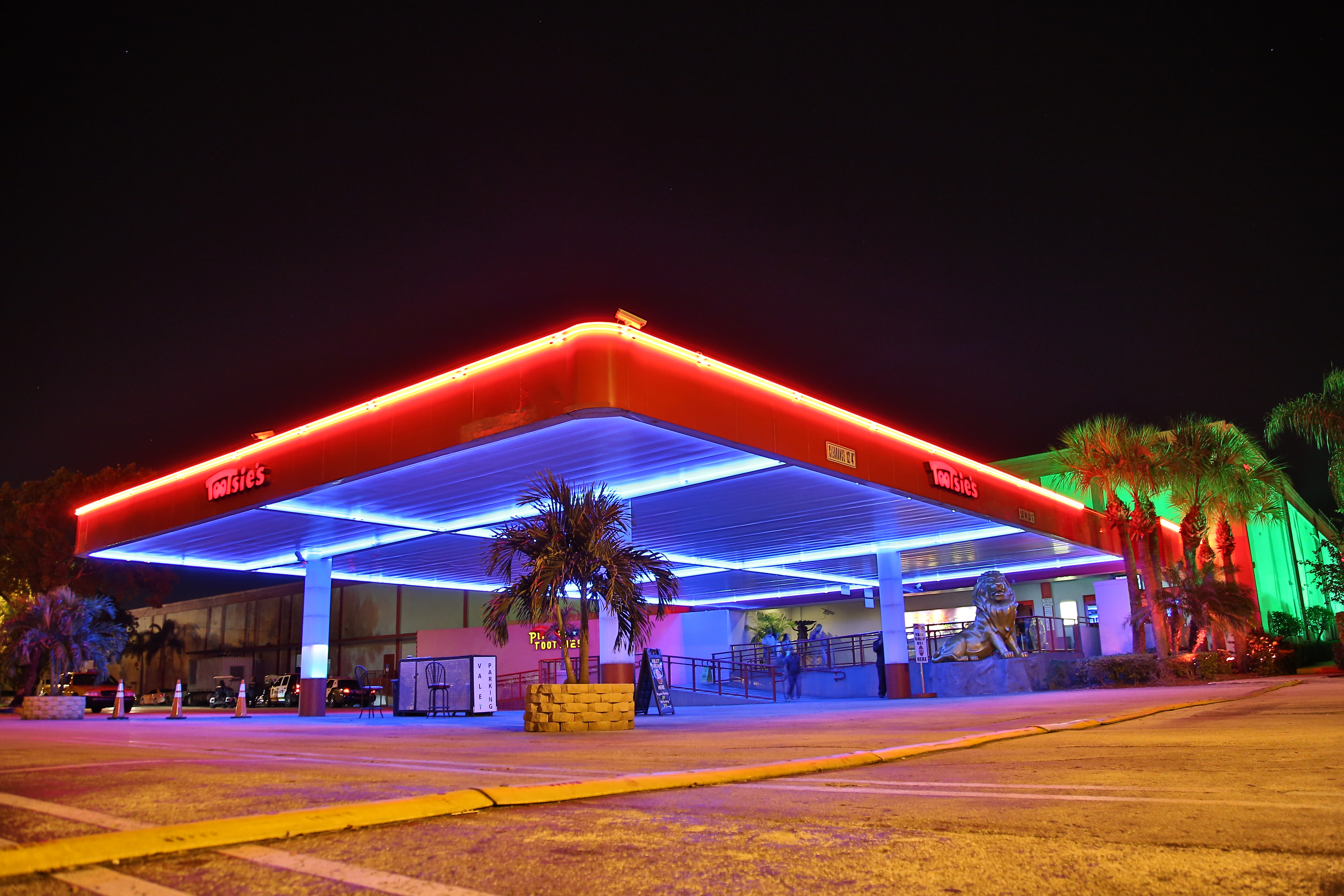
The entrance to Tootsie's Cabaret in 2015

- The Admiral Theatre in Chicago, Illinois, is a historic, landmark theater located on Lawrence Avenue, in the Albany Park area of Chicago, Illinois, presently operating as a strip club.
- Billy's Topless was a topless bar in the Chelsea neighborhood of New York City. Operating from 1970 to 2001, it was considered for many years an informal city landmark.
- Cheetah's Gentleman's Club is a strip club with locations in San Diego and Las Vegas, best known for being featured in the 1995 movie Showgirls, and also for having been owned by Mike Galardi, a nightclub owner who was investigated by the FBI with a controversial invocation of the Patriot Act. The Cheetah's club in San Diego is a full nude club where no alcohol is served. It has achieved notoriety for having been frequented by some of the September 11 hijackers.
- The Clermont Lounge is Atlanta's first and longest continually operating strip club, opened in 1965, and boasts a completely female ownership. Located in the basement of the Clermont Motor Hotel at 789 Ponce De Leon Avenue, in the Poncey–Highland neighborhood, the dive bar has survived multiple attempts at being closed by the Atlanta city government, and has established a nationwide reputation for its kitschy atmosphere and unusual dancers.
- The Condor Club nightclub is a striptease bar or topless bar in the North Beach section of San Francisco, California The club became famous in 1964 as the first fully topless nightclub in America, featuring the dancer Carol Doda wearing a monokini.
- Crazy Horse Too was a strip club located at 2476 Industrial Road in Las Vegas, Nevada, a few blocks west of the Las Vegas Strip. The club was known as Billy Jo's during the 1970s. In 1978, the club was purchased by Mob member Tony Albanese and renamed Billy Jo's Crazy Horse Too, after the Crazy Horse Saloon, another Las Vegas strip club owned by Albanese. In 1984, Rick Rizzolo took over operations of the club when it was purchased by his father, Bart Rizzolo. Rick Rizzolo was a majority owner by 1986.
- The 1891 Farmers and Mechanics Savings Bank building in Minneapolis, Minnesota, United States, is a Beaux-Arts style building that formerly served as the headquarters of Farmers and Mechanics Savings Bank. The building is now home to The Downtown Cabaret, a strip club. Architecture critic Larry Millett writes, "If you step inside for a view of the, ahem, scenery, you'll discover a glass dome that once illuminated a 'ladies banking lobby' but is now the scene of activities not everyone would consider ladylike."
- The Gaiety Theatre was a gay male burlesque theater in Times Square, New York City, for almost 30 years until it closed on March 17, 2005. The name on the awning over the entrance was Gaiety Theatre, but it was also called the Gaiety Male Burlesque or the Gaiety Male Theatre in advertisements. It was located at 201 W 46th Street, New York, NY 10036, on the second floor of the building that also housed what was the last Howard Johnson's restaurant in New York City. The Gaiety opened in late 1975 and closed in 2005 and was owned by Denise Rozis, run by both her and her younger sister, Evridiki Rozis.
- The Gold Club was a strip club in Buckhead, a district of Atlanta, Georgia, that operated from 1987 until 2001, the same year the owner pleaded guilty to racketeering charges.
- The Hungry I (stylized as hungry i) was a nightclub in San Francisco, California, originally located in the North Beach neighborhood. It played a major role in the history of stand-up comedy in the United States. It was launched by Eric "Big Daddy" Nord, who sold it to Enrico Banducci in 1951. The club moved to Ghirardelli Square in 1967 and operated mostly as a rock music venue until it closed in 1970.
- The Hustler Club is a series of bars and chain of go-go clubs licensed by Hustler magazine publisher Larry Flynt.
- Jumbo's Clown Room, often shorthanded to Jumbo's, is a "bikini bar" (non-nude strip club) located on Hollywood Boulevard in the East Hollywood neighborhood of Los Angeles, California. The bar opened on July 27, 1970. It became a strip club in 1982.
- The Lusty Lady is a pair of defunct peep show establishments, one in downtown Seattle and one in the North Beach district of San Francisco. The Lusty Lady was made famous by the labor activism of its San Francisco workers and the publication of several books about working there.
- Magic City is a prominent strip club in Atlanta, founded in 1985 and currently owned by Michael “Magic” Barney.
- Market Street Cinema was a historical theater located on Market Street in the Mid-Market district, San Francisco, California. It was founded in 1912 by David and Sid Grauman as the Imperial Theater. It was converted into a movie theatre as the Premiere Theatre (1929) and the United Artists Theatre (1931).
- The Mitchell Brothers O'Farrell Theatre was a strip club at 895 O'Farrell Street near San Francisco's Tenderloin neighborhood. Having opened as an X-rated movie theater by Jim and Artie Mitchell on July 4, 1969, the O'Farrell was one of America's most notorious adult-entertainment establishments. By 1980, the nightspot had popularized close-contact lap dancing, which would become the norm in strip clubs nationwide. Journalist Hunter S. Thompson, a longtime friend of the Mitchells and frequent visitor at the club, went there frequently during the summer of 1985 as part of his research for a possible book on pornography. Thompson called the O'Farrell "the Carnegie Hall of public sex in America" and Playboy magazine praised it as "the place to go in San Francisco!"
- The Palomino Club is a landmark North Las Vegas strip club. Since 2006 the club has been owned by Adam Gentile.
- RCI Hospitality Holdings, Inc. (previously Rick's Cabaret International, Inc.), through its subsidiaries, operates strip clubs, nightclubs, sports bars/restaurants, and a media and convention company that serves the adult club industry. RCI went public with an IPO in 1995 is listed on The NASDAQ Global Market under the symbol RICK.
- Sapphire Gentlemen's Club is a chain of strip clubs.
- Scores is a strip club in New York City. During its early years, it was known for its celebrity clientele, which included Howard Stern, Russell Crowe and Jason Giambi. At its peak, it operated in two locations in Manhattan and licensed its name to strip clubs in five other cities. The club has been beset by legal problems over the years, which have included ties to organized crime, tax evasion by its top executives, and club-sanctioned prostitution.
- Tootsie's Cabaret Miami is a large adult entertainment club in Miami Gardens, a suburb of Miami in northern Miami-Dade County, Florida. It is the largest strip club in the world at 76,000 square feet.
- Ziegfeld's/Secrets was a dual-themed nightclub in Washington, D.C., with Ziegfeld's featuring drag queens, and Secrets featuring male strippers. The entertainment venue first opened in 1980, was forced to close in 2006, then reopened in a new location in 2009. The second location was closed permanently in 2020.

==== Oregon ====
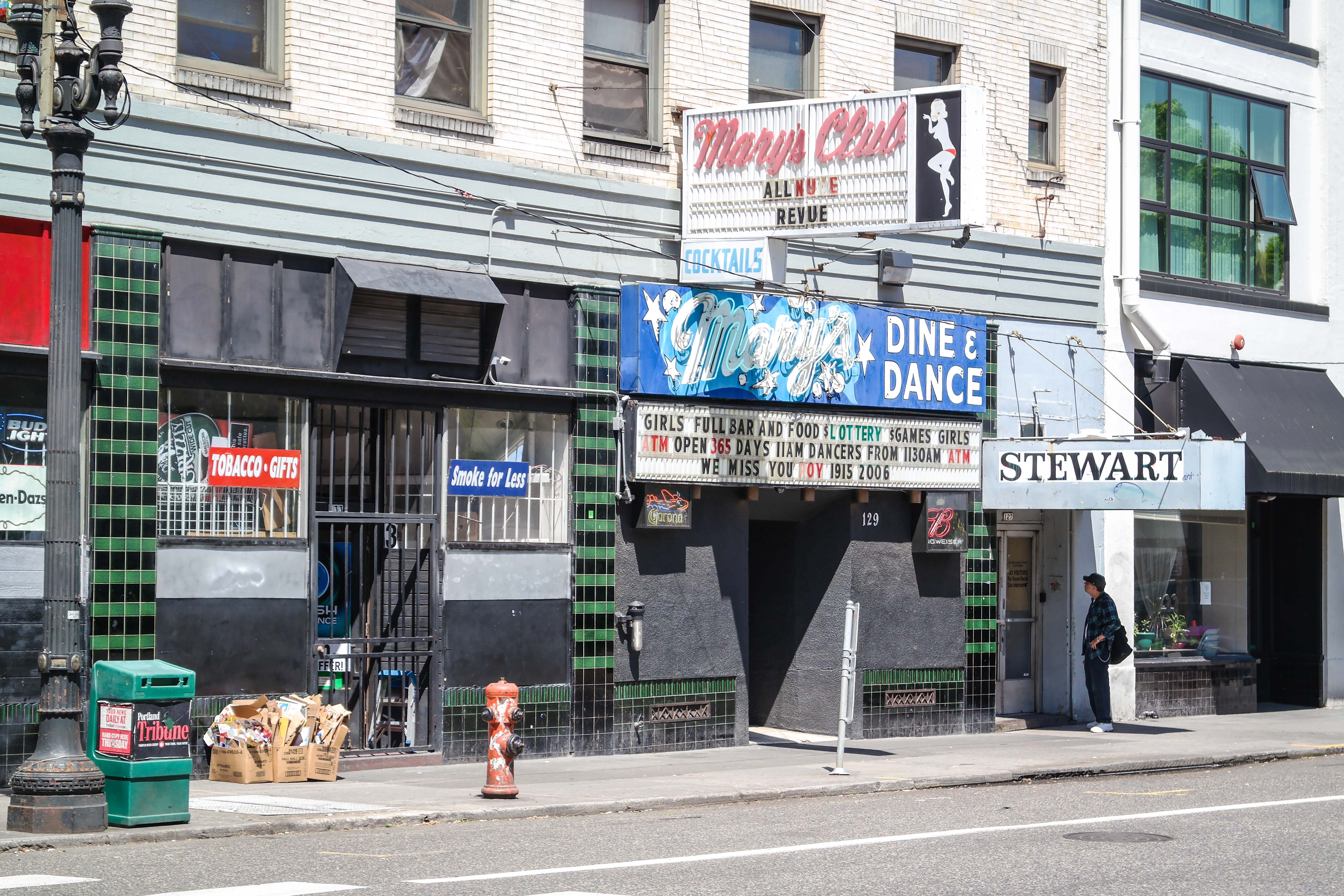
The entrance to Mary's Club in 2014

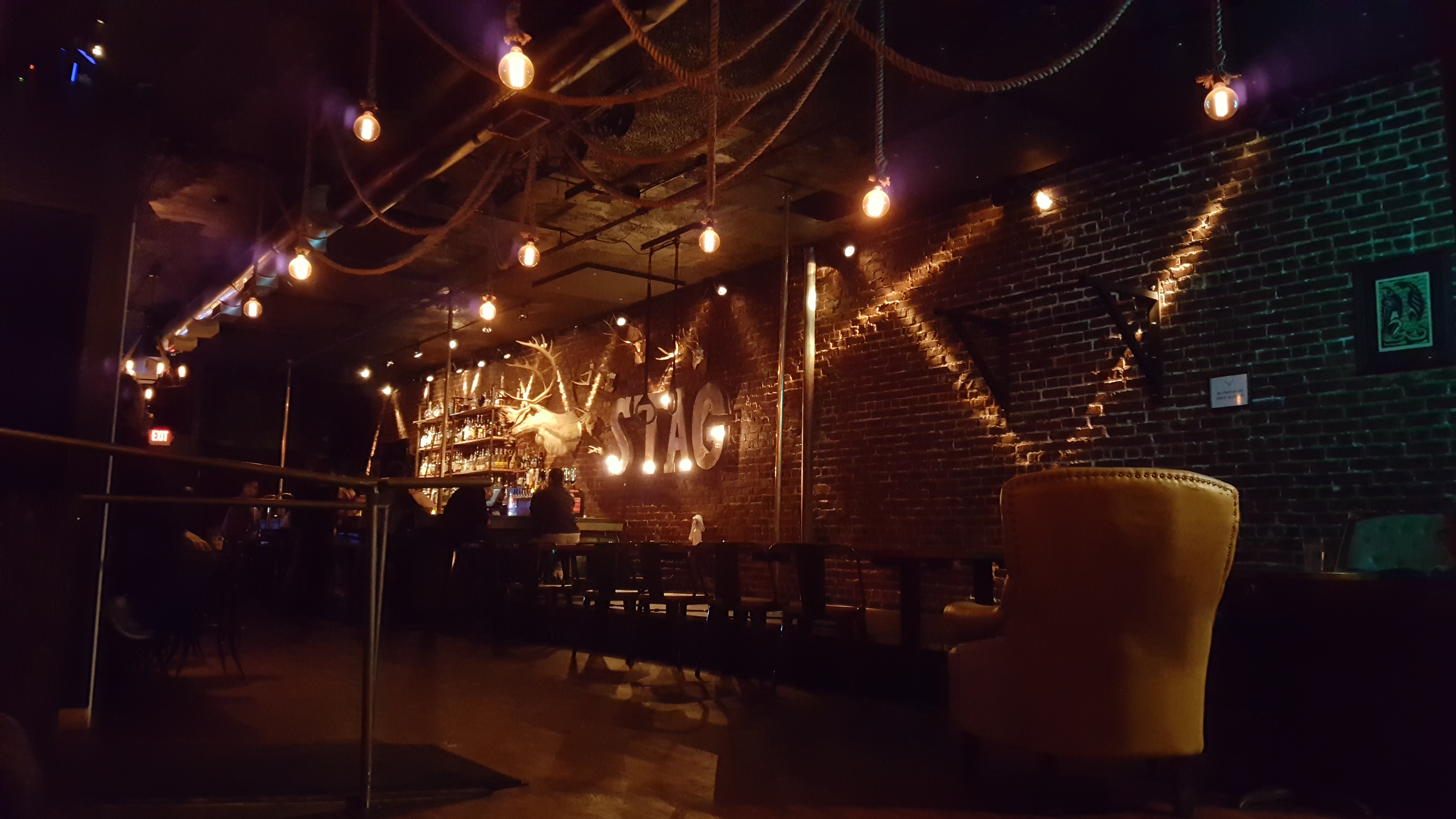
Interior view of Stag PDX in 2016

- Acropolis Steakhouse
- The Carriage Room was a strip club in Portland. The bar and restaurant closed in 1988.
- Devils Point, Portland
- Jiggles, sometimes called Jiggles Strip Club, was a strip club in Tualatin, Oregon, in the United States. In March 2014, Jiggles received media attention when Jake Stoneking, a 19 year old diagnosed with medulloblastoma, included a visit to the club on his list of activities to complete before his death. The club shut down and the building in which it was housed was demolished later that year.
- Mary's Club is the oldest strip club in Portland, Oregon, and among the oldest in the United States. In 1954, Roy Keller bought the business from Mary Duerst Hemming, who owned and operated Mary's as a piano bar beginning in the 1930s. Keller initially hired go-go dancers as entertainment during the piano player's breaks, later hiring them full-time because of their popularity. Topless dancers wearing pasties were introduced in 1955. The club also featured comics, musicians, singers and other acts. All-nude dancing began in 1985, after a judicial ruling against City of Portland ordinances banning it in venues which served alcohol.
- Silverado, formerly known as Flossie's, is a gay bar and strip club in Portland, Oregon's Old Town Chinatown neighborhood, in the United States.
- Stag PDX, or simply Stag, is a gay-owned nightclub and strip club in Portland, Oregon's Pearl District, in the United States. The club opened in May 2015 as the second all-nude gay strip club on the West Coast.
- Three Sisters Tavern, sometimes abridged as Three Sisters and nicknamed "Six Tits", was a gay bar and strip club in Portland, Oregon, United States. The bar was founded in 1964 and began catering to Portland's gay community in 1997 following the deaths of the original owners. The business evolved into a strip club featuring an all-male revue. Also frequented by women, sometimes for bachelorette parties, Three Sisters was considered a hub of Portland's nightlife before closing in 2004.

== See also ==
- List of strippers
- Bada Bing! – a fictional strip club from the HBO drama television series The Sopranos
- Sex industry
