= Stag PDX =

Club in Portland, Oregon, U.S.

- Logo

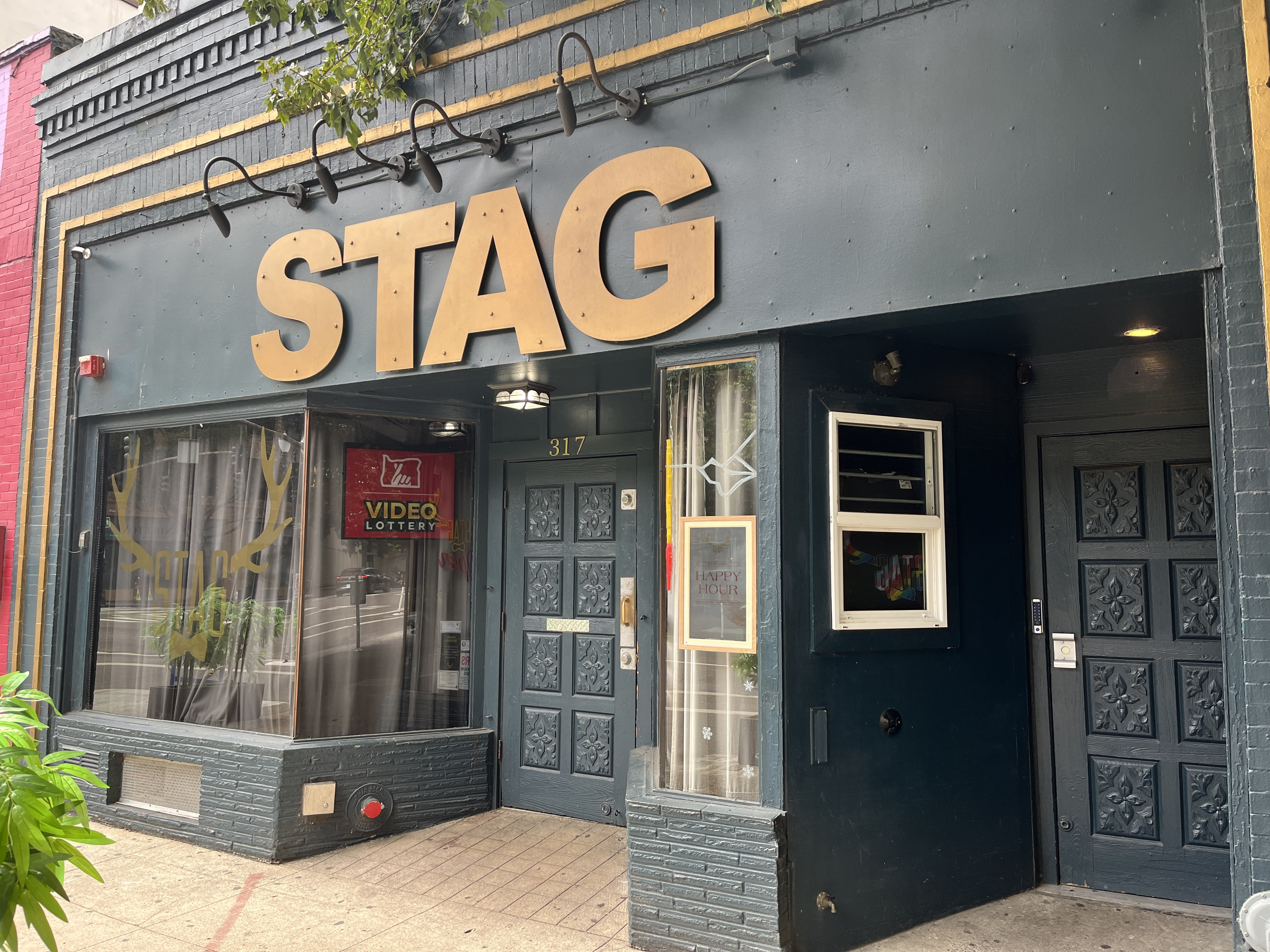
- The club's exterior in 2025

- Location in Portland, Oregon
- Address: 317 Northwest Broadway
- Location: Portland, Oregon, U.S.
- Coordinates: 45.52550°N 122.67786°W
- Owner: Julian de Looze
- Type: Gay bar; strip club

Construction
- Opened: May 1, 2015

Website
- stagportland.com

Stag PDX, or simply Stag, is a gay-owned nightclub and strip club in Portland, Oregon's Pearl District, in the United States. The club opened in May 2015 as the second all-nude gay strip club on the West Coast.

== Description ==
The gay-owned bar at 317 Broadway in northwest Portland's Pearl District has been described as "more gentlemen's club than night club" and "Northwest lounge-meets-library-meets-executive locker room". Willamette Week said the original Christopher David-designed club looked "like the private rooms where today's grandpas once held stag parties, with brown leather couches, Victorian wallpapered sitting rooms, Edison bulbs hanging from nautical rope, and dark, aqua walls covered in snowshoes and ancient oars and framed kitsch—plus a taxidermal white buck behind the bar." Vendors used to design the interior were "part of the community", according to the original owner Jerrick Hope-Lang, who said, "They wanted to have a very masculine, Pacific Northwest feel — a gentleman's club-meets-hunting lodge-meets-hot boys dancing in thongs."

Stag is the second all-nude gay strip club on the West Coast, after Silverado, which is located in downtown Portland. Unlike Silverado, which has a policy against bachelorette parties since 2012, Stag welcomes heterosexual patrons and bachelorette parties without "gaudy" accessories, in order to avoid distracting dancers and guests. Stag has hosted drag performances, including weekly drag-hosted brunches called "Testify".

== History ==
Hope-Lang and his business partner opened the club on May 1, 2015, in a building completed in 1912. He said of the club's origins: "I love the idea of other gay male clubs, but I didn't like the atmosphere. I wanted to create a space where I would like to hang out, a true gentleman's club. I talked with a couple of dancers from another establishment and the idea came about very organically." In 2017, Kim Chi hosted the second annual, three-day beach party as part of the club's pride celebrations.

In his 2019 "overview of Portland's LGBTQ+ nightlife for the newcomer", Andrew Jankowski of the Portland Mercury wrote: "It could be due to the management change, but lately Stag has been celebrating bodies that stray away from the classic Magic Mike image. Drag queen MCs host different music themed nights—like trap, Latin, and pop—as well as a weekly amateur night and a drag brunch. Two nights a month, their stage exclusively features trans dancers of all expressions."

In March 2023, Ali Quraishi, a dance manager at the club was arrested on multiple charges including the sexual assault of six women while working at the club. Quraishi was found guilty on 23 counts and sentenced to 145 years in prison in February 2025.

== Reception ==
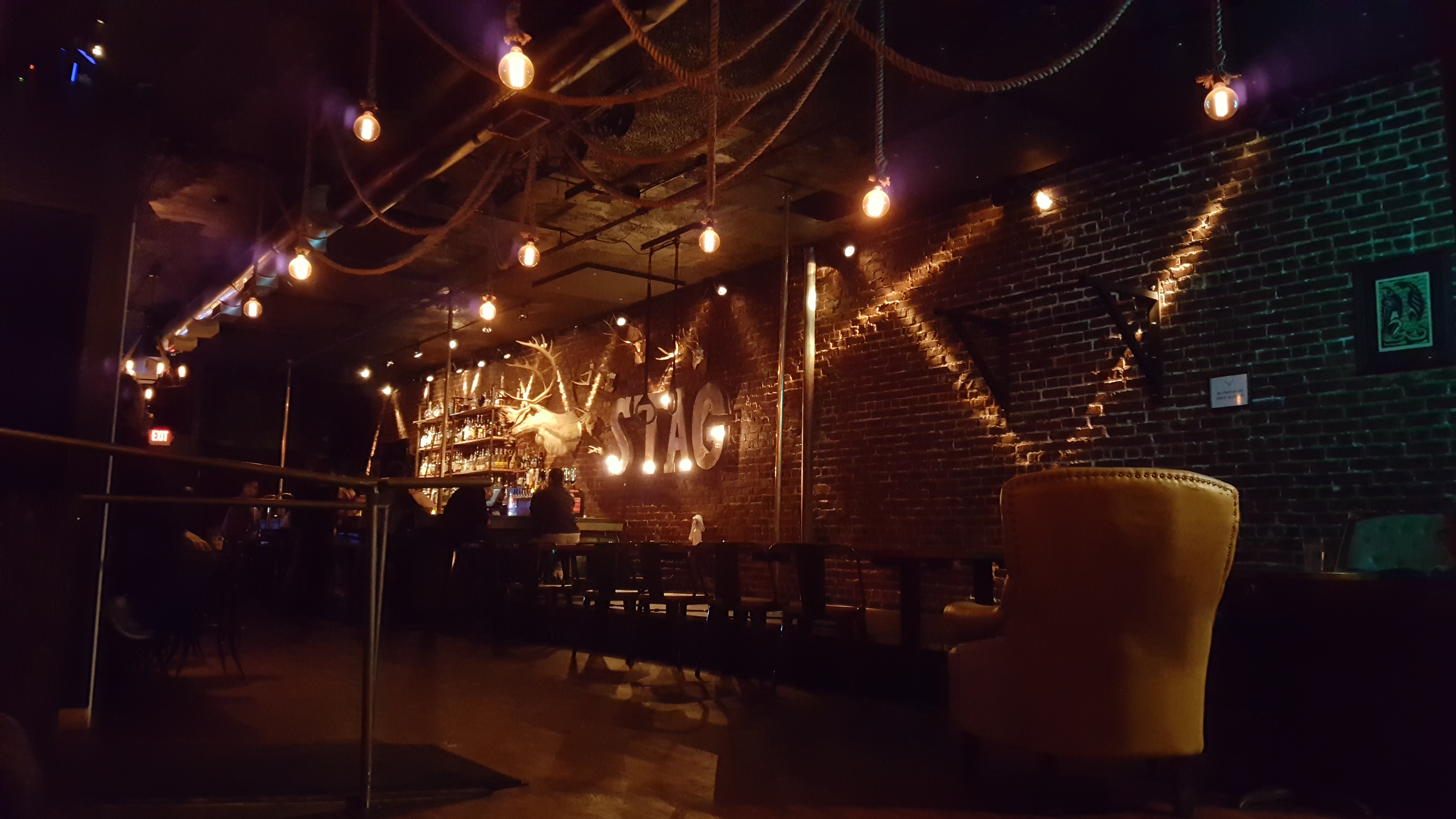
The bar's interior, 2016

In her review for Willamette Week, Lizzy Acker complimented the cocktails and said, "everything about Stag is a happy surprise". Furthermore, she wrote about her experience, "while the patrons are 90 percent male, not a single one side-eyed me, a woman, as I sat alone at the bar. By the time I left, someone had bought me a no-strings-attached drink and I had at least two new best friends. All in all, Stag might be my new favorite place in Portland."

In 2015, The Huffington Post contributor Eddie Parsons wrote an article called "Portland in the Gay '90s vs PDX NOW". He said of his experience, in part, "I dropped into Stag and found the old Portland strippers have been replaced by Cirque de Soleil like acrobats but the vibe is good. The bar quickly filled up with people from all over the world without attitudes..." One of Stag's bartenders was a runner-up in the "Best Bartender" category of Willamette Week's "Best of Portland Readers' Poll 2020".

== See also ==
- Culture of Portland, Oregon
- List of LGBTQ bars
- List of strip clubs
