= Terry Koumoudouros =

Canadian strip club owner

- Born: Greece
- Died: June 1, 2007; Canada
- Occupation: Strip club owner-operator
- Years active: 1969-2007
- Organization: House of Lancaster (strip clubs)

Terry Koumoudouros (died 2007) was a Greek-Canadian strip club owner who paved the way to legalise naked dancing in Toronto. With his brother, he was the co-owner of two House of Lancaster strip clubs.

== Early life ==
As a child, Koumoudouros worked as a shepherd in Greece, and read about philosophy before emigrating to Canada in 1964 with his younger brother, Spiro.

== Career ==
The same year that the Koumoudouros brothers moved to Canada, they opened the Queen Steak and Burger restaurant at the intersection of Kipling Avenue and Dundas Street. Later they sold food in the basement of a University Avenue office block.

In 1986, Koumoudouros won a legal challenge in the Supreme Court of Canada to allow naked dancing in strip clubs. He had previously avoided the intention of existing legislation that forbade naked dancing by employing dancers who initially danced topless before putting on a shirt and then dancing bottomless.

Koumoudouros and his brother ran a strip club in Toronto from 1969 or 1970 until 1980, at which point he returned to Greece. In 1982, he returned to Toronto and opened a strip club on The Queensway, opening another on Bloor Street in 1983.

== Politics ==
Koumoudouros was a donor to the Liberal Party of Canada and a worked with Toronto's municipal government to improve the Bloordale neighbourhood. His meeting with federal immigration minister Judy Sgro's chief of staff came to light during the Strippergate (Canada) scandal in 2004, when he advocated for federal help for Dominican strippers trying to move to Canada.

== Personal life and death ==
Koumoudouros was married with three children and two stepchildren. He died on May 24, 2007.
