= Jumbo's Clown Room =

Bikini bar in Los Angeles, California

- Jumbo's
- Interactive map of Jumbo's Clown Room
- Location: 5153 Hollywood Boulevard, Los Angeles, California 90027-6113
- Coordinates: 34.10207°N 118.30235°W
- Seating type: counter, table, stage
- Type: Bikini bar

Construction
- Opened: June 23, 1970
- Renovated: 1980 (renovated and converted into a strip club)

Website
- jumbos.com

Jumbo's Clown Room, often shorthanded to Jumbo's, is a "bikini bar" (non-nude strip club) located on Hollywood Boulevard in the East Hollywood neighborhood of Los Angeles, California. The bar opened on July 27, 1970. It became a strip club in 1982.

== Overview ==
Jumbo's Clown Room is a bikini bar gentlemen's club located in Hollywood/ Thai town. It has also been described as being "infamous" and as somewhat of a dive bar with unusual clown images hung on the walls that provides some inexpensive beer options while also hosting exotic dancers that perform striptease and pole dancing. Some of the workers there also perform lap dances. Rather than having an on-premises disk jockey, the dancers choose their own songs using a jukebox. Jumbo's serves beer and cocktails. It has always been a family-owned and operated business. Jumbos Clown Room is not associated with any online shows.

== In popular culture ==
Musician and actress Courtney Love once worked as a dancer at Jumbo's Clown Room. Musician Lemmy of Motörhead sometimes patronized the establishment. Anthony Bourdain had described himself as a "fan" of the club and had stated that it was one of his favorite bars. In 2017, Ellen DeGeneres performed a skit at Jumbo's for The Ellen DeGeneres Show as "Karla Kardashian", a fictional character that has been described as "a lesser-known fourth Kardashian sister". The heavy metal band Rusty Eye filmed two music videos at Jumbo's in 2020. Circa 2020, country musician Jaime Wyatt filmed the video for the song "Neon Cross" at Jumbo's. In the 1985 film Walking the Edge, Robert Forster's character is a regular at the Clown Room. On the late-night show Conan, Johnny Five tells Aziz Ansari, "I'll meet you at Jumbo's Clown Room", and host Conan O'Brien adds, "That's a great joke if you know what Jumbo's Clown Room is."

== See also ==
- List of strip clubs
