= Billy's Topless =

Topless bar in New York City, United States

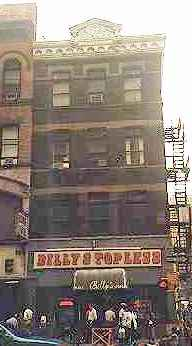
- Billy's Topless after removal of apostrophe, making it "Billy Stopless".
- Interactive map of Billy's Topless
- Address: 727 Sixth Avenue and 24th Street
- Location: Chelsea, Manhattan
- Coordinates: 40°44′37″N 73°59′33.5″W
- Type: Topless bar

Construction
- Opened: 1970; 56 years ago
- Closed: 2001; 25 years ago

Billy's Topless was a topless bar in the Chelsea neighborhood of New York City. Operating from 1970 to 2001, it was considered for many years an informal city landmark.

== The bar ==
Billy's Topless was first located at 22nd street and Sixth Ave. and moved in 1970 to 727 Sixth Avenue (Avenue of the Americas) and 24th Street in Manhattan's Chelsea neighborhood in New York City, was a small topless bar, more closely resembling a neighborhood bar than a strip club in both size and atmosphere; one writer described it as "no more illicit than if we had decided to go get hamburgers". Considered an informal landmark of the area, Billy's contained only a small bar and a stage surrounded by about 24 chairs. The bar offered a modest free buffet, perhaps a single dish such as lasagna over a can of Sterno. Also, unusual for such an establishment, Billy's had no cover charge.

The original owner of Billy's Topless was Bill Pell. After Pell died in the late 1970s, Billy's was acquired by Milton Anthony, the owner of the AP Variety Talent Agency, formerly the Mambo Hyde Talent Agency, an agency that had provided "topless go-go dancers" to numerous strip clubs in New York City since 1966.

An older anachronism in the New York adult entertainment scene, Anthony (born c. 1920) claimed he held to certain principles with his agency and in his club: no breast implants, no lap dancing, and no touching the dancers. As such, Billy's stood in contrast to expensive adult clubs such as Scores that tended toward dancers with a more stereotypically "Barbie doll" look and allowed direct contact with the patrons. Detractors of Billy's occasionally lower-end charm called it "seedy". Supporters tended to think of it as "old fashioned", and the kind of establishment that catered to "real people". The Village Voice writer Robert Sietsema called it an "old fashioned topless bar ... where the old grit still remains."

== Closing ==
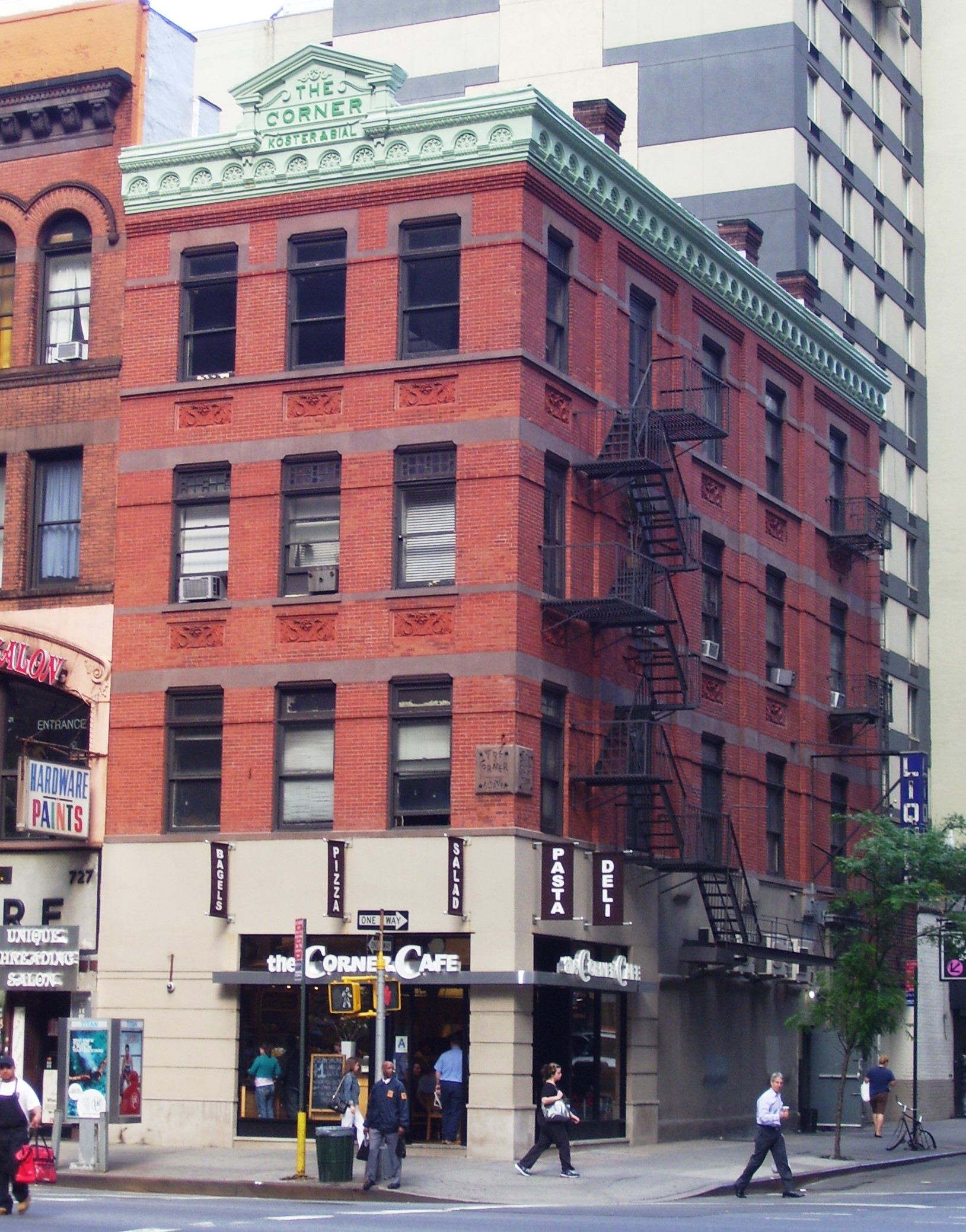
The building in 2013

Billy's Topless suffered, along with much of the city's adult entertainment industry, under the quality of life directives of then-mayor Rudy Giuliani, who called New York's adult establishments a threat to public "health, safety and welfare" and a "corrosive institution". In his second term he aggressively targeted New York's sex industry for "reconstruction". Laws were enacted forbidding adult establishments from operating within 500 feet of a residence, school or place of worship, and the NYPD conducted raids on businesses that did not comply with the new ordinance.

The laws were initially drafted to target the sex businesses in the Times Square area, but small, local establishments like Billy's were affected as well. The Chelsea community board (Manhattan Community Board 4) confirmed that there had never been a citizen complaint against either Billy's Topless or its customers.

In 1998, to avoid being closed down by the first wave of new zoning laws, Billy's took "topless" out of the bar's name, and the place was rechristened "Billy Stopless" by removing the apostrophe from the sign (see image at right), although it was referred to in print as "Billy's Stopless" and dancers had to wear bikini tops. In the mid-1990s, dancers at Billy's made $50 plus tips, which typically amounted to about $500 per night. After the change in policy to avoid the zoning laws, the bikini-clad dancers could expect to take home about $200. Patrons were quoted as saying, "You can see this on the beach for free. This is no fun." Billy's Topless closed for good in 2001, and the space was converted into a bagel shop.

In 1998, Billy's appeared in the movie Rounders with Matt Damon, John Malkovich and Edward Norton. Many celebrities and rock stars stopped in as a place to visit while in Manhattan.

In 2006, an establishment bearing the name "Billy's Topless" appeared at 10th Avenue and 15th Street. It is unknown if there is any connection to the original "Billy's" beyond the name.

== People ==
- Swiss dancer Monica Beerle, student at the Martha Graham Center of Contemporary Dance, roommate and victim of cannibal-murderer Daniel Rakowitz, danced at Billy's. Rakowitz was at one time suspected of having killed as many as eight former dancers from Billy's.
- American novelist Alan Kaufman was once a regular at Billy's.
- Show business photographer and pioneer of male nude photography Ron Blakey had his studio above the bar.

== See also ==
- List of strip clubs

== Literature ==
- New York Vampire: PUNK by K.D. McQuain, Black Marque Press, 2016, ISBN 0692537988
