= Devils Point (bar) =

Bar and strip club in Portland, Oregon, U.S.

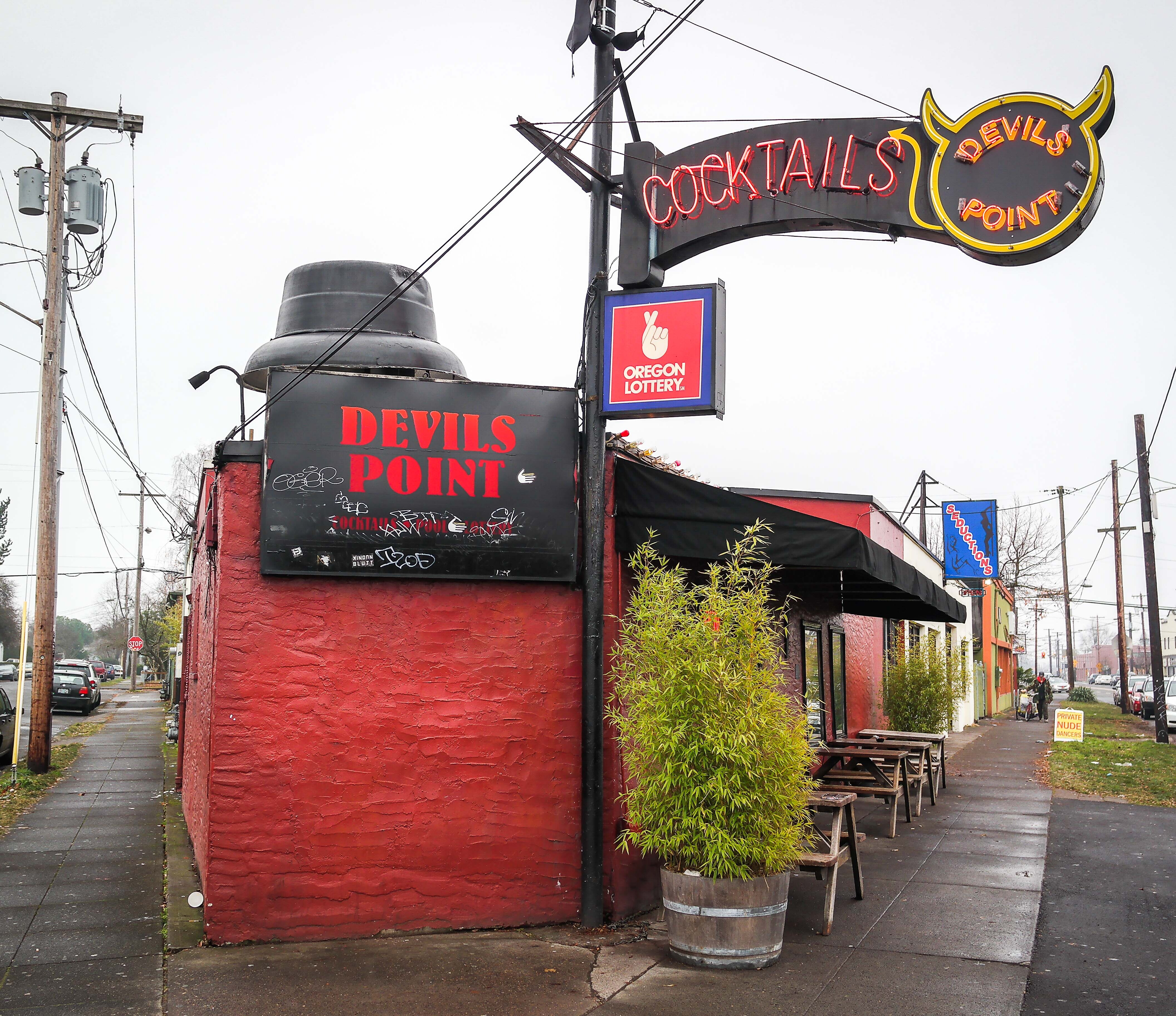
- The bar's exterior, 2013
- Interactive map of Devils Point

Restaurant information
- Location: 5305 Southeast Foster Road, Portland, Multnomah, Oregon, 97206, United States
- Coordinates: 45.4954°N 122.6080°W
- Website: devilspointbar.com

Devils Point (also known as Devil's Point Strip Club) is a bar and strip club in Portland, Oregon.

== Description ==
Devils Point is a small bar and strip club in Southeast Portland's Foster-Powell neighborhood. According to Willamette Week, "Dancers are as likely to take the lone stage in beat-up Vans as platform heels, the soundtrack ranges from Pantera to the Sugarcubes, and the bar area is decorated like it's permanently Halloween." The bar hosts "Stripparoke" or "Stripperoke" (karaoke and stripping).

== History ==
Shon Boulden is a co-owner. Eagles of Death Metal performed at the venue in 2017.

== Reception ==
Thrillist included Devils Point in a 2015 "definitive guide" to the city's seventeen best strip venues. Alexander Frane of Condé Nast Traveler said, "This tiny bar, known for its rock 'n' roll and fun party vibe, is one of Portland's best strip clubs." He included Devils Point in the magazine's 2018 list of Portland's thirteen best bars.

== See also ==
- List of strip clubs
