= Tootsie's Cabaret =

Strip club in Miami, Florida

Coordinates: 25.9414643°N 80.2034306°W

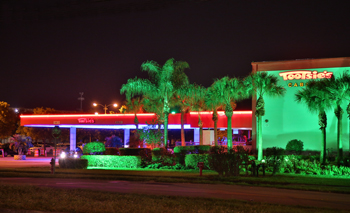
Tootsie's Cabaret Gentlemen's Club Miami

Tootsie's Cabaret Miami is a large adult entertainment club in Miami Gardens, a suburb of Miami in northern Miami-Dade County, Florida. It is the largest strip club in the world at 76,000 square feet.

== History ==
Tootsie's Cabaret opened in 1993 as a small club in Miami Gardens. In 2006, the club moved to a building that formerly housed a BJ's distribution center in Miami Gardens.

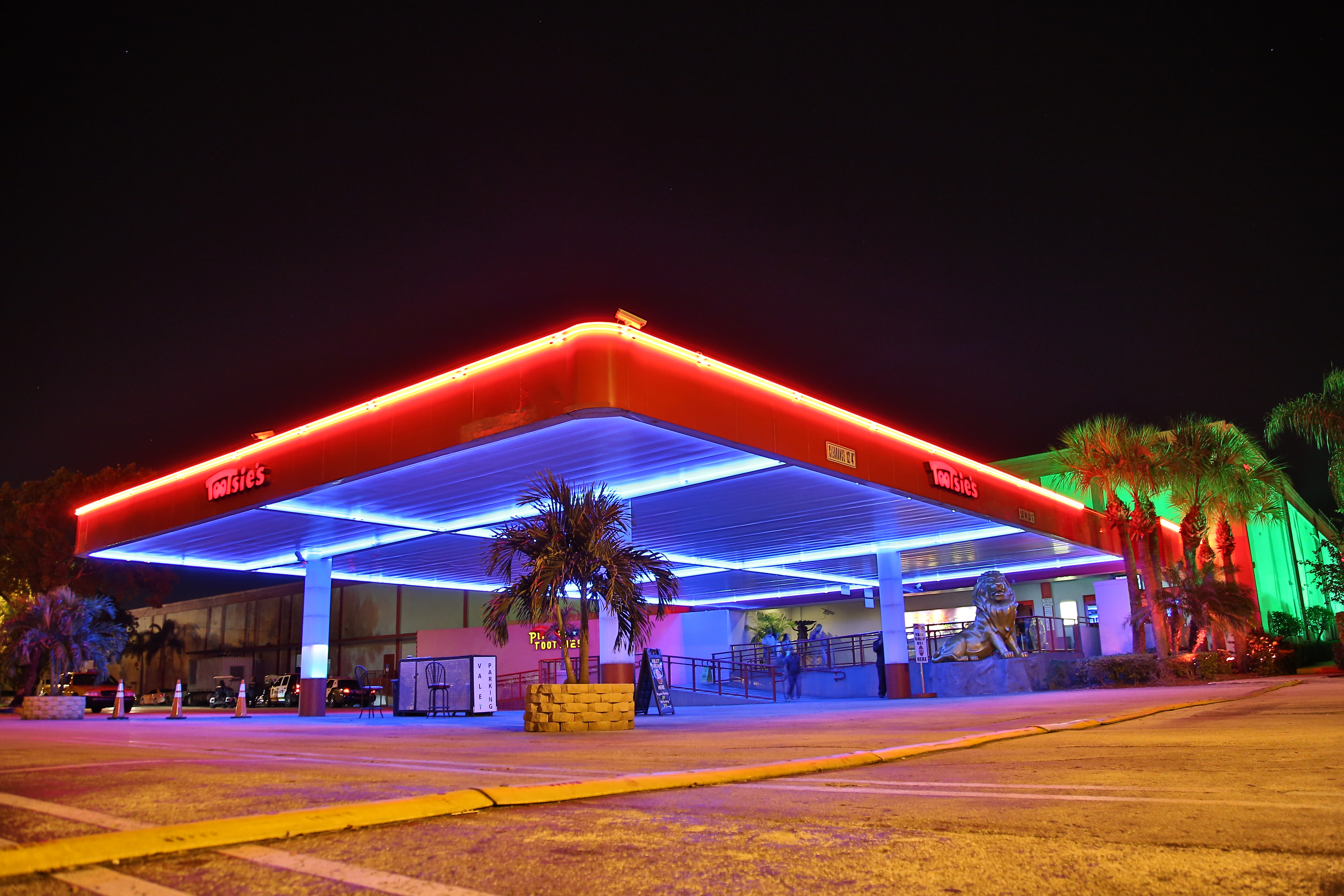
Tootsie's Cabaret Entrance

In 2007 a subsidiary of RCI Hospitality Holdings Inc. acquired Tootsie's Cabaret for $25 million. In 2015 the subsidiary purchased the building two, increasing the square footage.

Tootsie's is known for their lobster tail and lemon pepper wings.

On March 1, 2022, RCI announced Tootsie's was one of the first of RCI's subsidiaries to accept Bitcoin as payment.

In October 2020 Tootsie's Cabaret sued Miami-Dade County over the 12:00 midnight curfew it had imposed on bars and clubs as a means of limiting the spread of COVID-19.

== In popular culture ==
Music artist Drake, in the 2015 track "Back to Back", mentioned Tootsie's: "I mean whoa, can't fool the city, man, they know what's up, second floor at Tootsie's, getting shoulder rubs". Miami music artist Pitbull mentioned Tootsie's on his 2012 album Global Warming: "I'm off that, Scarlett's, Tootsie's, I love that." Time Out magazine listed Tootsie's Cabaret as a top strip club destination in Miami. Thrillist listed Tootsie's Cabaret as the best Strip Club to Watch a Game.

On December 2, 2021, contemporary artist Todd Gray, as part of Miami's famed Art Week, body-painted a dancer and previewed recent original pieces of artwork at Tootsie's.

== Awards ==
- Miami New Times – Best Strip Club 2006
- Miami New Times – Best Strip Club Miami 2015
- Miami New Times – Best Strip Club Miami 2019

== See also ==
- List of strip clubs
