= Daniel Rakowitz =

American killer and cannibal (born 1960)

- Born: December 24, 1960 (age 65); Fort Leonard Wood, Missouri
- Other names: Daniel Rakowitz; Butcher of Tompkins Square Park
- Known for: Killing of Monika Beerle

Daniel Paul Rakowitz (born December 24, 1960), also known as the Butcher of Tompkins Square Park, is an American killer and cannibal.

== Early life ==
Rakowitz was born in Fort Leonard Wood, Missouri, where his father was a criminal investigator for the U.S. Army. When he was 2 years old, his mother suffered a heart attack and died, and he stayed with her body for hours. The Rakowitz family moved to Rockport, Texas sometime in the late 1970s. Although it is commonly reported that Rakowitz graduated from Rockport-Fulton High School in 1980, he actually attended and graduated from high school in Refugio, Texas.

== Killing of Monika Beerle ==
Rakowitz moved to New York City around 1985. He had a long history of psychosis since childhood and heavily used cannabis and drugs in general. An eccentric well known to his East Village neighbors as a cannabis dealer and owner of a pet rooster, Rakowitz attempted to found his own religion — the Church of 966. He variously claimed to be Jesus Christ or God, the Antichrist, and the "God of marijuana". Rakowitz is also known to have been involved with a cannabis church in Manhattan called the Church of the Realized Fantasy and to have sold cannabis for them. In addition, he is known to have briefly visited the Temple of the True Inner Light, a psychedelic church in the East Village, and to have smoked the psychedelic drug dipropyltryptamine (DPT) there a few times, but the group found him disturbing and he was eventually told to stay away.

In 1989, Rakowitz walked around Tompkins Square Park in the East Village bragging to some of the people he believed were his disciples that he had killed the woman he believed to be his live-in girlfriend. Monika Beerle, actually a roommate of Rakowitz's, was a Swiss student at the Martha Graham Center of Contemporary Dance, and a dancer at Billy's Topless. Several of Rakowitz's friends disputed the notion that Monika was his girlfriend. By his own confession, he dismembered her body in the bathtub, boiled the parts, and served some of her remains in the form of a soup to the homeless in Tompkins Square Park. He said that he had boiled her head and made soup from her brain. He had tasted it, liked it, and thereafter referred to himself as a cannibal. At least one of the people to whom he had told his tale went to police. Rakowitz was arrested shortly thereafter, and led the police to the Port Authority Bus Terminal storage area, where he had stored her skull and teeth.

On February 22, 1991, a New York jury found Rakowitz not guilty by reason of insanity for the killing of Monika Beerle on August 19, 1989. Sunny Hostin later said that she had been the holdout juror who was principally responsible for preventing the jury from returning a guilty verdict. However, in several contemporaneous accounts, the principal holdout juror was described as an unemployed man who prolonged deliberations to keep collecting the $15 daily fee and free meals. One Newsday article reported there were two holdouts and cited Hostin, then identified as Asunción Cummings, as saying: "We had to compromise ... But it is obvious to me he butchered the body and he literally got away with murder."

In 2004, a jury found Rakowitz no longer dangerous but decided that he is still mentally ill and should remain at the Kirby Forensic Psychiatric Center on New York City's Wards Island. A judge however found that the jury had no authority to make such a determination and determined that Rakowitz does in fact have a dangerous mental disorder.

== See also ==
- List of incidents of cannibalism
- List of people claimed to be Jesus
