= Strippergate (Canada) =

Canadian political scandal 2004/5

- Part of 2004 Canadian federal election campaign
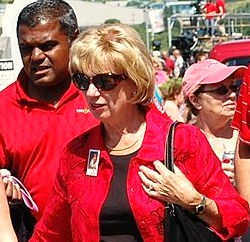
- Sgro in 2010
- Date: November 2004 - January 2005
- Location: Greater Toronto Area
- Accused: Judy Sgro
- Charges: Conflict of interest
- Verdict: No willfull wrongdoing

Strippergate was a 2004-2005 political scandal in Canada in which federal immigration minister Judy Sgro was accused of providing favours to people who helped with her political campaigning during the 2004 Canadian federal election. Sgro was accused of giving favourable immigration processing to Romanian immigrant, stripper, and campaign volunteer Alina Balaican, and Harjit Singh, a campaign donor and pizza shop owner.

Sgro was later partially cleared of wrongdoing by the federal ethics commissioner, although his report highlighted that her staff were aware of the immigration situation of Balaican.

== Background ==
Since 1998, Canada has issued work permits to immigrant-strippers, issuing 660 in 2001. Public awareness of the government's immigration program was low until the events of 2004 brought them into the media's spotlight.

== Strippergate ==
In November 2004, controversy began to surround immigration minister Judy Sgro as questions arose surrounding her activities during the 2004 Canadian federal election. Several members of her ministerial staff had filed expense claims to travel to and work in her riding throughout the campaign ending on election day. More serious claims were also raised when Opposition Conservative MPs claimed she had given a special immigration permit to Alina Balaican, a 25-year-old Romania exotic dancer who worked as a campaign volunteer. New Democratic Party member of parliament Pat Martin also accused Sgro's aides of making threats to deny ministerial permits to his constituents if he criticized her on the stripper controversy. The press dubbed the issue Strippergate.

In December 2004, Sgro defended the actions of her department, stating that they had spent years trying to end the program allowing strippers to gain work permits in Canada, but were prevented by Employment and Social Development Canada. Sgro was criticised further when it emerged that her acting chief of staff Ihor Wons had met with strip club owner and Liberal party donor Terry Koumoudouros and Peter Psihogios, owner of Airport Strip Club and Vice-President of the Adult Entertainment Association of Canada to discuss their struggles supporting eighteen strippers emigrate to Canada from the Dominican Republic.

On January 14, 2005, Sgro resigned from cabinet after further allegations that she had offered to intervene in the immigration hearing of Harjit Singh, a Brampton pizzeria owner, in exchange for free pizza for her campaign staff. Sgro stating that her motivations to resign were to focus on defending the accusations against her. The following day, the Toronto Star revealed that Singh had previously committed credit card fraud. On January 31, 2005, Sgro filed a lawsuit against Singh for $750,000 in damages. He counter-sued for $1.25 million but later withdrew his claim and apologized, prompting Sgro to also drop her litigation. Singh was deported to India on February 2, 2005. His allegations against that Sgro promised him asylum in return for free pizza were described as "wild and unsubstantiated" in Valerie Knowles 2007 book Strangers at Our Gates: Canadian Immigration and Immigration Policy, 1504-1990.

== Aftermath ==
On May 10, 2005, the Federal ethics commissioner Bernard Shapiro partially cleared Sgro of wrongdoing in his report entitled Many Shades of Grey, which concluded that Sgro did not know that two staffers had put her in a position of conflict of interest. Sgro was the first member of Cabinet to resign from Paul Martin's government.

By 2004, the number of visas issued to exotic dancers reduced to 423 per year and by 2006 100 were being renewed per annum. Women's rights advocates criticised the Conservative opposition for using the scandal to score points against the Liberal government, but for not using the situation to reduce the exploration risk for women. As of 2024, Sgro had not returned to cabinet but has chaired the Canadian House of Commons Standing Committee on International Trade since 2020. Harjit Singh returned to Canada in 2019.

== See also ==
- List of political scandals in Canada
- List of -gate scandals and controversies
- Immigration to Canada
- Strippergate (Seattle)
- Strippergate (Israel)
- Strippergate (San Diego)
