= Cheetah's =

Gentleman's club in San Diego & Las Vegas

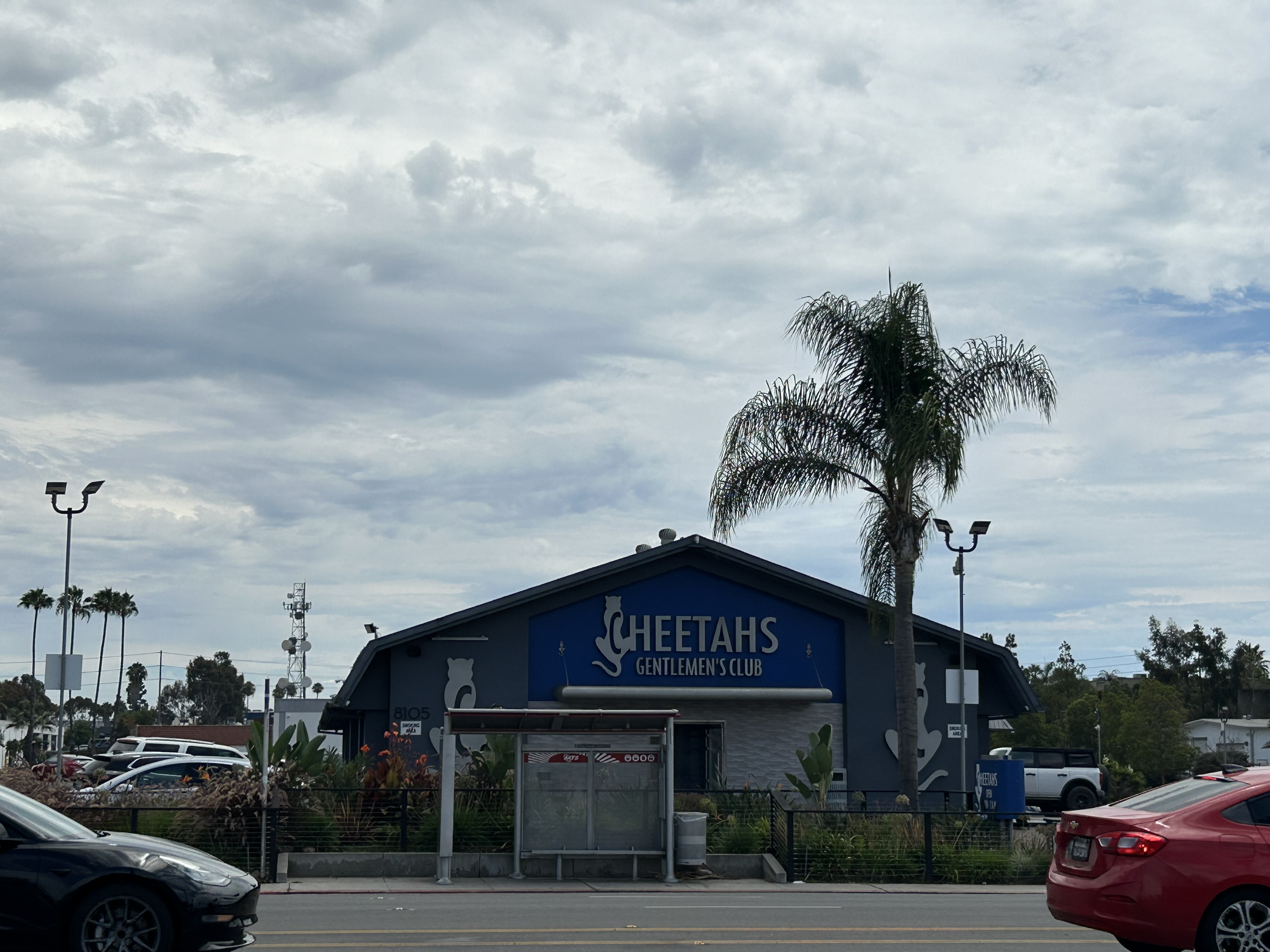
Cheetah's Strip Club in San Diego, California

Cheetah's Gentleman's Club is a strip club with locations in San Diego and Las Vegas, best known for being featured in the 1995 movie Showgirls, and also for having been owned by Mike Galardi, a nightclub owner who was investigated by the FBI with a controversial invocation of the Patriot Act. The Cheetah's club in San Diego is a full nude club where no alcohol is served. It has achieved notoriety for having been frequented by some of the September 11 hijackers.

== Las Vegas Club ==
The Las Vegas club was founded in 1991 by Michael Galardi, and employed about 150 dancers under the Cheetah's brand. In 2004, Galardi admitted in a San Diego federal trial that he bribed Las Vegas officials in an attempt to influence strip club regulations. In a Las Vegas federal court, he stated that he paid between $200,000 and $400,000.

The club was managed by Charles Wright, a retired professional wrestler best known for his tenure in the World Wrestling Federation under the names "Papa Shango" and "The Godfather".

In an April 2012 episode of NBC's Smash, the New York City club entrance can be seen when Megan Hilty's character Ivy Lynn walks down the street. It was also featured in Iggy Azalea's 2013 music video for "Change Your Life".

In 2019, the Las Vegas location was sold to The Library Gentlemen's Club, a California-based chain of gentlemen's clubs. The Cheetah's name was retired and replaced with The Library brand in 2020.

In addition to the former Cheetah's location in Las Vegas, The Library Gentlemen's Club also operates three locations in California: Westminster, Anaheim, and Redlands. Each location offers its own unique ambiance and entertainment options, but all share the same distinct brand style.

=== Jolene ===
One of their Los Angeles locations runs a show named "Jolene", which employs both cisgender and transgender women dancers.

== See also ==
- List of strip clubs
- Planning of the September 11, 2001 attacks
- Showgirls, 1995 film shot on location
- Operation G-Sting - About the FBI's "Operation G-Sting"
- Charles Wright - General manager of the club
- Brent Jordan, bouncer from 1991–2003 who wrote a book, Stripped, about working at the club
