= Palomino Club (Las Vegas) =

Las Vegas strip club

The Palomino Club is a landmark North Las Vegas strip club. Since 2006 the club has been owned by Adam Gentile.

== History ==
It was founded in 1969 but the building was built in the 1940s. One of the notable differences between the Palomino and other Las Vegas strip clubs, is that it is allowed to have both a liquor license, and totally nude dancers. Other clubs with liquor licenses are restricted to topless dancers. This difference, according to 2003-2006 owner Luis Hidalgo Jr., is because the club was grandfathered until approximately 2025 with the different rules. The new Palomino Club owner Adam Gentile has made the licenses permanent.

In 2000, a high-profile murder trial involved the Palomino Club owner's son, Jack Perry, who had shot and killed one of the employees he thought was trying to buy the club. He pleaded guilty and was sentenced to 14 years to life in prison.

In 2002, the owner of the "Olympic Garden" club sued the owners of the Palomino, claiming they conspired with cabdrivers to divert customers. It was evidently a common practice for some clubs, such as Palomino and Cheetah's, to offer $5–$25 per customer to cab drivers, to encourage the drivers to bring customers to their club instead of someone else's. This put "non-kickback" clubs such as the Olympic Garden at a disadvantage. The case was eventually dropped. (Jordan, 2004)

Luis Hidalgo, Jr., took over the club in 2003. One of the changes that he instituted was to start an all-male nude act, known as the "Palomino Stallions", to try to attract female customers.

In 2005, Luis Hidalgo Jr., his son, Luis Hidalgo III. and Hidalgo, Jr.'s longtime girlfriend, Anabel Espindola, were charged - and eventually found guilty - as co-conspirators in the contract murder of a former employee who had been telling competitors that Hidalgo Jr. was still paying cabdrivers to divert customers to the Palomino Club. Their former doorman, Timothy TJ Hadland, had been found shot dead on a road near Lake Mead on May 19, 2005, just two weeks after quitting the club. Three other Palomino employees, and the actual killer, were also found guilty on charges related to Hadland's killing. Their case was later shown on the TV show The First 48 on March 31, 2011 as a "Lost Episode".

In 2006, Hidalgo sold the club to Adam Gentile, in order to cover legal fees. Gentile's father, Dominic Gentile, is one of the city's more prominent defense attorneys, and received the payment from former Palomino owner Luis Hidalgo Jr. in exchange for Gentile's representation of Hidalgo in the investigation of the May 19, 2005, shooting death of Timothy Hadland. Adam Gentile, who had previously been the General Manager of Club Paradise, is still the current owner as of 2023.

In 2009 Gentile let cameras into the club to film King Of Clubs, a new reality series slated to premiere in Fall 2009 on Playboy TV. That same year (2009), Hidalgo Jr. and his son were sentenced to life in prison. Anabel Espindola, the girlfriend of Luis Hidalgo Jr., took a plea deal for voluntary manslaughter in exchange for her testimony.

== See also ==
- List of strip clubs
- Operation G-Sting
