= Le Strip =

Canadian strip club

Le Strip was a strip club in Toronto, Ontario, Canada. Whilst the club is now closed, former dancers; escorts; bouncers; and promoters of the club, an 18-year-old or older establishment, and the last legal all-ages one of its kind, have expressed an interest within local media of a historical retrospective provided by the City of Toronto concerning the history of licensing of adult clubs and dancers in the city.

== Interior design ==
According to local reports, the inside of the club was a mess, with little in the official city books for regulation or regular inspection.

At the time, the area of the city was considered dangerous, described by one reporter as being "alive with sex, drugs, and music." In the years since the homicide of Emanuel Jaques, many efforts have been made to clean up the area between Front Street and Bloor Street, yet the onset of the era of legalization of drugs has jeopardized some element of city safety through increased petty crimes, including vandalism.

The music here was chosen carefully by the strippers themselves.The soundmen played tapes provided by the strippers. At the end the club was selling lifetime passes but these became useless when the place closed down a few weeks later

== See also ==
- List of strip clubs
- Licensing
