= The Brass Rail (Toronto) =

Gentlemen's club in Toronto, Ontario, Canada

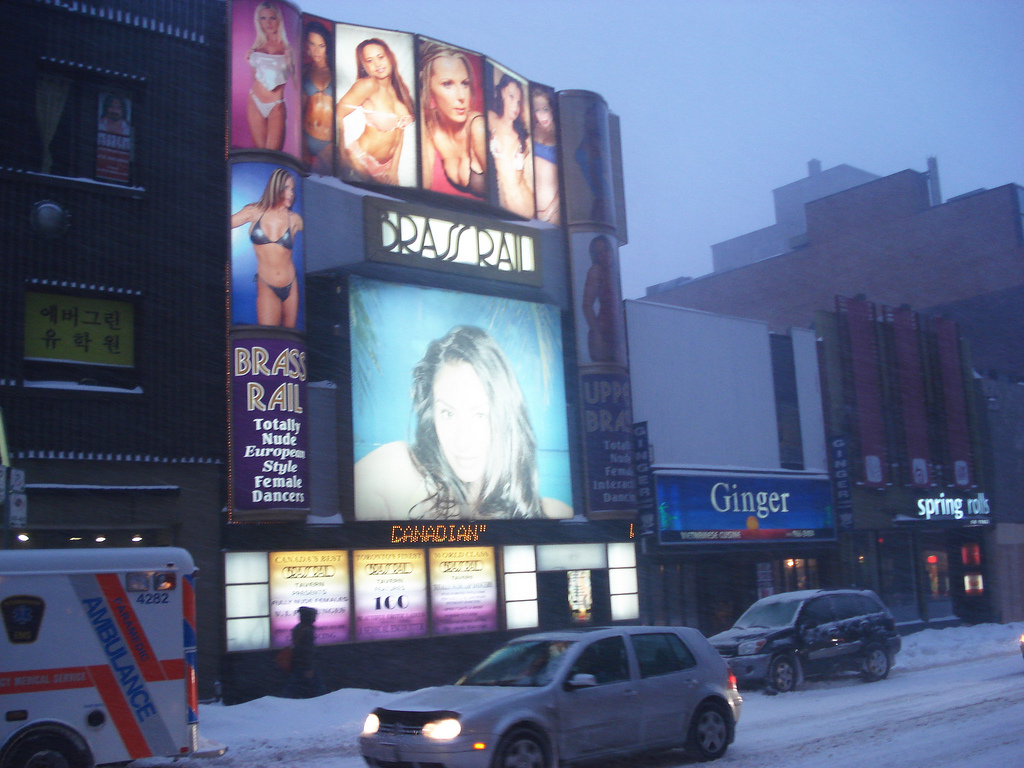
- The Brass Rail
- Interactive map of The Brass Rail
- Former names: Yonge Station
- Address: 699–701 Yonge Street; Toronto, Ontario; Canada
- Coordinates: 43.669128°N 79.386142°W
- Type: Strip club (previously restaurant, live music venue)

Construction
- Built: 1887 (building)
- Opened: 1948 (as Brass Rail Tavern)
- Closed: 31 December 2026 (scheduled)
Designations
Ontario Heritage Act
- Designated: February 2024

The Brass Rail is a strip club on Yonge Street in Toronto, Canada, scheduled to close on 31 December 2026. Established in 1948 as a restaurant and live music venue, it became a strip club during the 1970s and 1980s. The club has been associated with visiting celebrities, particularly during the Toronto International Film Festival.

== History ==
The Brass Rail occupies part of a three-storey commercial row on the east side of Yonge Street, south of Bloor Street. The building was constructed in 1887, replacing an earlier one-storey structure on the site. It was originally divided into four commercial units that housed a succession of businesses during the late 19th and early 20th centuries.

In 1948, the commercial units at 699 and 701 Yonge Street were combined and converted into the Brass Rail Tavern. The establishment initially operated as a restaurant and tavern that presented live performances by local and touring musicians. The City of Toronto's heritage research identifies 1948 as the beginning of the Brass Rail at the site, although the club has subsequently promoted 1958 as its founding date.

The premises underwent several exterior alterations over the following decades. A new facade was installed at 699–701 Yonge Street in 1962, and the frontage was reclad with wood siding in the early 1970s. Large illuminated signs that later became a prominent feature of the club's appearance were added during the 1990s and 2000s.

During the 1950s and 1960s, the Brass Rail formed part of Yonge Street's expanding live-entertainment district. By the late 1960s and early 1970s, it increasingly incorporated adult entertainment as the character of the surrounding Yonge Street strip shifted from live music toward bars, strip clubs and other adult-oriented businesses. A 1970 photograph reproduced in the City of Toronto's heritage study shows the Brass Rail Tavern advertising "Topless Girls" on its marquee.

During the 1970s, the establishment operated under the name Yonge Station while continuing to feature live music. Musician Paul Shaffer, who had moved to Toronto from Thunder Bay, worked at the venue early in his career as a musician and master of ceremonies.

In the 1980s, the establishment returned to the Brass Rail name and completed its transition into a full-time strip club. It subsequently became one of the best-known surviving adult-entertainment establishments on Yonge Street.

The club became particularly associated with visiting celebrities during the Toronto International Film Festival, whose events and luxury hotels are concentrated in nearby Yorkville. Celebrities reported at the Brass Rail have included Samuel L. Jackson, Colin Farrell, Charlize Theron and Alex Rodriguez.

=== Proposed redevelopment and closure ===
In 2022, developer Concord Adex Investments proposed replacing the Brass Rail and neighbouring properties at 699–707 Yonge Street with a 64-storey condominium tower containing 514 residential units. The proposal called for retaining the Yonge Street facade of the existing building, incorporating it into the base of the new development. The properties were designated under the Ontario Heritage Act in February 2024.

Toronto City Council rejected the proposed zoning changes in July 2025, citing concerns about the tower's size and its relationship to the heritage buildings. The developer appealed the decision to the Ontario Land Tribunal. In April 2026, the city also opposed proposed alterations to the heritage facade, including changes to the ground-floor storefronts.

The Brass Rail is scheduled to close on 31 December 2026. Its closure follows that of Filmores Hotel in January 2026 and the indefinite closure of the Zanzibar Tavern following a fire in August 2026, leaving the future of adult-entertainment establishments on downtown Yonge Street uncertain.

=== Lap-dancing litigation ===
During the 1990s and early 2000s, the Brass Rail became involved in litigation over the legality of lap dancing. The club deliberately defied a Toronto bylaw restricting lap dancing and was among adult-entertainment establishments involved in court proceedings concerning whether physical contact between dancers and patrons constituted indecent acts under the Criminal Code.

The litigation occurred against the background of several Supreme Court of Canada decisions concerning indecency in adult-entertainment establishments, including R v Mara in 1997 and R. v. Pelletier in 1999.

== See also ==
- List of strip clubs
