= List of strippers =

This is a list of strippers.

== Strippers of the past ==
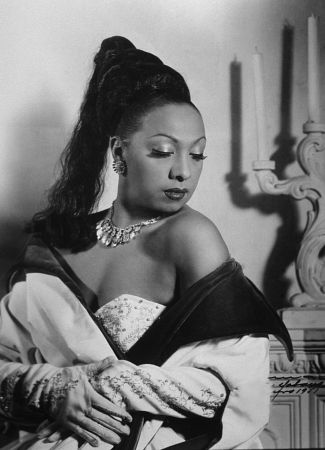
Josephine Baker in Havana, Cuba (1950)

- Ann Corio
- April March (born Velma Fern Worden)
- Bernie Barker, world's oldest male stripper
- Blaze Starr (born Fannie Belle Fleming)
- Candy Barr (born Juanita Dale Slusher)
- Carol Doda (born Carol Ann Doda)
- Charmion
- Chesty Morgan (born Ilona Wilczkowska)
- Evelyn West (born Amy Mae Coomer)
- Faith Bacon (born Frances Yvonne Bacon)
- Fanne Foxe (born Annabel Villagra)
- Glenda Kemp
- Gypsy Rose Lee (aka Rose Louise Hovick, Louise Hovick)
- Jennie Lee (aka The Bazoom Girl)
- Josephine Baker/Joséphine Baker
- Jean Mode
- Lili St. Cyr (born Willis Marie Van Schaack)
- Louise Wightman (Princess Cheyenne)
- Mara Gaye (born Marjorie Helen Ginsberg)
- Mata Hari (born Margaretha Geertruida [Grietje] Zelle)
- Maud Allan
- Phyllis Dixey
- Sally Rand (born Harriet Helen Gould Beck)
- Satan's Angel (born Angel Cecelia Helene Walker)
- Sayuri Ichijō, Japan's most famous sex performer of the early 1970s, and star of director Tatsumi Kumashiro's Ichijo's Wet Lust (1972)
- Tempest Storm (born Annie Blanche Banks)
- Vednita Carter

== Contemporary strippers ==
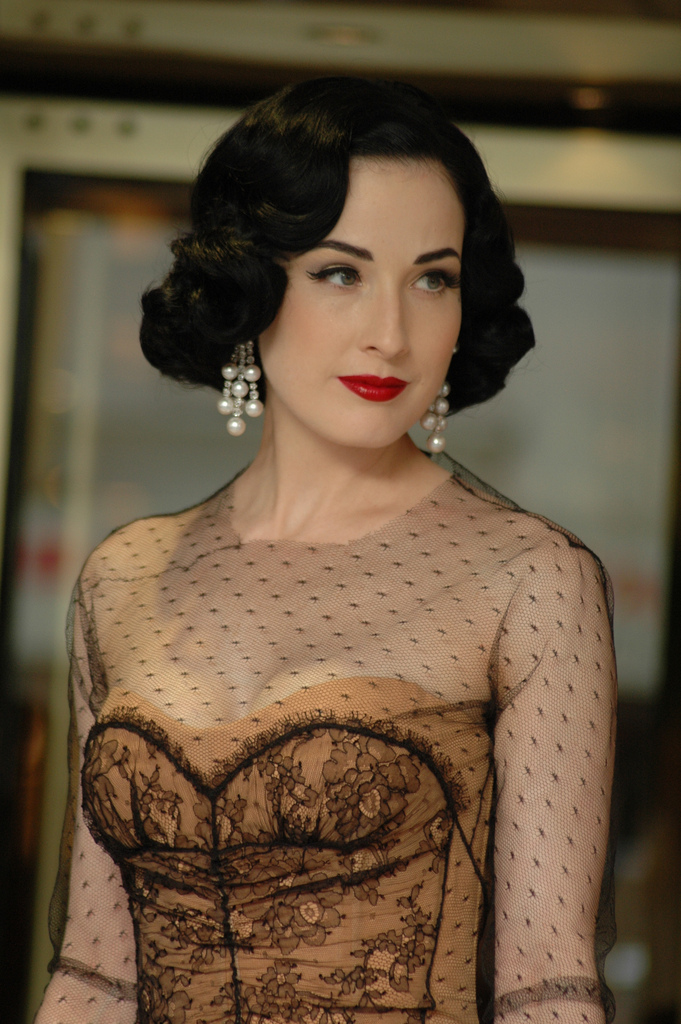
Dita Von Teese at the 2007 Cannes Film Festival

- Australia's Thunder from Down Under, international male review
- Andressa Urach, former Brazilian stripper, now pastor
- Anna Nicole Smith (born: Vickie Lynn Marshall), former TV personality
- Brianna Taylor, reality show personality, singer and songwriter
- Cardi B, rapper
- Channing Tatum, American fashion model, actor, and film producer
- Chippendales, male dancer franchise
- Courtney Love, front person for the American band Hole
- Danni Ashe, erotic model and pioneer businesswoman in online adult industry
- Dita Von Teese (born Heather Renée Sweet), American burlesque artist, model and actress
- Diablo Cody, noted for writing a memoir about her year as a stripper
- Elisabeth Eaves, former stripper and author
- Heather Veitch, founder of JC's Girls, ministry offering strippers resources on pursuing a life outside of the adult entertainment industry
- Jenna Jameson, entrepreneur and former leading pornographic actress
- Lady Gaga, (born Stefani Joanne Angelina Germanotta), American pop recording artist
- Lily Burana, former stripper and author of Strip City
- Lindsey Normington, American stripper, actress, writer, director who played an active role in unionizing the first strip club in the United States
- Mickey Faerch, Danish-Canadian burlesque performer, actress, and rapper
- Missy Malone, Scottish burlesque performer, actress and model
- Morganna (born Morganna Roberts), former stripper and exotic dancer for the Flamingo Club in Baltimore, aka "Morganna the Kissing Bandit", known for her numerous stunts involving kissing baseball players during games.
- ppcocaine, rapper and TikTok celebrity.
- Mia Khalifa, a former singer and adult film actress
- Stormy Daniels, stripper and pornographic actress
- Sunny Leone, former stripper and Indian film actress
- Tila Tequila (born Tila Nguyễn), singer, model, and television personality

== See also ==
- List of strip clubs
- Behind the Burly Q, a 2010 documentary about the golden age of burlesque.
