= Leroy Griffith =

American theater and nightclub proprietor (1932–2026)

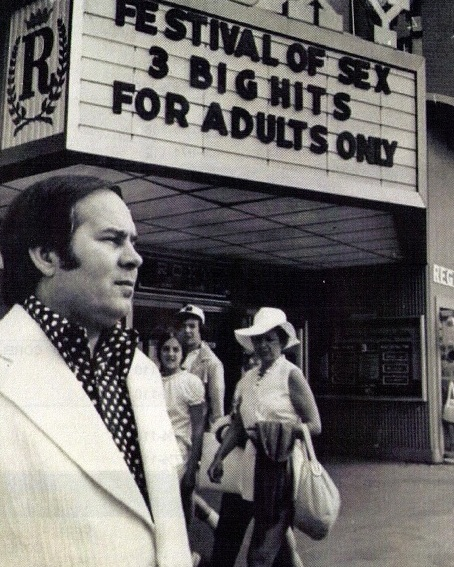
- Outside his Roxy Theater in Miami Beach, Fla., 1973.
- Born: March 26, 1932; Poplar Bluff, Missouri, U.S.
- Died: October 3, 2026 (aged 94); Miami, Florida, U.S.
- Occupations: Theater and nightclub owner; Broadway and off-Broadway producer; Film producer; Burlesque producer
- Years active: 1949–2024
- Known for: Stage shows (Hello Burlesque, This Was Burlesque, etc.); chief executive officer of Club Madonna
- Spouses: Carolyne Sandler (m. 1958); Joy Hodges (div. 1964); Juanita Gilreath (div. 1969); Linda Rivera (m. 1989)
- Children: 5
- Military career
- Allegiance: United States
- Branch: United States Army
- Rank: First lieutenant
- Website: instagram.com/theleroygriffith

Leroy Charles Griffith (March 26, 1932 – October 3, 2026) was an American theater and nightclub proprietor, Broadway and off-Broadway theater producer and director, and burlesque and adult film producer. In a career spanning 75 years, he owned, leased, or operated more than 70 theaters, cinemas, and nightclubs across the United States, dating from the burlesque era of the 1950s to the 2020s. Earl Wilson, among others, nicknamed him "Burlesque King."

During burlesque's heyday, Griffith was a prolific producer of live stage shows featuring showgirls, strippers, comedians, vaudevillians, and other stars of the era. As burlesque declined in popularity, he made the crossover to exhibiting as well as producing adult films and operating strip clubs, notably past and present Miami-area clubs such as Club Madonna, Deja Vu, and Wonderland.

For decades, his business endeavors in the adult entertainment industry put him at odds with restrictive municipalities. He took legal action, often successfully, to defend his constitutional rights and be able to operate his establishments. His and others' trailblazing victories helped to make the adult entertainment industry more accepted and tolerated in 20th and 21st century American society.

== Early years ==
Griffith was born in Poplar Bluff, Missouri, to Stella Duncan (1909–1961) and Floyd Roy Griffith (1909–1984). His father was a theater manager, police officer, and concession stand operator. The younger Griffith served as a projectionist, cashier, and usher at local theaters in his hometown. He started out selling popcorn at his father's Strand Theater and was a concessions operator at the Jewel Theater, both in Poplar Bluff. Decades later, the senior Griffith relocated to Florida to work for his son's expanding theatrical empire.

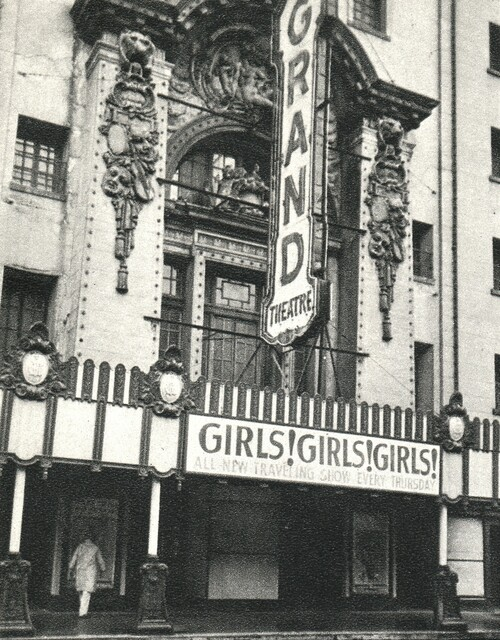
At age 17, Griffith left a small town and got his big-city start selling candy in the since-demolished Grand Burlesque Theatre in St. Louis, Mo.

At 17, Leroy Griffith left for St. Louis and a job working concessions at the Grand Burlesque Theatre for East Coast-based theater concessions magnate Oscar Markovich (1895–1982). At the Grand, Griffith started as a "candy butcher," hawking candy and trinkets to burlesque audiences before and during intermission. "In those days," Griffith recalled in a 1993 interview, "they had probably 30 people in the cast, a chorus line, an orchestra, two comics, a singer, a vaudeville act, and then five exotic dancers. It was a good show."

Griffith discovered that any profit to be made was not from the show itself but from the concession stand: "That's where I was. In between acts, the pitchman would sell prize packages, candy, stuff like that. Concessions was where the real money was, just like it is with regular movies today." After working his way up to concessions manager, Griffith began accruing money for higher ambitions.

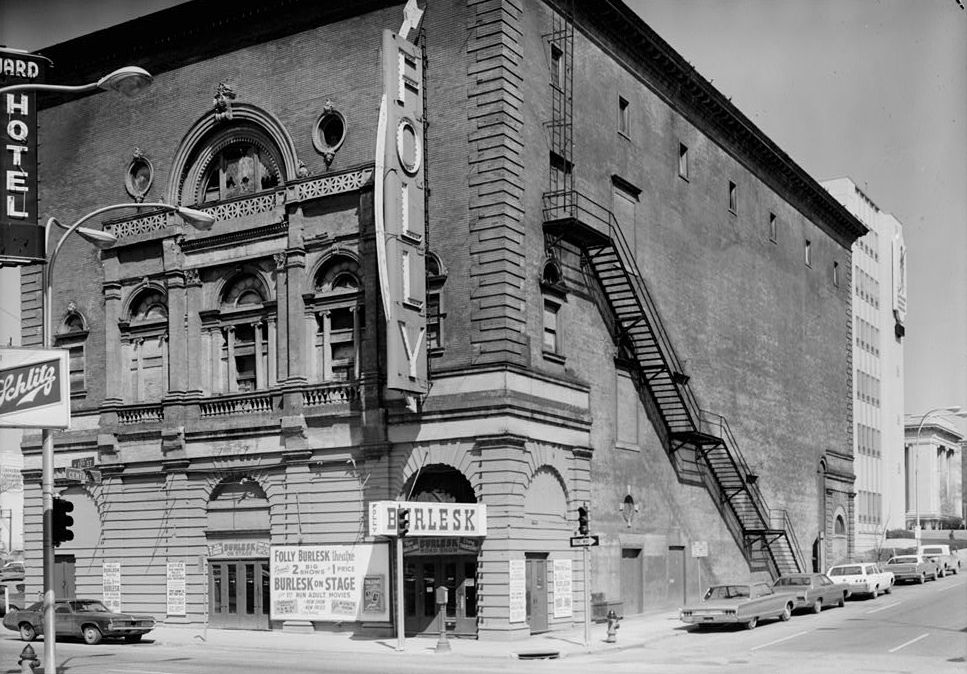
The Folly Theater

A June 1955 Billboard magazine column noted that the 23-year-old "Leroy Griffith, concession manager at the Folly [Theater], Kansas City, Mo., is now the owner of the Missouri Coffee Shop with an enlarged dining room and a new air-conditioned system."

=== Military service ===
In 1955, Griffith was drafted into service with the U.S. Army in Hot Springs, Arkansas. While stationed at Elmendorf Air Force Base in Anchorage, Alaska, he worked with Bob Hope's USO show (featuring Jerry Colonna, Mickey Mantle, and Ginger Rogers, among others) when Hope was on tour there in December 1956.

== Career ==
After an early discharge from the military, Griffith managed his first theater, the Garden in Detroit, Michigan. He was 25.

A 1959 Billboard article described Griffith as one of the "brigade of regulars" employed by the popular King Reid Shows, a carnival that traveled the New England and Canada circuit and which was founded by Vermont showman and state legislator "King" Reid Lefèvre (1904–1968). Griffith managed the carnival's popular "Club 17 Revue," which featured burlesque shows.

=== Theater and club owner ===
Identifying "legitimate theaters" that were going out of business, Griffith began acquiring them. "These places would go under," he said in a 1993 interview, "and I'd go in and take over and make them successful with an adult policy." He gradually acquired scores of theaters throughout the United States.

Converting such theaters to adult fare proved popular and lucrative. He recounted to the New York Times in 1970 that he built a brand new theater and showed The Sound of Music, but lost money. Upon switching to an adult policy, he reaped $4,000 the first week (equivalent to $32,000 in 2024).

=== Burlesque producer ===
Griffith told the New York Times that he became interested in burlesque while a concession manager for Harold Minsky's burlesque houses in Chicago. From the late 1950s to the late 1960s, he was one of the nation's leading producers of burlesque entertainment. Entertainment columnist Earl Wilson called him the "new Minsky" and he and other newspapermen often referred to Griffith as "Burlesque King." In 1966, the New York branch manager of the American Guild of Variety Artists, which exercised jurisdiction over burlesque throughout the nation, told the New York Times that Griffith was the largest producer in the field.

Nightly, and during matinees, the curtains went up in Griffith's circuit of theaters throughout the country — from small cities such as Fort Wayne, Indiana, to metropolises like Chicago and New York City — with live shows featuring showgirls, strippers, comedians, vaudevillians, and other performing stars of the era.

Among the countless burlesque performers hired by Griffith were Candy Barr, Virginia Bell, Dixie Evans, Lili St. Cyr, Blaze Starr, and Tempest Storm.

Even as burlesque's popularity faded in the 1960s, one of Griffith's Miami Beach theaters was reported to be thriving as one of the 20 remaining burlesque theaters in the nation. When finally the genre ceased to be a popular and profitable attraction, one of its last remaining producers adapted to changing tastes and times, converting his burlesque houses to adult film theaters and strip clubs.

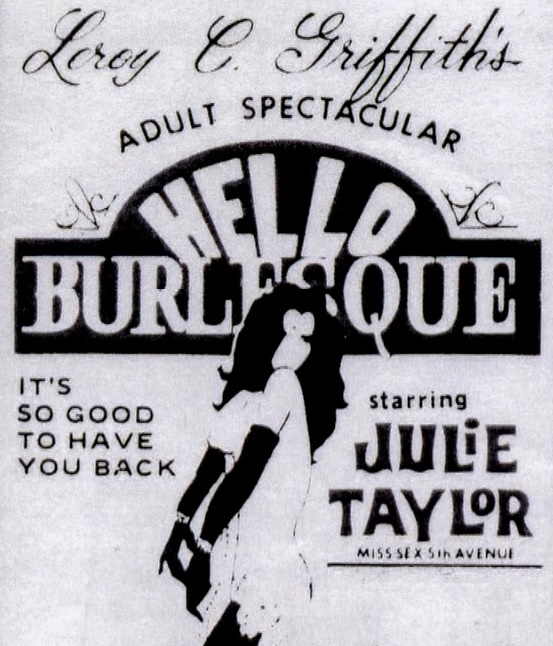
A promotional poster for Griffith's Broadway revue, Hello Burlesque.

=== Broadway and off-Broadway producer ===
Griffith directed and co-produced The Wonderful World of Burlesque, an off-Broadway show that ran for 211 performances at the Mayfair Theater, from April to June 1965.

He also produced Hello Burlesque, a 1965 show featuring showgirl Julie Taylor, "Miss Sex 5th Avenue."

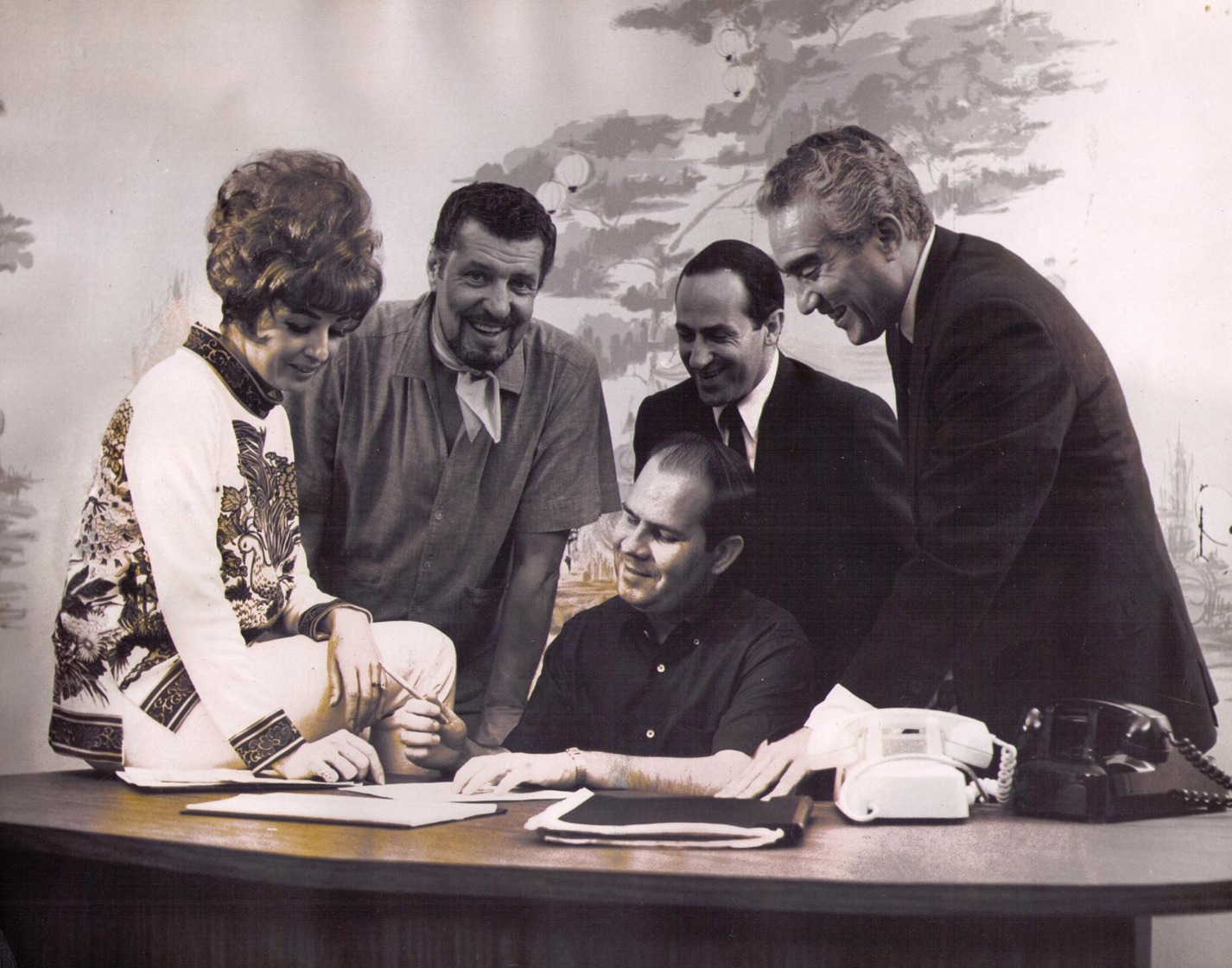
Signing his Mundo depravados co-stars Tempest Storm and Herb Jeffries (left) to film contracts in 1967.

=== Adult film producer ===
Griffith produced the sexploitation films Bell, Bare and Beautiful (1963) starring Virginia Bell, Lullaby of Bareland (1964), The Case of the Stripping Wives (1966), Mundo depravados (1967) starring Tempest Storm, and My Third Wife, George (1968). These films were exhibited in nationwide screenings, then later released in video format.

He was one of the first producers ever to hire a bi-racial couple to star in a film when he cast Tempest Storm and Herb Jeffries, "Hollywood's First Black Singing Cowboy," as the stars of his 1967 film Mundo depravados. Storm's 1959 marriage to Jeffries, according to the New York Times, "broke midcentury racial taboos, costing her work". Interracial marriage in the U.S. was not declared legal until a 1967 Supreme Court ruling.

== Griffith's theaters and clubs ==
Griffith owned, leased, or operated more than 70 theaters, cinemas, and nightclubs throughout the U.S., mostly concentrated in the Northeast, the Rust Belt, and the South. He also operated theaters in the Pacific Northwest.

=== Mid-Atlantic U.S. ===
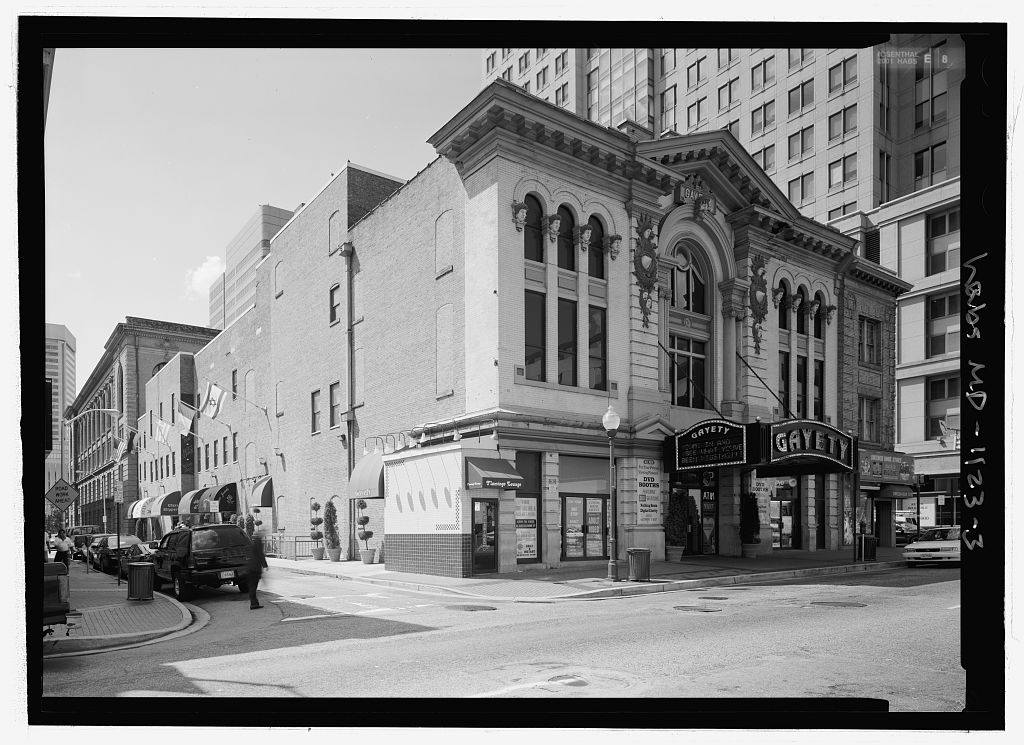
Baltimore's Gayety

Griffith's theaters in the Mid-Atlantic region included:

- The Gayety (Baltimore, Maryland)
- The Gayety Burlesque (Washington, D.C.)
- The Paris (Baltimore)

=== Midwestern U.S. ===
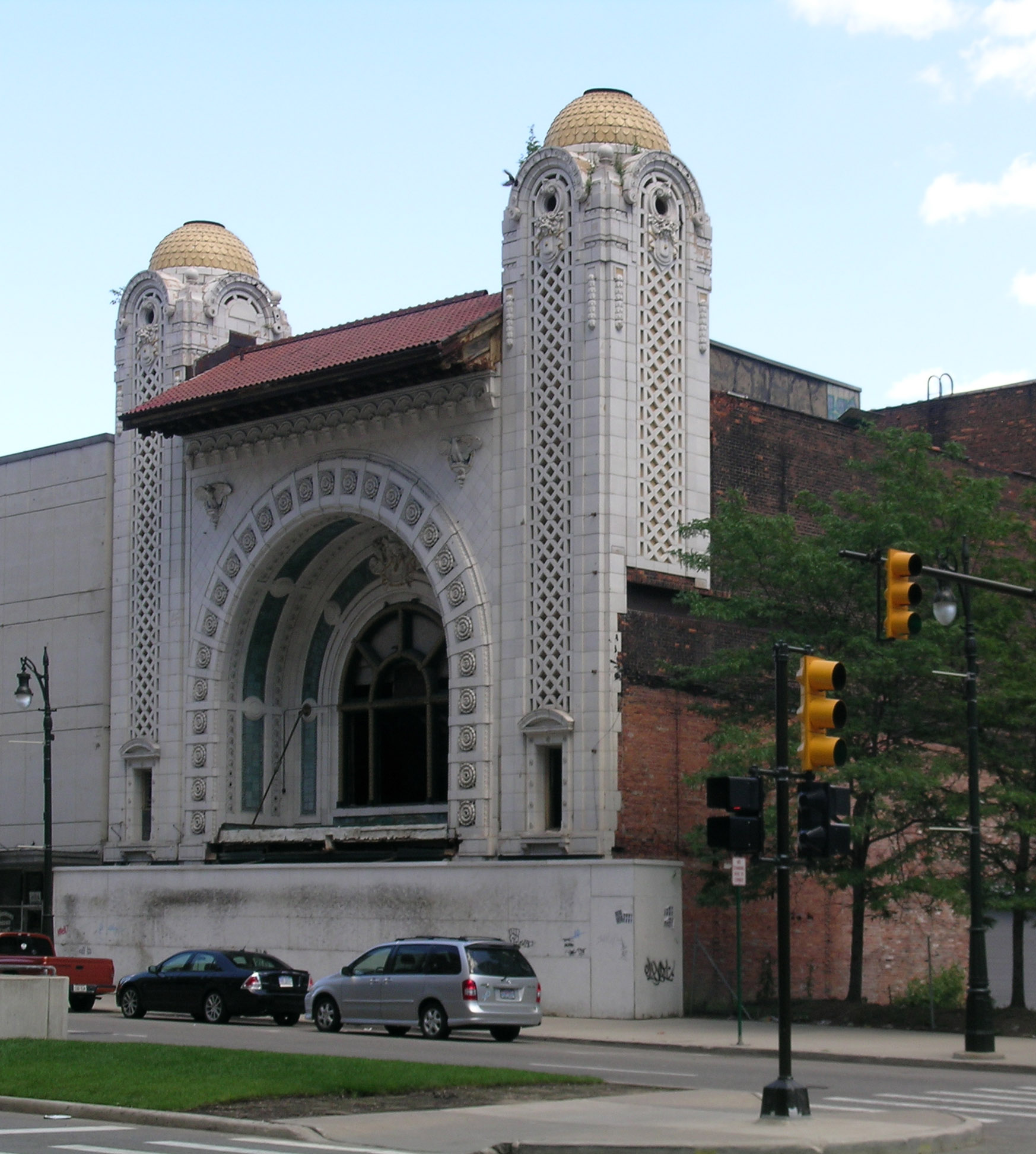
Detroit's National Theater

Griffith's theaters in the Midwest included:

- The Follies (Chicago, Illinois)
- The Garden (Detroit, Michigan)
- The Little Cinema (Fort Wayne, Indiana)
- The Michigan (Flint, Michigan)
- The National Gayety (Detroit)
- The Rialto (Chicago)
- The Ritz (Indianapolis, Indiana)
- The Strand (Kansas City, Missouri)
- The Tower Arts (Superior, Wisconsin)

==== Ohio ====
Griffith was co-operator of Toledo's Town Hall Theater with "Queen of Burlesque" Rose La Rose (1916–1972), a nationally renowned stripper who, having shrewdly saved and invested her earnings, retired in 1958, settled in Toledo, and purchased the Town Hall and, eventually, another local theater. She was one of the rare women on the burlesque circuit to evolve from performer to theater owner in her own right.

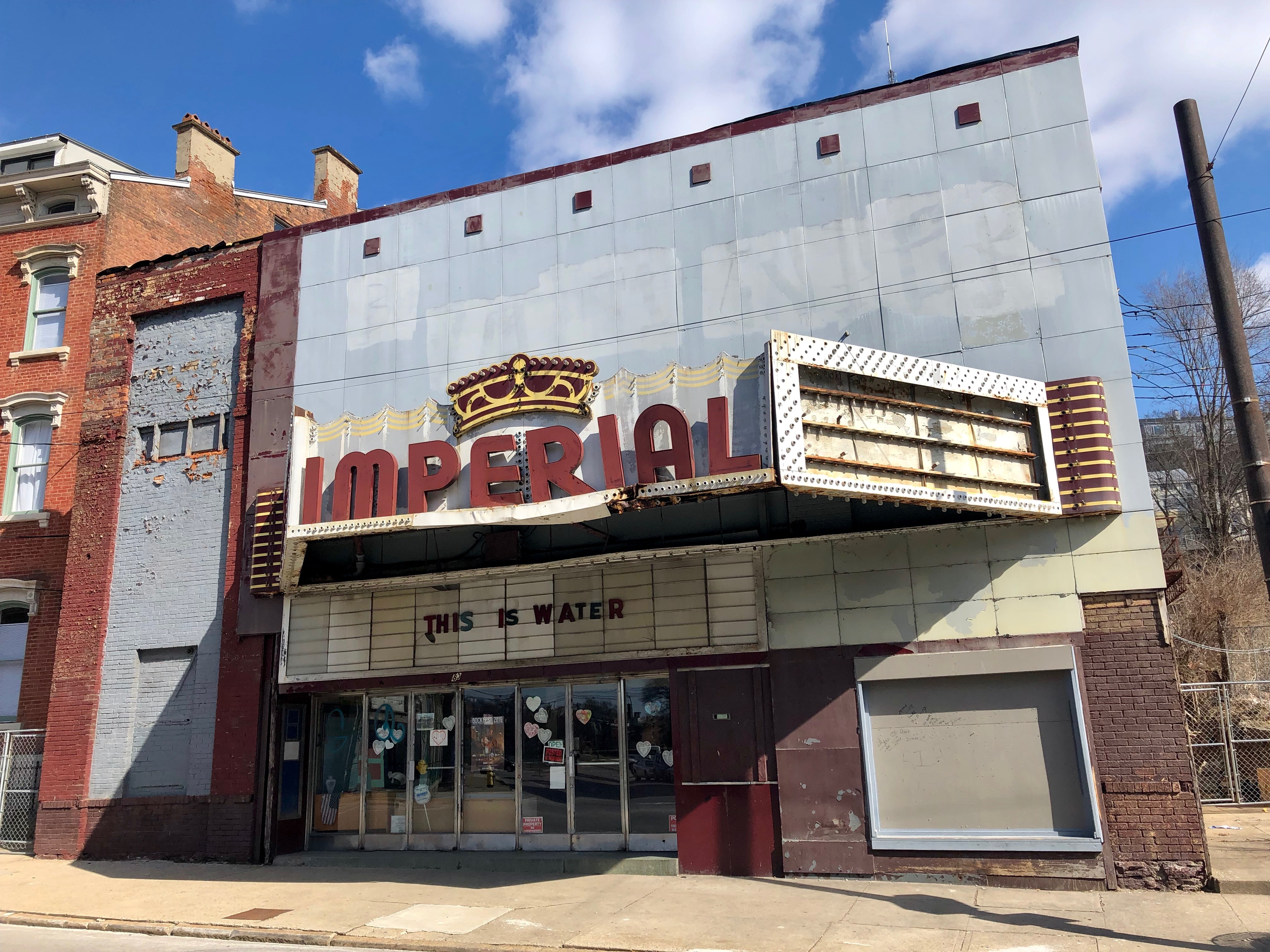
Cincinnati's Imperial

Griffith's other Ohio theaters included:

- The Gayety Burlesk (Cincinnati)
- The Gayety (Toledo)
- The Imperial Follies (Cincinnati)
- The Little Art (Columbus)
- The Livingston (Columbus)
- The Mayfair (Dayton)
- The Ohio (Steubenville)
- The Parsons Follies (Columbus)
- The State (Geneva-on-the-Lake)
- The Strand (Youngstown)
- The University (Cleveland)

=== Northeastern U.S. ===
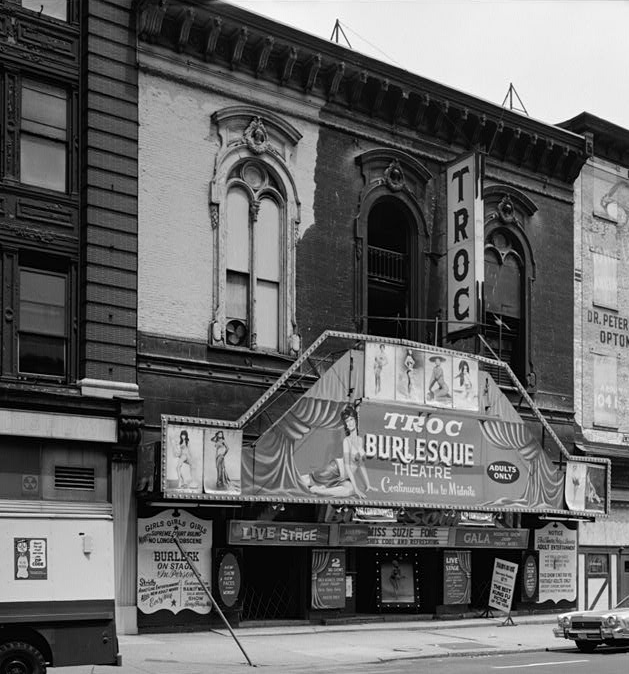
Philadelphia's Trocadero ("The Troc"), in 1973

Griffith's theaters in the Northeast included:

- The Aardvark (Philadelphia, Pennsylvania)
- The Cameraphone (Pittsburgh, Pennsylvania)
- The Civic Follies (Syracuse, New York)
- The Howard Follies (Philadelphia)
- The Luxor Follies (Newark, New Jersey)
- The Treat (Newark)
- The Regent Follies (Erie, Pennsylvania)
- The Trocadero (Philadelphia)

==== New York City ====
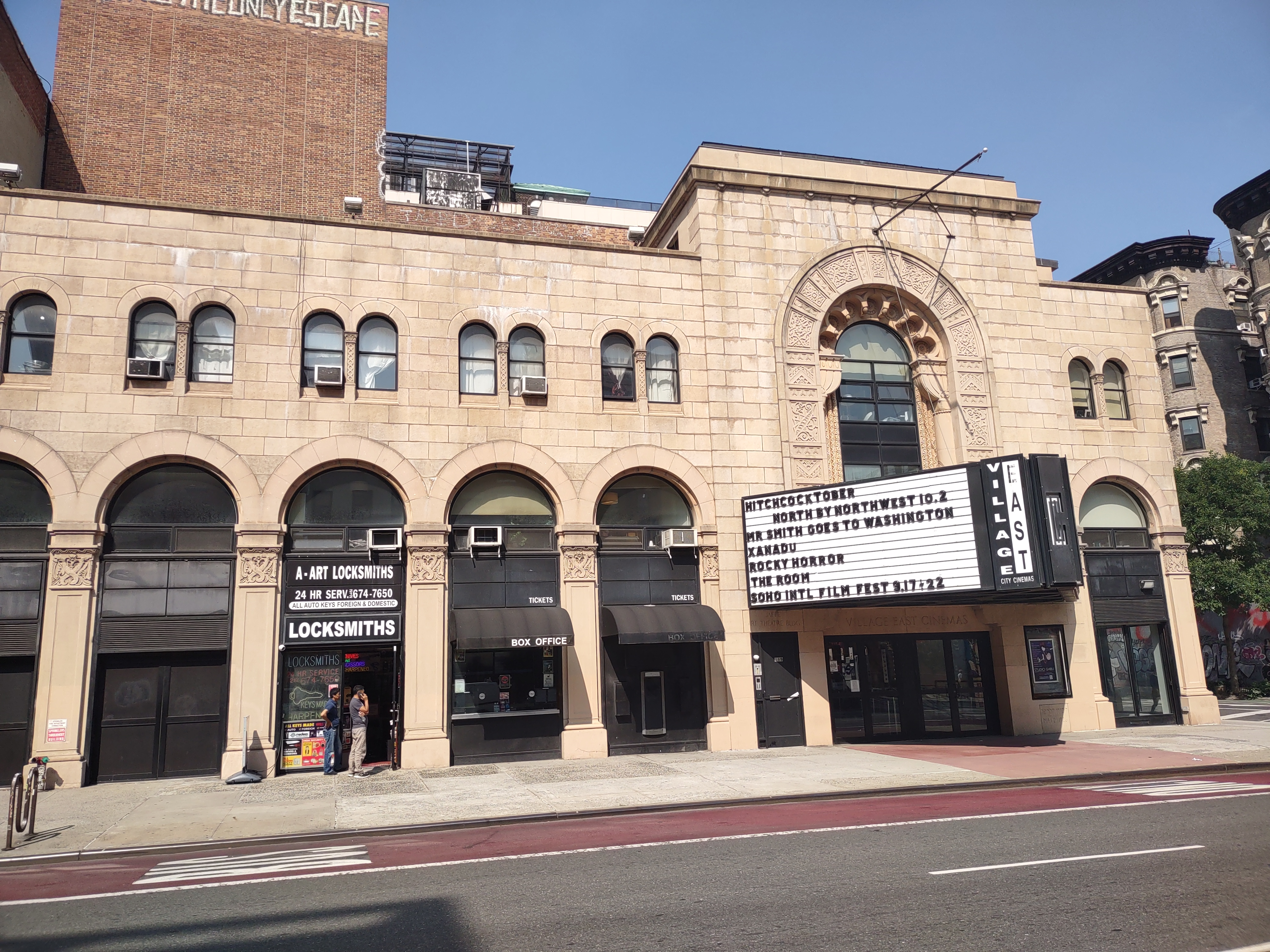
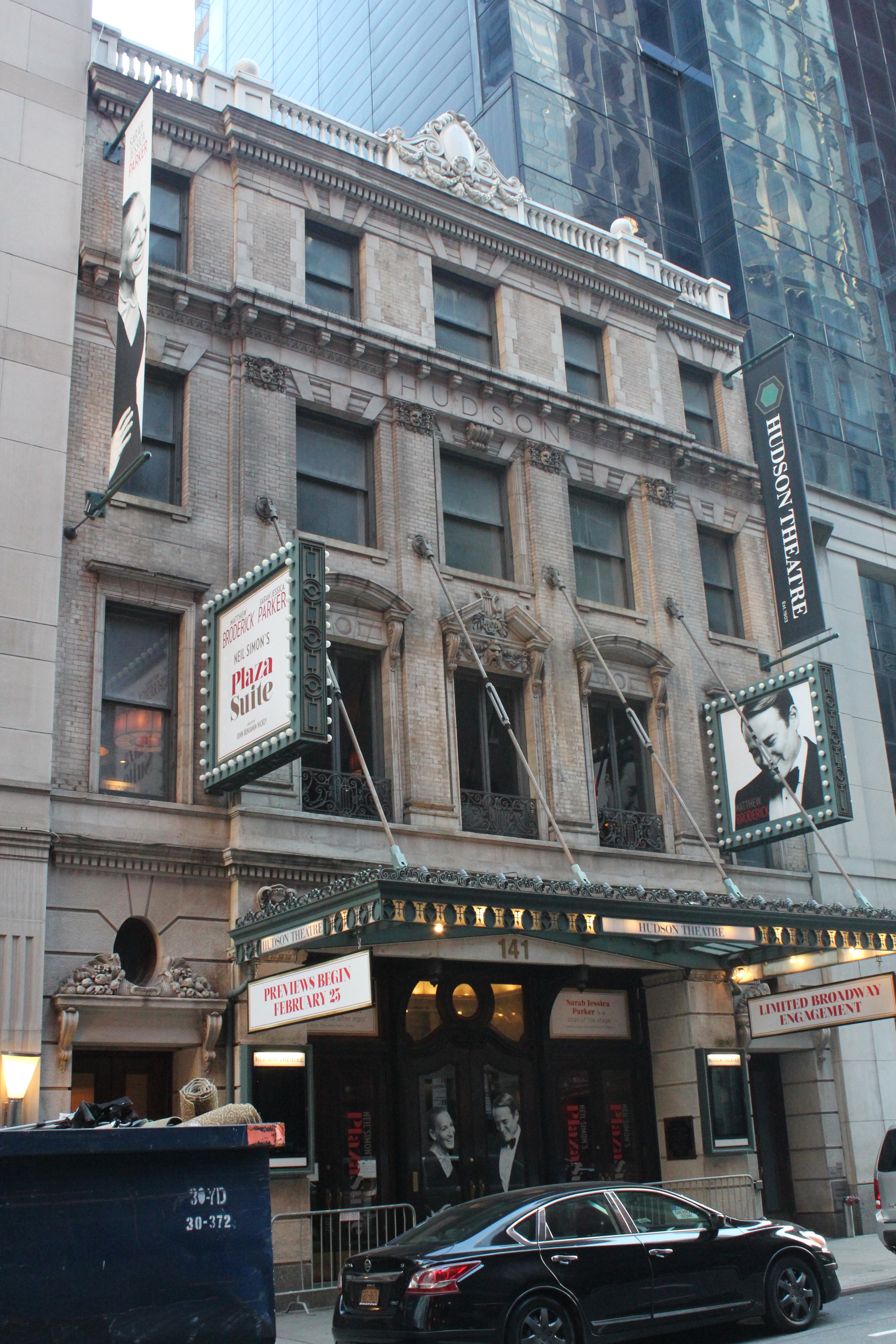
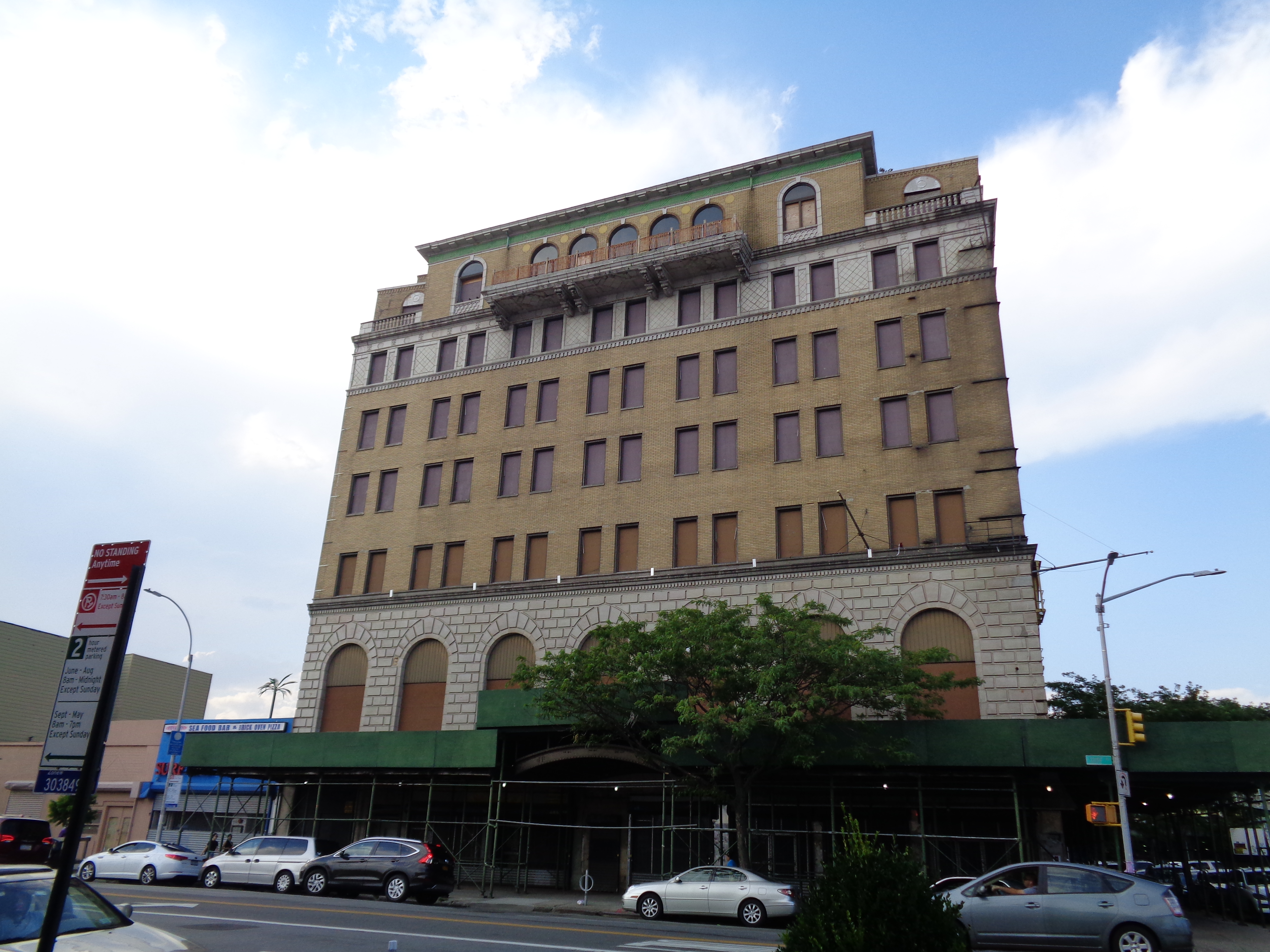
Three of Griffith's New York City theaters: The Gayety, Hudson, and Shore.

During the 1960s and 1970s, Griffith operated five theaters in New York City: the Gayety, the Hudson, the Mayfair Burlesque, and the Metropolitan, all in Manhattan; and the Shore on Coney Island in Brooklyn.

His 1960s Broadway and off-Broadway burlesque productions were staged in some of his Manhattan theaters, such as the Hudson and the Mayfair Burlesque.

The Mayfair Burlesque (now Sony Hall) was previously Billy Rose's popular Diamond Horseshoe nightclub, located in the basement level of the Paramount Hotel near Times Square.

=== Northwestern U.S. ===
Griffith's theaters in the Northwest included:

- The Capitol (Portland, Oregon)
- The Rivoli (Seattle, Washington)
- The Star (Portland)

=== Southern U.S. ===
Griffith's theaters in the South included:

- The Astor (Charlotte, North Carolina)
- The Capitol (Chattanooga, Tennessee)
- The Carrollton (New Orleans, Louisiana)
- The Cine Royal (New Orleans)
- The Climax I and II (Charlotte)
- The Ritz (Charlotte)
- The Sinerama (New Orleans)

==== Florida ====
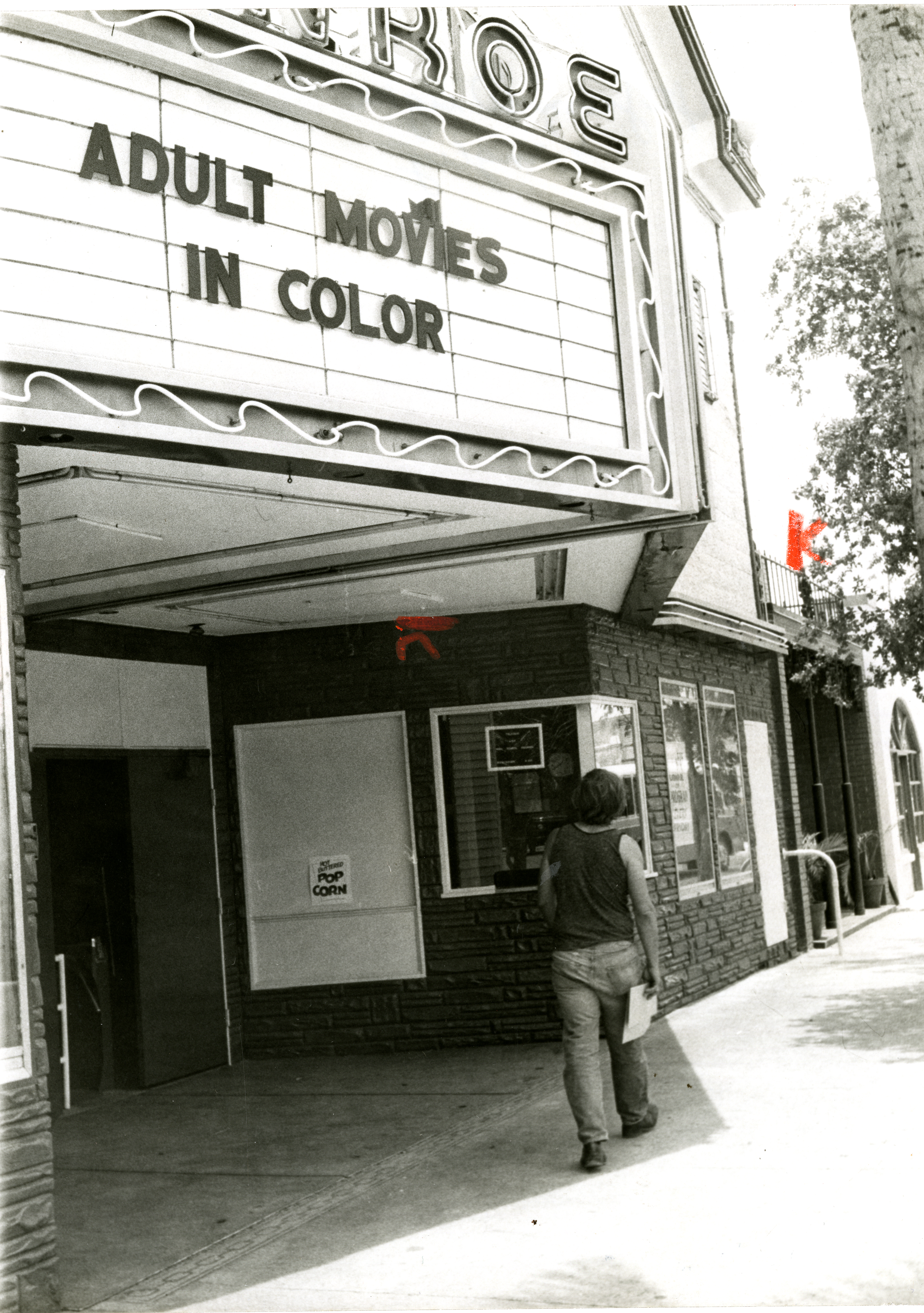
Key West's Monroe Theater, in 1977

In addition to various theaters throughout Miami and Miami Beach, Griffith operated these Florida theaters:

- Adam and Eve (Fort Lauderdale)
- The Atlas Twin (Hialeah)
- The Beach (Jacksonville Beach)
- The Casino Follies (Ybor City in Tampa)
- The Lake Shore (Jacksonville)
- The Little (Jacksonville)
- The Luv (Orlando)
- The Monroe (Key West)
- The Navy Point (Warrington)
- The Pussycat Cine Twin (Hollywood)
- The Ritz (Ybor City)
- The Roxy Follies (Jacksonville)

===== Miami =====
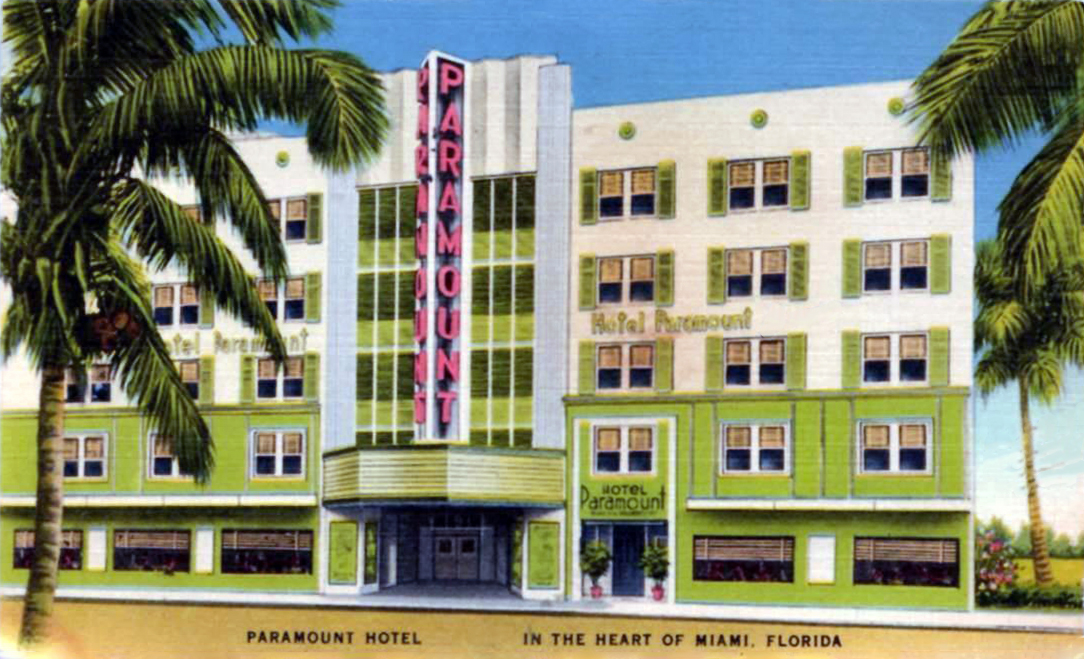
Miami's Paramount Hotel & Theater (c. 1942)

Griffith's Miami theaters included:

- The 79th Street Twin II Cinema (Little River)
- The Boulevard (on Biscayne Boulevard)
- The Dixie (downtown Miami)
- The Paramount (downtown Miami)
- The Rex Art (Little River)
- The Town (downtown Miami)

He bought the Boulevard in 1970 for $125,000 and renamed it the Pussycat, creating three different theaters within: the Pussycat, the center theater, was a 900-seat theater that showed adult films; the Kitty Cat featured female performers; and the Tomcat featured male performers. Later rebrandings of the theater-turned-strip club would include the names Wonderland and Gold Rush.

===== Miami Beach =====
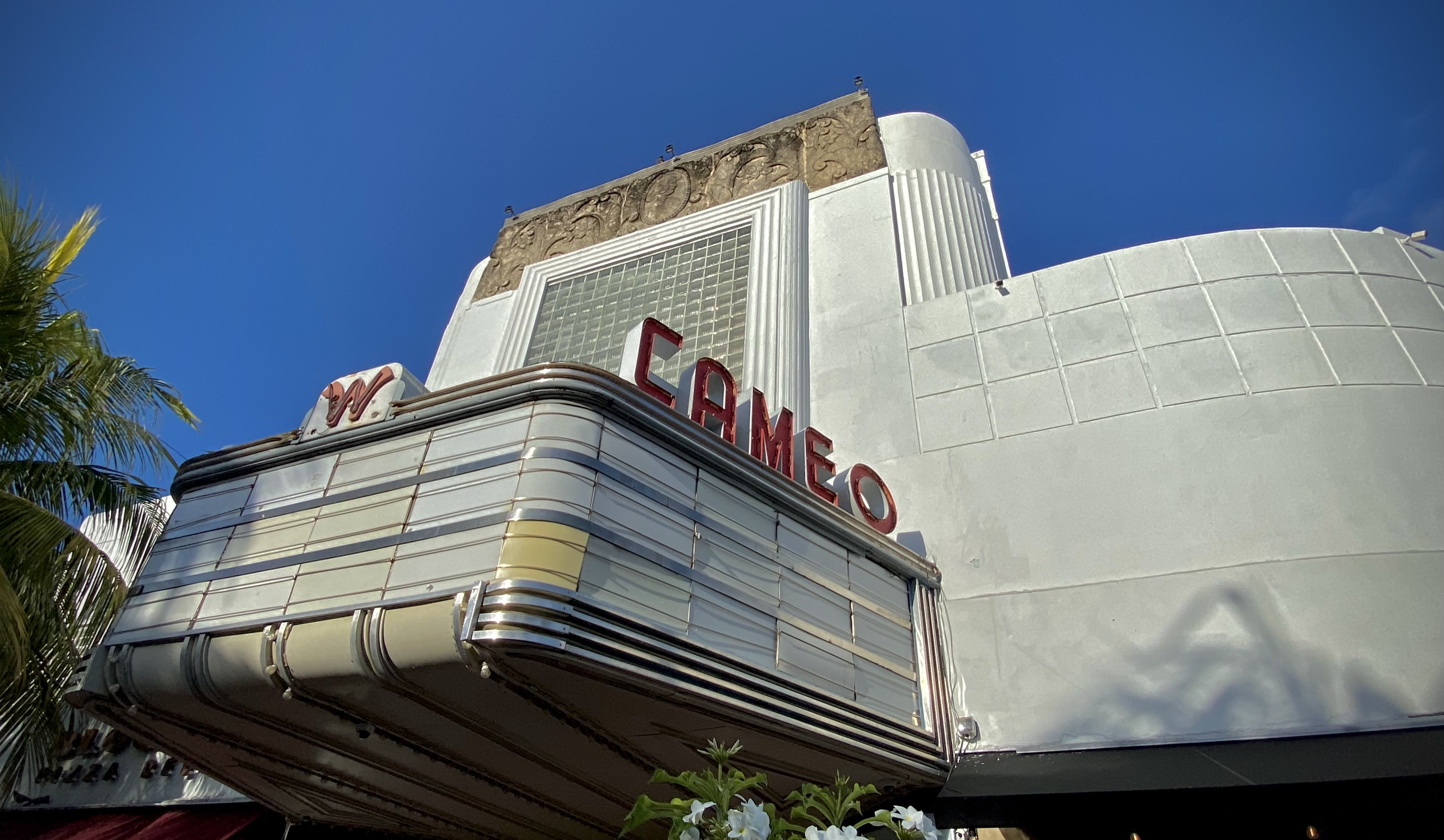
The Cameo

Griffith's theaters in Miami Beach included:

- The 21st Street Adult Theater
- The Beach
- The Cameo
- The Carib
- The Flamingo
- The Gayety
- The Paris
- The Plaza Art
- The Roxy

On a visit to Miami Beach in 1961, Griffith noticed the Paris Theater was for sale. He originally leased it, then bought it, and staged burlesque there, under the name Paris Follies. Featured headliners included Tempest Storm and Blaze Starr. He sold it in 1986, then bought it back after its owners failed with the nightclub Paris Moderne, and later sold it again.

But while he staged burlesque at the Paris in the early '60s, Griffith didn't call it "burlesque"; doing so would have been against local law.

"You couldn't even use the word," he recalled three decades later. "I had one big stage show called 'The Top Stars of Burlesque,' with Blaze Starr and all these people. I told the city, 'It's not burlesque. It's the top stars of burlesque. There's no law against the people of burlesque.' The city decided they'd fix me by charging me $1,000 for a special license to do the show. I said fine. I was going to have to pay $1,600 for a regular permit anyway."

In February 1963, Griffith appeared before the Miami Beach city council to plead for live stage burlesque to "liven up a dead town."

Griffith continued to open new venues throughout South Florida, from Broward County in the north to Key West in the south. In addition to bringing in live acts, he began showing movies. He also began producing films and exhibiting them in his theaters nationwide.

"I couldn't even use the word burlesque."

— Griffith, recalling local regulations in 1960s Miami Beach

As burlesque was petering out across the rest of the country, Griffith added the Gayety on Collins Avenue to his theater chain in July 1964. In 1965, the Gayety was reported to be thriving as one of the 20 remaining burlesque theaters in the nation. Later, as a strip club, its names would include SoBe Showgirls and Deja Vu. Across the street, he also operated the 21st Street Adult Theater (also known as the 21st Street Cinema).

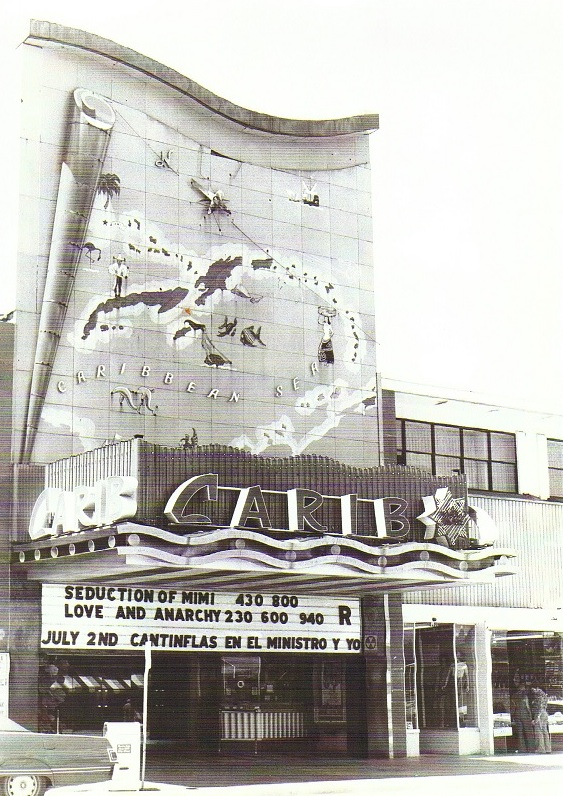
The Carib (c. 1976)

On the city's storied Lincoln Road, he had three theaters: the Beach, the Carib, and the Flamingo. "I used to do [benefit] shows at the Carib, which seated over 2,000 people," Griffith recounted in a 1993 interview, "and donated the theater, staff, advertising, and helped get talent. This all went to the widows and orphans of the firemen and the policemen."

On the city's other major thoroughfare, Washington Avenue, Griffith operated the Cameo, the Paris, the Plaza Art, and the Roxy. Griffith generated publicity at the Roxy when, in 1967, he publicly invited city officials to a screening of the film, Man and Wife. "It was advertised as the art of making love 49 different ways," he recalled in 1993. "I don't remember inviting them, but I vaguely remember the incident. I think that was the first hard-core movie ever shown down here." According to press accounts at the time, the officials seemed to think the movie was boring, but not obscene.

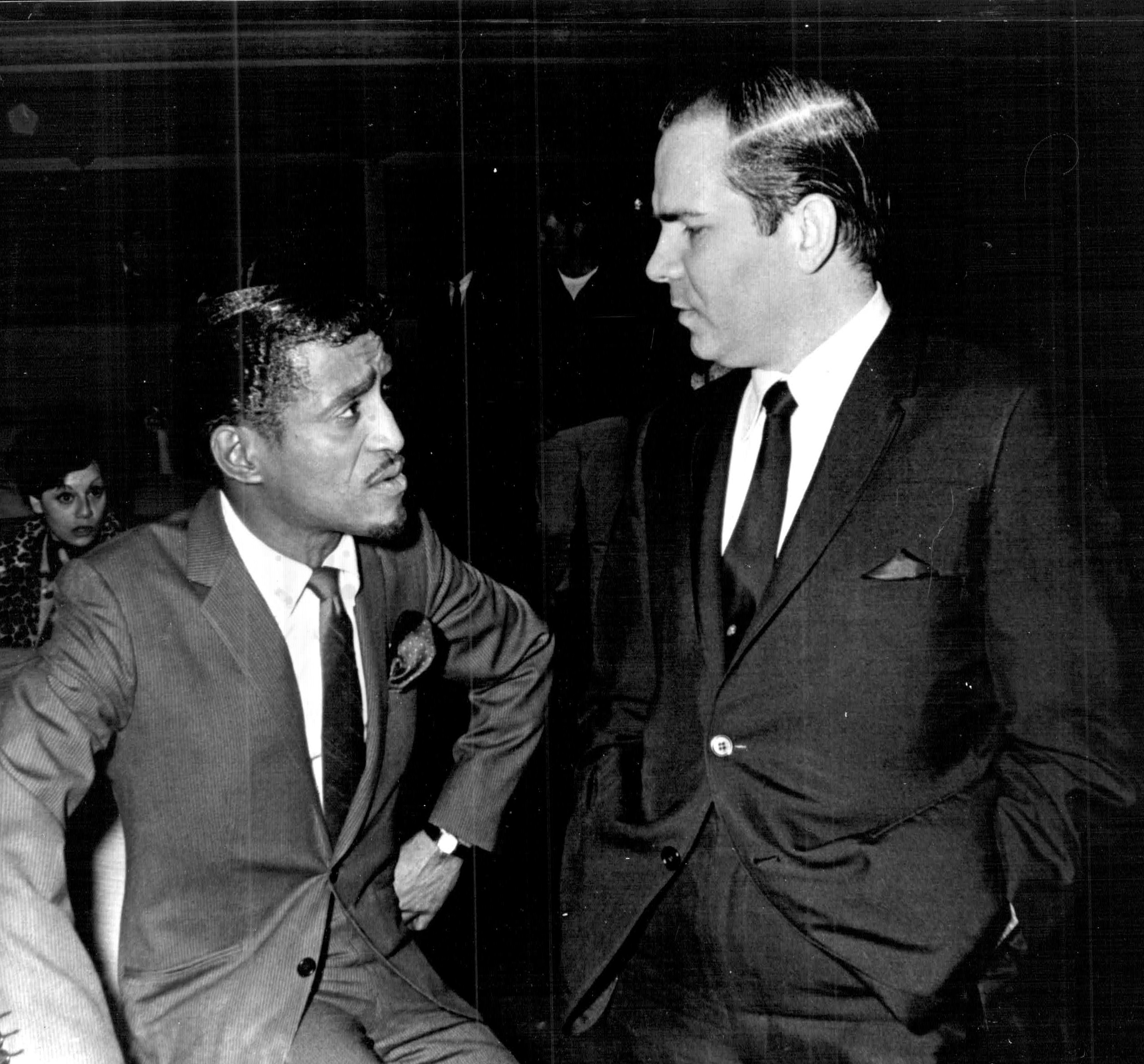
"One time Sammy Davis Jr. (above left, with Griffith in 1966), Frank Sinatra, and [comedian] Belle Barth came into the Gayety Theater [in Miami Beach] when I was running it. We had a Chinese dinner together, and then started watching the coming attractions for an X-rated film that was going to be running. For fun we shut the sound off and the three of them – Frank, Sammy, and Belle – improvised the sounds to go along with the scenes. They were all moaning and groaning and making funny noises. It was hysterical." — Griffith

A young Mickey Rourke once worked for Griffith as a cashier and projectionist in Miami Beach.

====== Che! firestorm ======
In 1971, Griffith briefly suspended showing adult films in some of his theaters so that he could exhibit Che! (1969), a film that aroused anger from the Cuban exile community in Miami. Bomb threats and physical violence ensued. One protestor turned up at Griffith's theater brandishing a gun. It was all too much for Griffith, who opted to return to the "safer activity of exhibiting sex films."

Refusing to back down, Griffith attempted to show the film again months later. “Freedom of expression and the freedom to see what you chose to see is what they came over here for, isn't it?," he told The Miami Herald. "In America we have the right to see, hear and do what we like. Isn't that what this country is all about?”

====== Controversy over use of Madonna name ======
In 1994, Griffith converted the Roxy from an adult movie theater to an all-nude strip club (Club Madonna), which it remains today. Griffith successfully withstood an attempt by attorneys for the pop singer Madonna to prevent him from using the name. According to an April 1994 item in the Daily Mail —

"The singer, who wants to open a parade of strip clubs herself, had her lawyer fire off a letter to the club's owner, Leroy Griffith, telling him he would have to change the name of his establishment 'because it gives the impression that my client endorses your club and its activities.' An attorney for the club hit back saying: 'If Madonna wants to take down the sign, she'll have to stop by with a ladder and do it herself.'"

Newsweek reported that her lawyers claimed she had been "injured" by her perceived association with the club and that its name was "a serious violation of our client's rights" under U.S. trademark law. Griffith's attorney countered that Madonna is a name "that's been in the public domain for a couple of thousand years." Griffith declared to a local TV station, "Our name is Club Madonna, Incorporated, and it will be there as long as we're legally allowed to do so, and I think that'll be for a long, long time."

====== Stormy Daniels ======
Griffith – once a guest aboard Donald Trump's private helicopter long before Trump became president – hired Trump's one-time sex partner and adult film star Stormy Daniels for a two-night appearance at Club Madonna in 2018, during her “Make America Horny Again” tour. "I got her at the right price," Griffith told a local newspaper.

For a detailed table of Griffith's theaters and clubs, click here.

== Legal battles ==
As a producer of adult entertainment viewed by its opponents as obscene and risqué, Griffith frequently encountered the opposition of civic leaders, community activists, churches, and schools, among others. States and municipalities enacted restrictive laws and local ordinances. Police enforced them with raids, seizures, and arrests. Judges and courts often imposed civil and criminal sanctions — sometimes forcing format changes or outright closures of shows and theaters. These and other methods were used to try to thwart theater owners like Griffith, as well as the people and performers he and others like him employed.

From the beginning of his career, Griffith faced staunch opposition to his business efforts, whether as a burlesque producer, adult film theater operator, or strip club owner. Rather than capitulate to those who would curtail him or force him out of business, he often chose to wage lawsuits to stop them and assert his legal rights, inviting the criticism that he is litigious. His and others' legal victories emboldened the adult entertainment industry in the U.S. and contributed to the gradual erosion of legal and societal intolerance towards adult entertainment in the 20th and 21st centuries.

Police raids were a common risk of the trade for Griffith. One night, he and his dancers were arrested, only to return and open up the same night. Other times, reels of adult films – even film projectors – were confiscated.

Miami officials once revoked his business license, but Griffith, undeterred, popped into his box office briefly, only for police to enter and arrest him for operating a theater: "I would get in the police car. We were arrested 24 times, I think, in one night." He blamed his frequent skirmishes with local authorities on "politicians wanting their name in the papers. You have those problems in this business."

The friction between authorities and theater owners like Griffith, as one journalist observed, peaked during

"...a brief period mostly in the 1970s when mainstream and art house theaters began switching to a new type of entertainment: pornography. It was part of a nationwide boom in erotically focused movie theaters, as audiences became more accepting of and curious about sexual content, downtown cinemas looked for ways to compete with color TV and drivable suburban theaters, and a series of court rulings strengthened First Amendment protections and made prosecuting pornography under obscenity laws more difficult."

=== v. The City of Columbus (1961) ===
In January 1961, Griffith was fined $500 for exhibiting "an indecent, immoral or impure picture" when he showed B-Girl Rhapsody at his recently opened Parsons Follies theater in Columbus, Ohio. He said he was happy to be arrested because it would give him a chance to go to court and "demand the same rights as any other American."

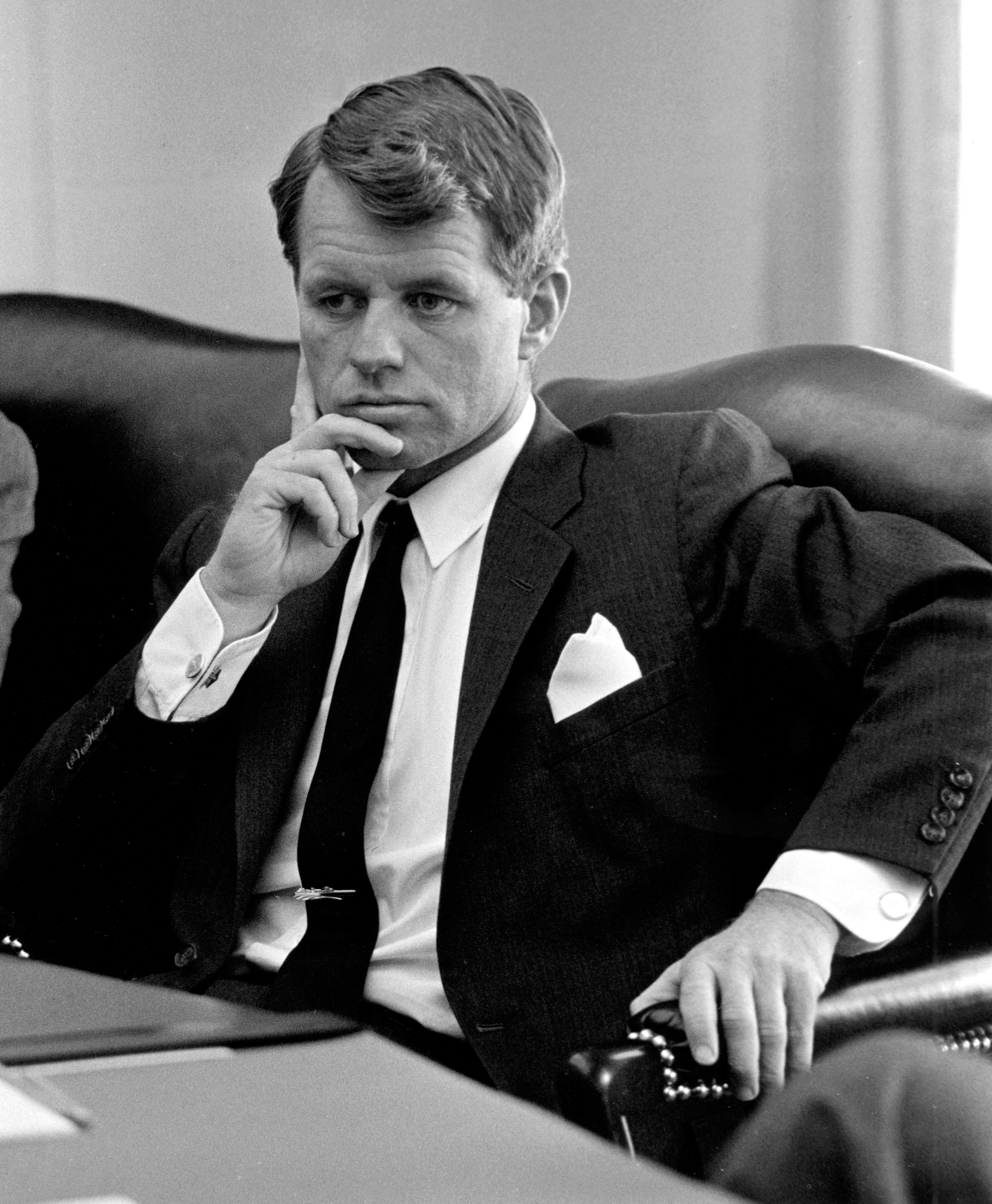
Griffith earned the scrutiny of U.S. Attorney General Robert F. Kennedy after he promoted his Gayety Burlesque Theater in the nation's capital with a sign that included the abbreviation "F.B.I.". Kennedy summoned Griffith to his Justice Department office, demanding an explanation. After Griffith explained that it stood for "Fine Burlesque Inside," Kennedy is said to have laughed.

His conviction, upheld in lower courts, was overturned in 1963 after the Ohio Supreme Court agreed to hear his appeal. The high court found the state's film censorship law unconstitutional. The Columbus Dispatch editorialized: "The most noteworthy factor that has come out of this battle is that violation of censorship laws in the movie field is something which is most difficult to define."

Later in 1961, a grand jury refused to indict Griffith on a charge of displaying "obscene, lewd or lascivious" pictures based on photos placed in the Parsons' lobby.

=== v. The City of Indianapolis (1962) ===
Griffith's Ritz Theater, in Indianapolis, Ind., began hosting burlesque performances in 1962 in addition to showing adult films. Outcry from neighborhood residents led to intense scrutiny from city officials and the local newspaper, resulting in the arrest of the show's star and Griffith on indecency charges and the confiscation of 15 film reels in a June 1962 raid. The city revoked the theater's license the next month.

=== Fear of Love controversy, Miami Beach (1970) ===
Fear of Love, Emile A. Harvard's avante-garde "educational" and "provocative comedy in two acts" with "graphic demonstrations of marriage behavior," was staged live at the Roxy in Miami Beach in 1970. Its cast members, male and female, performed nude.

The play, according to a synopsis of a previously produced film adaptation, was "an accurate presentation of married people having sexual difficulties and the unique, progressive approach in which a modern marriage counselor tries to solve them" and based "on actual cases."

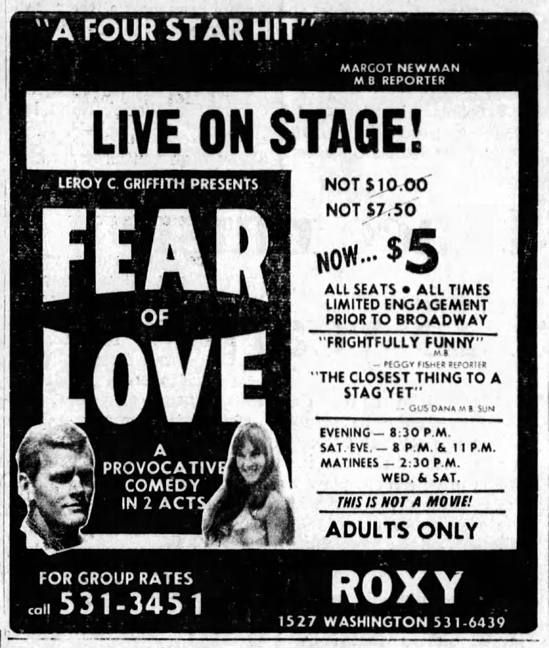
Newspaper ad for Fear of Love

Griffith told The Miami Herald's entertainment editor in a Sept. 10 column that he anticipated no legal harassment over his production, pointing to a California court ruling that "nothing in a play on the stage is obscene."

On Sept. 23, Mayor Jay Dermer called for a grand jury investigation of the Roxy for showing the play. He charged that it showed "live complete nudity, simulated sexual intercourse and homosexuality among females" and had "an extremely thin plot."

Though the city's vice squad officers and the chairman of Dermer's advisory committee to combat pornography branded the play pornographic, a municipal judge ruled that it was not obscene.

Griffith slammed the mayor's move as "just another way of harassment and getting his name in the paper." He told the Herald, "I suggest Mayor Dermer see a few of the plays around town, including 'Hair,' and stop watching the Saturday morning cartoons. This is 1970."

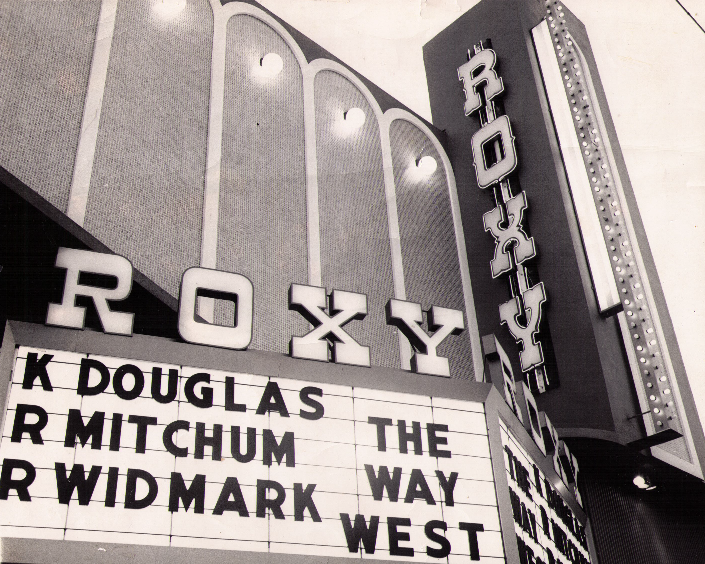
The Roxy

On Sept. 29, a grand jury indictment was unsealed; vice squad officers raided the Roxy that evening, arresting Griffith and his cast as they left the stage following a performance.

On the night of Oct. 5, six of the play's cast members were arrested for the second time in a week on charges of lewd and lascivious conduct. Griffith was charged with "operating a house of ill fame and presenting an obscene performance." An actor who was the only member of the cast who did not disrobe on stage was charged with participating in an obscene performance. Griffith complained to detectives, "People are being robbed out on the street and you guys are in here."

The next day, Griffith won a temporary restraining order from a local judge to keep the Roxy from being raided again. When the judge dissolved the order three weeks later, Griffith pulled the play from the Roxy's schedule.

=== v. Linda Lovelace (1974) ===
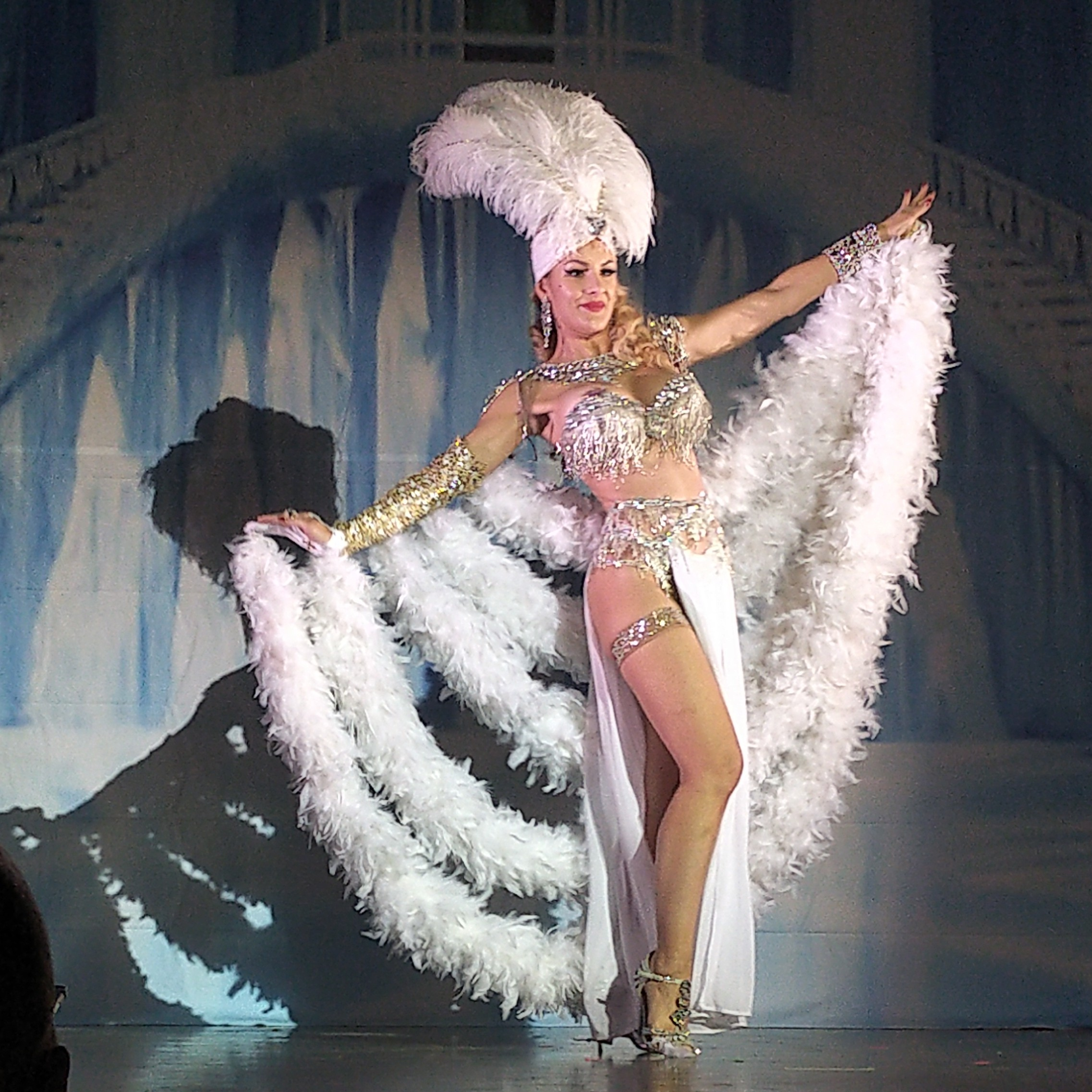
"If a judge in Washington, D.C., decides that the nekkid female torso isn't indecent, many showmen around the nation will follow the lawsuit brought by Hudson Burlesk producer Leroy Griffith." — Walter Winchell, in his July 31, 1966, nationally syndicated gossip column

In 1974, Griffith won a $32,038 judgment for damages against Linda Lovelace, who appeared in the 1972 hardcore film Deep Throat. He had hired her for $15,000 a week for four weeks to star in a live, Las Vegas-style stage revue at his Paramount Theater in Miami, slated for November 1973, but she failed to appear. The judge awarded Griffith just half of the amount he sought.

=== Illusions of a Lady, New Orleans (1976) ===
FBI agents seized Illusions of a Lady (1974) in a July 8, 1976, raid of Griffith's Sinerama Theater in New Orleans. The seizure was part of an effort to discourage interstate transportation of obscene materials into the city. A district court ruling later found that a federal magistrate issued the seizure warrant without probable cause; it was reversed, however, by a 1979 U.S. Court of Appeals decision.

"Continued police raids did take their toll on the New Orlean's porn industry," The Iron Lattice reported, "as did the rise of the VCR, which made it possible for people to view porn (or other movies) at home." By 1988, as a Times-Picayune columnist noted, the city's only remaining adult theater was Griffith's Cine Royale on Canal Street, which was protected by a restraining order as it challenged the constitutionality of state obscenity laws. It closed down in the 1990s.

=== v. Miami Mayor Maurice Ferré (1982) ===
Miami Mayor Maurice Ferré, bent on keeping "indecent" sex films off cable television in his city, sponsored a non-binding straw vote to ban them. Miami voters gave only a narrow 51 to 49 percent approval to his effort. Declaring "I don't know how to define it, but I know it when I see it," Ferré urged that a committee be named to decide what was obscene.

Griffith filed suit to stop the committee, whereupon Ferré abandoned his proposal. Thwarted in his bid to fight indecency, the mayor pledged to introduce a charter amendment on softcore pornography for Miami voters to decide, one which would specifically define what was indecent and leaving courts to determine which specific films met that definition.

=== v. The City of Hialeah, Fla. (1985) ===
Griffith turned Hialeah's Atlas Cinema into an X-rated theater in August 1985, outraging Mayor Raul Martinez. "The issue is not censorship," Martinez said at the time. "It is morality. They will bring in derelicts, the sick of mind. They're like herpes – wherever they go, everybody gets infected. We don't need that."

The day after opening, in a pre-emptive strike, Griffith's lawyers sued the city, charging that a Hialeah zoning ordinance banning porn cinemas within 500 feet of residences was unconstitutional. His court challenge failed and the theater was ordered shut down.

=== v. Dade County, Fla. (1987) ===
Between 1976 and 1987, the Pussycat was raided 18 times. Efforts by the county to charge him with a felony for screening two obscene movies within 5 years collapsed when Griffith's attorney pointed out that too much time had elapsed between incidents. When prosecutors then indicated they might like to charge him with a simple misdemeanor for the more recent indiscretion (showing the 1985 adult film American Babylon), his attorney argued it had been two years since that film had been confiscated, thus denying Griffith his right to a speedy trial. The judge agreed and threw out the case.

In April 1987, the Dade State Attorney's Office filed a ten-page complaint demanding that the Pussycat be shut down. This time the charge was brought under the Florida Racketeer Influenced and Corrupt Organization Act. Because the Pussycat had been raided 18 times in eleven years, prosecutors contended, it must be an ongoing criminal enterprise. "That's not what the RICO Act was put in for," Griffith retorted. A judge agreed and dismissed the complaint.

=== v. The City of Miami (1987) ===
In 1987, city officials confiscated movie projectors, a refreshment stand, and other property from Griffith's Pussycat Theater. He had just won a court fight with the city over his right to exhibit a film called Three Ripening Cherries. He was accused of owing more than $50,000 in fines dating back to 1978. The city bungled part of the collection process in a technical snafu, so Griffith ended up accountable for only $21,400.

An auction of his theater equipment was conducted to satisfy that debt. The winning bid came in at $13,500, from Griffith himself, effectively reducing his penalties by another $8,000.

=== v. The City of Hollywood, Fla. (1987) ===
Griffith's attorneys filed suit in November 1987 against Hollywood, Fla., asking a Broward County judge to declare the city's ordinances banning nude dancing unconstitutional. They asserted that the city's censorship was a violation of the First Amendment.

"If I was a judge taking bribes, a banker trying to swindle my customers out of bank funds, a doctor selling drugs, I might feel bad. But seeing a nude girl? There's nothing immoral about that. And there are more judges and lawyers and cops and bankers in jail than theater owners. I'm not hurting anyone, or stealing, or anything like that."

— Griffith, in a 1993 interview

The suit followed a series of incidents in 1985 in which police raided Griffith's Cine 1 & 2 Theater a dozen times, dismantling projectors and arresting employees on obscenity charges.

=== v. The City of Miami Beach (1989–2020s) ===
In late 1989, after the cities of Fort Lauderdale and North Miami Beach outlawed alcohol in establishments featuring nude entertainers, Miami Beach officials – led by Mayor Alex Daoud – feared strip club operators would gravitate to their city and that Miami Beach "would be overrun with sex-mad, drunken men and immoral, naked women."

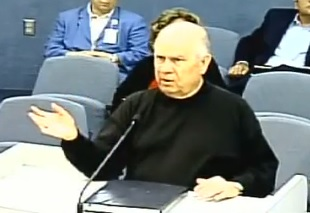
Confronting Miami Beach city commissioners in 2009 on the city's ban of alcohol in nightclubs featuring nudity.

The imminent debut of the Gold Club, whose owners had intended to introduce nudity and alcohol in their new building on 5th Street, spurred the City Commission to pass local legislation prohibiting such a mix.

Griffith announced that if the Gold Club was allowed to open with liquor and nudity, he would move his hard-core films from the Gayety Theater to the Roxy, which then was showing second-run movies for general audiences. In turn, he would convert the Gayety into an upscale nude bar to compete with the Gold Club.

Daoud said, "We don't have to sit idly by and watch [adult clubs] open up. It would be detrimental to the growth of our city that has been developing so nicely."

The city passed an ordinance in January 1990 prohibiting not only nudity and alcohol sharing the same room, but also banning any nudity near schools and churches. The Gold Club did open with nude dancers, but soon folded under the handicap of the no-liquor policy.

"There's nothing immoral about the human body. Evil's all in the mind."

— Griffith

Griffith, meanwhile, successfully changed the Gayety into an all-nude, alcohol-free strip club (Deja Vu) and turned the Roxy into another one (Club Madonna). Daoud was removed from office the following year after being implicated on unrelated corruption charges for which he was later convicted and imprisoned. Daoud said in 2012 that he supported the city's ordinance partly because of fears of a strip club deluge and also because he hoped to squeeze a $25,000 bribe out of the Gold Club's lobbyist, former mayor Harold Rosen. Griffith and Daoud later became close friends, remaining so until the latter's death in 2025.

From the early 2000s to the early 2020s, Griffith was involved in legal disputes with the City of Miami Beach over its 1989–1990 ordinances banning the sale of alcohol in any establishment featuring nudity. He sued several city officials in federal court, alleging they conspired to deny him a fair hearing before the City Commission after he sued the wife of one commissioner for libel, slander, and defamation after she waged a campaign against him, claiming, among other things, that he was a tax cheat.

== Film appearances ==
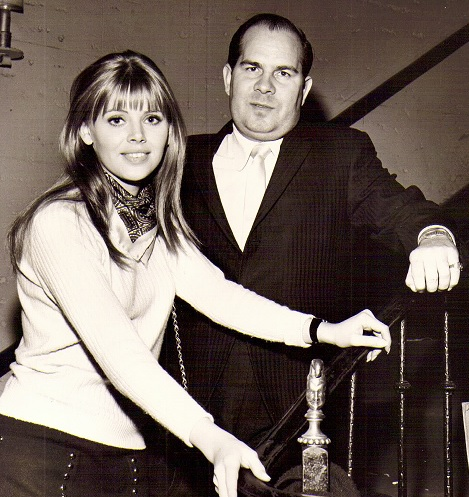
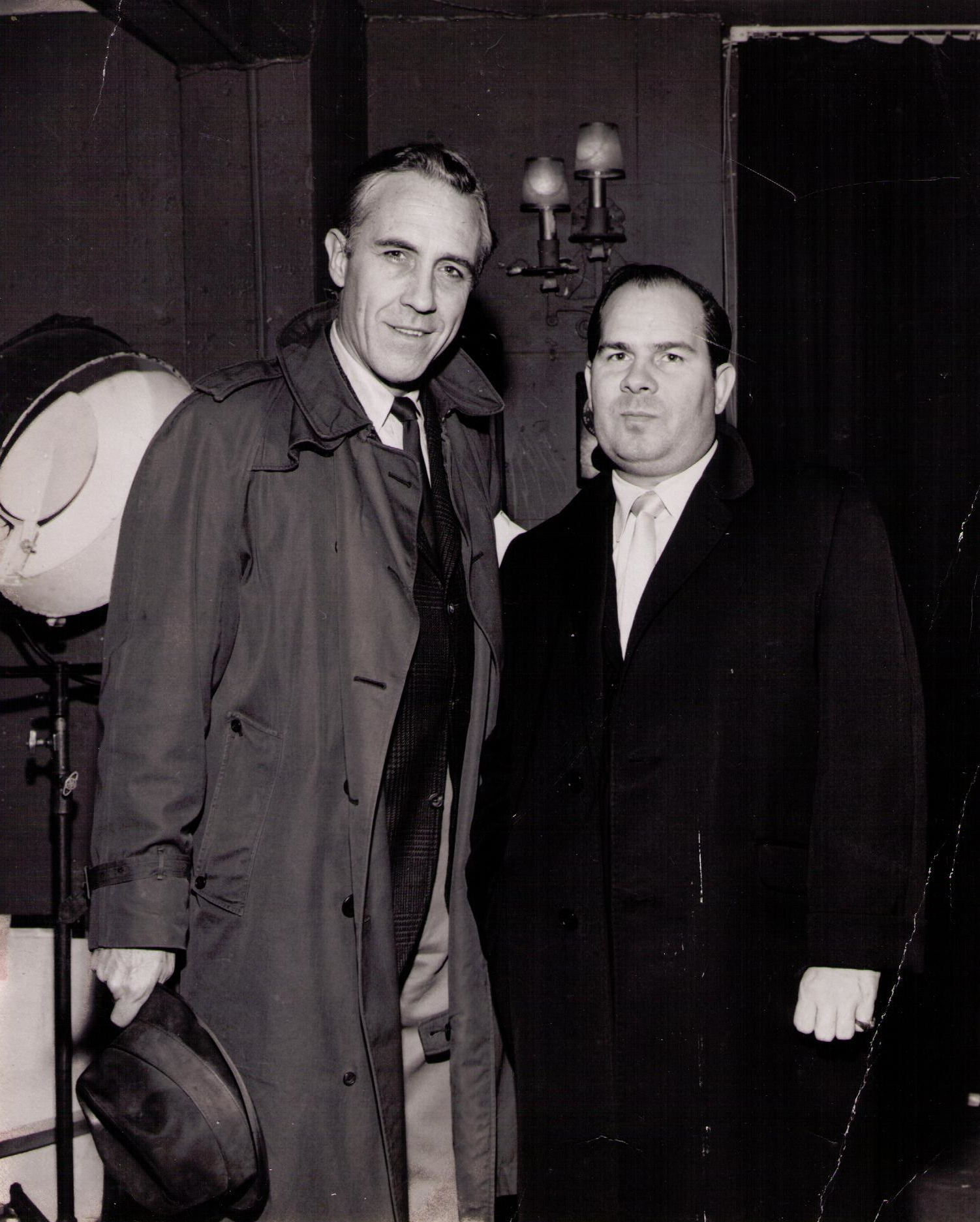
With actors Britt Ekland and Jason Robards, during the 1967 filming of The Night They Raided Minsky's at his Gayety Theater in New York City.

Griffith played brief cameo parts in some of his films.

His recollections of the burlesque era are included in Leslie Zemeckis's 2010 documentary, Behind the Burly Q.

His Miami Beach home on Pine Tree Drive was a filming location for scenes from the Frank Sinatra films Tony Rome (1967) and Lady in Cement (1968).

Interior theater sequences in Norman Lear's 1968 musical comedy film The Night They Raided Minsky's were shot in his Manhattan theater, the Gayety (now the Village East Cinema).

Scenes from the 1996 movie South Beach Academy were shot inside his Club Madonna in Miami Beach.

== Personal life ==
=== Family ===
Griffith married Linda Rivera in 1989. His children are from two previous marriages.

In May 1964, Griffith saved the life of his 18-month-old son, Cash, after pulling him unconscious from the family pool at their Venetian Islands home. He credited his effort to reading about mouth-to-mouth resuscitation instructions while on an airplane flight the week before.

Griffith's son Charles was convicted of first-degree murder and sentenced to life in prison after the 1985 mercy killing of his three-year-old daughter, who had been in a months-long coma in a Miami children's hospital following a freak accident. He was granted a retrial and, in 1995, took a deal to plead guilty to second-degree murder; he was released with credit for time served and good behavior. Charles Griffith later published an addiction recovery magazine and opened a sober house for women transitioning from substance rehab, both dedicated as memorials to his late daughter.

=== Philanthropy ===
Nationally syndicated Broadway gossip writer Earl Wilson thanked Griffith in a December 1965 "It Happened Last Night" column "for his welcome Christmas check for the 'Earl Wilson Help the Needy Fund' which arrived just in time to aid some deserving folk."

In October 1966, following New York City's 23rd Street Fire that claimed the lives of 12 firefighters, Griffith's Gayety Burlesque in the East Village in Manhattan devoted proceeds from a show to benefit the firefighters' widows and 32 children.

Griffith, for years, hosted annual shows at his Carib Theater benefiting the Miami Beach Police and Firemen's Benevolent Association. In 1969, Miami Beach police chief Rocky Pomerance was disturbed by the publicity from Griffith's $2,200 donation to the association. Pomerance asked the group to give it back on the premise that "simple ethical morality" demanded it, but he was rebuffed. The group used the donation to create a scholarship fund for children of police and firemen killed before retirement.

The city's police softball teams and the Miami Beach Policemen's Relief and Pension Fund have also been beneficiaries of Griffith's charitable giving. In 1997, the MBPD recognized Griffith for his donation of bicycles to the department, for use by its bike patrol officers.

=== Death ===
Griffith died at home in Miami on October 3, 2026, at the age of 94. He was survived by his wife, four children, and 3 grandchildren.

== Work ==
=== Broadway and off-Broadway stage productions ===
- Hello Burlesque (1965) – producer
- The Wonderful World of Burlesque (1965) – co-producer, director

=== Filmography ===
- Bell, Bare and Beautiful (1963) – producer, screenwriter, actor (Theater Manager)
- Lullaby of Bareland (1964) – producer
- The Case of the Stripping Wives (1966) – producer
- Mundo depravados (1967) – producer
- My Third Wife, George (1968) – producer
- Behind the Burly Q (documentary, 2010) – interview subject

== Awards and recognitions ==
- 1970s: Key to the City of Miami Beach (awarded by Mayor Harold Rosen)
- 1970s: Recognition for "unselfish contributions" to the annual All-Star show (Miami Beach Police and Firemen's Benevolent Association)
- 1997: Recognition for "outstanding dedication and service" to the Washington Avenue Bike Unit (Miami Beach Police Department)
- 1999: Recognition for "generous support" for the Miami Beach Police softball teams (Miami Beach Police Department)
- 2000: Recognition for "generosity and continued support" (Miami Beach Policemen's Relief and Pension Fund)
- 2007: Best Adult Club in Miami Beach (Club Madonna), The Miami SunPost

== List of Griffith's theaters and clubs ==
Theaters he owned and operated, was an ownership partner in, leased, and/or managed include these:

Note: Click the "sort" icon at the head of each column to view data in alphabetical order.

State	City	Name of theater	Other names known by	Summary
Florida	Fort Lauderdale	Adam and Eve		
Florida	Hialeah	Atlas Twin	Village	Formerly located at 1446 W. 49th Street.
Florida	Hollywood	Pussycat Cine Twin	Cine 1 & 2	Formerly located at 2315 N. State Road 7.
Florida	Jacksonville	Lake Shore		Formerly located at 4509 St. John Ave.
Florida	Jacksonville	Little	Harold K. Smith Playhouse	Located at 2032 San Marco Boulevard. Its landlord, Griffith said in a 1993 interview, "was the county sheriff" at the time.
Florida	Jacksonville	Roxy	Roxy Follies	Formerly located at 38 W. Forsyth St.
Florida	Jacksonville Beach	Beach	Beach Adult	Formerly located at the corner of First Street and Third Avenue North.
Florida	Key West	Monroe		Formerly located at 623 Duval Street.
Florida	Miami	79th Street Twin II Cinema	79th St. Art • Bard • Little River	Formerly located at 137 NE 79th Street.
Florida	Miami	Boulevard	At The Boulevard • Black Gold • Club Madonna II • Gold Rush Cabaret • Kitty Cat • Pussycat • Pussycat II • Shadows • Tomcat • Wonderland	Located at 7770 Biscayne Boulevard. Has variously served as a strip club, night club, and adult theater.
Florida	Miami	Dixie	Rio	Formerly located at 222 NE First Avenue in downtown Miami. Renamed the Rio in 1965.
Florida	Miami	Paramount	Fairfax	Formerly located at 257 East Flagler Street in downtown Miami.
Florida	Miami	Rex Art	King Art Cinema • Rosetta • Second Ave. Art	Located at 7929 NE Second Avenue. First opened as the Rosetta.
Florida	Miami	Town		Formerly located at 265 East Flagler Street.
Florida	Miami Beach	21st Street Adult	Fine Arts	Formerly located at 2039 Collins Avenue, at the corner of 21st Street.
Florida	Miami Beach	Beach		Formerly located at 420 Lincoln Road.
Florida	Miami Beach	Cameo		Located at 1445 Washington Avenue. It is a nightclub today.
Florida	Miami Beach	Carib		Formerly located at 230 Lincoln Road.
Florida	Miami Beach	Flamingo		Located at 320 Lincoln Road. Converted into a present-day nightclub.
Florida	Miami Beach	Gayety Burlesque	Deja Vu • Fine Arts • Miami Beach Playhouse • SoBe Showgirls	Formerly located at 2004 Collins Avenue.
Florida	Miami Beach	Paris	Paris Follies • Paris Moderne • Variety	Formerly located at 550 Washington Avenue. Griffith's first acquisition upon settling in South Florida in 1961. The Art Deco building's interior has been transformed into an upscale restaurant.
Florida	Miami Beach	Plaza Art		Formerly located at 1265 Washington Avenue.
Florida	Miami Beach	Roxy	Club Madonna	Located at 1527 Washington Avenue.
Florida	Orlando	Luv		Located at 355 N. Orange Avenue.
Florida	Tampa	Casino	Casino Follies	Located at 1536 7th Avenue in Tampa's Ybor City section. Closed in the 1970s, then was renovated and reopened c. 2000. It is home today to the Tampa Improv Comedy Club.
Florida	Tampa	Ritz	Masquerade • Rivoli	Located at 1503 E. 7th Avenue in Tampa's Ybor City section. Opened as the Rivoli; expanded in the 1930s as the Ritz and showed movies until 1982. Reopened in 2008 and is used for concerts and special events.
Florida	Warrington	Navy Point		Formerly located on Sunset Avenue. Opened after World War II for the entertainment of military families stationed in the Pensacola area.
Illinois	Chicago	Follies	Gem • London Dime Museum	Located at 450 S. State Street.
Illinois	Chicago	Rialto	State-Harrison • U.S. Music Hall	Formerly located at 546 S. State Street.
Indiana	Fort Wayne	Little	Capitol • Little Cinema	Formerly at Berry Street and Harrison Street.
Indiana	Indianapolis	Ritz	Middle Earth • Northside	Located at 3422 / 3430 N. Illinois Street. Considered one of the leading movie houses in the city. Burlesque took over in 1962. Known as the Northside from 1958 to 1970. Remodeled, it became a rock concert venue and resumed its former name, but closed in 1972.
Louisiana	New Orleans	Carrollton		Located at 4710 S. Carrollton Avenue. A classic Art Deco-style theater, it suffered water damage during Hurricane Katrina in 2005 but has since been refurbished as a banquet hall.
Louisiana	New Orleans	Cine Royale	Center • Wonderland	Located at 912 Canal Street. It became an adult theater after 1975.
Louisiana	New Orleans	Sinerama	Cinerama Adult • Martin Cinerama • Mike Todd's Cinerama • Pussycat • Trans-Lux Cinerama	Formerly located at 3615 Tulane Avenue. Under Griffith's management, it was known as the Pussycat and Sinerama.
Maryland	Baltimore	Gayety		Formerly located at 405 E. Baltimore Street.
Maryland	Baltimore	Paris		
Michigan	Detroit	Garden	Peek-A-Rama • Sassy Cat	Located at 3929 Woodward Avenue. A century after its opening, it was undergoing an estimated $14 million makeover.
Michigan	Detroit	National	Gayety • Palace	Located at 118 Monroe Street. Has fallen into disrepair.
Michigan	Flint	Michigan		Located at 1614 S. Saginaw Street.
Missouri	Kansas City	Folly	Century • Folly Burlesque • Shubert's Missouri • Standard	Located at 300 W. 12th Street. Following a renovation in the 1980s, it remains in use today. Was placed on the National Register of Historic Places in 1974.
Missouri	Kansas City	Strand		Located at 3544 Troost Avenue. Oldest still-operating theater in Kansas City. Began showing adult movies in the '70s.
New Jersey	Newark	Luxor	Luxor Follies	Formerly located at 264 Market Street.
New Jersey	Newark	Treat	Cameo Twin Cinema XXX	Located at 68 Orange Street.
New York	New York City	Gayety	Village East Cinema • 12th Street Cinemas • Casino East • Century • Eden • Entermedia • Louis N. Jaffe Art • Molly Picon's Yiddish Folk • Phoenix • Second Avenue • Stuyvesant • Yiddish Art	Located at 181 Second Avenue, in Manhattan. Theater sequences for the 1968 film The Night They Raided Minsky's were shot here.
New York	New York City	Hudson	Avon-on-the-Hudson • Hudson Burlesk • Savoy	Located at 141 W. 44th Street in midtown Manhattan. A former Broadway theater, now a conference center and special event venue. In 1954 it became home to the original version of The Tonight Show with host Steve Allen.
New York	New York City	Mayfair Burlesque	Billy Rose's Diamond Horseshoe	Located at 235 West 46th Street. It was a theater in the basement of the Paramount Hotel. From 1938 to 1951, theatrical impresario and song writer Billy Rose operated his Diamond Horseshoe nightclub there.
New York	New York City	Metropolitan	14th Street • Arrow • "The Met"	Formerly located at 241 East 14th Street.
New York	New York City	Shore	Loew's Coney Island	Located at 1301 Surf Avenue in Coney Island, Brooklyn.
New York	Syracuse	Civic	Adam and Eve • Civic Follies • Ritz • Syracuse • System • Top	Formerly located at 527 S. Salina Street.
North Carolina	Charlotte	Astor	Astor Art • Neighborhood	Located at 511 E. 36th Street. Called "The Carolina’s Most Unusual Theater" in newspaper ads in the '60s, it was restored in recent years and today (as the Neighborhood) features bands and musicians.
North Carolina	Charlotte	Climax I and II		
North Carolina	Charlotte	Ritz		Formerly located at 1201 Beatties Ford Road.
Ohio	Cincinnati	Gayety	Empress • Gayety Burlesk	A Vine Street theater that opened as the Empress and became the Gayety in 1922. Its demolition made way for a main library.
Ohio	Cincinnati	Imperial	Imperial Follies	Located at 282 McMicken Avenue. Presented adult films and later, in the '60s, live burlesque shows.
Ohio	Cleveland	University	Circus Maximus • PAT (Performing Arts Theater) • Scrump-Dee-Dump-Dee	Formerly located at 10606 Euclid Avenue.
Ohio	Columbus	Little Art	Olentangy • Piccadilly • World	Located at 2523 N. High Street, it opened in the silent picture era as The Piccadilly. An adult movie theater from the '50s to its demolition.
Ohio	Columbus	Livingston	Gayety	Located at 1567 East Livingston Avenue. As of late 2012, there were plans to renovate it.
Ohio	Columbus	Parsons	Parsons Follies	Located at 1293 S. Parsons Avenue.
Ohio	Geneva-on-the-Lake, Ohio	State	Lyceum	
Ohio	Steubenville	Ohio		Located on Market Street.
Ohio	Toledo	Gayety	Gayety Burlesk • Guild • Hollywood Burlesk • Strand	Located at 322 N. Summit Street.
Ohio	Toledo	Town Hall		Formerly located at Orange and St. Clair Streets. Griffith operated this with retired performer Rose La Rose.
Ohio	Youngstown	Strand		Formerly located in Central Square. Closed as a movie house in the 1950s, then reopened featuring live burlesque and adult movies.
Oregon	Portland	Capitol	Blue Mouse	Located at 626 SW 4th Street. Renamed the Blue Mouse in 1958. Famous stripper Tempest Storm co-owned and operated the Capitol in the 1950s.
Oregon	Portland	Star	Princess • Star Burlesk	Located at 13 NW 6th Avenue. Opened as the Princess, screening silent movies. Became the Star Burlesk in 1939, presenting burlesque shows. Refurbished, it remains in operation today.
Pennsylvania	Erie	Regent		Formerly located at 1019 Parade Street.
Pennsylvania	Philadelphia	Aardvark	Cayuga	Formerly located at 4371 Germantown Avenue. Opened as the Cayuga.
Pennsylvania	Philadelphia	Howard	Howard Follies	Located at 2614 N. Front Street. In the early '60s, it operated with an adults-only policy and advertised as the Howard Follies.
Pennsylvania	Philadelphia	Trocadero	The Troc • Arch Street Opera House • Park Theater	Located at 1003 Arch Street.
Pennsylvania	Pittsburgh	Cameraphone	Cameraphone Follies	Located at 6202 Penn Avenue.
Tennessee	Chattanooga	Capitol		Formerly located at 528 Market Street.
Washington	Seattle	Rivoli	Old Seattle • Tivoli	Formerly located at First Avenue and Madison Street. Opened as a burlesque theater featuring, among others, Sophie Tucker and Belle Baker. It later presented legit stage theater, then adult movies before its demolition.
Wisconsin	Superior	Tower	People's • Tower Arts	Formerly located at 1018 Tower Ave.
	Washington, D.C.	Central	Gayety • Gayety Burlesque • Imperial • Moore's Garden Theatre	Formerly located at 425–433 9th Street NW. Opened as The Imperial. Renamed Moore’s Garden Theatre in 1913. Renamed The Central in 1922. Renamed by Griffith as the Gayety Burlesque; presented live burlesque from the 1950s to its closing in the 1970s.
