= Ace Theatre =

- U.S. National Register of Historic Places
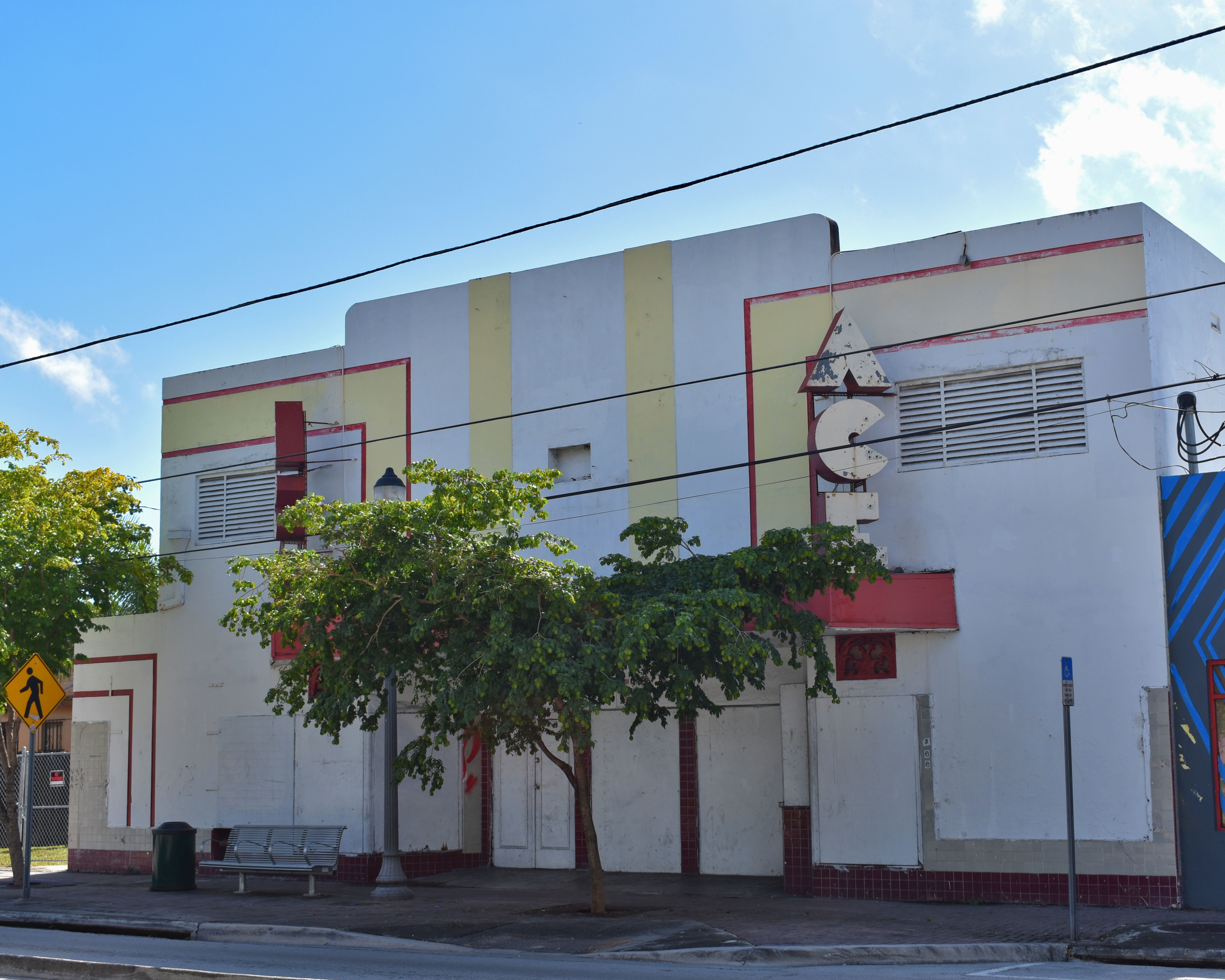
- Ace Theatre in 2018

- Location within Florida Location within the United States
- Location: 3664 Grand Avenue, Miami, Florida
- Coordinates: 25°43′39″N 80°15′08″W
- Area: less than one acre
- Built: 1930
- Architectural style: Art Deco
- NRHP reference No.: 16000359
- Added to NRHP: June 13, 2016

Ace Theatre in Miami, Florida, is an Art Deco commercial structure constructed in 1930 in Miami's Coconut Grove neighborhood. On July 1, 2014, the site was designated as a local historic resource. The building was added to the National Register of Historic Places June 13, 2016.

The Wolfson-Meyer Theater Company, later Wometco Enterprises, owned the theater since its construction in 1930 until 1979, when the building was purchased by Harvey Wallace. The Wallace family founded Ace Development Co., the theater's current owner.

In the 1950s, Ace Theatre was the only film venue to serve the black community in Coconut Grove.

== See also ==
- Boulevard Theater (Miami)
- Lyric Theater (Miami)
- Tower Theater (Miami, Florida)
