= Boulevard Theatre =

Boulevard Theatre or Boulevard Theater may refer to:

- Boulevard theatre (aesthetic), a theatrical aesthetic which emerged from the boulevards of Paris's old city
- Boulevard Theatre (Queens), a historic playhouse and movie theater in Queens, New York
- Boulevardteatern, the Boulevard Theatre in Södermalm, Stockholm
- Soho#Raymond_Revuebar, the upstairs of the Raymond Revuebar in Soho, London
- Boulevard Theater (Miami), a former movie theater, now nightclub, in Miami, Florida
