= Virginia Bell =

Virginia Bell may refer to:

- Virginia Bell (judge) (born 1951), Australian judge
- Virginia Bell (actress) (1934–2010), American topless actress
- Virginia Bell (baseball) (1927–1994), American baseball player
- Virginia Surtees (née Bell, 1917–2017), British art historian and author
