= Roxy Theater (Miami Beach) =

Movie theatre in Miami Beach, Florida, U.S.

Coordinates: 25°47′17.4″N 80°07′54″W

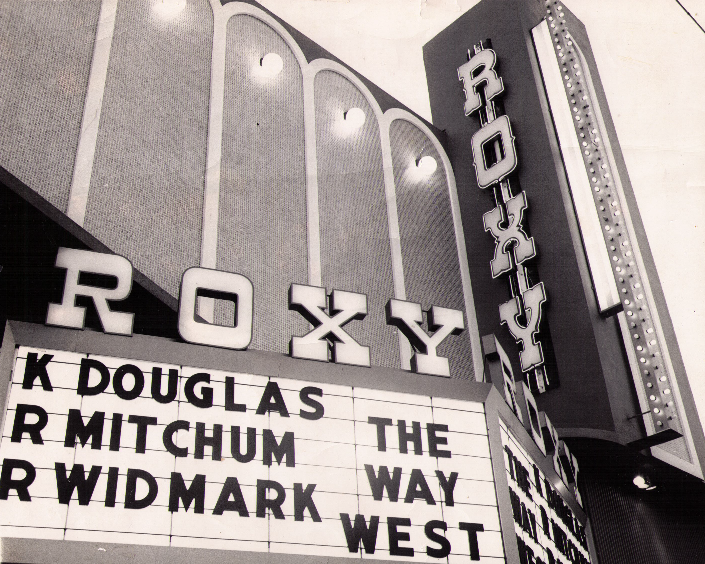
- The Roxy Theater, at its 1967 grand opening.
- Interactive map of Roxy Theater
- Address: 1527 Washington Avenue; Miami Beach, Florida; United States
- Owner: Leroy Griffith
- Operator: Leroy Griffith
- Capacity: 725
- Current use: Club Madonna (adult nightclub)

Construction
- Built: 1948; 78 years ago
- Opened: July 21, 1967; 59 years ago
- Renovated: 1994
- Reopened: March 17, 1994; 32 years ago (as Club Madonna)
- Years active: 1967-present

The Roxy Theater is a former movie theater located at 1527 Washington Avenue in Miami Beach, Florida. In 1994, the Roxy was converted into an adult nightclub and renamed Club Madonna. It was owned and operated by theater and nightclub proprietor and former Broadway theater producer Leroy Griffith.

== History ==
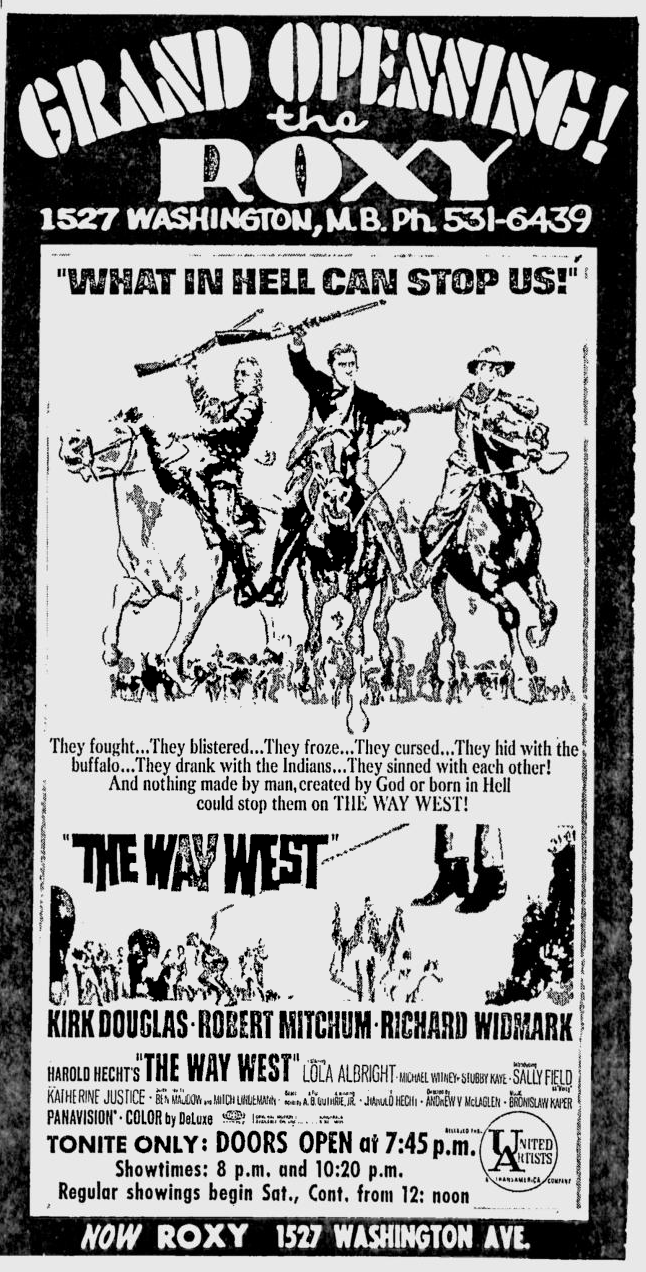
This July 21, 1967 newspaper ad promoted the grand opening of the Roxy.

The Roxy, billed as "Miami Beach's newest and most fabulous theatre," opened on Friday, July 21, 1967. For its grand opening, the theater premiered The Way West, starring Kirk Douglas, Robert Mitchum, and Richard Widmark.

"The theater is luxurious, designed for comfort and seats 400," wrote Miami News columnist Herb Kelly. He also reported that Griffith planned to add vaudeville later.

Griffith generated publicity there when, in 1967, he publicly invited city officials to a screening of the film, Man and Wife. "It was advertised as the art of making love 49 different ways," he said in a 1993 interview. "I don't remember inviting them, but I vaguely remember the incident. I think that was the first hard-core movie ever shown down here." According to press accounts at the time, the officials seemed to think the movie was boring, but not obscene.

In early 1994, Griffith converted the Roxy from an adult movie theater to an all-nude strip club (Club Madonna), which it remains today. He successfully withstood an attempt by attorneys for the pop singer Madonna to prevent him from using the name. According to an April 1994 item in the Daily Mail,

"The singer, who wants to open a parade of strip clubs herself, had her lawyer fire off a letter to the club's owner, Leroy Griffith, telling him he would have to change the name of his establishment 'because it gives the impression that my client endorses your club and its activities.' An attorney for the club hit back saying: 'If Madonna wants to take down the sign, she'll have to stop by with a ladder and do it herself.'"

Newsweek reported that her lawyers claimed she had been "injured" by her perceived association with the club and that its name was "a serious violation of our client's rights" under U.S. trademark law. Griffith's attorney countered that Madonna is a name "that's been in the public domain for a couple of thousand years." Griffith declared to a local TV station, "Our name is Club Madonna, Incorporated, and it will be there as long as we're legally allowed to do so, and I think that'll be for a long, long time."

Scenes from the 1995 movie South Beach Academy were shot inside Club Madonna.

Donald Trump's one-time sex partner and adult film star Stormy Daniels was featured in a two-night appearance at the club in 2018, during her “Make America Horny Again” tour. "I got her at the right price," Griffith told a local newspaper.
