= Bernie Barker =

American dancer

Bernie Barker (July 31, 1940 – March 21, 2007) was recognized in July 2003 by Guinness World Records as the world's oldest male stripper. The former nuclear power plant worker and insurance salesman had taken up erotic dancing in 2000 at the age of 60 to keep in shape after surgery for the prostate cancer that would eventually cause his death. Over his stripping career, Barker titled in 42 stripper contests. He appeared on the first season of America's Got Talent in 2006.

Barker's quest to place in Guinness began in 1978 with an unsuccessful bid to claim a record in swimming. He died after finally losing his battle with prostate cancer on March 21, 2007.

== External links and sources ==
- Oldest Male Stripper Guinness World Records. Accessed August 19, 2007.
- The World's Oldest Male Stripper NPR July 2, 2003. Accessed August 19, 2007.
- John Katsilometes finds the world's oldest stripper, Bernie Barker, 66, who is uncovered at Chippendales Las Vegas Sun. October 5, 2006. Accessed August 19, 2007.
- NORM: Barker lived on his own terms Las-Vegas Review Journal. April 7, 2007. Accessed August 19, 2007.
