= April March (dancer) =

American dancer (1935–2025)

- Born: Velma Fern Worden; June 18, 1935; Oklahoma City, Oklahoma, U.S.
- Died: September 15, 2025 (aged 90); Wilton, New York, U.S.
- Other names: First Lady of Burlesque
- Occupation: Burlesque performer
- Years active: 1952–1978
- Parents: Clarence "Buddy" Worden (father); Fern Gragg (mother)

Velma Fern Worden (June 18, 1935 – September 15, 2025), better known by the stage name April March, was an American exotic dancer and prominent star of burlesque. Billed as April March, The First Lady of Burlesque, she was a headline act in burlesque from 1952 to 1978. During her more than thirty-year career, she gained popularity throughout the United States, Canada, Mexico and Europe for her classy and sophisticated striptease. March was one of the innovators of the elegant strip tease.

== Early life ==
April March was born Velma Fern Worden in Oklahoma City, Oklahoma. She was the only child of Clarence "Buddy" Worden and Fern Gragg. After her parents divorced her mother went through a string of marriages and alcoholism and her father was absent for most of her life. March was left to be raised by her grandparents Elmer and Ida Gragg.

March began dance, skating and acrobatic lessons at an early age and aspired to be a movie actress. At the age of ten, she was cast as an extra in an Our Gang comedy that was being filmed in Oklahoma City.

March was married to her first husband at the age of fifteen. The marriage lasted less than two years. At age seventeen, divorced and in need of money to get herself to Hollywood, she lied about her age to get a job as a cigarette girl at an Oklahoma City nightclub, The Derby Club. It was while working there that she was discovered by Barney Weinstein, a renowned Dallas club owner, who offered her a chance to be in burlesque.

== Burlesque career ==
April March began her career in 1952 at The Theater Lounge in Dallas, TX. After meeting Barney Weinstein in Oklahoma and being offered the opportunity to work in his club, she traveled to Dallas. Weinstein had her trained as a burlesque stripper and gave her the name April March. At the same time, Weinstein and his brother, Abe, were training another burlesque legend, Candy Barr. March became an instant favorite with audiences who were intrigued by the mix of sensuality and innocence from the raven haired beauty and taken in by her warmth and charm.

By the time she was eighteen years old, April March was touring, playing clubs and theaters across the United States, Canada and Mexico. While touring the club and theater circuits, March refined her act, playing on her image of the sophisticated debutante type and became known for her elegant, well choreographed striptease that put the emphasis on teasing.

March inspired two original songs written specifically for her, "Blues for April" and "Springtime for April" which became popular numbers in her act.

Throughout her career, April March worked with other burlesque legends such as Lili St. Cyr, Blaze Starr, Rose La Rose and Ann Corio as well as famous burlesque comics such as Billy "Cheese and Crackers" Hagen, Lenny Ross and Jimmy Matthews.

In 1961, April March was given the title "The First Lady of Burlesque". When an agent pointed out March's striking resemblance to then First Lady of the United States, Jacqueline Kennedy, the agent jokingly said that March's new moniker could be "The First Lady of Burlesque". March's ladylike demeanor on stage also played a part in the title and she began using it.

While appearing at the Picadilly Club in Miami, FL., March was invited to attend a luncheon by Prince Thamur and Prince Mansour of Saudi Arabia who were accompanying their father, King Saud, on a trip to the United States. King Saud heard of March from his two sons and requested a private audience with her. This invitation led to a request by the U. S. State Department for March to secretly deliver a letter to King Saud. March agreed to deliver the letter. March was asked by King Saud to accompany him to Majorca, Spain and then back to Saudi Arabia. On the advice of the United States Government, March turned down the offer, fearing for her life.

Shortly after her meeting with the Saudi King, April March was involved in a fatal shoot out in another Miami club, The Place Pigalle. After a dispute over a bill on which he was charged for March's drinks while she sat at his table, a drunken customer began shooting randomly through the club. When the shooting was over, a singer had been murdered, a doorman was wounded in both legs and one of the dancers had been wounded in one leg which was eventually amputated. The shooter held a gun to April March's head and was overpowered just before pulling the trigger. True Detective magazine picked up the story, labeling March a Femme Fatale who had been the cause of the shootout.

Later in her career, March starred in two shows with the Minsky Theaters in New York City and Wildwood, New Jersey. She turned down Harold Minsky's offer to star in his Las Vegas theater in favor of a three-month contract as the star of the Arthur Fox Review Bar in Manchester, England. March was a special guest star in Ann Corio's off-Broadway show, This Was Burlesque and was filmed for a late night television special entitled The Secrets of April March. She also went head to head in a television interview with Dorothy Fuldheim and appeared as a guest on the Joe Franklin Show. March was also a frequent headliner on the B&E Theater Circuit, a chain of burlesque theaters across the U.S. and Canada owned and operated by Frank Bryan and Frank Engels. She appeared as the stripper in the 1961 Jim Henson short film, Time Piece, which may be the only existing footage of her performing.

At various points in her career, April March received offers to appear on Broadway in the legitimate theater and was twice offered contracts with Columbia and United Artists studios. She turned down each offer in favor of her burlesque career. March also turned an offer to pose in Playboy Magazine, for a fee in excess of ten thousand dollars, citing the fact that she would never appear fully nude in public.

== Retirement ==
April March retired from burlesque in 1978 citing that the business had changed and become too blatant and sexual. After retiring, her only public appearance in thirty years would be in 1982 when she became the third woman ever (after Ann Corio and Elizabeth Taylor) to be honored as Person of the Year by The Circus Saints and Sinners Organization.

In 2006, April March was invited to appear as one of the Legends of Burlesque at the annual Miss Exotic World in Las Vegas. After seeing the new burlesque revival and the acts dedicated to the classic strip tease, March was impressed and once again became part of burlesque doing annual appearances, lectures and teaching at festivals in Las Vegas, Boston and Canada. Although she no longer did a strip tease, she became a teacher in the old style of the elegant strip tease act.

April March was one of the performers featured in the 2010 Leslie Zemekis film, Behind the Burly Q and in the Immodesty Blaize film, Burlesque Undressed.

April March later resided in upstate New York with her eighth husband and continued to make frequent appearances across the United States and Canada, passing on her knowledge and skill to new and upcoming burlesque stars.

== Personal life and death ==
April March was married eight times. Her first husband was inventor Benjamin Joseph Mitson born in North Idaho. They were only married for a year. She was romantically involved with an infamous Mafia boss in Chicago, Oklahoma oil tycoon, Keene Burwell, numerous entertainers such as actors Dale Robertson, Ray Shaw, Charles Braswell and Monty Hale, baseball legend, Joe DiMaggio and singers Hank Thompson and Mel Torme. March was also briefly involved with former Chairman of the U.S. House Ways and Means Committee, Wilbur Mills. In order to get rid of Mills, whom she said she could not stand, March introduced Mills to a friend and fellow stripper, Fanne Foxe.

For a brief time, March was engaged to singer, Mel Torme, who was to be her fourth husband. She jilted Torme to marry a man who owned a string of drugstores. Although Torme was furious, the two eventually renewed a friendship that lasted until Torme's death. During this fourth marriage, March took a six-year hiatus from burlesque, during which she discovered a second love, golf. She served as President of the Ladies Golf Association in Tulsa, Oklahoma and developed an eight handicap. This accomplishment would later have her become the only burlesque stripper to be written up in Sports Illustrated in the June 1964 issue.

March died in Wilton, New York, on September 15, 2025, at the age of 90. She had one child, a daughter from her third marriage, and one grandchild.
