= Leslie Zemeckis =

Actress, writer, director

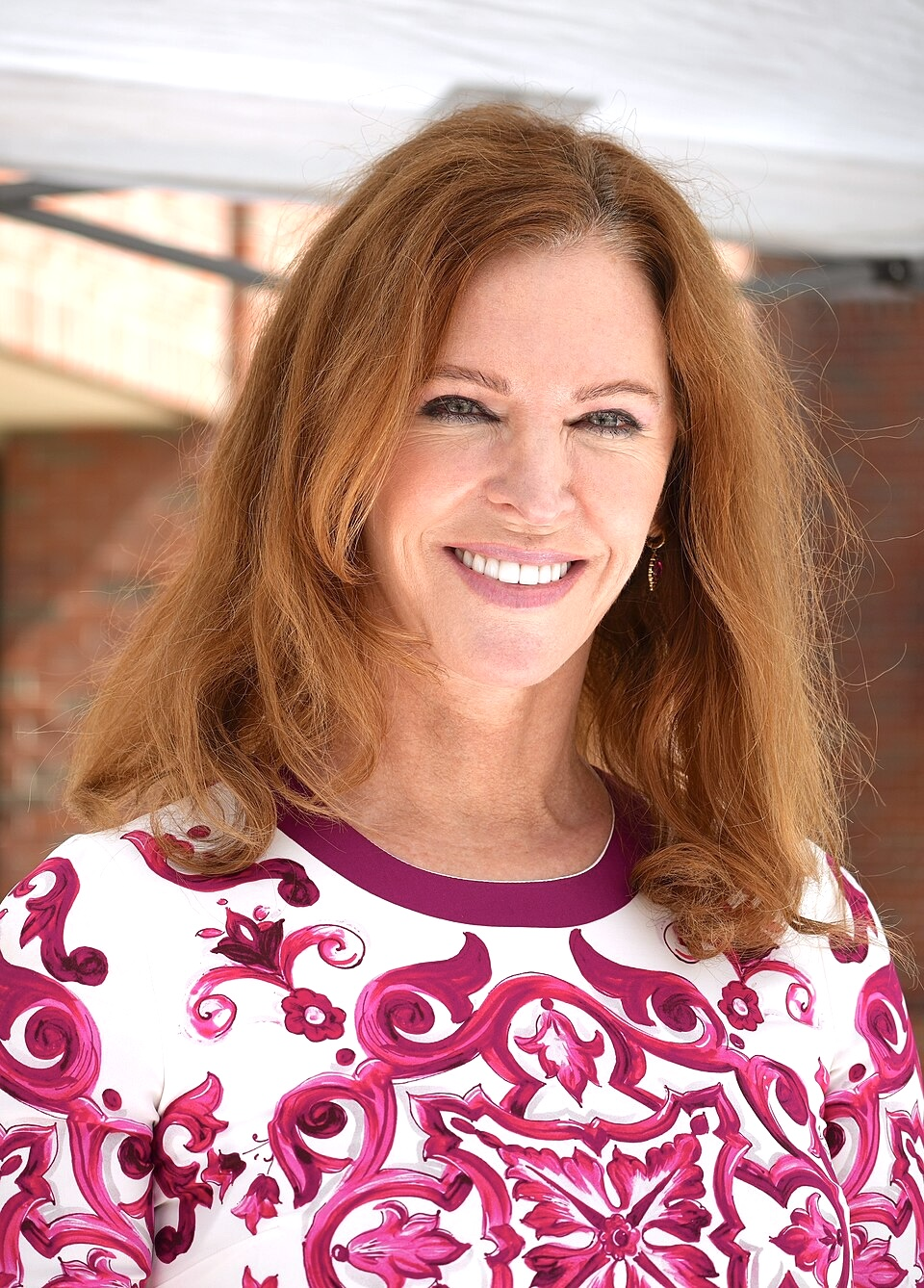
- Zemeckis at the 2025 San Diego Writers Festival
- Born: Leslie Harter; February 5, 1969 (age 57)
- Occupations: Writer; film director; actress; producer
- Years active: 1984–present
- Spouse: Robert Zemeckis (m. 2001)
- Children: 3
- Website: lesliezemeckis.com

Leslie Zemeckis (born February 5, 1969) is an American author, documentary filmmaker and actress. She has directed four documentary films including Behind the Burly Q, Bound by Flesh, Mabel Mabel Tiger Trainer, and Grandes Horizontales. She has also written three non-fiction books. Her work focuses on women involved in burlesque, strippers, and the circus. She is married to filmmaker Robert Zemeckis.

She also created and starred in her own burlesque show called "Staar: She'd Rather Be A Mistress", which she adapted into a short mockumentary "Staar: She’s Back and Mistresser Than Ever!” with Carrie Fisher and Fabio.

She has a monthly book column in the Montecito Journal.

== Career ==
Behind the Burly Q was first begun as a documentary that Zemeckis later adapted into a book.

For Burly Q, Zemeckis went across the country to interview men and women from burlesque shows of the past for her book and documentary. This included gathering over 50 people to interview at the Stardust Hotel in Las Vegas before it was demolished.

Zemeckis has written several articles about burlesque and has participated in burlesque shows, including a clothed reading of her book Goddess of Love Incarnate: The Life of Stripteuse Lili St. Cyr accompanied by naked women. She has also performed as her burlesque alter-ego Staar with the Santa Barbara Symphony.

Zemeckis' most recent documentary, Grandes Horizontales, concerns the lives of French courtesans navigating upper-class society in the 19th century.

== Awards ==
In 2023, she was awarded the Ellis Island Medal of Honor.

== Books ==
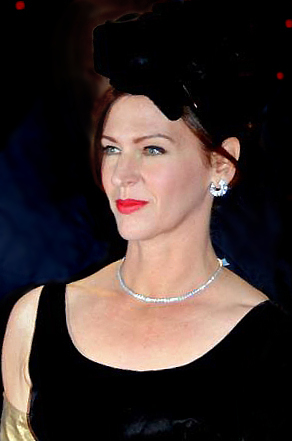
Zemeckis in 2013

- Behind the Burly Q (2013)
- Goddess of Love Incarnate: The Life of Stripteuse Lili St. Cyr (2015)
- Feuding Fan Dancers: Faith Bacon, Sally Rand, and the Golden Age of the Showgirl (2018)

== Filmography ==
=== As director ===
- Behind the Burly Q (2010)
- Bound by Flesh (2012)
- Mabel Mabel Tiger Trainor (2018)
- Grandes Horizontales (2022)

=== As actress ===
- 1992: Silk Stalkings (TV series): Cynthia Ashmore
- 1993: Beverly Hills, 90210 (TV series): Party Girl
- 1993: Ground Zero: Texas (video game): DiSalvo
- 1994: Jailbait: Roman's Girlfriend
- 1996: Damien's Seed: Jane Janzen
- 1996: Encounters: Diane
- 1997: Women: Stories of Passion (TV series): Emily
- 1998: Beverly Hills Bordello (TV series): Melissa / Amanda
- 1998: Confessions of a Call Girl: Reese
- 1998: I Married a Monster (TV movie): Bridesmaid #2
- 1998: Intimate Sessions (TV series)
- 1998: Life of a Gigolo: Rhonda
- 1998: Sex Files: Pleasure World: Sara
- 1998: Sex Files: Restless Souls: Heather
- 1998: The Sexperiment: Audrey / Marcie
- 1999: Caroline in the City (TV series): Kelly
- 1999: Dark Nova: Nova
- 1999: Deterrence: Sylvia Charles
- 2000: Blowback: Sandra Carlow
- 2000: Sacrifice (TV movie): Officer Mercedes Calderon
- 2000: Spiders: Emma
- 2004: The Polar Express: Sarah / Mother
- 2005: Terrible Children: Finnie
- 2007: Beowulf: Yrsa
- 2008: Prego (short film): Lisa
- 2009: A Christmas Carol: Fred's wife
- 2018: Welcome to Marwen: Suzette
- 2019: From Zero to I Love You: Pamela Finley-Logsdon
- 2024: Here: Elizabeth Franklin
