= Jean Mode =

American burlesque performer (born 1922)

- Born: 1922
- Occupations: Burlesque performer, erotic dancer
- Known for: Nightclub and burlesque performances in the United States

Jean Mode (born 1922) is an American former burlesque star and erotic dancer.

== Night club dancer ==
In August 1942 Mode was part of a 10 hitliner, 2:30 a.m. bill, at Leon and Eddie's night club at 33 West 52nd Street. Other entertainers featured were Johnny Morgan, Wacky Wayne, Leo Fuld, and Cesar and Rosita. The cafe owners were Leon Enken and Eddie Davis. Mode was in a cast of performers at the same 52nd Street establishment, in February 1944. A new Ruth Lane revue and former lightweight champion Tony Canzoneri were also there. In June 1945 she was again at Leon and Eddie's. Mode took an ice cold shower prior to each performance to give her skin a pinky glow. She made a return to striptease in April 1952 under the management of Miles Ingalls.

Mode was among the cast of the carnival comedy, Bigger Than Barnum (1946), staged by Fred Rath and Lee Sands. The show opened in Boston and closed in a short time, in the spring of 1946. Patricia Neal was one of the production's performers.

== Suicide attempt ==
Mode attempted suicide in her Beekman Tower Hotel apartment, 3 Mitchell Place, New York City, on December 30, 1952. She swallowed an overdose of sleeping pills. The hotel manager knocked on her door around 3:15 a.m., after the switchboard light indicated that the telephone in her room was off the hook. He called the police when he found Mode on the bathroom floor. An emergency squad policeman worked on her for an hour and twenty minutes before she was revived sufficiently to be taken to Metropolitan Hospital. Her condition was listed as serious. She was 30 years old.
