= Behind the Burly Q =

- Directed by: Leslie Zemeckis
- Written by: Leslie Zemeckis
- Produced by: Leslie Zemeckis; Sheri Hellard; Robert Zemeckis
- Cinematography: Sheri Hellard
- Edited by: Evan Finn
- Music by: Phil Marshall
- Production companies: Mistress, Inc.
- Distributed by: First Run Features
- Release date: April 23, 2010
- Running time: 98 minutes
- Country: United States
- Language: English
- Box office: $23,889

Behind the Burly Q is a 2010 film documentary examining the golden age of American burlesque in the first half of the 20th century.

== Synopsis ==
This documentary film, directed by Leslie Zemeckis, explores the heyday of burlesque includes dozens of interviews with exotic dancers of the time, including April March, Lorraine Lee, Taffy O’Neill, Blaze Starr, Tempest Storm, Beverly Arlynne, Kitty West, Alexandra the Great '48, and many others; Mike Iannucci, burlesque performer Ann Corio's husband and producer of “This Was Burlesque”; theater owner and burlesque producer Leroy Griffith; journalists and authors Nat Bodian, Rachel Schteir, and Janet Davis; and actor Alan Alda, whose father Robert Alda was a burlesque singer and straight man. The film discusses the rise and eventual fall of the golden era of burlesque, featuring profiles on several famous performers, including Sherry Britton, Sally Rand, Lili St. Cyr, Rose La Rose, and Gypsy Rose Lee.

== Reception ==
Film review aggregator Rotten Tomatoes reports that 77% of critics gave the film a positive review, based on 26 reviews, with an average score of 6.5/10. Emily Hourican of the Irish Independent lauded the film as "an absorbing, moving and cleverly constructed look at the tradition of American burlesque." Roger Ebert of the Chicago Sun-Times was less enthusiastic, claiming the film "settles too easily for an editing formula which alternates talking heads, too cursory performance footage and montages of headlines and photographs." Ronnie Scheib of Variety said the film's "stories run from raunchy to touching to funny to flat-out incredible.”

== Book ==
In 2013, Skyhorse Publishing released a companion book by Zemeckis, also called Behind the Burly Q.
