= Boulevard Theater (Miami) =

Former movie theater in Miami, now an adult entertainment club

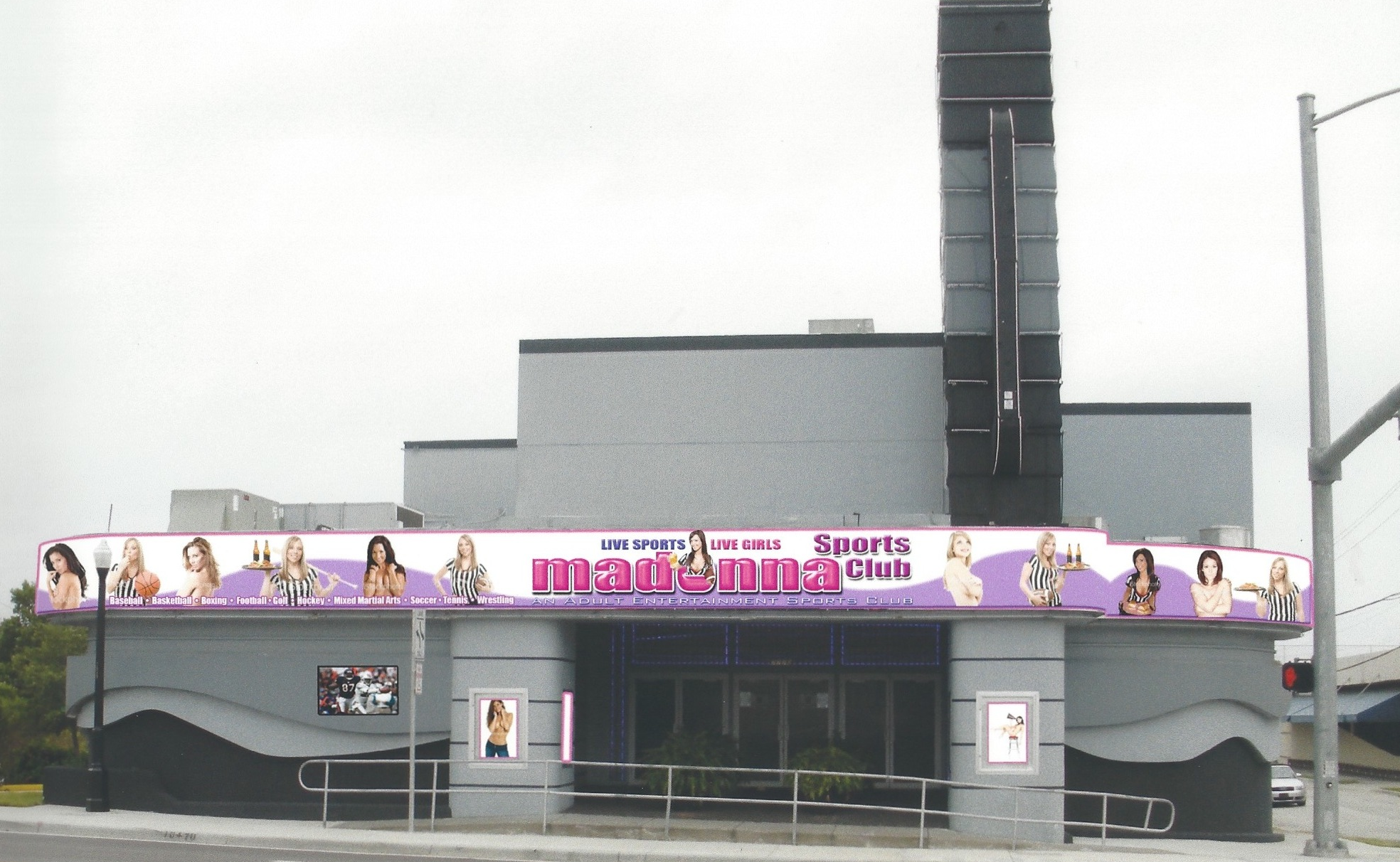
- Interactive map of Boulevard Theater
- Address: 7770 Biscayne Boulevard; Miami, Florida; United States
- Coordinates: 25°50′49.0″N 80°11′05.8″W
- Owner: Leroy Griffith
- Operator: Paramount Enterprises, Inc. (1940s)
- Capacity: 974
- Current use: Gold Rush Cabaret (adult nightclub)

Construction
- Opened: November 21, 1940; 85 years ago
- Years active: 1940-present
- Architects: Weed & Reeder

Website
- goldrushcabaret.com

The Boulevard Theater is a former movie theater located at 7770 Biscayne Boulevard in Miami, Florida. It was owned by theater and nightclub proprietor and former Broadway theater producer Leroy Griffith.

The theater has variously served as a night club and adult movie theater. It is currently an adult entertainment club, Gold Rush Cabaret.

== History ==
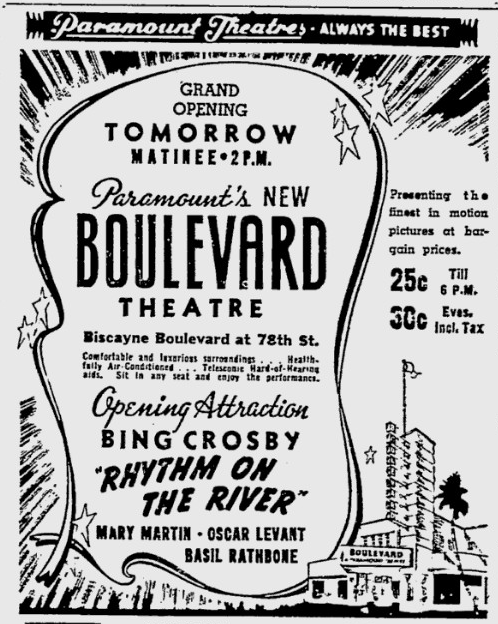
This Nov. 20, 1940 ad promoted the grand opening of a "healthfully air-conditioned" theater with "comfortable and luxurious surroundings."

The Boulevard's doors first opened on Thanksgiving Day, Thursday, November 21, 1940. Hailed as "the finest neighborhood theater in the South," the Boulevard featured modern amenities unique to the period, including a massive air conditioning system, acoustical walls, and neon lighting.

The theater, part of the Paramount Theatres chain, debuted with a matinee showing of Rhythm on the River, starring Bing Crosby and Mary Martin.

Purchased by Griffith for $165,000 in 1970 and renamed the Pussycat, he created three different theaters within: the Pussycat, the center theater, was a 900-seat theater that showed adult films including Deep Throat; the Kitty Cat featured female performers; and the Tomcat featured male performers.

Over the decades, the theater has also been known variously as Black Gold, Club Madonna II, Pussycat II, Shadows, and Wonderland.

Community activists have tried, and failed, to shut down the theater during its time as an adult club.
