= Virginia Bell (actress) =

American actress and burlesque dancer (1934–2010)

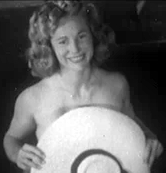
A still from a nudie loop.

Virginia Bell (August 14, 1934 – July 1, 2010) was a model and actress.

== Career ==
Two Bells for Virginia

Bell began her career in burlesque at age 22. By the 1950s, Bell began posing for men's magazines. She had one starring role in a feature film, Bell, Bare and Beautiful (1963), which was the product of legendary sexploitation team of Herschell Gordon Lewis and David Friedman. It was made to fulfill a request by her husband, Eli Jackson. In it, she plays a burlesque dancer pursued by Lewis regular William Kerwin (credited as Thomas Wood). But his attempts at finding true love with the "girl of his dreams" are thwarted by her gangster boyfriend (played by David Friedman). Wood gets around this speedbump by tracking Virginia down at the nudist camp she frequents, which is where at least half the film takes place. Bell made another appearance in Lullaby of Bareland (1964), a series of three shorter segments spliced together to flesh out the runtime. Virginia's contribution is a lengthy striptease routine.
