= Miss Mona Superhero =

American artist (born 1970)

- Born: 1970 (age 54–55); Abilene, Texas, U.S.
- Occupation: Visual Artist
- Years active: 2003–present

Miss Mona Superhero, real name unknown, is an American artist, activist, and Northwestern United States personality.

The Oregonian has called her a “cult figure in Portland's cabaret-performance world during the 90s”, “subterranean art star”, and “master of the tape-and-cut form.” In the 1990s, she co-founded the influential Danzine periodical and support network for sex workers.

She's worked since the 2000s as a visual artist specializing in dayglo portraits pasted together from industrial adhesive tape. She has been described as “perhaps the nation’s premier duct-tape artist.” As “staff artist” for Voodoo Doughnut, she creates an enormous mural for each franchise.

== Danzine ==
The woman who became Miss Mona was born in Abilene, TX in 1970. Aged 12, she moved to Austin and lived for some time in Richmond, VA and Butte, MT.

Following employment stints with a law firm and the food service industry, she found her way to stripping. On a mid-1990s cross-country adult club tour with fellow dancer Teresa Dulce, they became stranded in Portland, OR. By this time, she was already known as “Miss Mona” – a pseudonym tattooed on her knuckles.

Throughout her 2009 memoir Magic Gardens, Portland dancer Liv “Viva Las Vegas” Osthus’ names Mona as guiding inspiration during their time together on stage at iconic Portland strip bar Mary's Club. Mona would appear at the book release party to read passages from the book and perform.

Thank You For Supporting The Arts, the documentary about Osthus’ return to stripping following breast cancer, also has Osthus credit Mona as an indispensable mentor whose drolly confrontational approach to sex work “would almost antagonize the viewer.”

Her intermittent dancing career lasted from 1993 to 2002. She also organized and hosted semi-satirical erotic burlesque revues entitled Miss Mona's Cabaret. A 20th anniversary reunion was held at the Star Theater in 2019. She has said dancing and art offer a similar “Zen experience.”

In 1995, Superhero and Dulce would go found Danzine – an indie periodical focused on stripper-themed shopping tips, health data, and legal information. The print run of its first issue was just sixty Xeroxed copies of a single page that the pair passed out around club dressing rooms.

”Though knocked by some for their knee-jerk politics,” wrote the Oregonian, “Danzine … advocated for the health and rights of the city's sex-workers with zeal and frankness.” Three years later, it would sponsor the United States’ first sex worker film festival.

Eventually, as other dancers began contributing, Danzine grew to encompass a number of different social outreach programs including a needle exchange van that disposed of 180K+ used syringes, a tip line warning escorts about dangerous clientele, and, adjoining the nonprofit's publishing offices, a vintage store called Miss Mona's Rack.

In his Portland travelog, Fugitives and Refugees, Fight Club author Chuck Palahniuk describes the shambling inventory as “secondhand shoes, clothes and jewelry, plus razors, condoms, … tampons, [and] a staggering variety of lubricants, with all profits going to support community job training and risk-reduction programs that teach HIV and other STD prevention.”

Over eight years and 18 issues – the last running 36 pages with glossy cover and national distribution – an estimated 350 volunteers donated 27K hours of their time assisting various components of the DIY project.

Cutbacks in the Multnomah County Health Department and a generally weakening economy forced Danzine and Miss Mona's Rack to permanently close in the summer of 2003 following a final fundraising ‘Last Fiesta’ headlined by Storm Large.

The Danzine HQ would be re-created the following year inside New York City's Whitney Museum as part of a group exhibition that also included works by Sophie Calle, Alfredo Jaar, and Yoko Ono.

== Duct tape ==
After the fall of Miss Mona's Rack, she spent a few years traveling around the United States before returning to Portland with the same stage name but new artistic focus – layering slivers of tape atop melamine slabs for brash, intricate, candy-colored pop art relief imagery.

Although most critics have assumed she primarily utilizes duct tape, she's said that the (locally based) Winston Tape Company also supplies her with “ utility tape, strapping tape, masking tape, cloth tape, copper tape, gold foil tape … this camouflage tape that's neat but … too busy, it'll drive you nuts.” Stashes of rare and discontinued tapes have been hidden. The tape's set down, X-Acto-cut-strip by strip, onto MDF panels with vinyl coating to ensure the stick and then fully varnished eight times.

According to her own story, she found herself drawn to a roll in a Virginia hardware store and started assembling musician portraits. "I almost cried the day when I discovered strapping tape," she told the Oregonian.

Superhero was entirely self-taught and has said that these pieces marked her first foray into the world of fine art. Despite the lack of formal instruction or sales/promotional assistance, she has become internationally known and won several notable commissions. Her influences include Love and Rockets comics, Bollywood posters, Soviet agitprop, and Miles Davis album covers.

Noting similarities to the commercialism of Andy Warhol, colors of Peter Max, and sheer laboriousness of pointillism, an early Oregonian review raved that her “cutting-edge … images of slinky roller-girls, a silhouette of Miles Davis, voodoo icons with purple vests and sexy Pachinko pinball machine goddesses (ka-ching!) are an eyeful of vivid living color.” Marveling at the “sprawling, neo-surrealist tableaux,” Willamette Week considered “the imagery … sexy, compositionally dense and chromatically bold.”

By the time of her 2003 breakout Portland exhibition – a Pop Art group show entitled SinTax at Belinki & DuPrey Gallery – word of Mona's duct tape art had already begun to spread from her contribution to collaborative shows in Seattle and New York. A show at Aalto Lounge curated by Danzine-vet Marne Lucas would follow.

The next year, her piece for Portland's Motel Gallery drew praise as a standout work intended to work with the gallery's spatial restraint – 100 different artists were each asked to fill one square foot of the Motel Gallery's wall.

Also that spring, she had an exhibition at the Roq la Rue gallery in Seattle. Her fourth show, the Miller Brewing Company-sponsored “Polydelphic Oblivion” was held at Williamsburg, Brooklyn, McCaig-Welles gallery.

In 2005, she debuted 13 new works in a major show at Portland's Gallery 500. “Superhero's art reputation has been rising ever since … the Aalto Lounge [exhibit] a few years ago garnered critical exposure,” wrote the Oregonian about her “Art Deco cartoons.”

“Since the utility tape was cut,” observed the PSU Vanguard, “rich vivid colors stood out solid with sharp tight lines [and] thoughtful layering – one piece had a massive boom-box … under a layered red sky [that] you could only see … [when] close enough to lick it.”

Willamette Week noted that her “intricately fashioned … album art-meets-Byzantium tableaux” had grown “more complex in imagery and technique.”

While on tour, Pat MacDonald flew in to perform at her ‘First Thursday’ opening.

Also that year. she was asked to design the front cover for Hillstomp’s second LP The Woman That Ended The World. Willamette Week described the resulting cover as “a vivid duct-tape work by local artist Miss Mona Superhero of a striking woman leaving a man on his knees at a rail station.”

A decade later, in their annual Best of Portland cavalcade, Willamette Week readers voted for Mona as Portland's Best Visual Artist above runner-up Sienna Morris.

By 2006, her pieces were priced between $400 and $1000. About her autumn exhibition at Rox la Rue, Seattle Weekly commented: “Sure, Mona Superhero’s … gimmicky … but we’ll forgive her because the work is so damn accomplished. These pieces are sexy, brash, and surreal [yet] surprisingly tender.”

Shows at Boston's RHYS Gallery, Los Angeles’ Black Maria Gallery, and Portland's Salon d’Merde would follow in the coming years. She was part of the 2009 NYC group exhibition “All That Glitters Is Gold” curated by Cope2. In 2011. she was among the creators invited to take part in the Artwork from the Void program.

The next year, she partnered with PDX non-profit P:EAR Mentor for a summer exhibition with proceeds aiding at-risk homeless youth and contributed a piece to the “Faux Masters” at Old Town’s Faux Museum alongside Joe Sacco Melody Owen, and other nationally prominent talents.

By 2014, date of her Bill Murray-themed show at Good: A Gallery, Willamette Week believed recent portraits were “technically and thematically her tightest ever” and, comparing her plight to local artist Bruce Conkle found it “more than a little damning of Portland's sometimes shortsighted gallery culture that … she isn't represented by a Portland gallery, even though her work … is exhibited far beyond the Northwest.”

At this stage, Mona's artwork averaged around $800 per work at this point, and she had started to market prints, stationery, and accessories on Etsy. She has contributed work to and appeared as symposium guest during the annual Sex Workers’ Art Show held each year by the Portland Institute for Contemporary Arts.

Mona serves as in-house muralist for the Portland-based Voodoo Donuts franchise and designs a site-specific piece for each location.

The 8X16’ works commissioned for shops in Eugene and Denver were her largest attempted to that point and required months to fully finish. “Your Wish Is My Command”, at the Orlando outpost, features a genie's piercing stare above a Froot Loop-encrusted crystal donut. The mural adorning Austin's franchise shows a pair of space-helmeted adventurers on horseback framing a disco death star.
