= Armand Peri =

American bodybuilder, artist, author, and entrepreneur

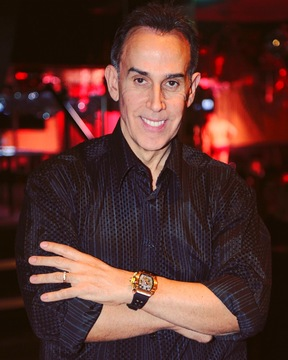
- Born: July 14, 1965 (age 61); Vila do Conde, (Porto District)
- Citizenship: United States
- Education: New Jersey Institute of Technology
- Occupations: Entrepreneur, Bodybuilder
- Known for: Founder and CEO of New York's Hunk-O-Mania nightclub
- Website: armandperi.com

Armand Peri (born July 14, 1965) is a Portuguese-born American entrepreneur, former competitive bodybuilder, artist and author. He is the founder of Hunk-O-Mania, an American entertainment company specializing in live male revue performances. Established in 1998, the company began in the New York metropolitan area and expanded to other cities in the United States.

== Early life and education ==
Peri was born in Vila do Conde, in the Porto District of Portugal. He emigrated to the United States with his family at the age of 12 and settled in New Jersey. In a 2019 interview with Observer, he recalled experiencing difficulties adjusting to American society because he initially spoke little English and encountered bullying at school.

Peri attended an arts-oriented secondary school in Newark, New Jersey, and later studied at the School of Visual Arts in New York City. He pursued architectural studies at the New Jersey Institute of Technology.

== Career ==
Peri participated in competitions organized by the National Physique Committee (NPC) and later entered regional and national events.

Peri began working as a male exotic dancer. He later adopted the stage name "Armando the Barbarian", a reference to the 1982 film Conan the Barbarian. In a 2019 interview, he said that working as a dancer helped him overcome his initial discomfort with public performance.

=== Hunk-O-Mania ===
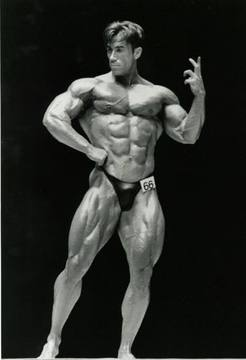
Armand Peri in bodybuilding form

In 1998, Peri established Hunk-O-Mania, a live entertainment business specializing in male striptease and revue performances primarily marketed toward women.

By 2012, Peri told The Daily Beast that he owned male revue operations in four states. A 2013 article in The New Yorker described him as a significant operator in Manhattan's male entertainment market at a time when the Chippendales organization was attempting to re-establish a presence in New York City.

Peri has appeared in the films Magic Mike (2012) and Magic Mike XXL (2015). In 2015, Variety interviewed Peri and dancer Ahmed Rhodes about Magic Mike XXL. TIME also featured Peri in its reporting on professional male dancers' reactions to the film. He commented on the physical preparation expected of performers and the suitability of actor Channing Tatum for a professional revue.

In 2020, VICE reported on the financial impact of the pandemic on male entertainment companies and their employees. Peri said that Hunk-O-Mania had experienced a sharp decline in bookings following the suspension of live entertainment and private events.

In 2019, Peri published the self-help book Unparalleled Success: How to Become Highly Effective in Every Aspect of Your Life through New Age Productions.

== Personal life ==
Peri is married to Francielle Melo, also known as Fran Peri, who has participated in the management of his entertainment businesses. The couple have three children together. Peri also has a child from an earlier marriage.

In a 2019 interview with Men's Health, Francielle and Armand Peri discussed the relationship between their family life and his work in the adult entertainment industry.
