= Feminist views on striptease =

Type of professional exotic dancer

A feminist stripper is a professional exotic dancer who does not conform to the stereotypes associated with exotic dancers, and instead identifies positively with the identity of stripper. Feminist strippers are sex-positive feminists who view their profession as a choice and a career field. Feminist strippers interact with their profession in a positive manner and view it as a female-centric form of power by asserting their autonomy and by making informed decisions in regard to the regulation of their bodies.

The autonomy of feminist strippers is seen through their ability to choose for whom they perform, when they will perform, the content of their performance, and how long it will last. "Since one must exercise control over one's life to be autonomous, autonomy is something that a person accomplishes, not something that happens to persons. But freedom is precisely a combination of self-creation and what happens to you". There is liberation in the free expression of their sexuality. Becoming a stripper can give a "curious kind of control over those who watched". Roberta Perkin's work with sex workers showed that they "exerted a significant amount of control over their working lives, felt empowered by their work and most were not arrested or subjected to violence."

== Benefits ==
Feminist strippers exercise their freedom of sexuality, that is their freedom to choose how to use their bodies in interaction with their environment, through their performances, and this freedom contributes to a feeling of power and control. The amount of pay received can place strippers in an economic position of superiority over women in other occupations.

== Criticism ==
There is debate surrounding the justification of viewing stripping as a feminist act. Some feminists regard stripping as a violation of human rights and dignity, saying that stripping, and sexual exploitation will be the "end of feminism." This criticism is supported by societal views of women who engage in sexual acts for money, and the social stigmas associated with sex acts. Social stigmas surrounding stripping such as gang affiliation, drug use, STDs, and prostitution contribute to the criticism of women who become exotic dancers.

Feminists and non-feminists alike can view stripping as the exploitation and objectification of the female body, "the act of stripping overvalues physical perfection and abstracts the sexual qualities of the female body, it places voyeuristic men in the position of judges and arbiters of the female face."

When I read some of the stuff written by so-called "feminist allies" it feels like they are fighting over bodies. Some of them say they are "pro-prostitution," as if it could be that easy. Then there are the others who say that prostitution is evil because it contributes to violence against women. ... It's like prostitutes are just these bodies who are somehow connected to something bad and evil or something good and on the cutting edge of revolution. They just turn us into symbols.

— Interview, Chapkis 1997, 211

== Noted feminist strippers ==
- Matilda Bickers
- Diablo Cody
- Teresa Dulce
- Nina Hartley
- Annie Sprinkle

== Literature ==
- Lewin, Lauri (1986). Naked is the best disguise: my life as a stripper. London: Pandora. ISBN 978-0863580772.
- Barton, Bernadette (2006). Stripped: inside the lives of exotic dancers. New York: New York University Press. ISBN 978-0814799338.
- Cody, Diablo (2006). Candy Girl: A Year in the Life of an Unlikely Stripper. New York, N.Y., U.S.A.: Gotham Books. ISBN 978-1-59240-182-6.
- Hageman, Sheila (2012). Stripping down: a memoir. Seattle, Wash: Pink Fish Press. ISBN 9780615584973.
- Tressler, Sarah (2012). Diary of an Angry Stripper. Houston, Texas: Di Angelo Publications. ISBN 9780985085322.
- Frances, Jacqueline (2015). The Beaver Show. CreateSpace Independent Publishing Platform. ISBN 978-1515313120.
