= Stripper =

Striptease performer

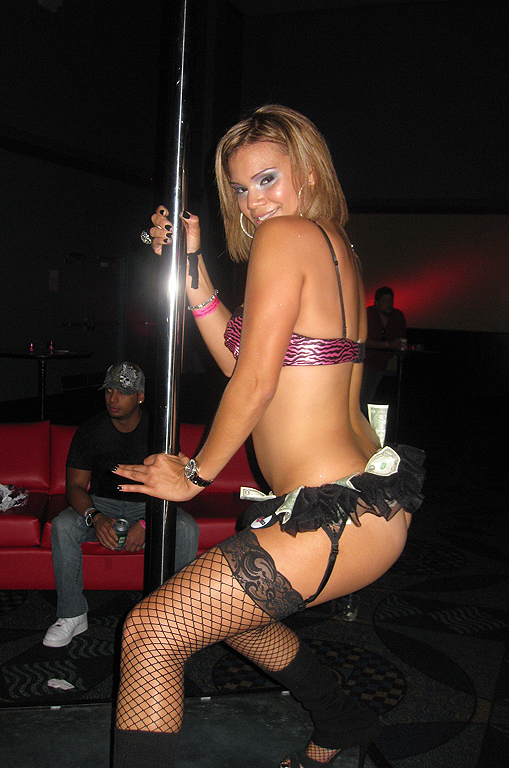
- A stripper performing with tips she has received (Miami, 2009)

Occupation
- Names: Exotic dancer, erotic dancer, dancer
- Occupation type: Performing arts, sex industry
- Activity sectors: Strip clubs, exhibitions, festivals, competitions, busking

Description
- Competencies: Striptease, pole dancing, cage dancing, lap dancing
- Fields of employment: Adult entertainment
- Related jobs: Nude modeling, pornography

A stripper or exotic dancer is a person whose occupation involves performing striptease in a public adult entertainment venue such as a strip club. At times, a stripper may be hired to perform at private events.

Modern forms of stripping minimize the interaction of strippers with customers, reducing the importance of the tease in the performance in favor of speed of undress (the strip). Not all strippers are comfortable dancing topless or fully nude, but in general, full nudity is common where not prohibited by law. The integration of the burlesque pole as a frequently used prop has shifted the emphasis in the performance toward a more acrobatic, explicit form of expression compared to the slow-developing burlesque style. Most strippers work in strip clubs. A house dancer works for a particular club or franchise, while a feature dancer typically has her own celebrity, touring a club circuit and making appearances. Strippers are often not direct employees of clubs but instead perform as independent contractors.

Before the 1970s, strippers in Western cultures were almost invariably female, performing to male audiences, usually in strip clubs. At the same time, strippers of all genders were dancing in underground clubs or as part of a theatre experience. Since the 1970s, mainstream stripping has adopted a greater gender diversity and male strippers have become an established form of entertainment for female audiences. Their performances are usually fully choreographed, involving dance routines and costumes. Certain male and female strippers also perform for LGBT audiences as well as for all genders in bisexual contexts.

== Strip clubs ==
Strippers most commonly work in strip clubs. In the United States there are an estimated 4000 clubs classified as "adult" or "exotic" which provide partial or full nudity. House dancers are strippers who dance regularly at a particular club. They are not usually direct employees, instead performing as independent contractors for a predetermined house fee. Feature dancers, who usually have celebrity status, tour the strip club circuit across the U.S. and make live promotional appearances. Until the mid-2000s, high-profile female porn stars were often highly paid as feature dancers in the U.S., touring to earn extra income and build their fan base. Examples include Teagan Presley, Jenna Haze and Jenna Jameson.

=== Work environment ===
In some localities, strippers are required to obtain permits to work in adult entertainment. They usually have to audition before being hired. Formal training is minimal or non-existent. Strippers learn from peers, through observation and interaction with more experienced dancers.

Touching strippers is not permitted in many localities; few dancers and clubs allow touching of dancers during private dances. If permitted, during a lap dance the dancer may dance sitting in the customer's lap, clothed or topless. In parts of the US, there are laws forbidding the exposure of female nipples, which the dancers must cover with pasties. Clubs often classify strippers as independent contractors, rather than employees, in order to avoid diverse expenses. This can lead to a loss of workers' benefits including overtime, minimum wage levels, unemployment compensation, health insurance, sick time and vacation time. Such employment practices have sometimes been demonstrated in court to be illegal. Strippers are also often required to pay a nightly "house fee" or "floor fee" to the club in order to be allowed to perform. The size of the fee varies, and is paid even if a stripper makes little or no money that night.

=== Stage performance ===
Strippers usually take turns dancing on stage to one or more songs in a fixed sequence which repeats during a shift, though the pattern may be interrupted if they perform private dances or move to the VIP room. Some clubs have more than one stage, with strippers initially dancing on a main stage before moving to a side stage. If a DJ is present, they will emcee the rotation, announcing the performers. Feature entertainers have set times for their performance, and are not usually part of the rotation. In more informal clubs, dancers take turns on stage when it becomes empty, or there may be a free flow of dancers wandering on and off stage at will.

=== Tipping ===
In the United States, strippers dancing on stage are often tipped by audience members who slide dollar bills under the waistband of their G-strings. Strippers are also sometimes given tips offstage by audience members during conversation or private dances such as lap dances. Rules concerning tipping vary widely. In most strip clubs in Portland, Oregon, tipping during a stage performance is expected. Tipping in New Jersey strip clubs is prohibited during stage performances, and it takes place afterwards when the dancers walk around the club, usually by inserting banknotes into their costumes. In strip clubs in the UK, where there is less of a tipping culture, it is rare for dancers on stage to receive tips.

=== Private dances ===
Private dances, typically table dances or lap dances, are erotic dances performed for strip club customers. Table dances generally take place in the main lounge or open seating areas of the club and are performed on a customer's table or a small portable platform carried by the dancer. Table dancers maintain their distance from customers and there is usually no physical contact between the two. Lap dances involve more personal interaction and usually take place in a private or semi-private area of a club. Lap dancers sit directly on a customer's lap while performing a series of sexual moves in order to arouse them. Air dances, a variant of lap dances, have little or no physical contact between the dancer and the customer.

A champagne room (also called a champagne lounge or champagne court) is a specialized VIP Room service offered by gentleman's clubs where a customer can purchase time (usually in half-hour increments) with an exotic dancer in a private room on the premises. In more expensive clubs the room, which is away from the main club, is well decorated and usually has its own bar. Clubs sell champagne by the glass or by the bottle for both the dancer and the customer.

== Other locations ==
Strippers can be contracted for performances outside the strip club environment. Some strippers will only strip for private engagements and do not have a regular affiliation with a strip club.

Adult industry trade shows often have strippers working, though many of them are affiliated with individual companies and not necessarily freelancers. There are also exhibitions, festivals, and competitions where independent strippers perform. Nudes-A-Poppin' was a popular erotic dance contest that took place annually in Indiana, US, from 1975 until 2019.

=== Bachelor and bachelorette parties ===
A bachelor party may involve going to a strip club or hiring a stripper to perform in a private setting like a home or hotel. In some traditions, there are hazing-like tests and pranks at the future groom's expense, and these can involve a stripper. A male stripper is sometimes hired to perform at bachelorette parties.

=== Private parties ===
Some entertainment businesses provide strippers for performances at private parties.

== Performance ==
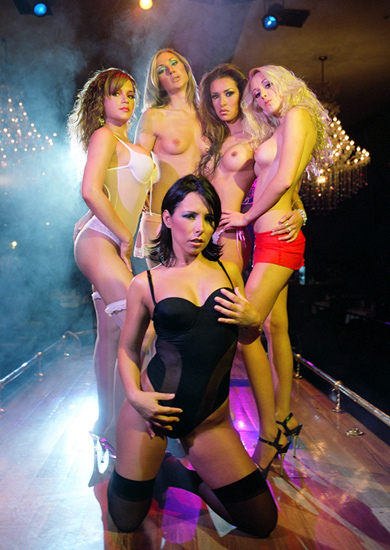
Strippers at a strip club in Zona Rosa, Mexico City (2011)

While working, a stripper is not necessarily required to remove all of their clothing. The clubs, bars and other venues where strippers work may allow full nudity or be limited to toplessness or bikinis, often as a result of zoning or licensing laws.

=== Style of dress ===
==== Topless ====
On 19 June 1964, Carol Doda began go-go dancing topless at the Condor Club on Broadway and Columbus in the North Beach neighborhood of San Francisco. She became the world's most famous go-go dancer, and a prototype for the modern stripper, while dancing at the Condor for 22 years.

Female strippers often appear topless in adult-only venues, ranging from downmarket strip clubs to upmarket cabarets, such as the Moulin Rouge. They sometimes take part in wet T-shirt contests in which they display their breasts through translucent wet fabric.

Topless dancing is banned in many jurisdictions, but strippers sometimes work around this by briefly uncovering their breasts. Many clubs do not allow customers to touch the dancers' breasts. For male dancers, a bare chest is not considered in the same light and does not face the same restrictions.

==== Full nudity ====
Full nudity is banned in many jurisdictions, but many dancers work around this constraint by briefly uncovering their intimate parts. In some locations, such as parts of rural western Maine, venues offering partial nudity can lose customers to rivals offering full nudity. Strippers who offer a greater degree of nudity in their performance may make more money, but some strippers nevertheless prefer not to strip completely and only dance at topless clubs.

=== Customer interaction ===
Strippers are focused on making money from customers. Strippers are employed as independent contractors and expected to generate income themselves making the profession similar to a sales job. How dancers go about maximizing revenue varies. For customers they do not already know, dancers use factors such as clothing, shoes, age, and race to determine whom they wish to interact with. Dancers are the primary enablers to encourage potential patrons to spend time in strip clubs. The dancers continually interact with the customers in the club by walking around and attempting to solicit drinks and lap dances, usually scanning the floor of a club to find the most lucrative customer.

While clubs can generate revenue through means such as cover charges and drink fees, dancers make most of their profit from giving lap dances or VIP dances where regulations allow. Otherwise, customer tips to dancers from a stage set are their primary form of payment per shift. The dancer qualifies a customer by sizing up their appearance and personal characteristics. Once the dancer decides on a customer, she approaches and attempts to engage the customer in conversation, hoping they'll purchase a dance or time in VIP areas. Alternatively, customers can make the first move and engage the dancer directly. Strippers appeal to masculine desires, but they can adapt to fit the needs of female patrons to view them as customers. Adapting the experience to the customer is an integral part of exotic dancing.

=== Mainstreaming ===
In the 21st century, as adult themes and work are becoming more commonplace, more of the population is attracted to this type of work. For example, a University of Leeds study, published by the British Journal of Sociology of Education, revealed that as many as one third of "strip club dancers are students, with many using the cash earned to support themselves throughout their studies" and likely to come from middle class backgrounds. The study also stated that "students were now a 'core supply group into the sex industries', with clubs even targeting freshers' week events with recruitment leaflets." This is supported by a 2014 story in the New York Daily News regarding San Francisco strip clubs taking out recruitment ads in the university newspaper for the University of California at Berkeley, The Daily Californian. One distinction made is that many view working as a strip club dancer as a short-term means to address financial needs, while others view it as a profession and go on to other types of sex work such as performing in adult films.

=== Gender roles ===
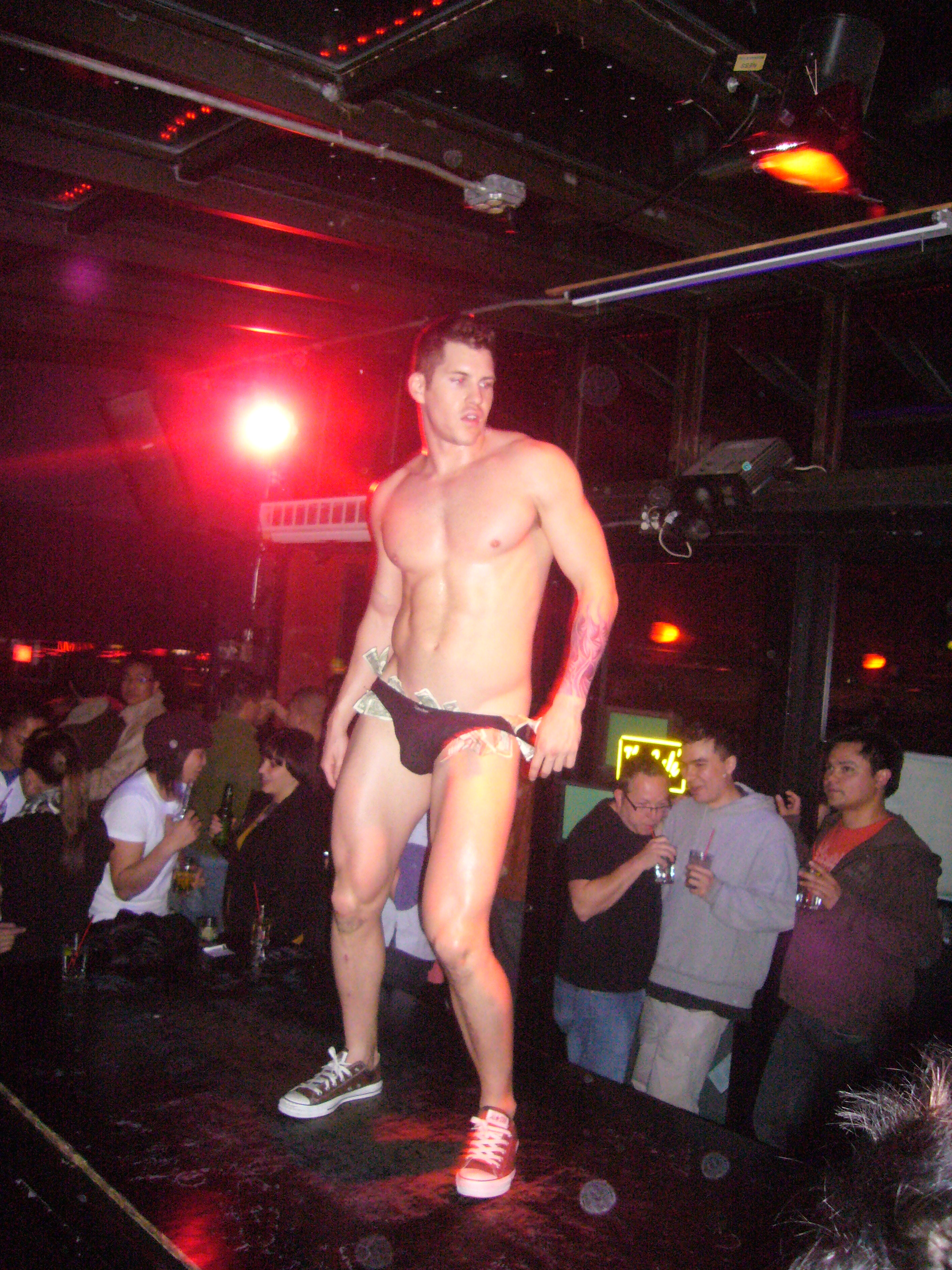
Male stripper performing in San Francisco in 2009

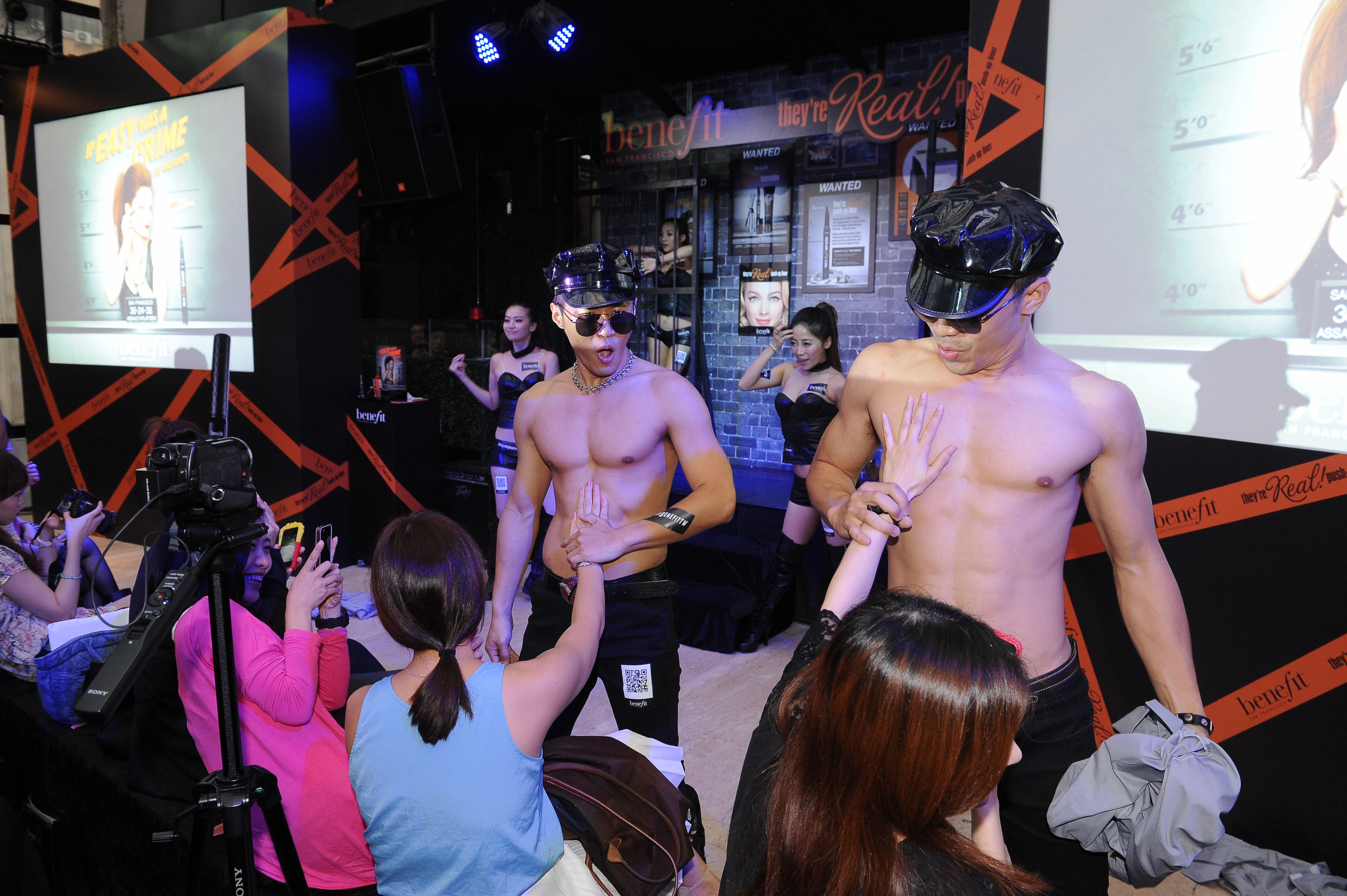
Male strippers at a 2014 event by Benefit Cosmetics

==== Male strippers ====
The first male strippers began performing in the 1970s. Male stripping became popular with the advent of the Chippendales dance troupe in the 1980s and its popularity increased in the 1990s with the release of the film The Full Monty.

The modern male stripper usually strips down to his underwear. Performances are generally choreographed and typically involve a costume. Male strippers mostly perform at private advanced bookings (such as bachelorette parties), ladies' nights and at gay clubs.

The social psychologist Richard Tewksbury says that male strippers 'masculinise' the role; thus are not disempowered in the way that, he asserts, female strippers are.

==== Sexuality and gender bias ====
Ethnographic research has observed that strippers, regardless of sexual orientation, have a tendency to treat female customers differently than males. Because of the non-physical motivations ascribed to female intimacy, dancers select women to approach who are smiling and sitting comfortably with open body language such as uncrossed arms, actively participating with the crowd, laughing and engaging with fellow customers, and applauding for dancers at the main stage also increase the likelihood they will be approached. Dancers tend to avoid women with unfriendly facial expressions or visibly hostile body language, again regardless of sexual orientation. In order to become approached, men must indicate financial potential through their appearance. Women must demonstrate their good attitude and willingness to participate in club activities. At that point, a woman's perceived profitability is also a factor in a dancer's decision to approach a female patron. The presence of male companionship has been cited in research as an indicator used by dancers to gauge the profitability of a female once she is perceived to be a customer.

=== In popular culture ===
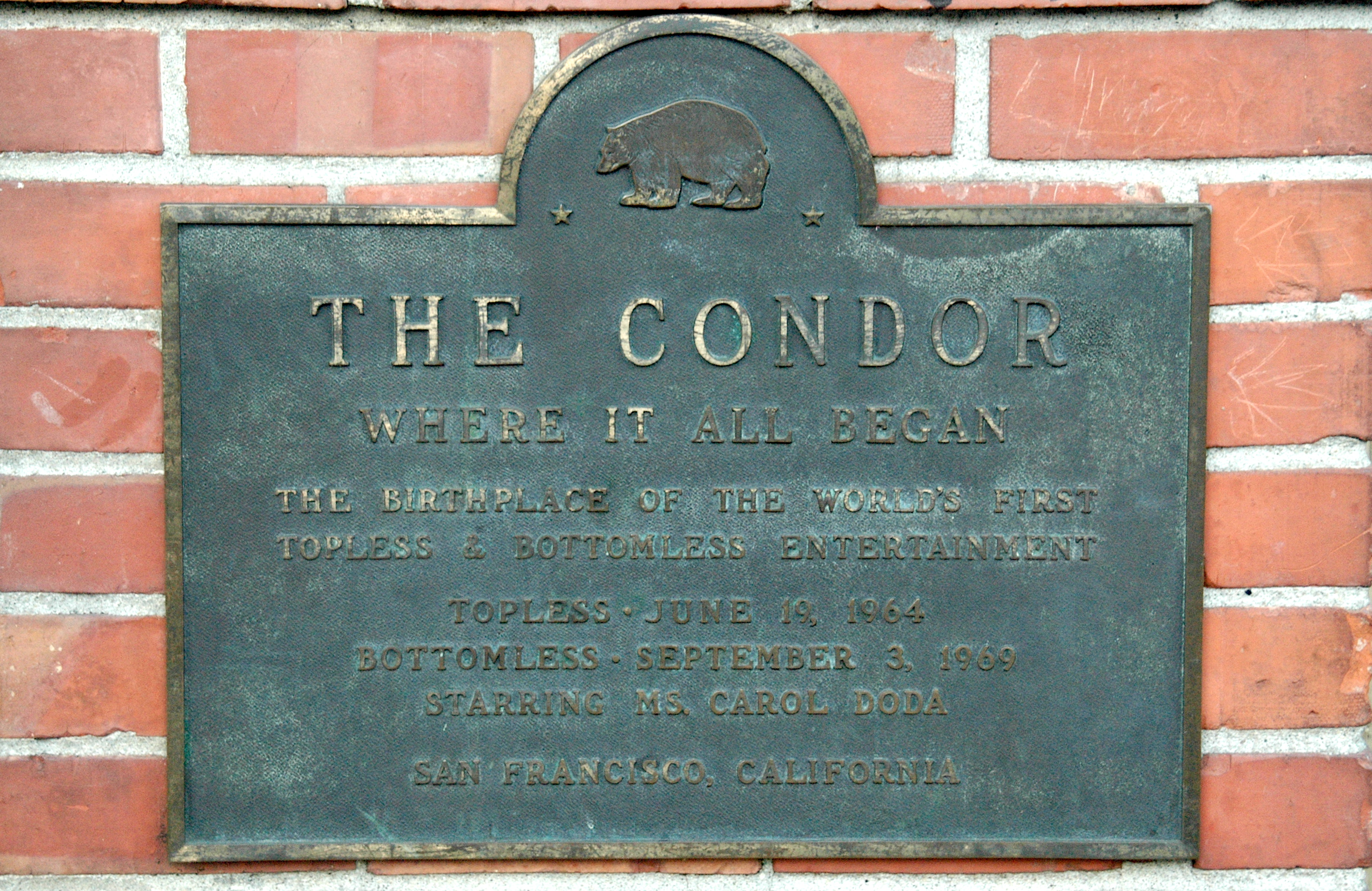
Historical marker at the original Condor Club site. Full text: "The Condor; Where it all began; The birthplace of the world's first topless & bottomless entertainment; Topless – June 19, 1964 Bottomless – September 3, 1969 Starring Ms. Carol Doda; San Francisco, California"

The image of strippers has evolved through the late 1960s and 1970s in the U.S. and international cultures which embraced Americanized striptease. By the 1980s pole dancing had become popular in America, and the highly sexual imagery associated with the period's performers was widely accepted and frequently portrayed in film, television, and theater.

==== 1980s–1990s ====
In addition to lesser-known videos, the 1980s also featured mainstream films involving strippers and their work as part of the central narrative. These included Flashdance (1983), which told the story of blue-collar worker Alexandra "Alex" Owens (Jennifer Beals), who works as an exotic dancer in a Pittsburgh bar at night and at a steel mill as a welder during the day. Blaze (1989) features Lolita Davidovitch as notorious stripper Blaze Starr. Starr herself appears in the film in a cameo role. Exotica (1994), directed by Atom Egoyan, is set in a Canadian lap-dance club, and portrays a man's (Bruce Greenwood) obsession with a schoolgirl stripper named Christina (Mia Kirshner). Showgirls (1995) was directed by Paul Verhoeven and starred Elizabeth Berkley and Gina Gershon. Striptease (1996), was an adaptation of the novel starring Demi Moore. The Players Club (1998) starred LisaRaye McCoy as a girl who becomes a stripper to earn enough money to enter college and study journalism.

In Neighbours (1985), the character of Daphne is originally a stripper at Des's bucks party, and eventually goes on to marry him. Married... with Children (1987–97) often featured Al Bundy, Jefferson D'Arcy, and the NO MA'AM crew spending a night at the Nudie Bar. In The Sopranos (1999–2007) business was often conducted at the Bada Bing strip club.

==== 21st century ====
Dancing at the Blue Iguana (2000) is a feature film starring Sandra Oh and Daryl Hannah. The female cast of the film researched the film by dancing at strip clubs and created their parts and their storylines to be as realistic as possible. Strip Search (2001) is an Australian reality television show about the training of male strippers. The Hot Chick (2002) stars Rachel McAdams, in her film debut, as a high school cheerleader who, after switching bodies with a small time criminal (Rob Schneider), starts working at a strip club called Pole Cat. The Raymond Revuebar: The Art of Striptease (2002) is a documentary, directed by Simon Weitzman. Los Debutantes (2003) is a Chilean film set in a strip club in Santiago. In Closer (2004), Natalie Portman plays Alice Ayres aka Jane Jones, a young American stripper who arrives in London, England. Portman won the Golden Globe Award for Best Supporting Actress – Motion Picture for her performance. Rob Zombie's 2007 Halloween remake features Michael Myers' mother Deborah (played by Zombie's wife Sheri Moon Zombie), dancing to "Love Hurts" by Nazareth.

I Know Who Killed Me (2007) stars Lindsay Lohan as Dakota Moss, an alluring stripper involved in the actions of a serial killer, and features a long striptease sequence at a strip club. In Planet Terror (2007), Rose McGowan plays go-go dancer Cherry Darling who, after having her leg eaten by a zombie, uses an assault rifle as a prosthetic leg. In the two-part season 6 finale of Degrassi: The Next Generation, Alex Nunez resorts to stripping after she and her mother do not have enough money to pay the rent on their apartment. Darren Aronofsky's 2008 drama film The Wrestler features Marisa Tomei playing a stripper and single mother who is romantically pursued by professional wrestler Randy "The Ram" Robinson (Mickey Rourke). Tomei received a nomination for the Academy Award for Best Supporting Actress for her performance. Zombie Strippers (2008) chronicles a zombie virus that makes its way to a strip club. Barely Phyllis is a play about the 1940s British striptease artiste Phyllis Dixey which was first staged at the Pomegranate Theatre, Chesterfield in 2009. The Hangover (2009) features Heather Graham as a Las Vegas stripper and escort who marries Stu (Ed Helms) despite his plan to propose to his girlfriend (Rachael Harris). She reprised her role in the sequel The Hangover III.

The seventh episode of season 6 of the CBS crime drama Criminal Minds focuses on the BAU team tracking down a trio of young men who kidnap, rape, and murder several exotic dancers in Indiana. The 2012 film Magic Mike and 2015 sequel Magic Mike XXL are fictionalized stories of the lives of several male performers. In We're the Millers (2013), Jennifer Aniston plays a stripper who is hired by her drug dealer neighbor to pose as his wife in order to smuggle marijuana from Mexico into America. Lap Dance (2014), which stars Briana Evigan and Carmen Electra, focuses on an aspiring actress who makes a pact with her husband to take a job as an exotic dancer so she can make money to care for her cancer-stricken father. It is based on the true story of the film's director Greg Carter. Dixieland (2015) involves Riley Keough as a stripper making money to support her sick mother and is also being abused by her manager. In the TV series La que se avecina, Lola Reynolds (played by Macarena Gómez), changes her job and works as a stripper after know she will earn more money.

==== Music and spoken word ====
Strippers have been the inspiration for a number of musical artists, with several of the songs resulting in hit singles. An instrumental, "The Stripper", was a No. 1 hit on the U.S. pop singles charts for David Rose and His Orchestra in 1962. That song pre-dated the opening of what is considered to be the first modern strip club, Condor Club on Broadway in the U.S. city of San Francisco, California. "Private Dancer" by Tina Turner was an international hit and her second highest-charting single reaching No. 7 on the U.S. Billboard Hot 100 chart. "Girls, Girls, Girls" by Mötley Crüe was also a Top 20 hit on the U.S. charts.

T-Pain had a No. 5 hit on the Billboard chats with "I'm 'n Luv (Wit a Stripper)" in 2006. Hip hop artist Flo Rida had two No. 1 hits in the U.S. in the 2000s with "Right Round" and "Low". For both hip-hop artists, the depictions of strippers and expressions of lust are far more explicit than in songs released in earlier music eras. This is not limited to hip-hop, with contemporary songs in other styles of music sharing similar traits. "Worked Up So Sexual" by The Faint is graphic in its depiction of dancer rivalry (older dancers gag at what new talent seems to mean, smaller tits and younger limbs) and customers longing to bed them.

Achille Lauro represented San Marino in the Eurovision Song Contest 2022 with the song "Stripper".

==== Video games ====
Duke Nukem 3D (1996) was the first video game to include strippers. The Grand Theft Auto series has strippers and strip clubs in many of its games, starting with Grand Theft Auto: Vice City (2002).

== Legal issues ==
=== Laws and court cases ===
Many U.S. jurisdictions have specific laws related to striptease, with more being added, leading to greater complexity in compliance and enforcement. For example, the classification of dancers as independent contractors has been challenged in court, successfully in Massachusetts in 2009. One of the more famous examples of such local ordinances is San Diego Municipal Code 33.3610, which is specific and strict in response to allegations of corruption among local officials and contacts in the nude entertainment industry. Among its provisions is the "six foot rule", copied by other municipalities, that requires dancers to maintain a six-foot distance from audience members while performing.

There are a limited amount of dancers and clubs that condone touching of dancers during private dances, and it is illegal in many U.S. states. In some locales, dancers may give a customer a "lap dance", whereby the dancer grinds against the customer's crotch while they are fully clothed. Other rules forbid "full nudity". In some parts of the US, there are laws forbidding the exposure of female nipples, which have thus to be covered by pasties by the dancer (though not applied to the exposure of male nipples). In early 2010, the U.S. city of Detroit, Michigan banned fully exposed breasts in its strip clubs, following the example of Houston, Texas who began enforcing a similar ordinance in 2008. The Detroit city council has since softened the rules eliminating the requirement for pasties but kept other restrictions. Both municipalities were reputed to have rampant occurrences of illicit activity including prostitution linked to its striptease establishments within their city limits.

In 1930 the Windmill Theatre, opened in London, and began to present nude shows, British law prohibited performers moving whilst in a state of nudity. To get around that rule, models appeared naked in stationary tableaux vivants. To keep within the law, sometimes devices were used which rotated the models without them moving themselves. Fan dances were another device used to keep performances within the law. These allowed a naked dancer's body to be concealed by her fans or those of her attendants, until the end of an act, when she posed naked for a brief interval whilst standing stock still, and the lights went out or the curtain dropped to allow her to leave the stage.

In 2010, Iceland outlawed striptease. Jóhanna Sigurðardóttir, Iceland's prime minister, said: "The Nordic countries are leading the way on women's equality, recognizing women as equal citizens rather than commodities for sale." The politician behind the bill, Kolbrún Halldórsdóttir, said: "It is not acceptable that women or people in general are a product to be sold."

=== Collective bargaining ===
As the sex industry has grown and become a more established sector of national economies, sex workers—strippers included—have mobilized to negotiate or demand workplace rights. One means of collectivization pursued by strippers is the formation of labor unions, which involves formal membership. These strippers' unions have tended to focus on economic and workers' rights rather than civil rights, which constitutes a significant departure from the advocacy groups for prostitutes' rights that began in the 1970s and 1980s. The stigma attached to sex work also creates another obstacle to organization because many strippers and other types of sex workers are uncomfortable with declaring their profession publicly, even in a movement to improve their work environment and benefits.

One potential critique of the organization of strippers and sex workers of other types is that people in management positions in these industries, who are in a position to perpetuate the exploitation that sex workers face, can infiltrate these labor organizations and lobby for the maintenance of a status quo.

==== Australia ====
The Striptease Artists of Australia formed in 1998 and became a registered union in 2002. Its objective was reform and legitimise the industry by setting up a standard rates and conditions. In order to achieve this, the union started a wage dispute with the employers so they could begin negotiations in the Australian Industrial Relations Commission (AIRC), which has the power to make rulings on the issue. In 2006 the AIRC granted strippers an industrial award that mandated industry-wide labor rights, including minimum standards for paid leave, meal breaks and rest periods. Despite this, changes to employment legislature under a Conservative government enabled employers to utilize loopholes such as employing strippers as sub-contractors.

Another group, the Scarlet Alliance, has been involved in advocacy and projects geared towards improving the standing of sex workers since its inception in 1989. While labor rights are an important part of this group's agenda, it is not a labor union.

==== Britain ====
The International Union of Sex Workers is a branch of the GMB, a major general union in Great Britain.

==== Canada ====
In the 1980s, the Vancouver Exotic Dancers Alliance formed and was active for about a decade. The Canadian Guild for Erotic Labour was established in 2003.

==== United States ====
The Lusty Lady of San Francisco is an example of collectivization of strippers in the U.S. When the strippers of the establishment unionized in 1996 through the Erotic Dancers' Alliance, the owners of the club closed it. In response, the strippers formed a cooperative in 2003 to run the club themselves, renamed the Looking Glass Collective. The Lusty Lady closed in 2013.

In 2023, strippers at the Star Garden Topless Dive Bar in North Hollywood, California voted to unionize and join the Actors' Equity Association, which made them the only group of unionized strippers in the United States.

== See also ==
- Bikini barista
- Bubble dance
- Burlesque
  - Neo-Burlesque
- Exhibitionism
- Feminist stripper
- Gown-and-glove striptease
- Hunk-O-Mania
- List of strip clubs
- List of strippers
- Pole dance
- Sex workers' rights
- Sex show
- Pornography
