= Elizabeth Stephens =

American artist and filmmaker

Beth Stephens
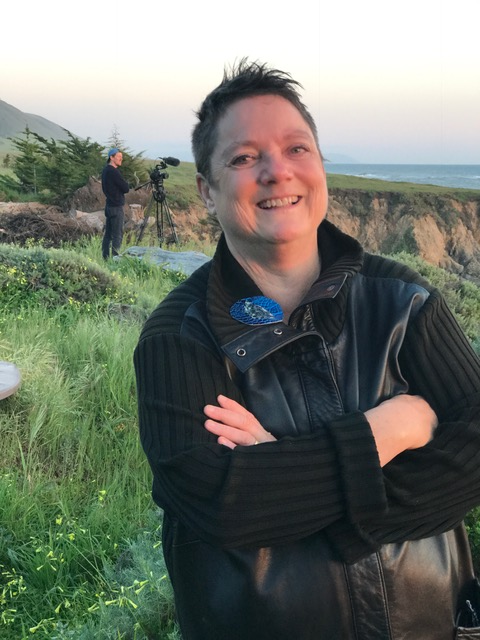
- Elizabeth Stephens near Cambria, California in 2016
- Born: Elizabeth M. Stephens; November 18, 1960 (age 65); Montgomery, West Virginia, U.S.
- Education: B.F.A., Tufts University (1986); M.F.A., Rutgers University (1992); Ph.D. UC Davis (2015)
- Occupations: Artist; sculptor; filmmaker; art professor; performer; professor; Chair of the Art Department at UC Santa Cruz
- Employer: UC Santa Cruz
- Notable work: SexEcology, Love Art Laboratory
- Title: Professor
- Spouse: Annie Sprinkle (m. 2007)

Elizabeth M. "Beth" Stephens (born November 18, 1960) is an American filmmaker, artist, sculptor, photographer, professor and two time Chair of the Art Department at UC Santa Cruz. Stephens, who describes herself as "ecosexual", collaborates with her wife since 2002, ecosexual artist, radical sex educator, and performer Annie Sprinkle.

== Early life ==
Stephens was born in Montgomery, West Virginia, on November 18, 1960. Her family co-owned Marathon Coal-bit company. She grew up in Appalachia, moving to Boston, New Jersey, and later to San Francisco. In her youth, her family attended a Presbyterian church.

== Career ==
Stephens studied Fine Arts at Tufts University, The Museum School, and Rutgers University. She worked with Martha Rosler and Geoffrey Hendricks in her graduate education. She has been a professor at UCSC since 1993, chaired the department from 2006 until 2009 and again from 2017 until 2020.

=== Love Art Laboratory ===
In December 2004, Stephens committed to doing seven years of art projects about love with her wife and art collaborator, Annie Sprinkle. They call this their Love Art Laboratory. Part of their project was to do an experimental art wedding each year, and each year had a different theme and color. The seven-year structure was adapted to their project by invitation of artist Linda M. Montano. Sprinkle and Stephens have done seventeen art weddings, fourteen with ecosexual themes. Critics relate the project to contemporary political debates including marriage equality, ecofeminism, and the environmental movement. Critics also note that Stephens' work explores and challenges the validity of the boundary between what is "art," and what is "pornography."

The Schlesinger Library at Harvard University acquired Stephen's papers, primarily focused on the Love Art Laboratory, and including her and her partner's work on Goodbye Gauley Mountain and their work at Documenta 2017.

=== Ecosexuality ===
Starting with their 2008 performance wedding to the Earth, Stephens and her partner Annie Sprinkle became pioneers of ecosexuality, a kind of earth-loving sexual identity, which states, "The Earth is our lover." Their Ecosex Manifesto proclaims that anyone can identify as an Ecosexual along with being "GLBTQI, heterosexual, asexual, and/or Other." They married the Earth, Sky, Sea, Moon, Appalachian Mountains, the Sun, and other non-human entities in nine different countries. Stephen's and Sprinkle's 2011 White Wedding to the Snow at the deconsecrated Saint Brigid's Church (Ottawa), by then St. Brigid’s Centre for the Arts, followed their performance at Montreal's Edgy Women Festival.

=== Feature films ===
Most recently Stephens has produced and directed two feature documentary films with Annie Sprinkle: Water Makes Us Wet: An Ecosexual Adventure (2017) and Goodbye Gauley Mountain: An Ecosexual Love Story (2013), a film addressing Mountaintop removal mining near her birthplace and its effects on the environment and nearby communities.

=== International exhibitions ===
Her work has been shown internationally, including at Museum Kunstpalast (Düsseldorf), El Ojo Atomico Antimuseo de Arte Contemporáneo (Spain), Museo Reina Sophia (Madrid), the San Francisco Museum of Modern Art, 53rd Venice Biennale, and Documenta 14.

In 2017, Stephens and her wife/collaborator Annie Sprinkle were official artists in Documenta 14. They presented performances and visual art, lectured, and previewed their new film documentary, Water Makes Us Wet: An Ecosexual Adventure.

== Honors and awards ==
- 2021: Guggenheim Fellowship in the creative arts category: film-video, appearing in the List of Guggenheim Fellowships awarded in 2021.
- 2026: with Annie Sprinkle Lifetime Achievement Award, Pornfilmfestival Berlin

== Bibliography ==
=== Director ===
- 1989 Women Eating
- 1989 Interviews with Oaxacan Women
- 1992 Do You Mind?
- 2004 Lüba; The Mother Teresa of Art
- 2005 Kiss
- 2006 Red Wedding One
- 2006 Orange Wedding Two
- 2006 Exposed; Experiments in Love, Sex, Death and Art
- 2013 Goodbye Gauley Mountain: An Ecosexual Love Story
- 2017 Water Makes Us Wet: An Ecosexual Adventure

=== Articles ===
- 1998 Looking Class Heroes: Dykes on Bikes Cruising Calendar Girls The Passionate Camera: Photography and Bodies of Desire
- 2004 Interview of Annie Sprinkle for Women and Performance — 20th Anniversary Issue, New York University Press
- 2008 Live through This; On Creativity and Self Destruction, Double Trouble in the Love Art Lab: Our Breast Cancer Experiments. ed. Sabrina Chapadjiev, Seven Stories Press, New York, pp 105–117
- 2010 Post Porn Politics; Queer_Feminist Perspective on the Politics of Porn Performance and Sex_Work as Culture Production, Post Porn Brunch, Elizabeth M. Stephens, Annie M. Sprinkle and Cosey Fanni Tutti, ed. Tim Stüttgen, B_Books, Berlin, Germany pages 88–115
- 2010 Elizabeth Stephens, Becoming Eco-Sexual, Canadian Theatre Review: Theatre in an Age of Eco Crisis, Volume 144, Fall 2010.
- 2012 Elizabeth Stephens and Annie Sprinkle, On Becoming Appalachian Moonshine, Performance Research: A Journal of the Performing Arts, Vol. 17, No. 4, August 16, 2012 pgs 61-66
- 2017 Documenta 14: Daybook, eds. Laimer, Quinn, Adam Symczyk, Prestel Press, Munich-London-New York, 2017, Annie Sprinkle and Beth Stephens, April 24 pgs 19-20.
- 2017 Stephens, Elizabeth and Annie Sprinkle. “Ecosex Manifesto,” “Sense and Sensuality,” special issue, CSPA Quarterly 17, 7-11.
- Owens, B.D., “Assuming the Ecosexual Position: by Beth Stephens and Annie Sprinkle, eco/art/Scotland (Feb 3, 22).
- Whitcomb, Isobel, Take the Earth on a Date: Inside the Ecosexual Movement, Sierra: the Magazine of the Sierra Club (Mar 5 2022).
- Kupper, Oliver, "The Earth as Lover," Autre Magazine, Issue #14 Spring/Summer 2022, Conversation between Annie Sprinkle, Beth Stephens and Kim TallBear Photography by Damien Maloney (Spring 2022).
- 2022 Wallace, Megan, Earth Day: Welcome to the world of eco-sex, Cosmopolitan Magazine, UK (Apr 22 2022).

=== Books ===
- 2021 Assuming the Ecosexual Position: The Earth as Lover with Annie Sprinkle, Jennie Klein, Una Chaudhuri, Paul B. Preciado, and Linda M. Montano. University of Minnesota Press.

=== Film/Video ===
- 1989 Women Eating
- 1989 Interviews with Oaxacan Women
- 1992 Do You Mind?
- 2004 Lüba; The Mother Teresa of Art
- 2005 Kiss
- 2006 Red Wedding One
- 2006 Orange Wedding Two
- 2006 Exposed; Experiments in Love, Sex, Death and Art
- 2007 Yellow Wedding Three
- 2007 Etant Donnees
- 2007 Big Nudes Descending a Staircase
- 2008 Green Wedding Four to the Earth
- 2009 Blue Wedding to the Sky/Sea Video
- 2010 Purple Wedding to the Appalachian Mountains
- 2011 Purple Wedding to the Moon, White Wedding to the Snow
- 2013 Goodbye Gauley Mountain: An Ecosexual Love Story
- 2017 Water Makes Us Wet: An Ecosexual Adventure
