= Annie Sprinkle =

American pornographic actress and sex educator (born 1954)

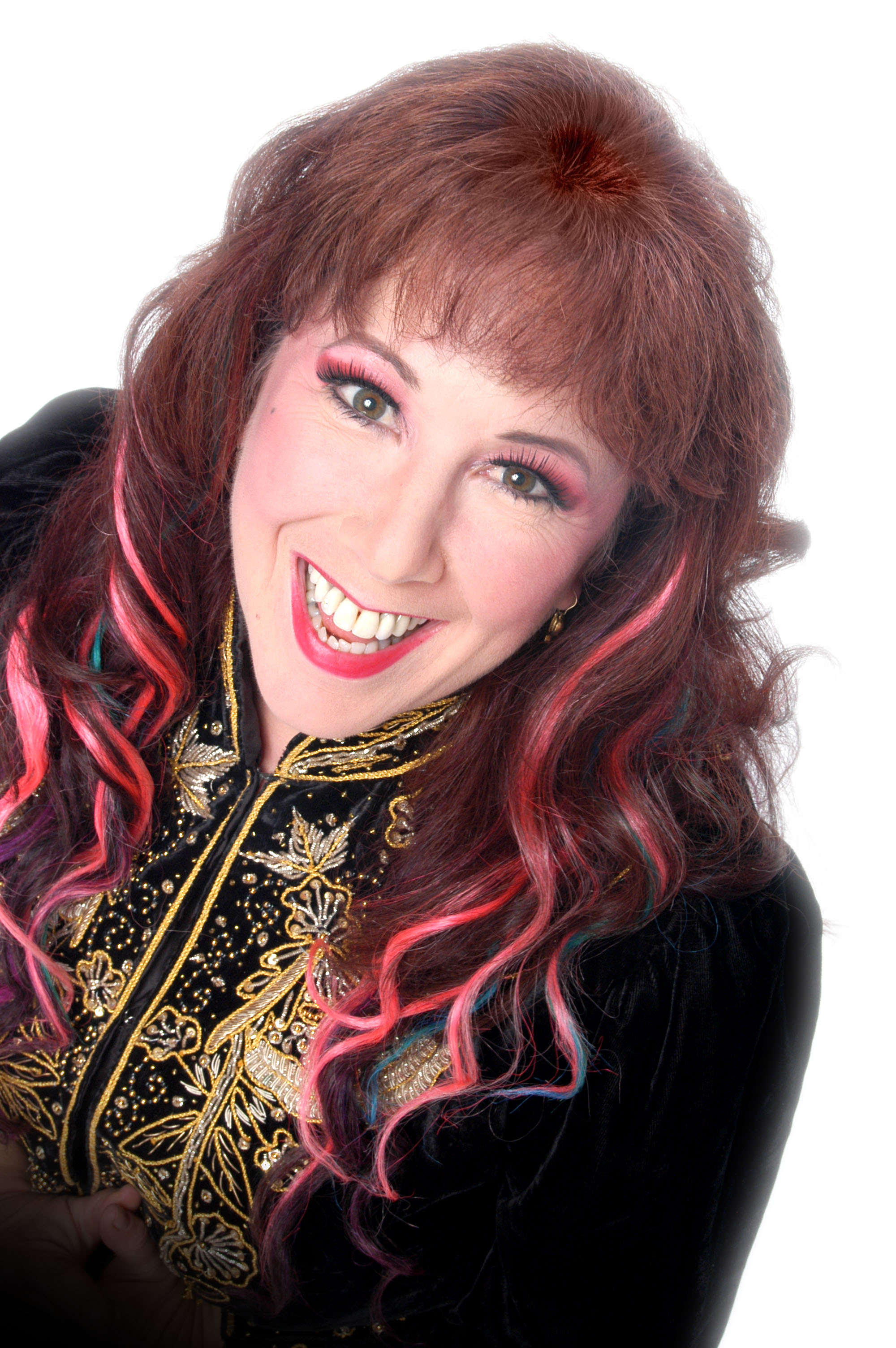
- Sprinkle in 2005
- Born: Ellen F. Steinberg; July 23, 1954 (age 72); Philadelphia, Pennsylvania, U.S.
- Occupations: Sexologist; performance artist; sex worker; filmmaker
- Spouse: Elizabeth Stephens (m. 2007)
- Website: sprinklestephens.org

Annie M. Sprinkle (born Ellen F. Steinberg on July 23, 1954) is an American certified sexologist, performance artist, former sex worker, filmmaker, and advocate for the decriminalization of sex work.

Sprinkle has worked as a prostitute, sex educator, feminist stripper, pornographic film actress, sex film producer and director, and documentary film director. She became known in the 1980s as a maker of feminist, lesbian, and sex-positive pornography. In 1996, Sprinkle became the first known porn star to get a doctoral degree, earning a Doctor of Philosophy in human sexuality from the Institute for Advanced Study of Human Sexuality in San Francisco.

Sprinkle, who identifies as ecosexual, is best known for her experimental pornography style, teaching individuals about pleasure, and for her mainstream pornographic film Deep Inside Annie Sprinkle (1981). She has also contributed to the rise of the post-porn movement. Sprinkle married her long-time partner Elizabeth Stephens in Canada on January 14, 2007.

== Life and career ==
Sprinkle was born Ellen F. Steinberg on July 23, 1954, in Philadelphia, Pennsylvania, to a Russian-Jewish mother and a Polish-Jewish father. Her family moved to Los Angeles, California, when she was five years old, and she lived in Panama City, Panama from age thirteen to seventeen. At eighteen, she began working at the ticket booth at the Cine-Plaza Theatre in Tucson, Arizona, when Deep Throat (1972) was playing. The film was busted, and when Steinberg had to appear in court as a witness, she met and began a relationship with Deep Throat's director, Gerard Damiano, becoming his mistress. She followed him to New York City, where she lived for twenty-two years.

Not long after becoming Damiano's mistress, Steinberg began working in porn herself and, at that time, started calling herself "Annie." As her career continued, she says that one night, "as if from the goddess herself," the name "Annie Sprinkle" came to her. She later changed her name legally to Annie Sprinkle. Her first porn movie was Teenage Deviate released in 1975. Perhaps her best known mainstream porn featured role was in Deep Inside Annie Sprinkle (co-directed by Sprinkle and sexploitation veteran Joseph W. Sarno) which was the No. 2 grossing porn film of 1981.

In 1992, Sprinkle and videographer Maria Beatty produced a humorous sex education video, The Sluts and Goddesses Video Workshop: Or How To Be A Sex Goddess in 101 Easy Steps. Sprinkle has also presented many sex workshops with fellow sex facilitator Barbara Carrellas, with whom she presented the stage production Metamorphosex.

Sprinkle has appeared in almost 200 films, including hard- and softcore pornography, B movies, loops, and numerous documentaries. She starred in Nick Zedd's experimental films War Is Menstrual Envy (1992), Ecstasy in Entropy (1999), and Electra Elf: The Beginning (2005). She also appeared in various television shows including four HBO Real Sex programs. She has also produced, directed, and starred in several of her own films, such as Annie Sprinkle's Herstory of Porn, Annie Sprinkle's Amazing World of Orgasm, and Linda/Les & Annie—The First Female to Male Transsexual Love Story. Her work in adult films earned her a spot on the Adult Star Path of Fame in Edison, New Jersey, and she was inducted to both the AVN Hall of Fame and the XRCO Hall of Fame in 1999. For three decades, she has presented her work as a visiting artist at many major universities and colleges in the US and Europe.

Annie Sprinkle is known as the "prostitute and porn star turned sex educator and artist." Her best known theater and performance art piece is her Public Cervix Announcement, in which she invites the audience to view her cervix with a speculum and flashlight. She also performed The Legend of the Ancient Sacred Prostitute, in which she did a "sex magic" masturbation ritual on stage. She has toured one-woman shows internationally for 17 years, some of which were titled Post Porn Modernist, Annie Sprinkle's Herstory of Porn, and Hardcore from the Heart. She then performed two-woman shows with Beth Stephens titled Exposed; Experiments in Love, Sex, Death and Art, Dirty Sex Ecology, Earthly: An Ecosex Bootcamp, and Ecosex Walking Tour.

Her work and publications, spanning over five decades, are studied in courses at numerous universities, in theater history, women's studies, performance studies, LGBTQ studies and film studies courses. Through The New School of Erotic Touch, she has released several video classes, including Female Genital Massage and Amazing World of Orgasm. Her most popular lecture was called "My Life and Work as a Feminist Porn Activist, Radical Sex Educator, and Ecosexual". She has also presented dozens of "Free Sidewalk Sex Clinics", offering free sex education to the public in public space.

Sprinkle's work has always been about sexuality, with a political, spiritual and artistic bent. In December 2005, she committed to doing a seven year long art project about love with her art collaborator and eventual wife, Beth Stephens. They called this their Love Art Laboratory. Part of their project was to do an experimental art wedding each year, and each year had a different theme and color. The seven-year structure was adapted to their project by invitation of artist Linda M. Montano. Sprinkle and Stephens have done twenty-one art weddings, eighteen with ecosexual themes. They married the Earth, Sky, Sea, Moon, Appalachian Mountains, the Sun, and other non-human entities in nine different countries including at Montreal's Edgy Women Festival in 2011.

She was featured in Maya Gallus's 1997 documentary film Erotica: A Journey Into Female Sexuality.

Sprinkle and her partner Beth Stephens became pioneers of ecosexuality, a kind of earth-loving sexual identity, which states, "The Earth is our lover". Their Ecosex Manifesto proclaims that anyone can identify as an ecosexual along with being "GLBTQI, heterosexual, asexual, and/or Other."

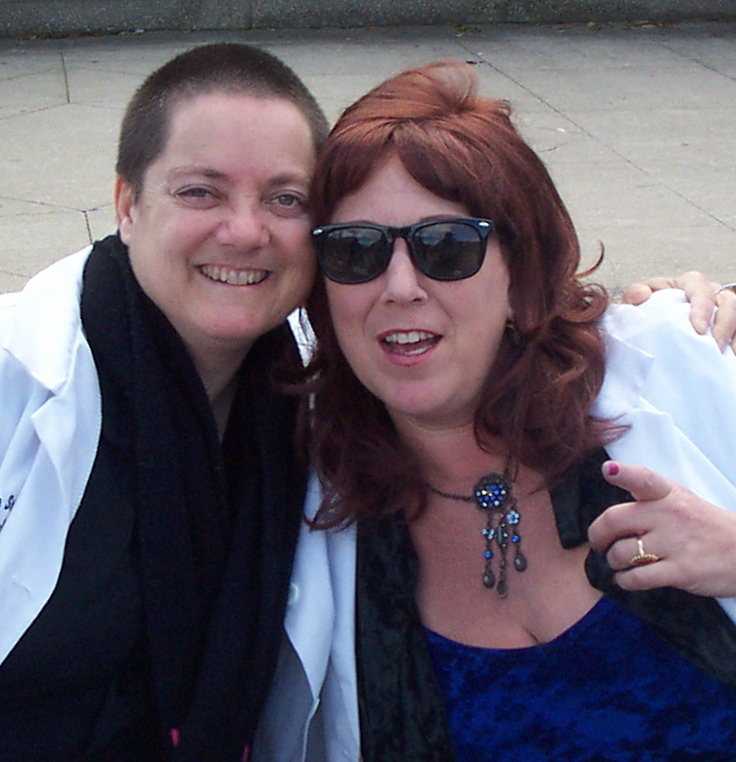
Sprinkle (right) with Beth Stephens in 2006

Sprinkle identifies as a sex-positive feminist, and much of her activist and sex education work reflects this philosophy. In 2009, she appeared in the French documentary film Mutantes: Punk, Porn, Feminism, speaking about the beginnings of the movement as well as her own contributions to it.

In 2017, Sprinkle and Stephens were official artists in Documenta 14. They presented performances and visual art, lectured, and previewed their new film documentary, Water Makes Us Wet: An Ecosexual Adventure.

Harvard's Schlesinger Library acquired her papers from 1967 to 2010, including those covering work with her partner Elizabeth Stephens.

== Feminism and environmental activism ==
Sprinkle is known as a contributor to the development of pornography that intends to be feminist and is known for her disagreement with women against pornography, feminists who do not believe that the creation of feminist porn is possible and argue that porn is a means of hyper sexualization of women, that it is inherently harmful, promotes violence, and objectifies women. In contrast Sprinkle is known for arguing that women should contribute to the production of pornography or other erotic media and that censorship or restrictions on pornography will not cease its production.

As a porn actress, Sprinkle drew greater attention to the female orgasm. A stated aim of her performance art and other works has been to expand and deconstruct mainstream ideals of sexuality.

Sprinkle and her wife Beth Stephens are known for promoting a combination of environmental activism and sexuality called ecosexuality, and launching the ecosex movement with their Ecosex Manifesto. They state ecosexuality involves imagining nature as a lover. Ecosexuality combines sexuality and ecology and opposes sexual dynamics of dominance and exploitation, placing it adjacent to ecofeminism, which highlights how women and nature are treated similarly in a patriarchal society.

== Post-porn movement ==
Annie Sprinkle coined the term "post-porn" to describe sexually explicit media that is experimental, conceptual, humorous, feminist, artsy, punk, and outside of mainstream porn aesthetics.

In her one-woman touring show "Post-Porn Modernist" (1989–95), she performed Public Cervix Announcement, Sprinkle inserted a speculum into her vaginal canal to display her cervix to the audience in a playful, satirical celebration of the female body. Sprinkle has characterized her own art involving erotic and explicit imagery of the vulva and internal female anatomy as feminist activism. Sprinkle continued this medical discourse later in her career as well. After receiving her breast cancer diagnosis in 2005, Sprinkle made a collage with her radiation treatment plans, surgery photos, and old pin-up photos, juxtaposing the erotic breast with the medicalized breast.

The post-porn movement is a countercultural body of scholarship and ideals that were developed within Europe and the USA. Within the post-porn movement there is a critical lens applied to corporations producing pornography and non-corporate pornographic content is instead valued. The post-porn movement also values the production of pornography which centers queer and gender diverse folks and questions the racialization and reliance on stereotypes found in the pornography industry. Sprinkle has contributed to the post-porn movement through her artistic body of work which engages in critical reflection and parody. Sprinkle has also contributed to this movement by challenging who can be represented in porn and which bodies are seen as sexual.

== Awards ==
- 2026: with Beth Stephens Lifetime Achievement Award, Pornfilmfestival Berlin

== Publications ==
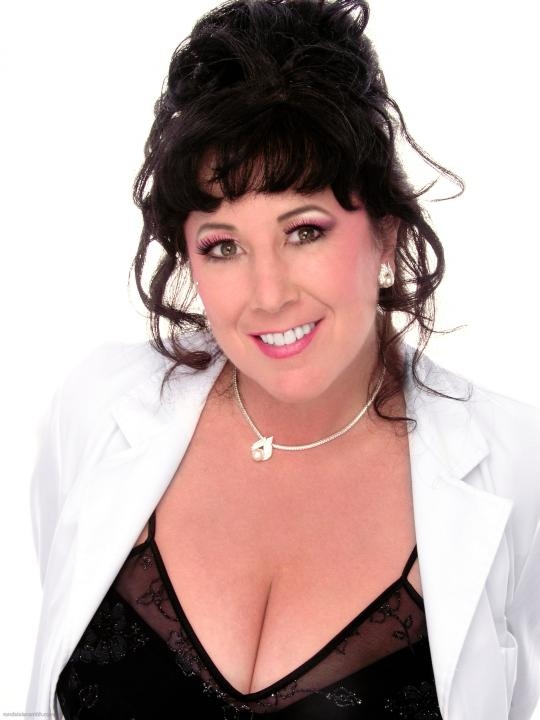
Sprinkle as pictured on the cover of her book Spectacular Sex (2005)

- Annie Sprinkle and Beth Stephens with Jennie Klein, 2021. Assuming the Ecosexual Position: The Earth as Lover. Minneapolis, MN: University of Minnesota Press.
- With Vera, V.; De Ridder, W. (1985). Annie Sprinkles ABC Study of Sexual Lust and Deviations. New York: Radio Art Publications. OCLC 80467203.
- The Kinky World of Annie Sprinkle. New York: Hudson Communications. 1985.
- Hutchins, Loraine; Kaahumanu, Lani (March 2, 1991). Beyond Bisexual. Alyson Pub. ISBN 978-1-55583-174-5 (1991). In Hutchins, L.; Kaahumanu, L. (eds.). Bi Any Other Name: Bisexual People Speak Out. Boston: Alyson Publications. pp. 103–107. ISBN 978-1-55583-174-5 – via the Internet Archive.
- With Gates, K. (1995). Annie Sprinkle's Post-Modern Pin-Ups: Pleasure Activist Playing Cards. Richmond, Va.: Gates of Heck. ISBN 978-0-9638129-3-3.
- アニー・スプリンクルの愛のヴァイブレーション [Annie Sprinkle's Love Vibrations] (in Japanese). Tokyo: Kawade Shobo Shinsha. 1996. ISBN 978-4-309-26284-0.
- With Gates, K.; Adams, C. (1997). XXXOOO: Love and Kisses from Annie Sprinkle (30 Post-Porn Postcards). New York: Gates of Heck. ISBN 978-1-889539-00-3.
- "We've Come a Long Way—And We're Exhausted!". March 2, 1997 (1997). In Nagle, Jill (ed.). Whores and Other Feminists. New York: Routledge. pp. 66–69. ISBN 978-0-415-91822-0 – via the Internet Archive.
- Annie Sprinkle [Post-Porn Modernist: My 25 Years as a Multi-Media Whore]. San Francisco: Cleis Press. 1998. ISBN 978-1-57344-039-4.
- With Cody, Gabrielle H. (2001). Hardcore from the Heart: The Pleasures, Profits and Politics of Sex in Performance. London: Continuum. ISBN 978-0-8264-4893-4. — winner of a 2002 Firecracker Alternative Book Award
- "Contributor". In: Webb, Spider (2001). Tattooed Women. Atglen, Penn.: Schiffer Publishing. ISBN 978-0-7643-1540-4.
- Dr. Sprinkle's Spectacular Sex: Make Over Your Love Life with One of the World's Great Sex Experts. New York: Jeremy P. Tarcher/Penguin. 2005. ISBN 978-1-58542-412-2.
- With Jong, Ellen (2006). Pees on Earth. New York: PowerHouse Books. ISBN 978-1-5768-7317-5.
- "Foreword" (2007). In: Carrellas, Barbara (January 2007). Urban Tantra: Sacred Sex for the Twenty-First Century. Berkeley, Calif.: Celestial Arts. ISBN 978-1-58761-290-9.
- "Foreword" (2014). In: Sundahl, Deborah (November 21, 2023). Female Ejaculation and the G-Spot: Not Your Mother's Orgasm Book! (revised 2nd ed.). Nashville, Tenn.: Hunter House Publishers. ISBN 978-0-89793-702-3..
- With Stephens, Beth (2017). Laimer, Quinn; Symczyk, Adam (eds.). Documenta 14: Daybook: Athens, 8 April-Kassel, 17 September 2017. Munich: Prestel Verlag. pp. 19–20. ISBN 978-3-7913-5655-6.
- With Stephens, Beth (2017). Explorer's Guide to Planet Orgasm: For Every Body. Illustrated by Yu Dori. Greenery Press. ISBN 978-0-937609-85-9.

== Filmography ==
Film and TV credits
Year	Title	Role	Notes
1975	Blow Some My Way	B.J.	
1975	Sue Prentiss R.N.	First Nurse	uncredited
1975	My Master My Love	Margaret's Brunette Client	credited as Annie Sands
1975	The American Andventures of Surelick Holmes	Stewardess	uncredited
1975	Teenage Masseuse		credited as Annie Sprinkles
1975	Kathy's Graduation Present	Anita	uncredited
1975	Sherlick Holmes		
1975	Too Hot to Handle	Ellen	credited as Annie Sands
1975	French Shampoo (Homage to W. B.)	Little Mary	
1975	Wild Pussycats		
1975	Satan Was a Lady	Terry	Directed by Doris Wishman; credited as Anny Sands
1975	Fanny	June	uncredited
1976	Pornocopia Sensual	Susan	
1976	Honey Pie	Blow Job Annie	credited as Anne Sprinkle
1976	Teenage Deviate	Ella	credited as Annie Sprinkles
1976	Ecstasy in Blue	Hentai	
1976	Expose Me, Lovely	Robin	credited as Annie Sprinkles
1976	M*A*S*H'd	Gail	
1976	Once Over Nightly		
1976	Teenage Cover Girls	Anne Sands	credited as Anne Sands
1976	The Night of Submission	Editor's Mistress	
1976	Seduction	Girl at bridge party No. 1	
1976	My Erotic Fantasies	Russian Porn Actress	
1976	Bang Bang You Got It!	Rhoda Thomas	
1976	Slippery When Wet	Stella Wilkins	credited as Annie Sprinkles
1976	The Double Exposure of Holly	Muff	credited as Annie Sprinkles
1976	Call Me Angel, Sir	Tracy Dixon	
1976	The Affairs of Janice	Susan	uncredited
1976	Come with Me My Love	Tess Albertino	
1976	Funk		
1976	Wet-X-Mas		
1977	The Devil Inside Her	Orgy Girl	credited as Annie Sprinkles
1977	Cherry Hustlers	Sprink	uncredited
1977	Unwilling Lovers	Hooker with Stole	credited as Annie Sprinkles
1978	The Ganja Express	Sherry Herring	
1979	Jack n' Jill	First Caller	
1979	For Richer for Poorer	Party Guest	uncredited
1980	The Satisfiers of Alpha Blue	Satisfier	
1980	Midnight Blue 2		
1981	Deep Inside Annie Sprinkle		
1981	Twilite Pink	Prostitute	credited as Annie Sprinkles
1981	Centerfold Fever	Annie	
1981	Pandora's Mirror	The Queen of the club	credited as Miss Annie Sprinkle
1981	Bizarre Styles	Annie	
1982	Night on the Town		
1983	Oriental Techniques in Pain and Pleasure	Annie	credited as Annie Sprinkles
1983	Kneel Before Me	Wife / Justine	credited as Annie Sprinkles
1983	Big Busty 3 (Video)		
1984	Throat... 12 Years After	The Sewer Mother	
1984	Electric Blue 12 (Video)	Shelly	
1985	Spitfire	Lulu	
1986	Wimps (Video)	Head Stripper	
1986	Sweet Revenge		
1987	The Lingerie Shop		
1987	She-Male Encounters 5: Orgy at the Poysinberry Bar		
1987	She Comes in Colors		
1987	Rites of Passion		
1988	Tattoo Vampire (Video)		
1988	The Horneymooners (Video)	Jane Norris	
1988	Hotter Than July		
1988	Dreams of Desire		
1988	Bazooka County (Video)		
1989	Young Nurses in Love	Twin Falls	
1990	The Golden Boat	Waitress	
1990	Fantasy Salon		
1991	My Father Is Coming	Annie	Directed by Monika Treut
1991	Shadows in the City	Ex-Girlfriend	Directed by Ari Roussimoff
1991	Mature Women 2 (Video)		
1992	25 Year Old Gay Man Loses His Virginity to a Woman	Self	Directed by Philip B. Roth
1992	Linda/Les and Annie	Self	Directed by Johnny Armstrong, Albert Jaccoma, Annie Sprinkle
1992	War Is Menstrual Envy		
1992	Pinned and Smothered (Video)		
1996	Bubbles Galore	God	
1997	The Fanny (Video)		
1999	Ecstasy in Entropy (Short)		
2005	The Keep (Short)		
2005	Electra Elf: The Beginning Parts One & Two		
2005	H.C.E.	Various	
2009	Mutantes: Punk, Porn, Feminism		
2011	Kenny Hotz's Triumph of the Will	Self	Episode 4
2012	Lesbian Sex Education: Female Ejaculation (Video)		
2013	Goodbye Gauley Mountain: an Ecosexual Love Story (Video)		
2017	Water Makes Us Wet: An Ecosexual Adventure	Lead, Director	
2025	Playing with Fire: An Ecosexual Emergency	Director, Producer, Actor	

== See also ==
- Nina Hartley
- International Day to End Violence Against Sex Workers
- Mineshaft (gay club)
- Same-sex marriage in Canada
