= Sexecology =

Activism based around ecofetishism

Sexecology, also known as ecosexuality, is a radical form of environmental activism based around nature fetishism, the idea of the earth as a lover. It invites people to treat the earth with love rather than see it as an infinite resource to exploit. It was founded by Elizabeth Stephens and Annie Sprinkle, who describe themselves as "two ecosexual artists-in-love", whose manifesto is to make environment activism "more sexy, fun, and diverse". Sexecology employs absurdist humor, performance art and sex-positivity, which Stephens claims "may produce new forms of knowledge that hold potential to alter the future by privileging our desire for the Earth to function with as many diverse, intact and flourishing ecological systems as possible." The couple promote education, events such as the ecosex symposium, and activism, such as protecting the Appalachian Mountains from mountain top removal.

== Difference from ecofeminism ==
Sexecology conceives of the earth not as a mother but as a lover. This conceptual shift invites people to engage their bodies and senses in acts of environmental preservation.

Unlike ecofeminism, sexecology does not see an intrinsic link between women and nature; some of the limitations of ecofeminism which sex ecology indirectly addresses are "the reliance on women's biological functions to establish a connection between women and nature, the uncritical over-privileging of women's experiences, the inappropriateness of designating ideal female characteristics, and the regressive political implications of associating women with nature". "The formulation of an Eco-Sexual identity is a practice of an erotic eco-logic, deconstructing heteronormative constructions of gender, sex, sexuality, and nature in order to continually queer and destabilize identities, actively form and retain spaces of lack that necessitate interdependency, and engage a permeable sensuous self in perpetual sensorial reciprocity with the sensing and sensible more-than-human environment. It is an identity identified by desire rather than a stable essence or being, and it is a desire for the more-than-human environment in which the human subject is sensorially implicit."

== Ecosexuals ==
Proponents of this movement are called "ecosexuals"; they are unafraid to engage in and embrace their erotic experience with the earth, such as bathing naked, having sex with vegetables or having an orgasm in a waterfall. Stephens describes ecosexuals as people who "... are related to cyborgs and are not afraid of engaging in intercourse with nature and/or with technology for that matter. We make love with the Earth through our senses."

Ecosexuals range from those who use sustainable sex products and like being nude in nature to those who "roll around in the dirt having an orgasm covered in potting soil" and those who "masturbate under a waterfall" "[Sprinkle and Stephens] have officiated wedding ceremonies where they and fellow ecosexuals marry the earth, the moon, and other natural entities." They have also stated that they believe there are over 100,000 people who identify as ecosexual worldwide.

== Human/nonhuman relationships ==
Sexecology seeks to direct attention towards “the ways in which sex and sexuality affect the larger nonhuman world.” Ecosexuality is an orientation directed toward the non-human material world. With this direction, ecosexuality makes the statement that “these human bodies are part of the nonhuman material world.” The blur between human and non-human entities is essential to Sprinkle and Stephens’ demonstration of sexecology.

Sexecology was influenced by contemporary theories around posthumanism and the relationships between humans and nonhumans.

Elizabeth Stephens has said "Haraway’s work has guided my understanding of the material consequences and the theoretical underpinnings embedded in human/nonhuman relationships that matrix our world. This has helped me understand how human exceptionalism has been constructed and privileged throughout the history of religion and science as well as in other secular practices in western culture. Human exceptionalism, in collaboration with global capitalism, has created the isolated space necessary for the ongoing practices that have produced the dangerously degraded environmental conditions in which we now live. The belief systems and ideologies that allow some people to think that they have the Darwinian survival skill and the rights that accompany those skills to use or destroy other human and non humans is now causing the kind of environmental degradation that affects the whole system sooner or later."

== Performances and workshops ==
“The Love Art Lab projects aim to instill hope, create an antidote to fear, and act as a call for action.” It is a private demonstration into the work of the two founders of the movement, Sprinkle and Stephens, as the research how to become "lovers with the earth. The performances can be privately booked by contacting the two and are meant to be demonstrational, informative, and "radical."

Sprinkle and Stephens have performed a number of "weddings to the earth" across the world intended to break the barrier between human sexuality and nature. The performances include "Wedding to the Dirt, Wedding to Lake Kallavesi, Wedding to the Coal, Wedding to the Rocks, Wedding to the Snow, Wedding to the Moon, Wedding to the Appalachian Mountains, Wedding to the Earth, and Wedding to the Sea", to date. The intention, according to Sprinkles, is to "shift the metaphor from ‘Earth as Mother’ to ‘Earth as Lover´"

Sprinkle and Stephens have performed a two-women show 25 Ways to Make Love to the Earth (Theatre Piece) at the Kosmos Theatre in Vienna in 2010 to demonstrate how to "make love with the earth", including talking, singing, dancing, and stroking natural objects. The performances are educational as well as self-promoting of the movement.

The aesthetic strategies of sexecology are influenced by Joseph Beuys' concept of social sculpture, which sees art as having the potential to transform society.

"... the production of visible art may effect the production of invisible ideological and class relations. For Joseph Beuys, sculpture and artistic creativity hold the potential to reshape the educational and governmental institutions that produce ideological subjects, as well as social, political, and economic systems. Art, Beuys argues, is the necessary condition for the production of a revolutionary society because it can both unravel the old order and engage everyone in the production of a new social order."

Ecosexuals have engaged in protests against mountaintop removal, as shown in the film Goodbye Gauley Mountain: An Ecosexual Love Story.

=== Goodbye Gauley Mountain: An Ecosexual Love Story (film) ===
Goodbye Gauley Mountain: An Ecosexual Love Story (2013) is an autoethnographic documentary film by Elizabeth Stephens with Annie Sprinkle about the environmental issue of mountaintop removal in West Virginia, United States. West Virginia native Stephens returns to her childhood home to create a film that incorporates autobiography, a brief history of the coal industry, an inventory of activist strategies, an eco-sexual mini-manifesto, and finally, an example of the performance art Stephens and Sprinkle often employ to express their ecosexuality. Stephens presents a community struggling to reconcile their love of their natural mountainous environment with the fact that its destruction via MTR provides the local economy. The piece explores the negative consequences of mountaintop removal, both cosmetic and environmental, and culminates in an exploration of ecosexuality, followed by wedding ceremony in which Stephens and Sprinkle "marry" the mountain. “Ecosexuality inserts an ‘erotic’ humor that plays against the horrific subject matter. So far the feedback that I’ve received at film previews makes me realize that these are effective strategies for creating space to briefly cut the feeling of despair that MTR evokes.”

== See also ==
- A Cyborg Manifesto
- Alter-globalization
- Posthumanism
- New materialism
- Fuck for Forest
- Positive environmentalism
- List of earth deities
- Mother Nature
- Goddess movement
- Theatre of the Oppressed

== Bibliography ==
- Stefanie Iris Weiss. Eco-Sex: Go Green Between the Sheets and Make Your Love Life Sustainable. Paperback. 224 pages, publisher: Ten Speed Press (March 30, 2010) ISBN 1580081185
