= Carriage Room =

Defunct strip club and restaurant in Portland, Oregon, US

- Location in Portland, Oregon
- Address: 1000 Southwest Broadway
- Location: Portland, Oregon, U.S.
- Coordinates: 45.51716°N 122.68057°W
- Owner: Roy Keller
- Type: Strip club; bar; restaurant

Construction
- Closed: 1988
- Demolished: 1988

The Carriage Room was a strip club in Portland, Oregon, United States. The bar and restaurant closed in 1988.

== Description and history ==
The bar and restaurant operated for eighteen years at 1000 Southwest Broadway, underneath the Broadway Theatre, in downtown Portland. The club was one of seven owned by Roy Keller (three were in Portland and four were in Sacramento, California; only Carriage Room and Mary's Club were strip clubs). Carriage Room also hosted comedy acts as performances. Sammy Davis Jr. and Mort Sahl performed at the venue.

In 1969, commenting on the public debate of topless dancing, Carriage Room owner Dave Russell told The Oregonian: "What we're aiming at here is sort of the Las Vegas lounge show... We don't believe a show has to be topless to make money, but we have to compete with other clubs, and they have to serve what the customer wants." The newspaper said Carriage Room performers were not allowed to mingle with or accept drinks from patrons, or date male colleagues. In 1971, Lottie D. Freeman, who performed at the club as "Casey Champagne", challenged Portland's ban on bottomless dancing, claiming the restriction violated First Amendment protections of freedom of expressions. However, circuit judge William M. Dale upheld the ordinance, ending a temporary injunction preventing officers from enforcing the ban for eight days. In 1976, a fire caused $7,500 damage, impacted nearby traffic, and threw smoke into the Broadway Theatre. Mostly the kitchen was damaged, but the restaurant was forced to close for several days.

Comedian Wallace "Wally" Blair Woolstencroft served as master of ceremonies at the Carriage Room from the late 1960s to mid 1970s. In 1980, The Oregonian's described the bar as a space where "X-rated entertainment rules the roost". Royce Looby Tomkin, once manager of Carriage Room and Mary's Club, died in 1984. Irene E. Pattison served as a waitress at Carriage Room for 32 years, starting in 1954. She managed the restaurant for eighteen years, before retiring in 1984. Vickie Anderson was a manager of Carriage Room and Mary's Club, as of 1984. During mid 1984, Carriage Room dancers reportedly "cruised the harbor on a motor launch, revealing their charms to the sailors" arriving for Fleet Week, as part of the Portland Rose Festival.

In 1985, Jonathan Nicholas of The Oregonian described the club as "Portland's most venerable pleasure palace". Furthermore, he wrote:

The Carriage Room was once the home of Portland's last burlesque show, a place where the dancers still wore feathers and sequins and put on something more (a show) than they took off. But the '80s have invaded the Carriage Room with a vengeance. Today the women take to the stage as if they're at aerobics classes at the 'Y.' Their moves owe more to Jane Fonda than to Gypsy Rose Lee. And at the end of each number, they lounge on stage looking like puppets on which someone has just cut the strings. Then the scratchy music cranks up again, and they resume their relentless, listless homage to men's vanity and six bucks an hour."

Carriage Room closed in 1988 when the theatre was demolished, and Keller changed his focus to Carmen's Restaurant and Carriage Room Lounge in northeast Portland.

In 2008, The Portland Mercury published a retrospective article called "Best of Portland 1988", which briefly profiled a dancer who performed at Carriage Room and Mary's Club. According to the newspaper, the women at Carriage Room were "more cabaret performers than strippers, taking the stage to perform (to a soundtrack on cassette tapes) in dramatic evening gowns, with less emphasis on getting undressed".

== See also ==
- Culture of Portland, Oregon
- List of strip clubs
