= Legal status of striptease =

The legal status of striptease varies considerably among different countries and various jurisdictions. Striptease is considered a form of public nudity and subject to changing legal and cultural attitudes on moral and decency grounds. Some countries do not have any restrictions on performances of striptease.

In some countries, public nudity is outlawed directly, while in other countries it may be suppressed or regulated indirectly through devices such as restrictions on venues through planning laws, or licensing regulations, or liquor licensing and other restrictions. Health and safety regulations may prohibit full nudity depending on the venue.

== National issues ==
=== Canada ===
There have been annual attempts to amend the Canadian Immigration and Refugee Protection Act (IRPA), passed in 2001. The 2009 version of the bill (Bill C-45: An Act to amend the Immigration and Refugee Protection Act) had specific provisions related to tightening the issuance of Exotic Dancer Visas as a means to combat human trafficking. In addition to Canada, the Irish and Japanese governments had at one time special visa categories for 'entertainers' which enabled the trafficking of women for strip clubs and prostitution.

=== Cyprus ===
The former immigration chief in Cyprus was found guilty in 2001 of accepting bribes to issue work permits to foreign women (from Ukraine) who worked as strippers in clubs, some of whom were forced into prostitution.

=== Iceland ===
In March 2010, Iceland outlawed striptease under a law made by the Icelandic Parliament (Alþingi). It is now an offence for any business to profit from the nudity of its employees. No other European country has subsequently implemented a strip club ban. Strip clubs and nudity among their employees remains legal in most of Europe.

Around 15 strip clubs had been operating in Iceland in the late 1990s and early 2000s, mostly in and around Reykjavík, and stripping was a multimillion-dollar business. At that time nude dancing was regulated and stripping was generally considered to be illegal, although a small number of clubs had been given a legal exemption to feature striptease. Those exemptions were rescinded when the ban officially took effect on 31 July 2010 and Iceland's strip clubs all closed. A few "champagne clubs" subsequently opened in an old strip club district, providing a private area in the back where clients could purchase private time with a female worker. In 2015, a women's crisis center, Stígamót, campaigned against these clubs and accused them of trafficking and prostitution. The clubs were subsequently raided by the police and closed.

Siv Friðleifsdóttir of the Progressive Party was the first presenter of the bill. Kolbrún Halldórsdóttir, the politician behind the bill, was concerned about alleged links with drugs and prostitution. She was also of the opinion that strip clubs violated women's rights. She said: "It is not acceptable that women or people in general are a product to be sold". Jóhanna Sigurðardóttir, then Iceland's Prime Minister, said: "The Nordic countries are leading the way on women's equality, recognizing women as equal citizens rather than commodities for sale". Another politician, Steinunn Valdís Óskarsdóttir, spoke in support of the ban, saying: "Women who work at strip clubs are in many cases the victims of human trafficking and other kinds of abuse" and "I have been working in this field for almost 15 years and not yet have I met one woman who dances at strip clubs because she wants to". Club operators dispute the notion that strippers are unwilling victims. They argue that Icelandic police have found no evidence of organised crime or prostitution at their clubs.

The decision to pass the law was seen as a victory for anti-pornography feminists, and criticized by sex-positive feminists. In 2015 Stígamót made a presentation on the results of their activities in Iceland at a sideline event of the U.N. Commission on the Status of Women.

=== United Kingdom ===
In the 1930s, when the Windmill Theatre, London, began to present nude shows, British law prohibited performers moving whilst in a state of nudity. To get around that rule, models appeared naked in stationary tableaux vivants. To keep within the law, sometimes devices were used which rotated the models without them moving themselves. Fan dances were another device used to keep performances within the law. These allowed a naked dancer's body to be concealed by her fans or those of her attendants, until the end of an act, when she posed naked for a brief interval whilst standing stock still, and the lights went out or the curtain dropped to allow her to leave the stage. The Lord Chamberlain's rules prohibiting moving nude dancers did not apply to private members club, a loophole exploited by the “Raymond Revuebar” in Soho, London at the start of the 1960s. Changes in the law in that decade brought about a boom of strip clubs in Soho, with "fully nude" dancing and audience participation.

A 2003 United Kingdom study reported statistics which said that in the London Borough of Camden the number of rapes increased by 50% and indecent assaults by 57% after four lap dancing venues opened. According to the Lilith Report on Lap Dancing and Striptease in the Borough of Camden, these statistics were calculated from information published by the Metropolitan police relating to the years 1998-99 and 2001–02. The percentages however were incorrectly calculated and Metropolitan police provided the UK Guardian newspaper with the following figures: 72 rapes and 162 indecent assaults in the borough in 1998–99, and 96 rapes and 251 indecent assaults in 2001–02; a 33% increase in rape and a 55% increase in indecent assault. The overall crime rate decreased over the same period. However, in 2011 Brooke Magnanti published a statistical re-analysis criticizing the Lilith report for its lack of incidence rate calculation, lack of control population, and using results from too short of a time period.

The authors of Government Regulation of "Adult" Businesses Through Zoning and Anti-Nudity Ordinances: Debunking the Legal Myth of Negative Secondary Effects, a meta-analysis of 110 studies looking at the impact of strip clubs and other adult businesses, have concluded that the studies that favored prohibiting exotic dancing suffered from research flaws, and that in the papers that did not contain fatal flaws, there was no correlation between adult-oriented business and any crime. Ethnographic work also supports the conclusion that there is no relationship between adult entertainment and crime.

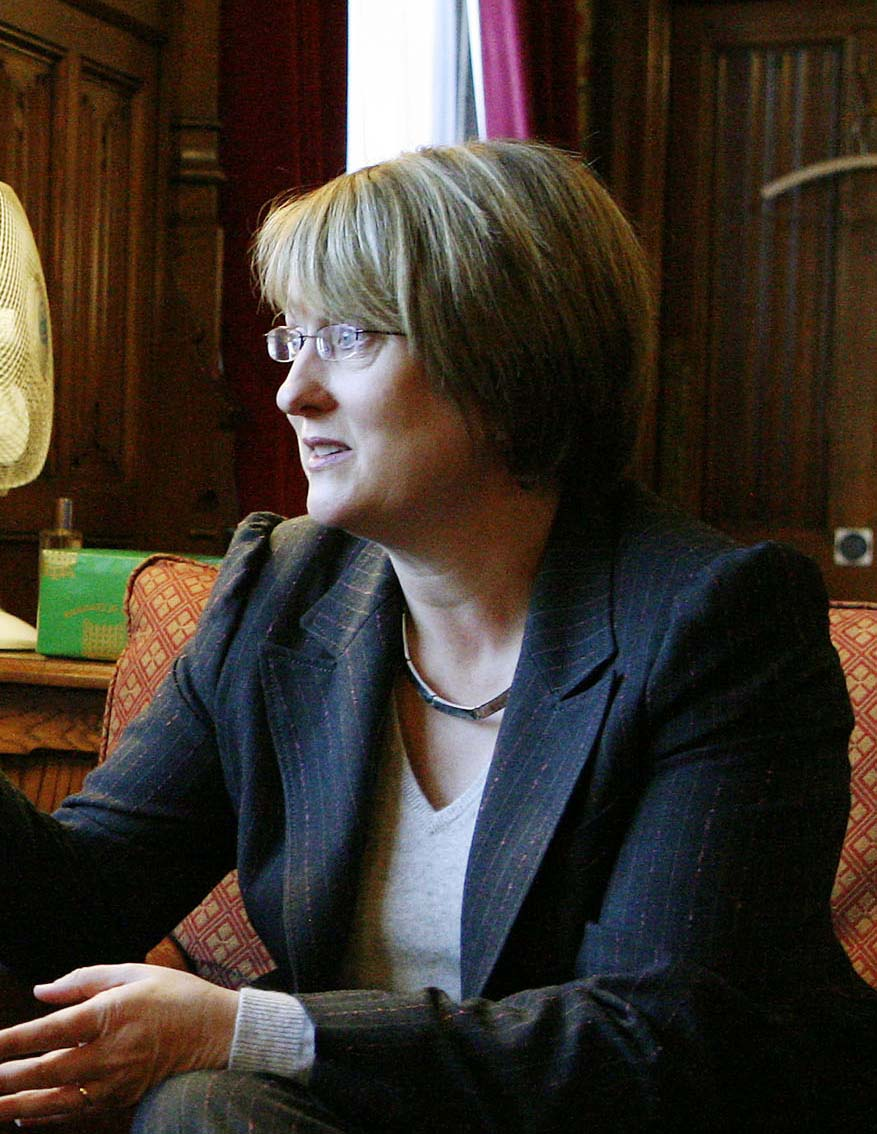
Jacqui Smith introduced the Policing and Crime Act 2009 into the British House of Commons.

During the 21st century the legislative trend in the UK has been toward a more conservative treatment of striptease, in contrast to many areas in Europe and the US which have more liberal sexual attitudes. In 2009, the United Kingdom passed the Policing and Crime Act following government concerns about an increase in the number of striptease venues in the country. The act defines "sexual entertainment venues" as those venues in England & Wales (and later Scotland) which have been licensed for the performance of nudity for profit where the primary intention of the entertainment is sexual gratification or titillation. Most of the venues licensed in this way are lap dance or gentleman's clubs specialising in female striptease for an assumed male audience, but some offer more general sexual entertainment, burlesque, or male striptease. Any strip club where live entertainment takes place more than 11 times a year must now apply for a license from its local authorities. Such clubs are routinely opposed by those who feel that these 'lower the tone' of particular neighbourhoods, and the introduction of licensing legislation under the 2009 Policing and Crime Act (in England and Wales) and the 2015 Air Weapons and Licensing Act (Scotland) has reduced the number of relevant premises to fewer than 200 across the UK, significantly down on the 350 or so existing in the early 2000s. The reasons for licence refusal vary, but usually it is on grounds of the club being in an inappropriate locality.

The London Borough of Hackney council used the Act to introduce a "nil" policy on adult entertainment in early 2011. However, the council's own consultation found that over 75% of the people in Shoreditch (where most of Hackney's existing clubs were located) opposed the ban. Police noted that crime and antisocial behaviour around the existing clubs was extremely low compared to late-night bars. Trade unions estimated that up to 450 jobs could be lost and the TUC argued that dancers who worked in the existing establishments should be better protected instead.

=== United States ===
Many U.S. jurisdictions have various laws related to striptease, public nudity and related issues. For example, the "six foot rule" in some jurisdictions requires strippers to maintain a six-foot distance from customers while performing topless or nude. This rule does not apply when in a bikini or other work outfit, but is indicative of the level of scrutiny prevailing in some jurisdictions on dancer-customer interaction. Other rules forbid "full nudity". In some parts of the United States, laws forbid exposure of female nipples, but does not apply if a stripper wears pasties.

==== Social attitudes ====
A relatively liberal social climate keeps many jurisdictions in the United States from passing stricter legislation against strip clubs, or from enforcing it fully. However, in recent years, many cities, such as New York City and San Francisco, have enacted ordinances prohibiting "adult entertainment" businesses from within a certain distance of houses, schools and churches, and perhaps each other. Often, a distance of nearly half-a-mile is stipulated, which ensure that new strip clubs can not open in many major cities. Courts have generally upheld these zoning laws.

==== Decency regulations ====
Many United States jurisdictions have laws pertaining to striptease or public nudity. In some parts of the United States, laws forbid exposure of female nipples, but does not apply if a stripper wears pasties. In early 2010, the city of Detroit banned fully exposed breasts in its strip clubs, following the example of Houston which began enforcing a similar ordinance of 2008. The city council has since softened the rules eliminating the requirement for pasties but kept other restrictions.

==== Topless and fully nude clubs ====
In several parts of the United States, local laws classify strip clubs as either topless or all/fully nude. Dancers in topless clubs can expose their breasts, but not their genitals. Topless dancers typically perform in a G-string and, depending on local laws, may be required to wear pasties covering their nipples. Fully nude clubs may be subject to additional requirements such as restrictions on alcohol sales or no-touch rules between customers and dancers.

To get around these rules two "separate" bars—one topless and one fully nude—may open adjacent to one another. In a small number of states and jurisdictions, where it is legal for alcohol to be consumed but not for alcohol to be sold, some clubs allow customers to bring their own beverages. These are known as BYOB clubs.

==== Independent contractors ====
In the U.S., striptease dancers are generally classified as independent contractors. While a few smaller strip clubs may pay a weekly wage, for the most part all of a dancer's income is derived from tips and other fees they collect from customers. In most clubs, dancers have to pay a "stage fee" or "house fee" to work a given shift. In addition, most clubs take a percentage of each private dance. It is customary—and often required in the United States—for dancers to also pay a "tip out", which is money (either a set fee or a percentage of money earned) paid to staff members of clubs, such as DJs, house moms, make-up artists, servers, bartenders, and bouncers, at the end of their shift.

==== Touching of strippers ====
In many states it is illegal for customers to touch strippers. However, some dancers and some clubs condone the touching of dancers during private dances. This touching often includes the fondling of breasts, buttocks, and in rare cases, vulvae. In some locales, dancers may give a customer a "lap dance", whereby the dancer grinds against a fully clothed customer's crotch in an attempt to arouse them.

One of the more specific and strict local ordinances is San Diego Municipal Code 33.3610, created in response to allegations of corruption among local officials involving contacts in the nude entertainment industry. Among its provisions is the "six foot rule", copied by other municipalities, which requires that dancers maintain a six-foot (1.8 m) distance from customers while performing topless or nude. The rule is not in effect when dancers are wearing bikinis or other work outfits. The existence of this rule is indicative of the level of scrutiny of dancer-customer interaction prevailing in some locations.

==== Status of underage dancers ====
In July 2009, it was discovered that, in addition to not having a prostitution law (prostitution in Rhode Island was outlawed in 2009), Rhode Island also does not have a law to stop underage girls from being exotic dancers. The Mayor of Providence, David Cicilline signed an executive order, effective July 31, prohibiting the city Board of Licenses from issuing adult entertainment licenses to establishments that employ minors. The club owners also made a pledge to not employ underage girls.

==== Court cases ====
In 1991, the U.S. Supreme Court ruled in Barnes v. Glen Theatre, Inc. that nudity in itself is not "expressive conduct" (or "symbolic speech") entitled to free speech protection of the First Amendment. It also ruled that topless or nude dancing may be expressive but that a state may nevertheless outlaw public nudity (i.e., not the dance itself) on the basis of furthering public's interest in maintaining morality and order.

In 2000, the Supreme Court reaffirmed its finding in Erie v. Pap's A. M. ruling that nude dancing was expressive conduct "marginally" protected by the First Amendment, but that it could be regulated to limit the "secondary effects", such as crime.

== Prostitution in strip clubs ==
In many parts of the world, brothels are located behind strip clubs. Rules governing strip clubs and the overall adult entertainment industry vary around the world, and formats sometimes are combined under a single roof or complex. For example, in Bangkok, Thailand, the Nana Entertainment Plaza is a large four-floor compound with over 40 bars. Most of the bars are go-go bars where girls dance in various stages of nudity. They are not formal brothels, since customers must negotiate with the female workers for services up to and including sex without an intermediary. The Zona Norte red light district in Tijuana, Mexico has a number of legal brothels which are modeled on strip clubs and feature U.S.-style striptease performed by its prostitutes. Zurich, Switzerland also has legalized prostitution, and its strip clubs throughout the city offer sex among their services. Differing from Zurich brothels, sex services in the strip clubs are typically performed off site. Eastern European strip clubs have a similar model. A "sex zone" in Tokyo, Japan which is only 0.34 square kilometers had approximately 3,500 sex facilities as of 1999. These included strip theaters, peep shows, "soaplands," "lover's banks," porno shops, telephone clubs, karaoke bars, clubs and more all offering adult entertainment services. Filipino red light districts contain go-go bars and strip clubs tightly concentrated with other types of businesses and each other similar to the U.S. In Dubai, a city governed by very strict cultural norms and laws, there are several Indian strip clubs offering at least partial-nudity. Newspaper reports indicate that customers can occasionally purchase sex in some American strip clubs. Both the U.S. municipalities of Detroit, Michigan and Houston, Texas were reputed to have rampant occurrences of illicit activity including prostitution linked to its striptease establishments within their city limits. Prostitution is illegal in all states except in some rural counties in Nevada. Prostitution in Rhode Island was outlawed in 2009.

== See also ==
- Operation G-Sting, FBI probe into bribes and unreported campaign contributions taken by Clark County Commissioners in Clark County, Nevada and commissioners in San Diego, California.
- Prostitution in Nevada
- Prostitution in Rhode Island
- Strippergate (Seattle), Two separate government scandals and criminal investigations on the West Coast both involving strip clubs and organized crime.
- Las Vegas Dancers Alliance
