= Hunk-O-Mania =

American male entertainment company

- Industry: Entertainment
- Founded: 1998
- Founder: Armand Peri
- Headquarters: New York City, United States
- Key people: Armand Peri (CEO); Fran Melo (CFO)
- Website: www.hunkomanianyc.com

Hunk-O-Mania is an American male entertainment company known for featuring male strippers and male dancers. The company operates in 19 cities in the United States.

== History ==
Hunk-O-Mania, LLC began in New York City in 1998 with three performers and two backup dancers.

In 2007, Hunk-O-Mania expanded into Atlantic City, NJ and began its first show.

In 2008, Hunk-O-Mania began its first show in Chicago, Illinois. In 2011, Hunk-O-Mania opened its first show in Philadelphia, Pennsylvania.

In 2012, Hunk-O-Mania began a show in the Houston, Texas. In 2013, Hunk-O-Mania expanded into the Boston, Massachusetts and Miami, Florida, areas.

The Hunk-O-Mania show is a subsidiary of New-Age Productions and Sales Jet, Inc.

== Services ==
Hunk-O-Mania provides entertainment for women celebrating milestones in their lives including bachelorette parties, birthday parties and divorce parties. Hunk-O-Mania also travels to cities and other countries for their performances.

== See also ==
- Strip club
- Stripper
- Chippendales
- Magic Mike
- Dreamboys
