= Danzine =

Danzine was a Portland, Oregon-based harm reduction, outreach, and education organization for and by sex workers.

== Organization ==
In 1994, "Theresa Dulce" and "Mona Superhero", were touring the United States working at strip clubs when their car broke down outside Portland, Oregon. They stayed. Superhero, an artist who was part of a zinester network, suggested that they start a zine for dancers, called Danzine. Danzine grew from a monthly resource and information list into a zine edited by Dulce, while Danzine the organization expanded to offer needle exchange, a drop-in center and clothing store, and to doing public advocacy and organizing against political repression of sex workers.

Dulce and Marne Lucas co-curated Portland's Sex by Sex Worker Film and Video Festival.

== Legacy and aftermath ==
In June 2005, Dulce and Lucas co-curated the "Danzine Retrospective" exhibit within At the Mercy of Others: the Politics of Care, an exhibition of the Whitney Museum of American Art's Independent Studies Program at the CUNY Graduate Center in New York. The exhibit replicated part of Danzine's offices—its "Switzerland" safe space—, and contained issues of Danzine, artworks by contributors, and video installations.
