= Mary's Club =

Strip club in Portland, Oregon, U.S.

- Logo

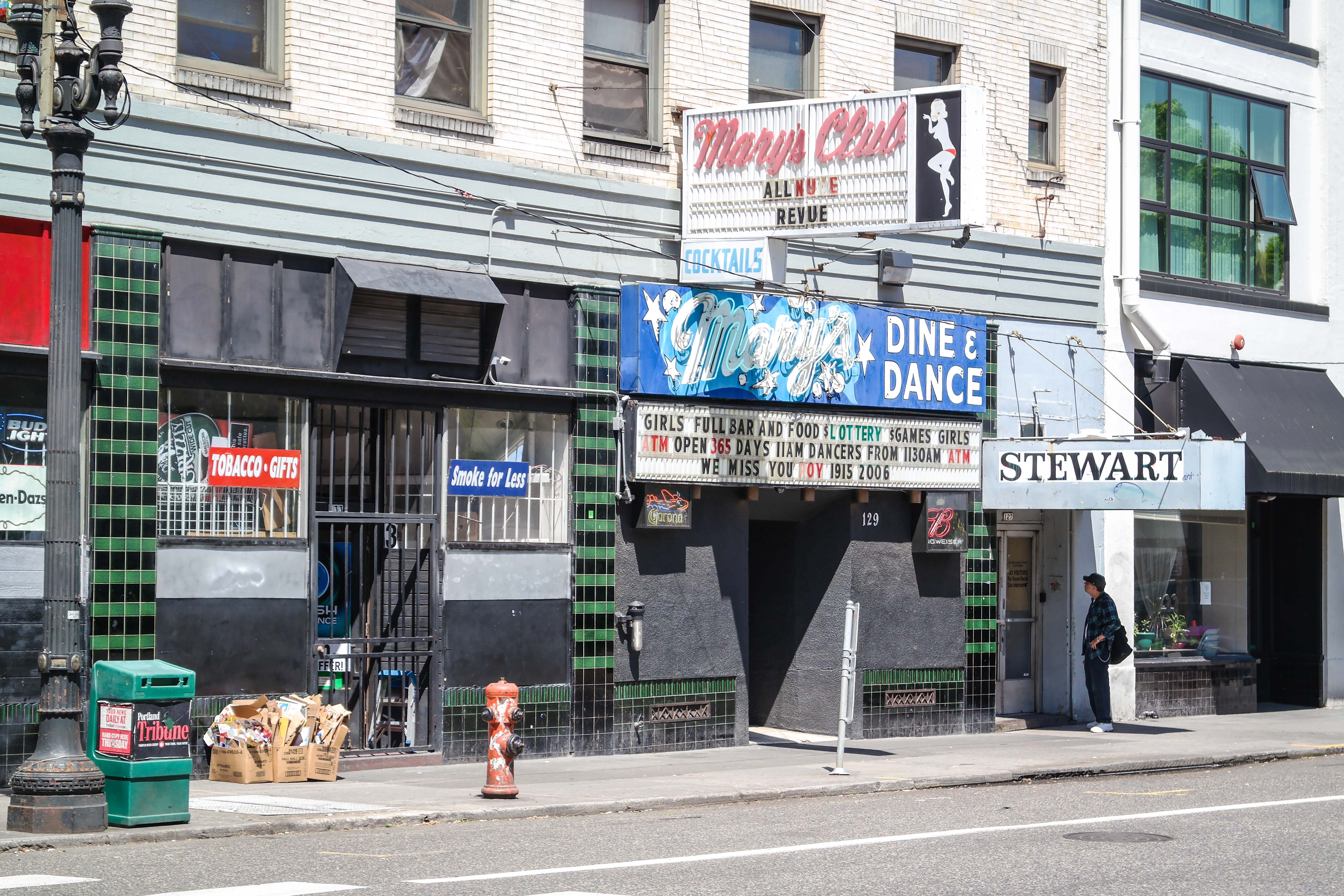
- The club's front entrance in 2014

- Location in Portland, Oregon
- Address: 503 West Burnside Street
- Location: Portland, Oregon, U.S.
- Coordinates: 45.5228°N 122.6778°W
- Operator: Mary Duerst Hemming (1930s–1954); Roy Keller (1954–2006); Vicki Keller (2006–present)

Website
- www.marysclub.com

Mary's Club is the oldest strip club in Portland, Oregon, and among the oldest in the United States. In 1954, Roy Keller bought the business from Mary Duerst Hemming, who owned and operated Mary's as a piano bar beginning in the 1930s. Keller initially hired go-go dancers as entertainment during the piano player's breaks, later hiring them full-time because of their popularity. Topless dancers wearing pasties were introduced in 1955. The club also featured comics, musicians, singers and other acts. All-nude dancing began in 1985, after a judicial ruling against City of Portland ordinances banning it in venues which served alcohol.

Former strippers include Courtney Love and Christine Jorgensen, although the club is known for its longtime dancers who are loyal to the family business. Since Keller's death in 2006, Mary's Club has been owned and operated by his daughter Vicki. A Portland institution, it has been included in several strip-club "best of" lists and its neon sign is considered a landmark. The club has appeared in several films, including Bongwater (1997) and Brainsmasher... A Love Story (1993). An elevated view of the first location of Mary's appears in a scene of The Hunted (2013 film) when actor Tommy Lee Jones gazes out the police station window. The club has also been included in walking tours of the city.

== History ==
Mary's Club, known as "Portland's first topless", is the oldest strip club in Portland. Portland shipyard foreman Roy Keller bought the club in 1954 for about $25,000 from Mary Duerst Hemming, who was awarded the piano bar (which was popular with sailors) in a divorce settlement and operated the business "for more than 20 years" beginning in the 1930s. According to The Seattle Times, Keller initially hired go-go dancers to entertain the crowd during the piano player's breaks. Due to the dancers' popularity, Keller hired them full-time, laid off the piano player and introduced "pasties-clad topless dancers" in 1955. That year, two city-council members advised Keller not to install pinball machines at the club since Portland then had an anti-pinball ordinance which was being contested in court. A Mary's Club team played in the Multnomah League of the Portland Basketball Association during the 1955–56 season with teams sponsored by Interstate Hauling, Kent's Keg, Il Trovatore, Frolic Inn, and the Portland Air Base, among others.

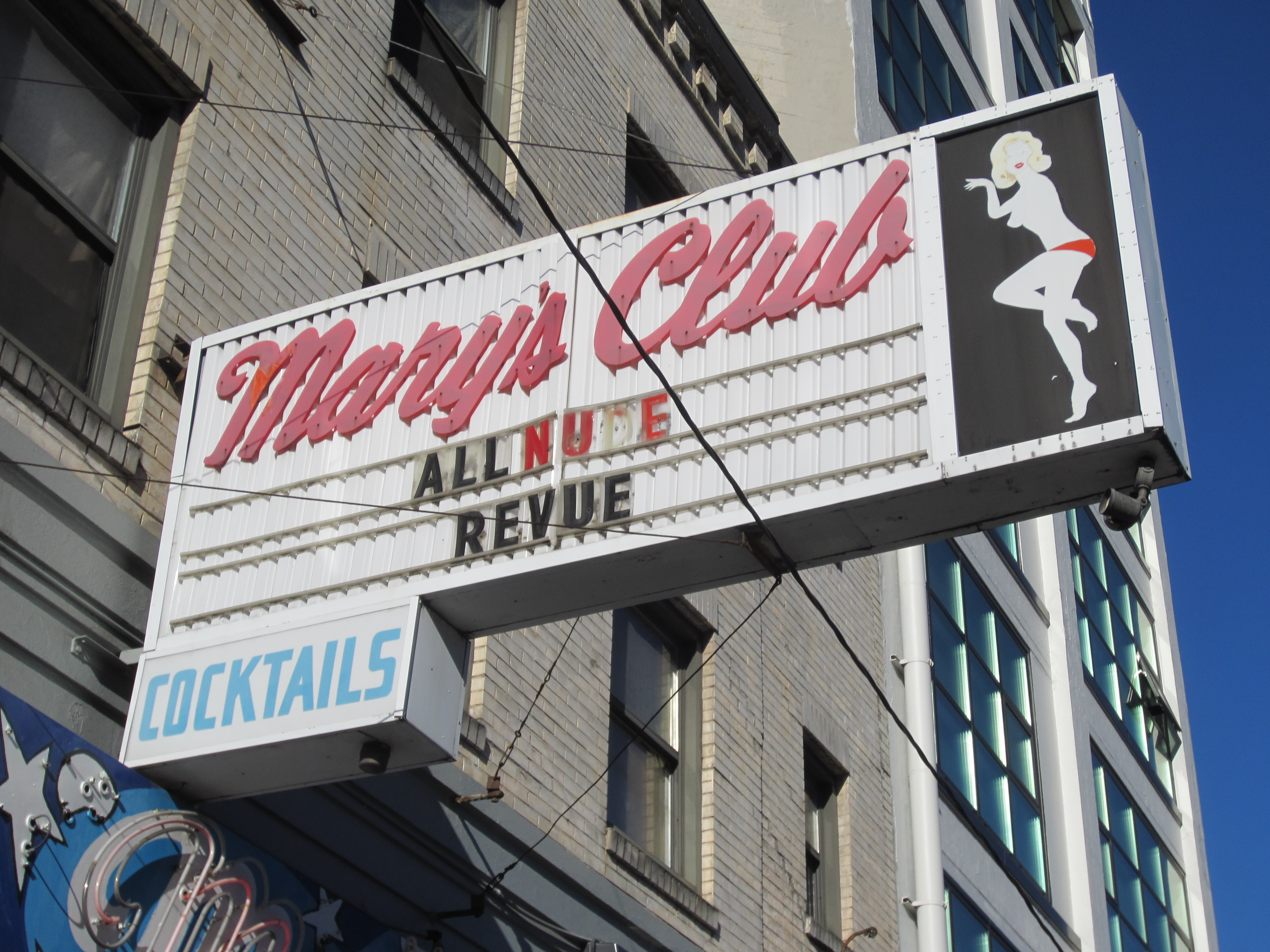
Marquee in 2014

Singers, comics, and piano players performed at the club. A 1958 newspaper advertisement announced its opening act as Tiny Watson, "200 pounds of mirth and merriment", and compared her to Sophie Tucker. The closing performer was George James, "King of the Keyboards". In 1965, an Oregonian article featured topless dancer Bambi Darling, who performed at Mary's Club; she reportedly excelled in discothèque, "shaking and undulating" to the Mashed Potato, the Monkey, the Shotgun, and other dances popular at the time. Keller, said to resemble "a church deacon", praised his dancers and described his customer base as "more refined" than that of the club's pre-1954 era. By March 1966, Darling's "16 torrid acts" shared the bill with reptile-wrestler Bobby Vale and Gigi La France, promoted as the club's answer to James Bond. Tom Waits reportedly sang about the club in "Pasties and a G-String" from his album, Small Change (1976). In 2012, an author wrote that Mary's Club featured "tattooed contortionist entertainers".

Nude dancing at the club began in 1985 after a judge overturned City of Portland ordinances banning it at venues which served alcohol. A lawsuit over pasties and G-strings was brought after Portland annexed land formerly regulated by Multnomah County, which allowed tavern dancers to perform without clothing. A bar forced by the annexation to eliminate its nude dancing successfully sued the city. "As soon as we got the word [about the ruling], we went nude," said a club employee who was quoted in The Oregonian.

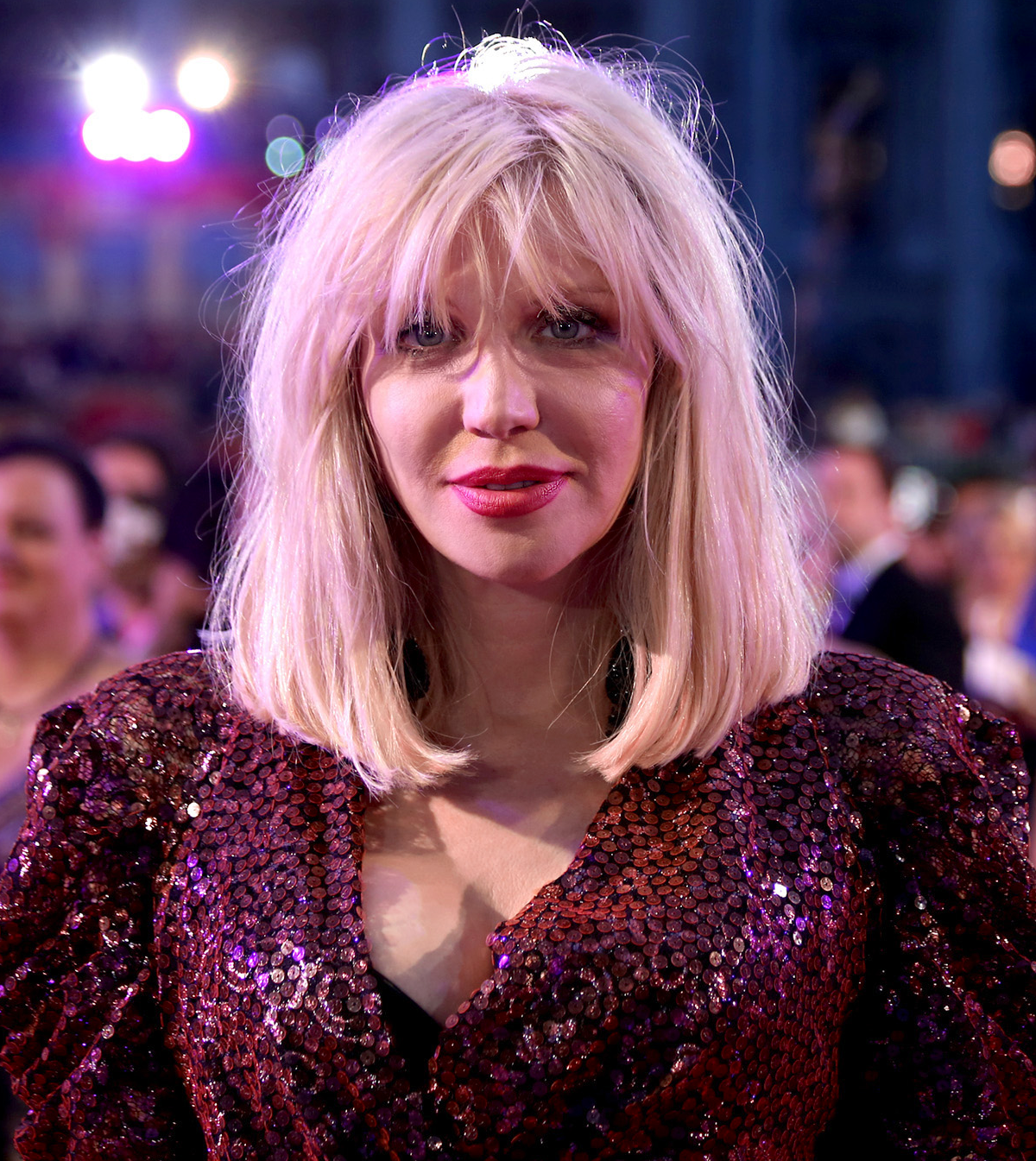
Courtney Love (pictured in 2014) performed at the club.

According to Willamette Week, Courtney Love (whose autographed picture hangs on a club wall) is a former Mary's Club stripper. Love wrote on the photograph that she "bought my very first guitar here showing my teeny little titties". Although Christine Jorgensen was also featured at the club, dancers tend to be longtime employees loyal to the family-run business. Keller died in 2006 at age 90; Mary's Club is now run by his daughter, Vicki, who remembered that she first worked there as a seven-year-old waitress. Vicki managed the business for twenty-five years before her father's death, and her daughters worked at the club during that period.

According to a 2013 Portland Monthly profile, Mary's Club has a full cocktail bar, more than two dozen varieties of beer and wine, and a menu featuring Mexican cuisine. The club has a one-drink minimum and a small cover charge on Friday and Saturday evenings.

In August 2021, Mary's Club announced it would be moving from its Southwest Broadway location due to the building it occupied being sold. Mary's Club reopened on West Burnside Street in December 2021.

In July 2022, a Mary's Club security guard shot two men outside the venue, killing one and injuring the other. A lawsuit was filed against the business for negligence.

== Murals and marquee ==
Between 1956 and 1958, Keller hired La Monte Montyne to paint murals throughout the club's interior. The fluorescent murals depict scenes which Roy thought patrons would appreciate. Several feature women in exotic locales, such as the Orient and the Pyramids; one depicts an "island beauty" watching sailors load bananas onto a ship, and another shows merchant seamen working in front of a ship docked in a "Portland-like" harbor. The mural at the Pyramids depicts a lounging Cleopatraesque woman, and another features an "exotic priestess" making a sacrifice at a volcano. According to Mary's, the murals receive "almost as much attention as the girls do!" Mary's "retro" neon marquee has been called a "landmark for locals and tourists alike". In 2014, a Willamette Week contributor said about the signage: "The marquee, blue and star-spangled and coyly advertising an evening of 'Dine and Dance', is as iconic as the neon on the 'Made in Oregon' sign and the line outside Voodoo". The club's cocktail-waitress logo is featured on clothing, and its marquee also includes an epitaph to Keller.

== Reception ==
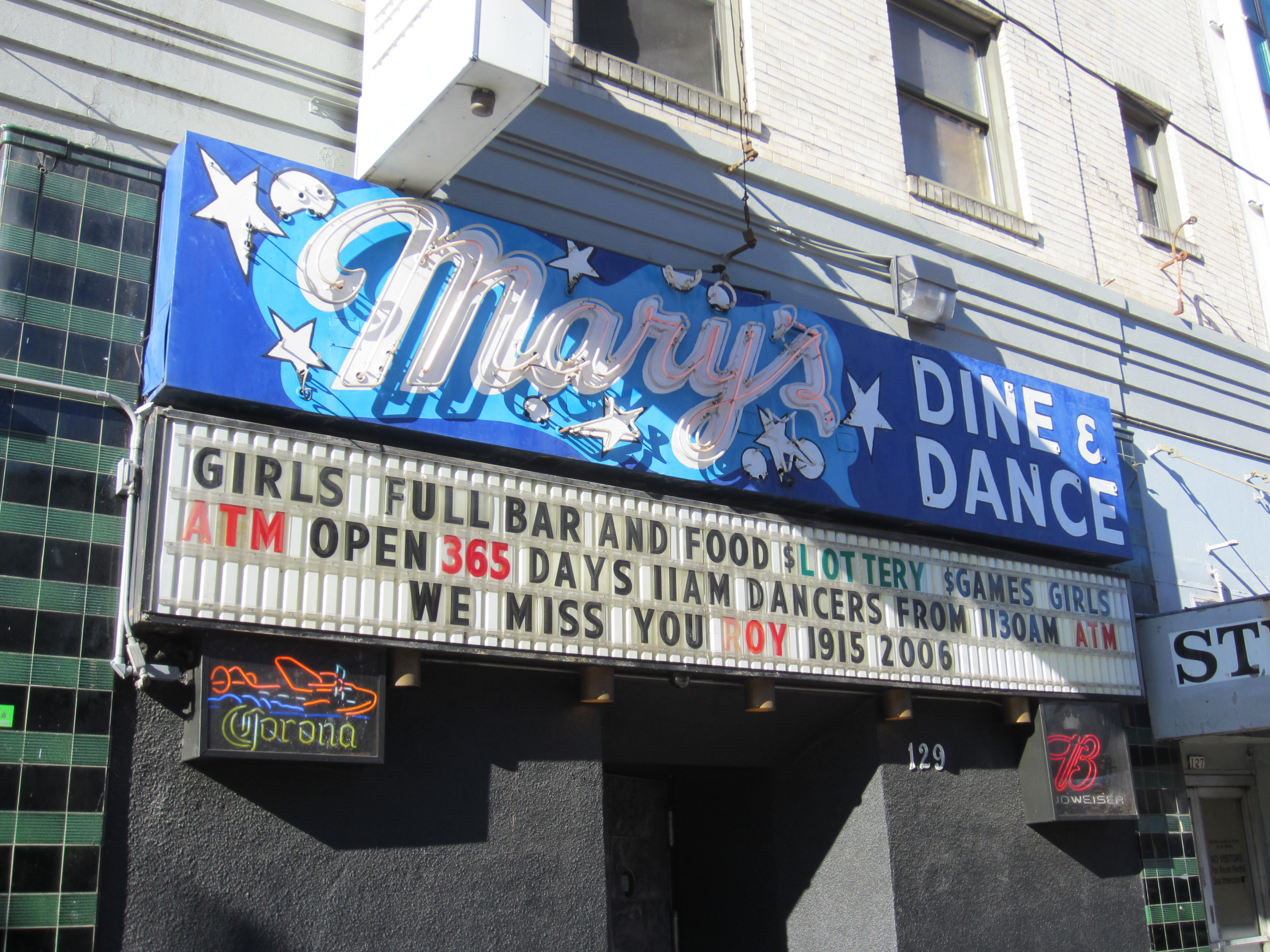
Entrance sign in 2014

Mary's Club has been called a "downtown institution" and a "Portland nightlife landmark". In 2001, The Portland Mercury called the club "a must-visit for any true strip club connoisseur" for offering "friendliness and sexiness". A reporter found the interior "cozy", with conversational dancers who seemed to enjoy their interaction with guests. After Keller's death, Willamette Week said that the club "has cemented its place in history far beyond the city limits" for featuring Love and Jorgensen and offering nudity to a loyal customer base. The newspaper's Mary Christmas wrote that Keller had become a "regional celebrity" and could be credited with beginning a local industry. In 2011, a contributor to the Daily Vanguard (Portland State University's student newspaper) included Mary's on his list of the city's top five strip clubs: "If you visit only one dance club in this town it should probably be Mary’s. The inside is stuffy and sleazy, but embodies that red-light district feel that fits right in with [the] rowdy environment." That year, Willamette Week called the club "the undisputed grande dame of West Coast strips" and "a stubbornly degenerate landmark". According to the newspaper's Matthew Korfhage, its entertainment came in the form of "girls/ladies, friendly also brassy, oddly classy, with sterling taste on the juke, who let you see all of their piercings and tattoos. Also, video poker". Mary's Club was a finalist in the Best Strip Club category of Willamette Week's annual 'Best of Portland' readers' poll in 2025. In 2013, Portland Monthly made Mary's Club an "editor's pick" for its dancers, its all-female staff, and its "welcoming and relaxed" environment. Thrillist.com included Mary's in its "definitive guide" to Portland's best strip clubs, complimenting its "glorious flashing sign that welcomes you to Downtown" and calling the club "a part of Portland's past we should all cherish". Men's Fitness included Mary's on its list of the "Top 10 Best Strip Clubs in America", calling it a "neon landmark" with blacklight murals and a "relaxed, hole-in-the-wall vibe".

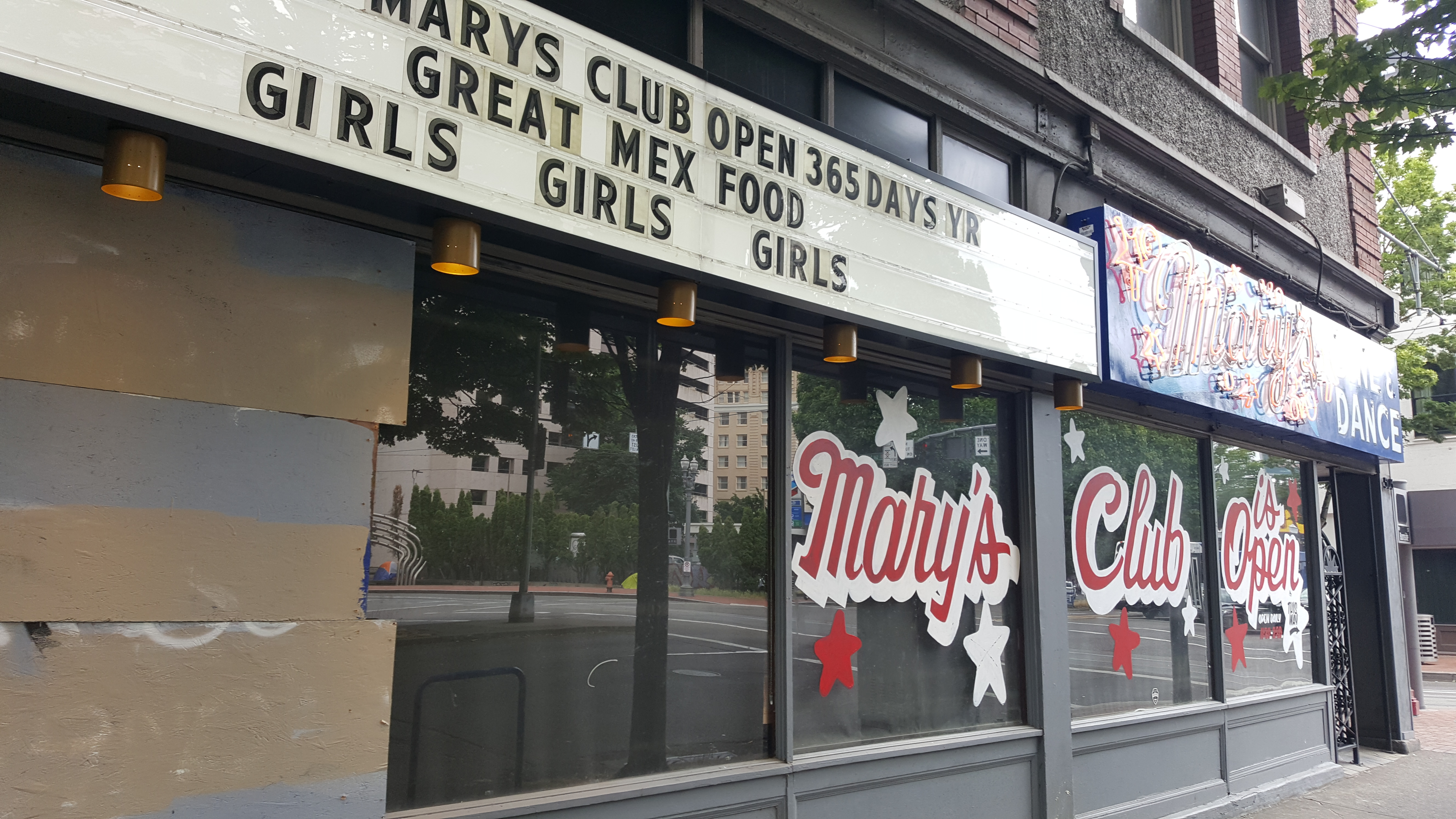
Exterior in mid 2022

Thomas Lauderdale, known for his work with the Portland-based band Pink Martini, has shared his fondness for the club and considers it one of his favorite places in the city. Portland Monthly published a video of Lauderdale giving a tour of the club. Lauderdale interviews Vicki Keller and shows the interior murals. He sometimes wears a Pink Martini bomber-style jacket inspired by one sold by the business in the 1950s. Films including scenes shot at Mary's include Bongwater (1997), Brainsmasher... A Love Story (1993) and Dangerous Pursuit (1990). The club has been included in walking tours of Portland, including Lonely Planet's "Underground Portland". Mary's Club was the last stop on the 2013 "Seedy, Seamy and Sinful Portland" history tour, which took adult visitors to Old Town Chinatown sites to examine the city's "darker elements". Led by a historian, the tour included saloons, opium dens, gambling halls, and bordellos which operated in the city. It was repeated in the historian's 2014 tour, "Shanghaiers, Saloons and Skullduggery: A Walking Tour of Portland's Sinful Past".

== See also ==
- Carriage Room
- Culture of Portland, Oregon
- List of strip clubs
