= Sienna Morris =

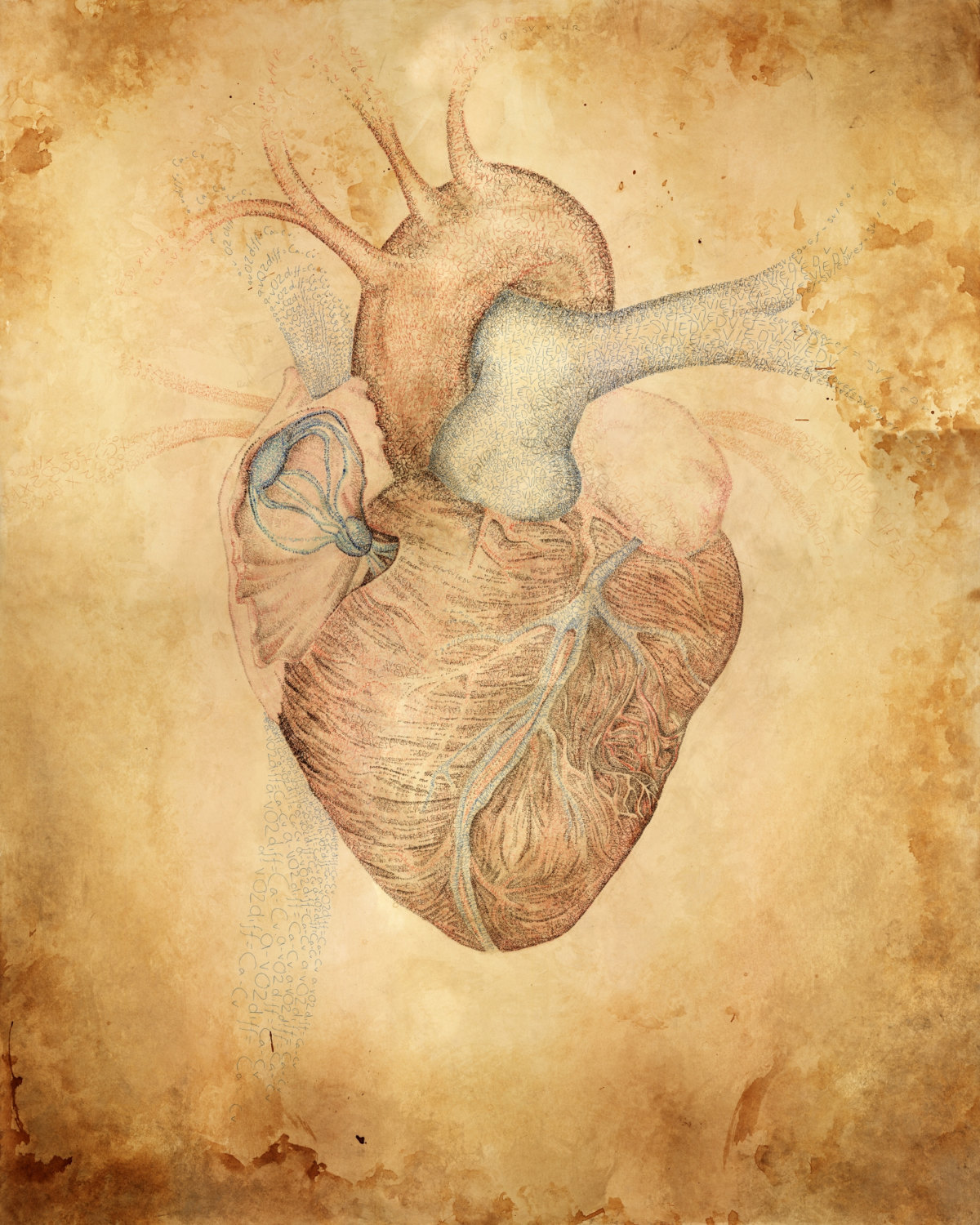
"Heart" by Sienna Morris (2017)

Sienna Morris (née Cenere; born November 17, 1983) is an artist living in Portland, Oregon. She is an illustrator best known for her drawing technique, Numberism. This technique is similar to stippling or pointillism, but uses numbers and equations in place of dots.

== Nominations and Publications ==
In 2013, Morris's Numberism drawing Schrodinger's Cat was featured on the cover as well as in the content of the German Physics book, Faszinierende Physik: Ein bebilderter Streifzug vom Universum bis in die Welt der Elementarteilchen.

In 2014, Evolution Expo licensed the Universal Proprioception drawing as their logo for their convention (June 27-29) celebrating the connection between science and science fiction.

Morris was nominated for the 2014 Geekie Awards in arts and crafts.

She was voted runner up for Best Visual Artist in the Willamette Week Best of Portland Readers' Poll in 2015.

The article Numberism: exploring science through Art was published about Morris's work in the summer 2016 issue of Physiology News magazine.
