= Crazy Horse Too =

Former strip club in Las Vegas, Nevada

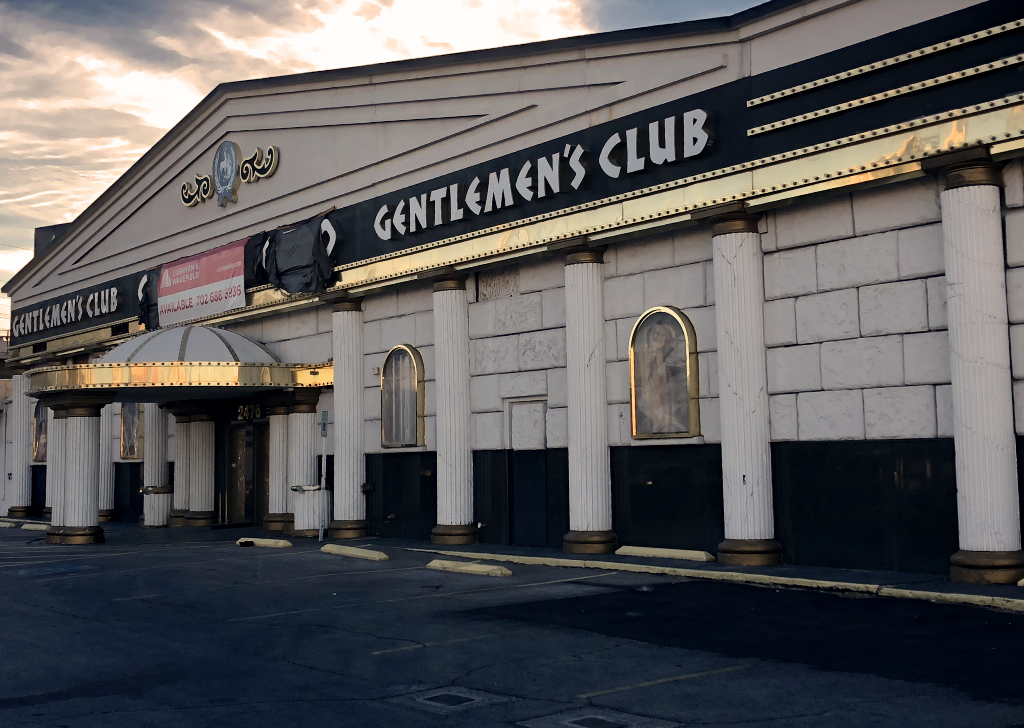
- The closed Crazy Horse Too in 2018.
- Interactive map of the Crazy Horse Too area
- Former names: Billy Jo's (until 1978); Billy Jo's Crazy Horse Too (1978–1981); The Horse Gentlemen's Club (2013–2014)

General information
- Type: Strip club
- Location: Las Vegas, Nevada, 2476 Industrial Road
- Coordinates: 36.144392°N 115.164774°W
- Completed: 1972
- Opened: 1970s
- Renovated: 1998; 2013
- Closed: August 23, 2014
- Demolished: December 2022

Technical details
- Floor count: 1

Other information
- Parking: 600

Crazy Horse Too was a strip club located at 2476 Industrial Road in Las Vegas, Nevada, a few blocks west of the Las Vegas Strip. The club was known as Billy Jo's during the 1970s. In 1978, the club was purchased by Mob member Tony Albanese and renamed Billy Jo's Crazy Horse Too, after the Crazy Horse Saloon, another Las Vegas strip club owned by Albanese. In 1984, Rick Rizzolo took over operations of the club when it was purchased by his father, Bart Rizzolo. Rick Rizzolo was a majority owner by 1986.

In 1995, federal officials began an investigation of activities at Crazy Horse Too. The club endured a history of violent crimes, including the alleged beating of a tourist in 2001. In 2003, Crazy Horse Too was searched by multiple government officials who were investigating possible links between the club and organized crime. As part of a plea bargain, Rick Rizzolo and 16 club officials pleaded guilty to multiple charges in May and June 2006; Rizzolo was ordered to sell the club within a year as part of the deal. Crazy Horse Too subsequently closed in September 2006, after its liquor license was revoked. The club reopened with a temporary liquor license in October 2006.

Rizzolo's attempts to sell Crazy Horse Too failed, and the club was closed again in August 2007, when it was seized by the United States Marshals Service. After multiple failed attempts to sell Crazy Horse Too, the federal government auctioned the club in 2011. California strip club owner Mike Galam reopened the club in May 2013, as The Horse Gentlemen's Club; another Las Vegas strip club, Crazy Horse III, alleged that "Crazy Horse Too" was a trademark infringement. The Horse reverted to its previous name in February 2014, after a judge ruled that Galam had purchased the rights to the name.

Crazy Horse Too closed in August 2014, because of poor customer attendance and liquor license violations. The club continued to open once a month for eight hours to retain its erotic dance establishment license and land use rights. However, the license was revoked in August 2019, as the building had fallen into disrepair and was the target of vagrant break-ins. The building was heavily damaged in a June 2022 fire and was demolished at the end of the year.

== Background ==
=== Early history (1972–2000) ===
Crazy Horse Too operated in a strip mall, constructed in 1972, on Industrial Road, directly north of an overpass used for West Sahara Avenue. By 1978, a popular discothèque named Billy Jo's, which included strippers, had been operating in the strip mall. Tony Albanese, a member of the Mob, purchased Billy Jo's that year after its owner died of health complications. Albanese had already opened a strip club named Crazy Horse Saloon at the intersection of Paradise Road and Flamingo Road, and chose to rename his new club as Billy Jo's Crazy Horse Too. Henry Rapuano took over operations of the club in 1981, after Albanese's severed head was found in the desert in Needles, California.

Rapuano renamed the club simply as Crazy Horse Too. Rapuano died of a sudden heart attack in 1982. Frederick "Rick" Rizzolo – a close associate of Henry Rapuano's son, Al Rapuano – took over operations on February 1, 1984; Rick Rizzolo's father, Bart Rizzolo, purchased the club that month. The club at that time contained 1,200 sq ft (110 m^{2}) and had 12 strippers employed. In 1985, a man named Rick Sandlin suffered permanent brain damage after being beaten outside the club with a baseball bat by Rick Rizzolo, who claimed he was defending himself. Rizzolo, represented by criminal defense attorney Oscar Goodman, pleaded no contest to a misdemeanor charge and avoided jail time. By 1986, Rizzolo was the club's majority owner.

From 1984 until 2006, Rick Rizzolo was involved in an ongoing dispute over parking with "Buffalo" Jim Barrier, a well-known Las Vegas personality and a commercial tenant of Rizzolo. According to numerous newspaper and television reports, for 22 years, Rizzolo engaged in an unsuccessful pattern of harassment aimed at driving Buffalo Jim and his automotive repair business off the Crazy Horse Too property so that the club could expand.

In 1991, future pornographic film actress Jenna Jameson began working at the club. In 1998, Rizzolo invested $800,000 in a 6,000 sq ft (560 m^{2}) expansion of the club. The club was expanded into a closed adjacent adult novelty store named L.A. Hot. The expansion brought the club up to approximately 26,000 sq ft (2,400 m^{2}), and served as a new dressing room for the club's 600 workers. Rizzolo planned to eventually convert the former dressing room, which served as office space, into a new entertainment area with a bar and stage. Rizzolo learned during construction that he needed a variance for his expansion, as a zoning ordinance prohibited strip clubs from expanding if they were located within 1,000 feet of other sexually oriented businesses. Rizzolo chose to continue construction, as he believed he would be approved for a variance; he said he would likely sue if he was denied.

In January 1999, the expansion was approved by the city's Board of Zoning Adjustments. However, the vote was appealed by a nearby resident and a business, with claims that the expansion would increase traffic and cause parking problems. Another complaint was that hundreds of local children would be exposed to an increased number of drug dealers and drug seekers who would visit the expanded club. City planners allowed Rizzolo to use his expansion pending the outcome of a vote by the City Council, which approved Rizzolo's request for a variance in February 1999. In October 2000, Crazy Horse Too filed a lawsuit against MGM Grand Las Vegas, seeking an injunction to prevent the resort from using the Crazy Horse name for their debut of a topless show titled Crazy Horse Paris. Crazy Horse Too also sought $10,000 in damages.

=== Criminal investigations (2001–2006) ===
On October 2, 2001, a lawsuit was filed against the club by Kirk Henry, a tourist from Kansas City, Kansas, who suffered a broken neck after visiting the club on September 20, 2001. Henry alleged that he was beaten up in the club's parking lot after a dispute involving an $80 tab at the club's bar. Representatives of the club contend that Henry was heavily drunk and fell in the parking lot, breaking his own neck. The lawsuit allowed authorities to pursue a criminal RICO investigation of the club.

On October 4, 2001, police utilized search warrants to search the club and confiscate business records, although the club was allowed to remain open during the search. The Las Vegas Metropolitan Police Department was investigating the case as of April 2002. Nearly a year after the incident, agents from the Federal Bureau of Investigation (FBI) interviewed Henry, who identified Bobby D'Apice, a shift manager at the club, as the man who allegedly attacked him. The Las Vegas Metropolitan Police Department launched a criminal investigation in October 2002. By the end of the month, the Federal Bureau of Investigation had taken the lead in the investigation.

As part of the investigation, Rick Rizzolo was questioned about his relationships with various crime figures. Henry's lawyers alleged that many of Crazy Horse Too's employees had extensive criminal records for various offenses. In November 2002, police detectives declined to turn over documents from their investigation, saying, "Premature disclosure of this information would prejudice the criminal investigation and endanger the safety of possible witnesses." Police officials and the FBI expected the investigation to continue for at least another six months.

==== Raid ====
On February 20, 2003, around 5:00 a.m., the club was raided by approximately 80 to 100 law enforcement officers, some of them armed with rifles. The group included agents from the Federal Bureau of Investigation, the Drug Enforcement Administration, the Internal Revenue Service (IRS), and the Las Vegas Metropolitan Police Department, as well as two SWAT teams. Crazy Horse Too's attorney, Tony Sgro, said, "They handled (Thursday's) search with the scope and intensity that would be expected if they had located a terrorist cell within the club." Sgro also said, "It was like they found somebody in the al-Qaida network in there. That's how many agents were in there." Sgro criticized the search warrant, as he believed that it contained vague and generic wording. Sgro noted the presence of the news media as the raid began, and called it "nothing short of a publicity stunt." The raid, which lasted 11 hours, was conducted as part of an investigation to determine possible links between the club and organized crime. The investigation had been ongoing for at least 15 months. Officers seized a variety of records – a total of 170 items – that dated back to 1995. The search ended around 4:00 p.m., and the club reopened later that night. The only drug found on the premises was a marijuana cigarette in a stripper's locker.

On February 21, 2003, Sgro filed a motion in U.S. District Court, seeking the return of certain items seized during the raid: "The club is making a request for the return of only a tiny fraction of the truckloads of equipment, furniture and records taken from the club. These items are basic to the running of the business and are required immediately." The items included nine cash registers, valued at over $10,000 each. Other requested items included computers and current financial documents needed for preparing 2002 tax returns. According to Bart Rizzolo, who had a 10 percent interest in the club, officers also seized all of the club's money in the raid, at least $250,000. Sgro said the Federal Rules of Criminal Procedure was violated during the raid, claiming that a Crazy Horse Too representative was not allowed to observe the search: "It cannot be determined, with any accuracy, what was actually taken by officers or what might have been left behind." Rick Rizzolo, who denied any involvement in criminal activity, said his club made more than $10 million a year: "It makes so much money, I wouldn't do something stupid to jeopardize it." Rick Rizzolo also planned to sue the federal government for the money lost during the raid, estimated to be between $40,000 and $60,000.

One of the items under investigation was the $20,000 monthly consulting fee from the Crazy Horse Too bar in Chicago that was being paid to Rizzolo. Actors Robert De Niro and Joe Pesci were interviewed as part of the investigation, as well as George Clooney, who was a longtime friend of Rick Rizzolo.

In late February 2003, employees alleged that they were held at gunpoint during the raid and were forced to provide videotaped statements in exchange for their release from the club. In March 2003, a judge ordered the return of all items seized during the raid. Rick Rizzolo said business had improved at the club as a result of publicity from the raid. As of March 2003, Crazy Horse Too had approximately 100 employees and more than 5,700 strippers. Talks about a possible plea bargain began a few months after the raid.

==== Further developments ====
In October 2003, Rick Rizzolo filed a lawsuit against the Las Vegas Metropolitan Police Department and several of its officers for their search of the club in October 2001. Rizzolo alleged that the officers persuaded a judge to issue the search warrant by using false information and omitting facts, saying that "there was not in fact probable cause to search the club." That same month, Sgro revealed that Rick Rizzolo had been informed recently that federal authorities had wiretapped Rizzolo's phones and had been intercepting his phone conversations as early as 1996. At the end of the month, a man suffered multiple gunshot wounds after arguing with another person in the club's parking lot. The shooter, unaffiliated with the club, was not found. In November 2003, the Las Vegas Review-Journal noted that the club's violent crimes tend to occur in its parking lot. From 2001 through 2003, officers from the Las Vegas Metropolitan Police Department had been called out to the club more than 700 times.

In November 2004, D'Apice's home was searched by FBI and IRS agents as part of their investigation into the club. On January 19, 2005, D'Apice was arrested for alleged activities he participated in at the club including federal racketeering charges, assault from a 2001 crime, aided and abetted in prostitution or illegal sexual activity, and distribution of narcotics. It was the first arrest in the ongoing investigation. D'Apice had worked at the club for approximately a decade. It was also revealed that federal officials had been investigating the club since August 1995. D'Apice and a cocktail waitress were also charged with making false statements to a federal grand jury in January 2003 and August 2002 respectively, regarding Henry's incident at the club in September 2001.

In March 2005, Rizzolo's lawyers anticipated an indictment would be made soon. In January 2006, Luke Brugnara planned to purchase the club. In April 2006, talks increased regarding a group plea deal. In May 2006, 16 people involved with the club pleaded guilty as part of the group plea deal. The plea agreements revealed that strippers at Crazy Horse Too were required to pay 15 percent of their earnings to certain employees at the club. The agreements also revealed that management and other employees at the club had agreed to underreport financial income at the end of each shift, from 2000 to 2003.

On June 1, 2006, Rick Rizzolo pleaded guilty as part of the group plea deal, in which Rizzolo agreed to sell Crazy Horse Too within 12 months. It had been reported that Rizzolo was in talks with potential buyers, including one who was willing to pay $36 million for the club. Rizzolo was required to pay $17 million in fines, including $4.2 million to the federal government and $1.7 million to the IRS. The deal also required Rizzolo to pay $10 million to Henry, after the sale of the club. As part of the deal, prosecutors agreed not to press criminal charges against Rizzolo's sister, Annette Patterson; his brother, Ralph; or his father, Bart, all of whom had been employed or involved at the club. The investigation, which generated more than 8,000 hours of wiretapped conversations, focused on allegations of money laundering, prostitution, tax evasion, and violence.

In July 2006, the Las Vegas City Council voted to hold a hearing in September to discuss penalties for Crazy Horse Too following the guilty pleas from club officials. On September 6, 2006, the City Council voted to revoke the club's liquor license and to impose a fine of nearly $2.2 million, as council members were concerned that some of the people who had pleaded guilty earlier that year were still operating the club. Deputy City Attorney Bill Henry said that Rizzolo "ran the Crazy Horse Too like Tony Soprano runs the Bada Bing."

Crazy Horse Too stopped serving alcoholic beverages on September 7, 2006, after city officials and police served an order revoking the club's liquor license. However, the club resumed sales of alcohol later that night, after Sgro determined that "the way the city served the order was invalid". Sgro filed a complaint to halt the city's order, claiming that potential buyers would not be interested in purchasing the club if it were operating without a liquor license.

=== Closures and reopenings (2006–2019) ===
Crazy Horse Too closed on the afternoon of September 8, 2006, after a temporary restraining order against the city's decision was denied. While Sgro believed that Crazy Horse Too still had the right to serve alcohol, Rizzolo chose cautiously to have the club closed until a judge issued his decision. Sgro alleged that the city's "true intent" was to seize the property for a widening expansion of Industrial Road. On September 12, 2006, the judge upheld the city's decision to revoke the club's liquor license. Stuart Cadwell, a strip club owner and operator, had agreed in the previous week to purchase the club for $45 million. Although the deal was in escrow, Cadwell said the lack of a liquor license would probably nullify the deal.

On September 19, 2006, Michael Signorelli, who owned the nearby Golden Steer Steakhouse, applied for a temporary six-month liquor license at Crazy Horse Too. Signorelli would temporarily lease the club from Rizzolo, as Cadwell was still considered a potential buyer. At the end of September 2006, an opponent of Crazy Horse Too opened a nearby church; because of a Las Vegas city code, businesses that serve alcohol were prohibited from operating within 1,500 feet of a church. The church's deacon denied attempting to sabotage Signorelli's plans for the club. Signorelli was considered a potential buyer of the club in early October 2006, while a city attorney said the nearby church would not be able to prevent Crazy Horse Too from serving alcohol, saying the club would only become ineligible for a liquor license if it went six months without serving alcohol.

Crazy Horse Too reopened under new management on October 18, 2006, after Signorelli had been granted a temporary three-month liquor license earlier that day. Signorelli leased the club from Rizzolo for $400,000 a month. In January 2007, the city council extended Signorelli's temporary liquor license for another 90 days, despite various concerns, including Rizzolo's possible involvement with the club's operations. Despite lower lease payments as a result of poor business, Signorelli still planned to purchase the club, possibly for another use.

Despite concerns, particularly from Las Vegas police, the City Council approved Signorelli for a permanent liquor license in April 2007. The license came with 12 conditions, one being that Signorelli had to close escrow on the club by June 30, 2007, which was Rick Rizzolo's deadline for selling the club. Signorelli, who was considered a straw man, had until May 31, 2007, to deposit $38 million into escrow for the sale to close in time; Signorelli failed to do so. In early June 2007, Crazy Horse Too had four other potential buyers, while officials from the FBI, IRS, and U.S. Attorney's office were preparing to take over the club and liquidate it.

By late June 2007, Crazy Horse Too had at least two potential buyers: nightclub owner Tommy Karas, and Brugnara, both of whom were willing to pay over $30 million for the club. Crazy Horse Too's liquor license was revoked on July 1, 2007, although the club remained open. Later that month, Signorelli offered $31 million for the club, with $3 million in an escrow account. It was unclear why Signorelli missed the initial deadline. Signorelli also appealed the city's decision to revoke the club's liquor license. Rizzolo declined Signorelli's offer, citing Signorelli's past failure to meet certain obligations. At that time, there were two potential buyers interested in purchasing the club.

In August 2007, Crazy Horse Too had several offers ranging from $31 million to $34 million, with Rick Rizzolo facing a deadline to sell the club by September 30, 2007. At that time, the club's value was believed to have decreased significantly following Signorelli's management. In late August 2007, a retired NBA player was reportedly considering purchasing the club. The club closed later that month after it was seized by the United States Marshals Service.

==== Prospective buyers ====
In November 2007, an unnamed buyer planned to purchase the club for $31 million. In May 2008, David Dupont and Maheshkumar Patel, the principals of LCC Cafe Nevada, planned to purchase the closed club for $32 million. The men had approximately half of the money and attempted to obtain a liquor license in hopes of securing the remaining funds necessary to purchase the club. The club had a deadline of June 30, 2008, after which it would no longer be eligible to offer topless dancing and alcohol because of the current zoning codes. In June 2008, Dupont and Patel's request for a liquor license was denied. Later that month, a federal prosecutor urged a judge to override the city's ordinance in order to maintain the club's estimated value of $32 million to $35 million, for the sake of Henry's compensation. Without the special permits, the club's value was expected to drop to between $8 million and $10 million. The judge chose not to extend the deadline.

In September 2009, Christopher Condotti and his Chicago company, CC Holdings, planned to purchase the club. That month, CC Holdings filed a lawsuit against a Las Vegas strip club operating under the name "Crazy Horse III Gentlemen's Club." Condotti claimed that the club infringed on the "Crazy Horse Too" trademark, with the lawsuit claiming that the other club "is confusingly similar in sight, sound and meaning" to the trademark. The lawsuit sought damages and an injunction against the club's owner.

In April 2010, Condotti filed a $10.5 million sales contract in federal court, with one condition being that the club receive all the necessary licenses – a liquor license, a sexually oriented business license, a tobacco license, and a retail sales license – by November 30, 2010. The club would also require a special-use zoning permit, which necessitates approval from the city council. Las Vegas mayor Oscar Goodman demanded that the city be paid the $2 million fine owed by the club since September 2006, before issuing any of the licenses. Condotti challenged the fine in court. In December 2010, after failed sales attempts, a judge ordered the U.S. Marshals Service to sell the club "by any lawful means, including public auction," with a deadline of May 3, 2011. At that time, the club's value was estimated to be as low as $5 million.

In February 2011, the government scrapped its plans to sell the club and chose to let it enter foreclosure after realizing that the property could not be sold for the amount of liens against it. The club, at that time, was only valued at $2 million to $3 million, due to a poor economy and the lack of liquor and adult entertainment licenses. A foreclosure sale was expected to take place by April 1, 2011. Rizzolo's lawyer, Dominic Gentile, accused the government of mismanaging the sale: "This is the worst case of bad faith that I've experienced in almost 40 years as a lawyer. The only reason it's worth what it is today is because of the government's deliberate, malignant conduct. This is really, truly outrageous. It won't surprise me if they did it on purpose."

On July 1, 2011, a public auction failed to attract any potential bidders. As a result, Canico Capital Group, the owner of the property's first deed of trust, purchased the club for $3 million. Canico left open the possibility of persuading the city to reconsider its zoning laws, to allow for a strip club and bar to operate on the property again. Canico and city officials had been discussing the club's future for months as of May 2012. An attorney for Canico said that it was difficult to "imagine that such a funky little strip mall is the most talked about piece of real estate in Clark County."

In June 2012, the city council approved a city ordinance that would allow Crazy Horse Too to reopen as a strip club and bar, allowing Canico to sell the property to a potential buyer at a higher value. The vote was approved with the belief that Canico would donate $1.4 million to the city, an amount of money similar to what Rick Rizzolo owed from his September 2006 fine. In July 2012, the city council voted against diverting $750,000 of the $1.4 million donation to Henry, who had only received $1 million of the $10 million he was owed following his injury at the club in 2001.

==== New ownership ====
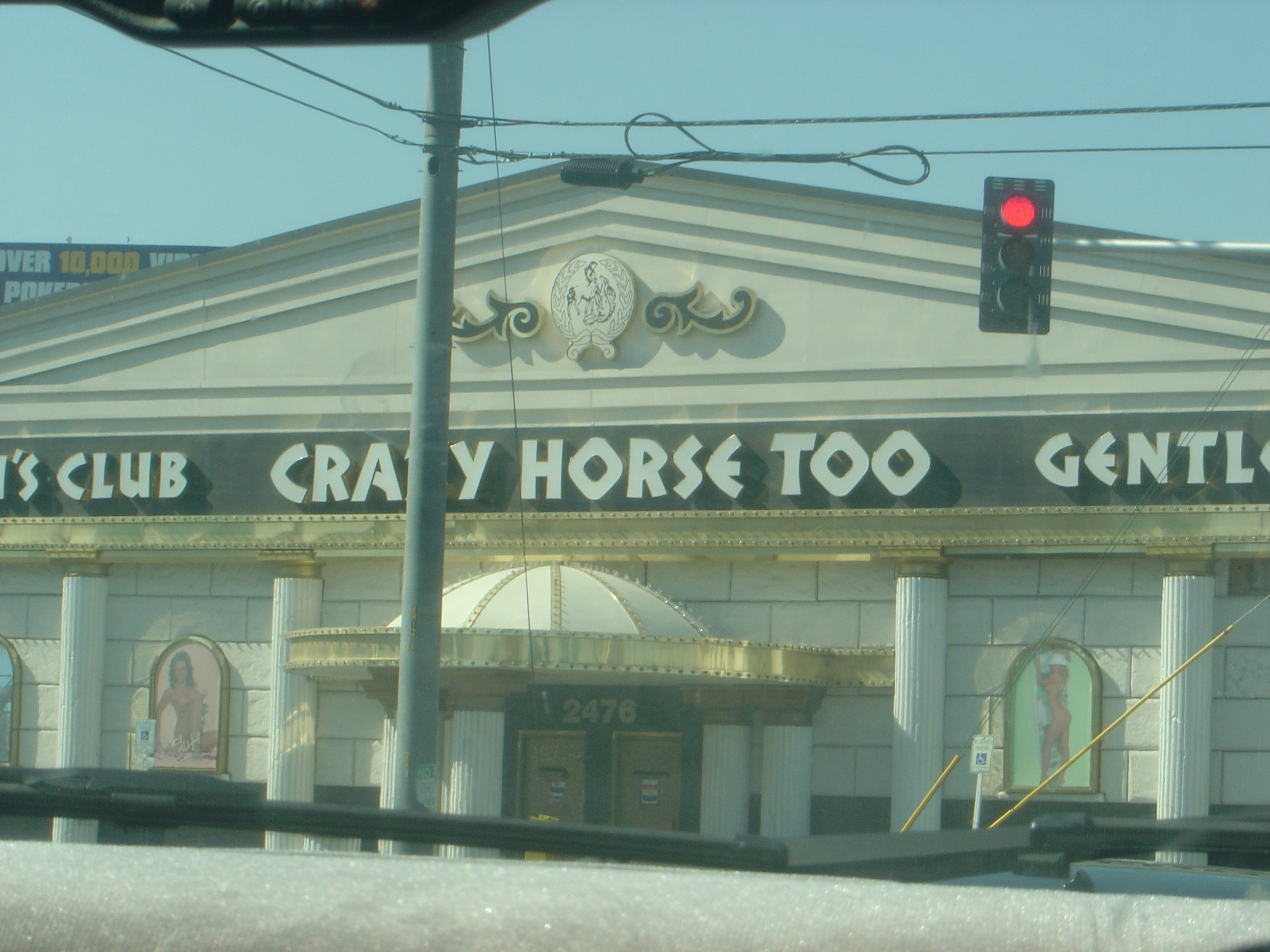
Crazy Horse Too entrance and original sign (2010)

In March 2013, California strip club owner Mike Galam purchased Crazy Horse Too as part of a $5 million, 59 percent stake in Canico. In early May 2013, Crazy Horse III filed a complaint against Galam, claiming that the club's use of the "Crazy Horse" name was a trademark infringement. The club was renamed as The Horse Gentlemen's Club. Crazy Horse Too's old sign was kept up, but covered with a new sign. Other potential names included "Crazy Mike's" and "The Two."

Nearly 60 strippers were hired for the club's grand reopening, which occurred on May 31, 2013. Galam hoped to have 200 to 250 strippers employed at The Horse within a couple of months. A new $75,000 sound system was installed, as well as $30,000 worth of new lights, and 96 infrared cameras located inside and outside the club. Galam also had 26 air conditioners installed for $187,000. The building's copper wiring, which thieves had stolen during its long closure, was also replaced. Galam said the club would be free of violence. Galam also planned a reality documentary television series about the club's reopening and its employees, although the series was not produced.

On February 11, 2014, a judge ruled that Galam had purchased the rights to the "Crazy Horse" name when he bought the club. The club reverted to its previous name on the following day. Five people were arrested for prostitution at the club on March 13, 2014. Under Galam's ownership, the club suffered a lack of business, and was criticized for an inadequate video surveillance system. Problems continued at Crazy Horse Too after the sudden death of Galam's longtime girlfriend in April 2014, as Galam subsequently became inattentive in managing the club. The club had been operating with a temporary liquor license, but had amassed between 18 and 27 violations. In June 2014, Craig Franze joined as a part-owner, and a major remodeling of the club was completed.

In early August 2014, Galam was told by city officials that he would not be able to attain a permanent liquor license if he could not avoid future violations. At the advice of city officials and legal counsel, Galam withdrew his application for a permanent liquor license. Crazy Horse Too closed on August 23, 2014, after Galam's temporary liquor license expired. City officials also revoked the club's cabaret license, forcing the club's closure. Franze took over management of the closed property, along with Galam's father and sister: Victor Galam and Jackie Barnes.

The club continued to open once a month for eight hours to retain its erotic dance establishment license and land use rights, without serving alcohol. As of July 2019, the property had opened for eight hours under the name Sin City Teaser's Gentlemen's Club. By that time, the building was considered to be in disrepair and unsafe, with criminal activity frequently occurring on the property and requiring police assistance. Such activity included vagrant break-ins. In August 2019, the city council unanimously voted to revoke the erotic dance license as the club could not comply with municipal codes. The majority landowner and licensee wanted to remedy the issues, but the other owners hampered progress.

=== Fires and demolition (2022) ===
On the early morning of June 5, 2022, a fire broke out at the strip club and tore through the roof. The structure was heavily damaged, and a second fire occurred at the rear of the building later that month. A closed diner, connected to the club via the strip mall, caught on fire in July 2022. The fires were believed to have been started by homeless people living within the buildings. The city announced that it would proceed with demolition of the club and adjoining buildings on its own, as the property owner failed to secure the site. The property owner ultimately hired a demolition crew, and the club was torn down in December 2022.

== Other lawsuits ==
=== Scott Fau (1995) ===
In August 1995, an interstate truck driver named Scott Fau got into a fight with four bouncers at the club. The fight was taken outside and continued in the parking lot, where police and paramedics responded to stop the fighting. Fau, who was nearly dead, was found approximately three hours later near railroad tracks behind the club. Fau, who had a broken nose, foot, and leg, and a severe wound to the head, died shortly thereafter.

Fau's widow, Camille Fau, filed a wrongful death lawsuit against the four employees, two of whom died before the case went to trial. On January 13, 2003, after two days of deliberations, jurors found that the bouncers were not liable in Fau's death. According to testimony, just over 30 minutes had passed from the time the fight was stopped to the time the club employees arrived at a hospital for treatment of their broken hands. The jury felt that there was not enough time for a second beating to have taken place during those 30 minutes. Fau's attorney, disappointed with the verdict, said, "We had witnesses that were intimidated. We had witnesses who didn't show up. It just shows that the ongoing criminal activity of employees of the Crazy Horse Too is a lot more far-reaching than they would like people to believe."

=== Stripper lawsuit (1997) ===
In March 1997, two strippers filed a lawsuit against Crazy Horse Too, claiming they were not paid any minimum wage and were required to pay $30 of tip money to the club owner at the end of every work shift. The lawsuit sought $30,000 for each stripper who had worked at the club, as well as class action status to cover all strippers who had worked in Las Vegas strip clubs for the previous two years. Crazy Horse Too, which planned to countersue, denied the allegations: "This club receives no payment or income from entertainers who are hired as, and are treated as, independent contractors." The lawsuit was expanded to other strip clubs in June 1997, with Crazy Horse Too's attorney, Tony Sgro, responding, "we stand by our original assessment."

=== Brian Devlin (2001) ===
In March 2001, a man named Brian Devlin declined to pay an entertainer $600 for lap dances that he believed would only cost $100. As of January 2005, a lawsuit against the club was pending in District Court. Devlin alleged that after he refused to pay, he was escorted outside to the parking lot by several bouncers, who beat him until he was unconscious. Devlin claimed that he woke up covered in blood, with torn clothes and his wallet missing.

=== Eben Kostbar (2001) ===
In July 2001, a man named Eben Kostbar visited the club and offered to pay for a friend to receive a table dance. Kostbar refused to pay for the $40 dance, as he believed it was a $20 dance. Kostbar claimed that after exiting the club, he was beaten by multiple bouncers and doormen. Kostbar suffered a concussion and a contusion to his nose, and he had plastic surgery performed on his eye.

Kostbar filed a lawsuit against the club in September 2002, alleging "battery, infliction of emotional distress and negligent training and supervision and negligent infliction of emotional distress." In April 2003, Kostbar offered to settle the case for $140,000. The case was dismissed in September 2003, approximately one month before the trial was scheduled to begin.

=== Michael Silverman (2002) ===
A man named Michael Silverman attended the club with his wife in May 2002. While looking for his wife, Silverman got into an argument with a bouncer after saying that his wife had probably left with a stripper to obtain cocaine. The bouncer told Silverman not to say "cocaine" inside the club, and the bouncer hit Silverman after he repeated the word. The bouncer was cited for misdemeanor battery. Silverman sued the bouncer, Rick Rizzolo, and Crazy Horse Too for "pain and suffering caused by the assault, emotional distress, negligent hiring and punitive damages." By December 2002, the case had been settled.

== Film history ==
In October 2000, Crazy Horse Too was among scheduled filming locations for Legends in Las Vegas, an A&E documentary. Interior and exterior scenes were shot at the club in April 2001, for Ocean's Eleven. For filming at the club, Rick Rizzolo turned down an offer of $100,000 from the film's producers, which included longtime friend Jerry Weintraub. Rizzolo felt that the club's appearance in the film was enough.

In March 2003, scenes were expected to be shot at the club for the pilot episode of NBC's Las Vegas. In June 2006, scenes were shot at the club for Food Network's reality television series, The Family Restaurant.

== See also ==
- Las Vegas Dancers Alliance
- List of strip clubs
