= Las Vegas Dancers Alliance =

Former organization of adult entertainment workers

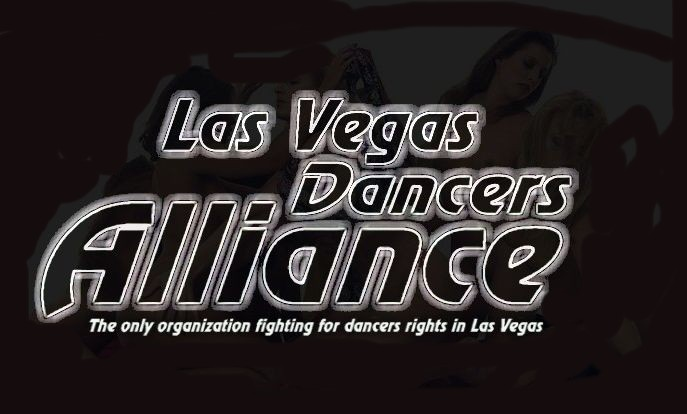
- LVDA Logo

- Zone of influence
- Abbreviation: LVDA
- Formation: 2002-08-01
- Dissolved: 2003-12-31
- Type: Advocacy
- Legal status: Association
- Purpose: Worker's Rights
- Headquarters: Las Vegas, Nevada
- Location: Las Vegas
- Region served: Southern Nevada
- Members: Adult Entertainment Workers
- President: Andrea Hackett
- Main organ: Assembly
- Affiliations: Progressive Leadership Alliance of Nevada (PLAN)
- Budget: N/A
- Website: No longer active
- Remarks: No longer active

The Las Vegas Dancers Alliance was an organization of adult entertainment workers in Las Vegas founded in 2002 by Andrea Hackett in response to regulations adopted by Clark County, Nevada, that criminalized lap dances. It grew to include 1,000 members from strip clubs throughout the Las Vegas valley including Crazy Horse Too, Spearmint Rhino and many others.

At the height of its power, L.V.D.A. was covered in media outlets across the globe including CNN, MSNBC, CBS News, Washington Post, LA Times, Seattle Times, and The Times of India. Hackett appeared on The O'Reilly Factor on September 18, 2002 to lobby her cause and was approached by Dateline, A&E, PBS, and ABC News. Her struggles were documented in Marc Cooper's book, The Last Honest Place in America. Hackett wrote a memoir in 2006 and has been interviewed for documentaries.

== Organization ==
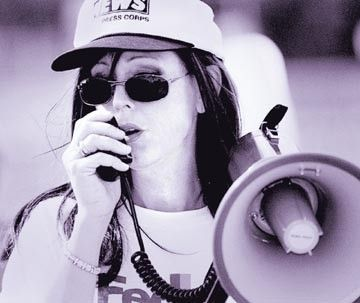
Andrea Hackett at a LVDA rally

Las Vegas Dancers Alliance was established as a non-profit corporation in Nevada in the summer of 2002. Its purpose was to advocate on behalf of adult entertainment workers and mediate issues between its members and management. By October, club representatives had been elected from twelve of the twenty-one strip clubs in the region and served as its board of directors. To lobby candidates and local officials, a political action committee was established (LVDA-PAC). A third organization was created in 2003, the Committee to Protect Dancing. That organization educated its members on the initiative process and coordinated a signature drive to overturn the so-called Lap Dance Ordinance.

In its short life (2002–2003) L.V.D.A. was credited with derailing efforts to institute business license fees for dancers in Clark County and efforts to prohibit the popular practice of G-string tipping. It also brought attention to unscrupulous industry practices such as house fees in excess of $100, dance fees, late fees, stage fees, missed stage fees, missed shift fees, mandatory tips for disc jockeys, valet parking, "house moms", and floorwalkers, and indiscriminate firings, as well as the practice of mandating work cards in Las Vegas that require FBI background checks for dancers. L.V.D.A. was the only organization of adult entertainment workers in Las Vegas to confront these issues.

== Media ==
=== Television ===
- Hackett, Andrea (2002-09-18). O'Reilly Factor. Fox News.
- Wilkinson, Carol (2002-07-31). "Commissioners OK Lap Dance Restrictions". Channel 8 News. KLAS-TV.
- Bruner, Shelley (2002-07-31). "New Rules Limit Lap Dancing". FOX5 News, Las Vegas. KVVU.
- Cesare, Cindy (2002-08-06). "Andrea Hackett interview". Channel 8 News. KLAS-TV.

=== Radio ===
- Murray, Bruce (2002-08-21). "New Rules Threaten Lap Dancing As We Know It". Murray In The Morning. Sporting News Radio.

=== Articles ===
- "Las Vegas Strippers Become Advocates". New York Times. 2002-01-04.
- "Lap Dance Rules Have Some Hot, Bothered". USA Today. 2002-08-19.
- "Lap Dance Rules Take Effect Sept. 1". Las Vegas Review Journal. 2002-08-01.
- Kalil, J. M. (2002-08-02). "County Okays Lap Dance Rules: New Regulations Less Stringent Than Initial Proposal". Las Vegas Review Journal.
- "Lap Dance Rules: Strippers Want to Be Heard" (Las Vegas Review Journal, Richard Lake, Aug. 4, 2002)
- "Sex, Not Gambling, Built Las Vegas, But We Remain Uneasy With It" (John L. Smith, Las Vegas Review Journal, Aug. 4, 2002)
- "Critics Say Lap-Dance Law Does Not Sit Well" (Las Vegas Sun, Adrienne Packer, Aug. 6, 2002)
- "New Lap Dance Ordinance" (Mercury Magazine, Aug. 1, 2002)
- "What I Saw at the Lap Dance Revolution" (Mercury Magazine, Aug. 2002)
- "Las Vegas Strippers Protest New County Law on Lap Dancing" (Reno Gazette Journal, Sept. 1, 2002)
- "LVDA Call to Reopen Lap Dance Debate" (Adult Industry News, Nov. 10, 2002)
- "Performers Unite to Save Sin City's topless tradition" - AP, January 4, 2003
- "Union Busting? Strippers Charge Cheetahs With Labor Violation" (LV Mercury, Lynette Curtis, Feb. 6, 2003) http://www.lasvegasmercury.com/2003/MERC-Feb-06-Thu-2003/20617480.html
- "LVDA Files Initiative" (Adult Industry News, Mar. 19, 2003) https://web.archive.org/web/20030820080758/http://ainews.com/Archives/Story4678.phtml
- "Tough Task? Dancer Can Hack It" (LV Sun, Susan Snyder, Mar. 23, 2003)
- "Vice Close Las Vegas Club" (Adult Industry News, Apr. 5, 2003) https://web.archive.org/web/20030820065453/http://ainews.com/Archives/Story4755.phtml
- "The Naked Truth: The Strange Life of Andrea Hackett" (CityLife Magazine, Apr. 17, 2003)
- "The Naked and The Red" by Marc Cooper (Nation Magazine, Apr. 21, 2003) http://www.thenation.com/doc/20030421/cooper
- "Hostess with the Most Zest" (Guardian Unlimited, Duncan Campbell, June 1, 2003)
- "Lap Dancer Strips Veil Off Las Vegas Casinos" (The Guardian, Duncan Campbell, June 18, 2003)
- "Union Between Dancers, Organized Labor Would be Timely Match" (John L. Smith, Las Vegas Review Journal, Aug. 10, 2005)
- "Strippers Need to Have a Role in Crafting Fair Regulations for Industry" (Las Vegas Review Journal, Opinion, Jan. 29, 2005)

=== Academic works ===
- Majic, Samantha (June 2005). LIVE! NUDE! Organized Workers? Examining the Organization of Sex Workers in Las Vegas, NV (PDF) (PhD). Cornell University.

=== Opinion pieces ===
- Hackett, Andrea (2003-03-20). "The Industry You Love To Hate". CityLife Magazine.
- "Naked Naivete". CityLife Magazine. 2003-11-27.
- "Strip Wars". Las Vegas Review Journal. 2004-09-11.
- "Articles". The Populist Party. Archived from the original on 2008-02-12.

== Gallery ==
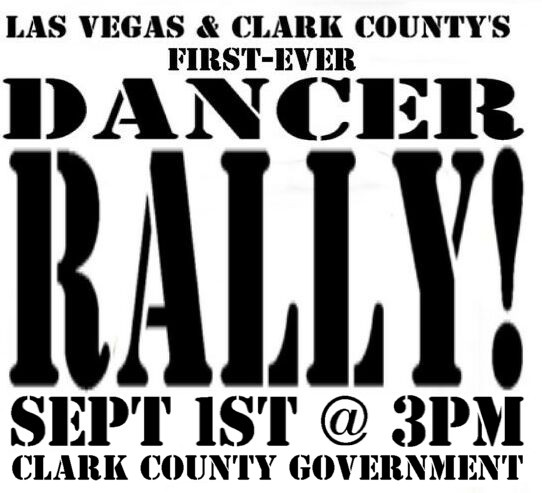
Original LVDA Dancer Rally poster

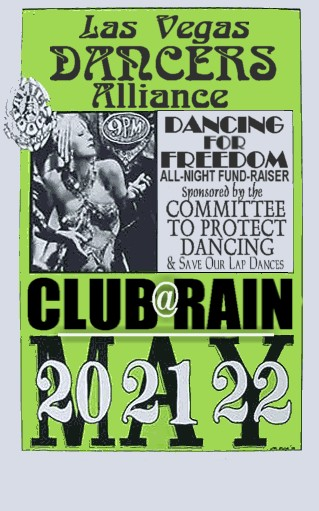
Dancing for Freedom Fundraiser, unknown year

== See also ==
- Lusty Lady
- Sex workers' rights
