= James Barrier =

American wrestling promoter

James "Buffalo Jim" Barrier
- Born: James Barrier; March 22, 1953; Cleveland, Ohio, U.S.
- Died: April 5, 2008 (aged 55); Las Vegas, Nevada, U.S.
- Occupations: Wrestling promoter, television personality, entrepreneur

James "Buffalo Jim" Barrier (March 22, 1953 – April 5, 2008) was an American wrestling promoter for National Wrestling Conference in Las Vegas from 1994 to 1998. His legal struggle with business owner and landlord Frederick "Rick" Rizzolo, who owned land occupied by Barrier's auto repair business, was covered by the media during the early 2000s.

== Career ==
Barrier moved to Las Vegas in 1971 from Cleveland, Ohio. He later opened an auto repair shop, Allstate Auto & Marine, on Industrial Road, near the Las Vegas Strip. The business was in operation until his death in 2008. In the late 1990s, he opened and operated a wrestling school, the Buffalo Wrestling Federation. The school was sometimes the site of his popular local TV show, Jim Wars, that aired on Friday nights. In addition to his auto repair business, wrestling school, and television show, Barrier wrote a weekly column on auto repair for the now defunct Las Vegas Mercury entitled “Nuts and Bold with Buffalo Jim.”

As a wrestling promoter, auto repair specialist, and entrepreneur, Barrier befriended numerous celebrities. Among them are Hulk Hogan, the Undertaker, boxer Muhammad Ali, and wrestling and film star Dwayne “The Rock” Johnson. Barrier also possessed a large collection of celebrity memorabilia, from vehicles to a lock of musician Elvis Presley's hair. In addition to smaller pieces in his collection, Barrier also sported a car collection that included a Jensen Interceptor once owned by singer Wayne Newton and a pink Cadillac that was later borrowed by musician Kid Rock as part of his proposal to Pamela Anderson in Las Vegas in 2002.

== Personal life ==
In 2005, Barrier was voted “Las Vegas’ Most Colorful Character” by the Las Vegas Review Journal, describing him as “a modern Renaissance man.” He was also a single father of four daughters.

== Legal dispute ==
Barrier was known in Las Vegas, because of media coverage, for winning a lengthy court dispute about parking spaces with his neighbor and landlord, Rick Rizzolo, former owner of the Crazy Horse Too gentlemen's club, located next door to Barrier's repair shop. Rizzolo was court ordered to sell the nightclub to satisfy debts. When the business did not sell, the U.S. Marshals Service seized the bar in September 2007, forcing its eventual closure. Rizzolo was released in late-March 2008 after serving a year in a federal prison on a racketeering and tax evasion conviction in U.S. Federal court.

Because of the government taking over the property, Barrier was forced to move. He was working with real estate professionals to secure a new location before he died.

== Death ==
On the morning of April 6, 2008, the body of James Barrier was found in a Motel 6 on Boulder Highway, an older section of Las Vegas near a residential area. According to police, Barrier was found lying in bed, face up, with an empty prescription bottle of Valium on the nightstand and his pants pulled down around his ankles. A woman only known as "Lisa" who was found and talked to who was in the room with Barrier that night told police that Barrier had a seizure, however she did not report it at the time and left as his seizure occurred. The official cause of death was ruled accidental, citing dilated cardiomyopathy. Between April 2008 and June 2008, statements by then-Clark County Coroner Michael Murphy, also stated traces of cocaine in Barrier's toxicology reports as a contributing factor to his death. Additionally, 20 mg of GHB was found in Barrier's system, but was not seen as a factor leading to his death.

== Suspicion of foul play ==
While Barrier's death was ruled accidental by officials, friends and family have publicly stated that Barrier's death was a murder and remains unsolved.

== Independent autopsy and coroner investigation ==
The Clark County Coroner and Las Vegas Metropolitan Police Department investigators did not suspect foul play in the death of Barrier and the scene of Barrier's death was not dusted for fingerprints.

A preliminary report to Barrier's family stated there were no signs of drugs or a heart attack in Barrier's body. A later autopsy report later stated that Barrier died of dilated cardiomyopathy (inflamed heart muscles). The Las Vegas Review Journal reported the following from then-Clark County Coroner Michael Murphy, DBA:

"Simms’ preliminary report indicated there were no signs of a heart attack, fueling the family's belief that Barrier died under suspicious circumstances.

Murphy said that when an individual dies from a heart attack, the heart muscle is dead.

Barrier had no dead muscles but had heart disease. In medical terms, he died from a heart disease combined with cocaine use, Murphy said, clarifying Simms’ findings."

Not satisfied with the findings of the Clark County Coroner, Barrier's family hired independent pathologist Dr. Rexene Worrell to perform an autopsy. Barrier's family was promised photographs, video, audio, and notes documenting the examination upon completion of the autopsy. Once completed, however, Worrell declined to provide the family with the findings, saying, “I need to hold on to the file in case it goes to court.” As of 2018, 10 years after the independent autopsy, the information obtained by Worrell concerning Barrier's body had yet to be released to the family.

In an effort to determine if Barrier had a recent history of drug use, Barrier's family requested that his body be exhumed to test hair samples from his body for drugs. The Clark County Coroner's office stated they had no plans to exhume Barrier's body and that such an action could only be done at the request of law enforcement for a criminal prosecution.

== "Death In a Vegas Motel" on the Unsolved Mysteries revival on Netflix ==
On October 25, 2022, the Netflix revival of the television show Unsolved Mysteries about murders and paranormal encounters aired an episode on Barrier's death titled "Death in a Vegas Motel." Through interviews with his family members, friends, and others with knowledge of the case, the episode showcased some previously unknown details from Barrier's case that had been withheld from the news media and the public after Barrier's death in 2008 by the Las Vegas Metropolitan Police Department and the Clark County Office of the Coroner and Medical Examiner.

=== Seven minute check-in discrepancy ===
According to the Motel 6 security cameras on Saturday, April 5, 2008, Barrier was seen in the motel lobby checking into Room 105 at 8:22PM (a receipt for the room also notes the time of check-in as 8:22PM). He is then seen exiting the lobby at 8:24PM. However, the key card log at the Motel 6 shows that Room 105 (the room Barrier was given) was accessed by a guest key at 8:15PM, seven minutes prior to Barrier checking into his room. The next entry on the key card log for Room 105 was when housekeeping first found him the next day on April 6. This would mean that Barrier entered Room 105 seven minutes before he checked into the Motel 6 and received his key card to Room 105.

Reports obtained by Barrier's family from the Las Vegas Metropolitan Police Department, there is no mention of this backwards time jump. In fact, the reports indicate that the investigating detectives do not account for, nor do they make any attempt to reconcile this time discrepancy.

=== "White powdery substance" not tested ===
When Barrier was found in the motel room, the coroner investigator and police investigators stated that there was a "white powdery substance" on Barrier's shirt and beard. While cocaine was found in Barrier's system, the reports from both the coroner and law enforcement indicate that the "white powdery substance" found on his beard and shirt were never tested to determine if it was actually cocaine. The substance was also never matched with the cocaine found in Barrier's system.

In the episode, family and friends state that Barrier had been clean from using illicit drugs and alcohol for over a decade. Barrier's family and friends believe that Barrier may have been forced to ingest the cocaine that was found in his system.

Pictures of the motel room as well as reports from the coroner and law enforcement indicate that no cocaine or other drug paraphernalia was found in the room. The only place any "white powdery substance" was found was on Barrier's shirt and beard.

== Funeral and burial ==
Barrier's funeral was on April 12, 2008, at the Palm Downtown Mortuary and Cemetery. The following is a description of the mourners who came to show their respects:

Before he was to be buried, four weeks ago, the great multitudes filed into the Palms Mortuary in the old part of Las Vegas to see Buffalo Jim Barrier one final time. They arrived in endless droves: midgets, wrestlers, Hells Angels, Native American Indians of unadulterated descent, lawyers, journalists, world-renowned neurosurgeons—the lame and the homeless—politicians, bankers, television executives, men who had more money than God, boxers, leviathans, Elvis impersonators, those like Buffalo who fixed cars and who arrived with fresh grease smeared across their jumpsuits, sinners, celebrities, folks as old as Vegas itself and young babes just born into the city this Spring.

Barrier's grave is located at the Palm Downtown Cemetery at 36.184451, -115.135685.
