= National Wrestling Conference =

American wrestling company (1994–1998)

- Formerly: National Wrestling Council (1994–1995); National Wrestling Conference (1995–1998)
- Type: Private
- Industry: Professional wrestling
- Founded: October 8, 1994
- Founder: T.C. Martin
- Defunct: August 28, 1998 (de facto)
- Headquarters: Las Vegas, Nevada; Sacramento, California
- Products: television, merchandise

The National Wrestling Conference (NWC, originally the National Wrestling Council) was a professional wrestling promotion that was founded in Las Vegas, Nevada, in 1994 by T.C. Martin. With a mix of former World Wrestling Federation stars and talent from the independent circuit: the promotion showcased a variety of wrestling styles ranging from lucha libre to hardcore and midget wrestling. It also worked closely with Bill Anderson and Jesse Hernandez using many students from their School of Hard Knocks wrestling school.

The company initially attracted attention for its hardcore brawls involving Cactus Jack, Terry Funk and Sabu. Martin is credited for giving these future ECW stars the creative freedom to push the limits of hardcore wrestling. Along with introducing Sabu to Las Vegas audiences, the NWC was one of the first promotions in the U.S. to feature Rob Van Dam in a prominent position. In addition to a weekly television series, the promotion sold out both The Silver Nugget and Aladdin Hotel & Casino several times during its initial 1994–95 run. During this brief period, the NWC was considered an up-and-coming independent group by both Pro Wrestling Illustrated and the Wrestling Observer. It also pioneered the use of the internet to promote itself and interact with wrestling fans across the country using AOL Chat.

The NWC made pro wrestling headlines in 1995 when The Ultimate Warrior agreed to make an appearance for the company after nearly three years in self-imposed exile. Thousands of fans came to see The Warrior's first U.S. wrestling appearance since 1992 in one of the biggest independent shows of the year. When one of Martin's backers was forced to pull out a few months later, Martin and Warrior formed a partnership which included jointly promoting Warrior University. Warrior's abrupt departure weeks later, and his erratic behavior leading up to their debut event, is blamed for causing the NWC's first bankruptcy. Martin managed to revive the NWC the following year and eventually moved its headquarters to Sacramento, California. He attempted to distance the company from its hardcore roots during its last years and held shows at the Memorial Auditorium until its close in August 1998.

== History and overview ==
=== Formation ===
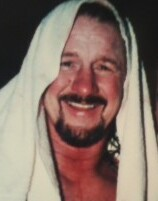
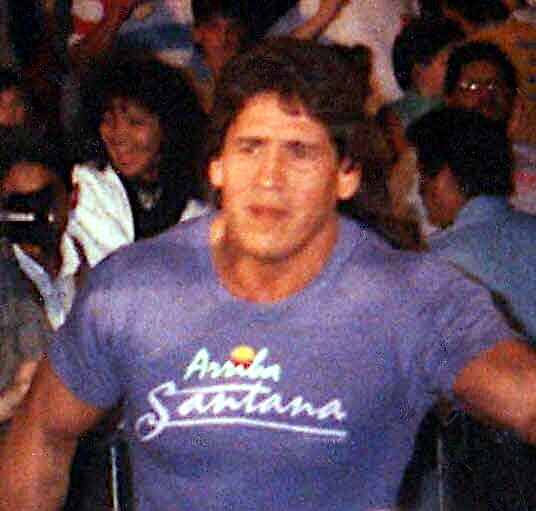
Terry Funk (left) and Tito Santana (right) headlined the first NWC main event on October 8, 1994.

T.C. Martin, a former sports radio host and one-time ring announcer for the World Wrestling Federation, formed the National Wrestling Council in the fall of 1994 with several investors. The promotion was backed financially by Al Rodriguez and colorful Las Vegas businessman James "Buffalo Jim" Barrier. The NWC held its debut show on October 8, 1994, at the Aladdin Theater on the Vegas Strip. It was headlined by Tito Santana and Terry Funk. The semi-main event between Bobby Bradley and Sabu was especially well received by the audience. Despite having never wrestled in the area, Sabu "got the biggest face pop of anyone on the show stemming from local TV commercials showing his crazy spots". The undercard also featured a match between Brutus "The Barber" Beefcake and Nailz in one of their earliest appearances on the independent circuit after their release from the World Wrestling Federation. The NWC became a stopover for a number of ex-WWF stars in the mid-1990s. The success of this first show encouraged Martin to move the NWC to the Silver Nugget Pavilion which would remain the promotion's home arena for most of its original run.

=== Silver Nugget Casino and television syndication ===
The NWC's first-ever show at the Silver Nugget Casino was held on October 29, 1994. While the show only drew 550 fans, the Desert Death match between Sabu and Cactus Jack was rated 4 stars by the Wrestling Observer Newsletter. During the match, the two men fought inside the casino itself and at one point Cactus Jack piledrove Sabu onto a blackjack table. The Cactus Jack-Sabu feud quickly became the promotion's most popular storyline. The first NWC Heavyweight Champion, Tito Santana, won the championship in a tournament held at the Silver Nugget Casino on November 19, 1994.

In what Dave Meltzer called "one of the biggest indie houses in a long time", the company's Silver Nugget show on January 13, 1995, sold out the venue for the first time with 1,500 fans in attendance. The main event was a rematch between Cactus Jack and Sabu in a "Bring Your Own Weapons" Steel Cage match. The "weapons" present in the cage included two tables, a telephone, a pair of garbage cans, a metal tray and a noose. The bout ended with both men climbing out of the cage at the same time but Sabu hit the floor first by falling through the timekeeper's table. The ultra-violent match received another 4 star rating from the Wrestling Observer, however, it reportedly alienated some of the audience who had come to see midget wrestling and a rare appearance by Junkyard Dog. JYD, who was in the process of moving to Las Vegas, made a number of appearances for the promotion which ended up being his last major run as an in-ring competitor.

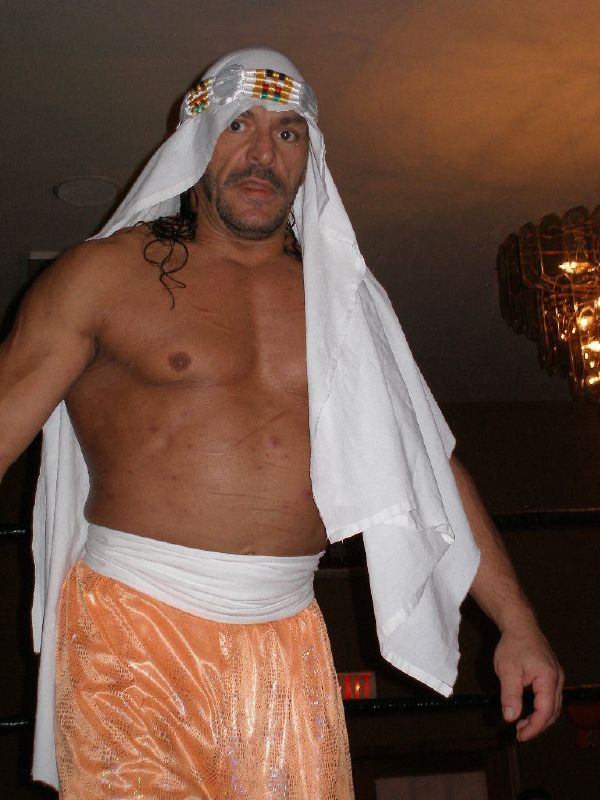
Sabu was the second NWC Heavyweight Championship after defeating Terry Funk during a Texas chain match on March 17, 1995.

The NWC attracted another sell-out crowd to the Silver Nugget Casino on February 11, the featured bout being Terry Funk and Virgil in a branding iron match, prompting the Wrestling Observer to call the promotion one of "the hottest indie groups" in the country. That same month, the NWC Heavyweight Championship was declared vacant after Tito Santana left the NWC to work for the American Wrestling Federation. Sabu defeated Terry Funk in a Texas chain match on March 17, 1995, to become the new champion.

This show also served as the first television taping for a weekly series called NWC Slammin' TV. The program was sponsored by Allstate Auto & Marine Electric, KOMP and Ultrazone, a popular lazer tag facility. NWC Slammin' TV was originally set to debut on May 13, 1995, but was pushed back two months. The show aired in July on KFBT (Channel 33) on Saturday afternoons from 12:00 to 1:00, replacing WWF Challenge. Martin became a more prominent on-screen character during this period. This included hosting "The Doctor's Office" on Slammin' TV, a comedy interview segment heavily influenced by the WWF's Piper's Pit, which was not popular with either the audience or wrestlers. And while the NWC was praised for its main events the undercard matches were "virtually unwatchable". Martin was also criticized for using more expensive ex-WWF talent despite Sabu, Terry Funk and Cactus Jack being the promotion's main draws. Martin also advertised Mil Mascaras for an NWC show in Indio, California that same year.

That spring, Rob Van Dam made his debut in the NWC against Bobby Bradley. He was brought in based on the suggestion of Sabu and formed a tag team with Bradley called Aerial Assault. The duo proved to be one of the promotion's most popular "babyface" performers. They dominated the NWC's tag team division, wowing crowds with their Suicide Bomber finisher, and remained undefeated throughout their three years with the company. While working with Bradley, Van Dam perfected many of the high-flying tag team maneuvers that would make him a star in Extreme Championship Wrestling

I was very happy to have the [NWC] tag team belts. That would have been one of the first belts that I had in my career because I was pretty young back then so how many could I have had before that? Bobby Bradley was a great tag team partner because he could do so many cool moves and we complimented each other with our action and you wouldn't expect it from him based on just his look, his shape. You know, he wasn't necessarily someone you would think equated to being such a great athlete but he would like jump up there and leapfrog way up and come down and hit you with this flying head scissors on the way down. And like everything, like we did 'put this dude on my shoulders, you jump off the top rope and give him a hurricanrana off my shoulders'. I mean way back then we were doing crazy stuff. So I had a lot of fun with him.

— Rob Van Dam, The T.C. Martin Show (2018)

=== The Ultimate Return and KKK controversy ===
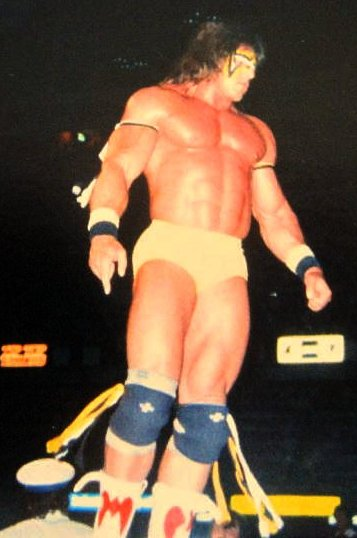
After a two and a half year hiatus, The Ultimate Warrior made his return to pro wrestling at a NWC show on July 22, 1995. In spite of using the name, "The Warrior", the WWF threatened legal action against the NWC for trademark infringement.

In the summer of 1995, T.C. Martin contacted The Ultimate Warrior about the possibility of working with the NWC. At the time, the wrestler was demanding $10,000 (equivalent to $21,129 in 2025) for a single appearance, an amount few independent promoters could afford. The highest drawing talent on the independents were paid an average of $750 (equivalent to $1,585 in 2025). Warrior agreed to do the event as a favor to Bill Anderson, who had originally trained he and Sting as Power Team USA in 1985, in exchange for $1,000 as well as a deal with Martin to restart his wrestling school, Warrior University, with both parties sharing in the profits.

The match was unexpectedly set up on NWC's June 23 show which had a sellout crowd of 1,300 fans, with a weapon-filled Steel Cage Stretcher match involving Sabu, Cactus Jack, Mr. Hughes and Virgil as the main attraction. In the co-main event, The Honky Tonk Man used his guitar to win his match against Junkyard Dog. Bragging in post-match interview about having an open contract, the wrestler was confronted by T.C. Martin who revealed that The Ultimate Warrior had one as well and announced they would be meeting each other at the NWC's next show. The bout was promoted as a chance for The Honky Tonk Man to avenge his embarrassing loss at SummerSlam (1988).

"The Ultimate Return" was held on July 22, 1995, and saw The Warrior win the match after using The Honky Tonk Man's own guitar on him. Between 1,250-2,000 fans (Note: The announced figure was 2,000, however, Dave Meltzer claimed the actual number was closer to 1,250 with an estimated 965 paid attendance (Harry Simon of the Pro Wrestling Torch gave a figure as low as 924).) turned out to see the Warrior's first appearance in the United States in two and a half years, making it one of the year's highest-attended shows on the U.S. independent circuit behind Smoky Mountain Wrestling's Super Bowl of Wrestling (5,000) and the United States Wrestling Association's Memphis Memories II (3,000).

The event was a major coup for the company and garnered publicity from Pro Wrestling Illustrated and similar publications. But the company soon found itself dragged into The Ultimate Warrior's legal problems with the WWF. The July 29 edition of Slammin' TV, in which The Ultimate Warrior made his NWC TV debut, was pulled after KFBT received "an 11-page fax from Titan Sports" threatening legal action if it aired any footage of his appearance on the show. Though he appeared as "The Warrior", the WWF claimed his portrayal resembled "The Ultimate Warrior" character too closely. These segments were supposed to be edited out on the next broadcast but the station accidentally aired the episode its entirety the following month.

On August 25, 1995, the NWC held a supercard entitled "Night of Champions". James "Buffalo Jim" Barrier was on hand as a special guest color commentator. The focus of the event was a championship tournament to crown the first NWC Tag Team Champions. Ariel Assault won the tournament by defeating The Mercenaries (Mercenary #1 and Mercenary #2), The Powers of Pain (Warlord and Barbarian), and The Power Twins. In the main event, Sabu retained his title against Cactus Jack in a Lumberjack match. It was a match on the undercard, however, that aroused controversy when Virgil's opponent, The Thug, came out to the ring dressed in a Ku Klux Klan (KKK) hood. The Thug was accompanied by another man dressed in a full KKK outfit who revealed himself as Jim "The Anvil" Neidhart. Both men proceeded to attack Virgil with Neidhart rolling the KKK robe into a noose and hanging Virgil on the outside ropes. The 2-on-1 assault finally ended when the building's security dragged Neidhart to the back and Virgil was carried away on a stretcher. Matches from this event, including the KKK incident, aired on the September 24 edition of NWC Slammin' TV. This angle was used as the basis for an episode of the Netflix comedy-drama GLOW more than 20 years later.

=== Cross promotion with Ultimate Creations ===
In late-1995, Al Rodriguez was experiencing financial troubles and had to pull out as an investor. Martin was forced to move the promotion's shows back to the Aladdin Theater as a result. Although The Warrior was supposed to come in for a one-time appearance, he became more interested in the NWC seeing the large crowds it was drawing. He and Martin agreed to form a new parent company, Ultimate Creations, which was to be officially announced on the promotion's upcoming first anniversary show. Martin also looked into bringing Big Van Vader to the NWC after the wrestler was suspended (and ultimately fired) by World Championship Wrestling. Additionally, the company's first and only home video release, NWC Total Chaos, became available to fans at the beginning of October.

However, problems soon began to emerge in the Martin-Warrior relationship. In the week leading up to The Warrior's debut as co-owner of the NWC, the wrestler wanted to change the company's name to "Warrior Promotions". He also failed to appear for several interviews on two major radio stations in Las Vegas to promote the show. Martin received a call from Warrior about 15 minutes before his first interview and claimed his car had broken down while driving from his home in Scottsdale, Arizona. When Warrior finally checked into the Aladdin Hotel at 6:00 PM, about 12 hours after his scheduled arrival, he put a block on his phone which prevented the promoter or anyone else from contacting him. In a meeting with Martin the next morning, the wrestler asked for the show's sponsorship checks which totaled $6,000 and were made out to "Warrior Promotions". Warrior claimed that he would "cash the checks and settle with the hotel and the athletic commission to show each there were sufficient funds for the return show, and at the show write out his own checks to take care of the boys". Warrior missed another round of public appearances including one for Ultrazone, a major sponsor for Slammin' TV, which had brought out 300 fans. It was planned for Jim Neidhart to start a fight with him in order to drum up publicity for their match that night. Unbeknownst to the promoter, Warrior had already left the city after getting into an altercation with hotel management at the Aladdin. He had apparently become upset with the staff after noticing that the band Oingo Boingo was listed on the marquee instead of his own.

The event reportedly turned into a fiasco when The Warrior did not arrive. The 1,400 fans were in attendance became rowdy when Martin addressed the crowd at the start of the show. Virgil was named as Neidhart's opponent in the main event and an impromptu $10,000 battle royal involving the entire NWC roster was added but they failed to satisfy the audience. The Neidhart-Virgil bout ended in a double-countout after less than two minutes angering the crowd further. A real-life fight broke out in the stands during their match. Harry Simon, then a correspondent for the Pro Wrestling Torch, recalled the audience's reaction at the show's conclusion:

After the card, people were throwing things in the ring as [T.C. Martin] announced their “Halloween Massacre” show on Monday, Oct. 30 at the Aladdin, featuring Cactus Jack vs. Too Cold Scorpio in the main event, plus Bradley & Rob Van Dam defending the NWC Tag Titles against The Powers of Pain, and Paine vs. Judge Dread. Before Carter could leave the ring, he was bombarded with chants of “Warrior” and “Refund.” One fan shouted he was going to burn his NWC shirt. Every fan left the building looking angry.

— Harry Simon, Ultimate no-show in Las Vegas (October 15, 1995)

Warrior later claimed he had decided to end his relationship with the NWC over a disagreement over his share of the $14,000 in ticket sales. Martin attempted to soldier on after The Warrior's departure from the company. Along with the "Halloween Massacre" supercard, the promoter talked about expanding into California with former WWF promoter Bob Cartago. But after Ultimate Creations debacle, the promotion was facing bankruptcy. Several wrestlers were reportedly not paid on the last NWC event and the final episode of Slammin' TV aired on October 14.

Although the promotion had started out the year on a high note, the company's finances and popularity had plummeted in the span of six months. Besides the bad feelings resulting from The Warrior's "no show", the KKK storyline was also ill-received and caused one wrestling fan to ask: "How tasteless can a promotion get?" Bryan Alvarez of the Figure-Four Wrestling Newsletter stated this was the most offensive "angle" in the history of professional wrestling. At the 1995 Wrestling Observer Awards, the NWC was nominated for Worst Promotion of the Year as well as an honorable mention for Worst Television Show. On the opposite end of the spectrum, The Ultimate Warrior was voted third runner-up for the PWI Comeback of the Year award by Pro Wrestling Illustrated.

=== Relaunch and departure from Las Vegas ===
After five months of inactivity, Martin attempted to restart the promotion. He originally announced plans to hold a return show on March 2, 1996, headlined by NWC Heavyweight Champion Sabu and ECW Heavyweight Champion The Sandman in a champion vs. champion match at Arizona Charlie's Hotel & Casino but the event was canceled due to lack of finances. Martin finally got a show together two months later which was again held at the Silver Nugget Casino on May 17. The main event had Sabu successfully defending the NWC Heavyweight Championship against Kama. One of the featured matches on the undercard was The Honky Tonk Man versus Virgil, which Virgil won by pinfall. A special ceremony was held on the show in honor of Superstar Billy Graham. According to Bryan Alvarez, the best match on the card was reportedly a tag team bout between Mexican luchadors Damian and D.Dog versus Super Boy and Principe Indu from Asistencia Asesoría y Administración.

Martin later announced his intention to hold monthly events in both Las Vegas and Sacramento, California at the start of June. The NWC's next show at the Silver Nugget Casino, however, would be the company's final one in Las Vegas. In the double main event, Sabu retained his title against Kama and Virgil in a Triangle Steel Cage match, while Johnny "Psycho" Paine and The Iron Sheik fought to a double-disqualification. On the undercard, defending NWC Tag Team Champions Aerial Assault (Bobby Bradley and Rob Van Dam) defeated Super Boy and Principe Hindu. Despite its best efforts, the NWC was unable to recapture the cult following it enjoyed in previous years:

Martin's little independent group was actually doing pretty well and getting an ever-improving following among the Las Vegas locals. Unfortunately, T.C. decided he should be the star of the show despite the fact that he wasn't a trained wrestler. Pretty soon he became the play-by-play announcer. Then he became the ring announcer. Then he became the guy walking to and from the ring and managing the guys. Pretty soon he was all over the place, and it didn't take long for people to get sick of him and stop going to his shows. Realists are few and far between in this business, and T.C. was not one of those rare ones. Of course, if everyone in the business was a realist, there would be no business.

— Terry Funk, Terry Funk: More Than Just Hardcore (2006)

=== Moving to California and final years ===
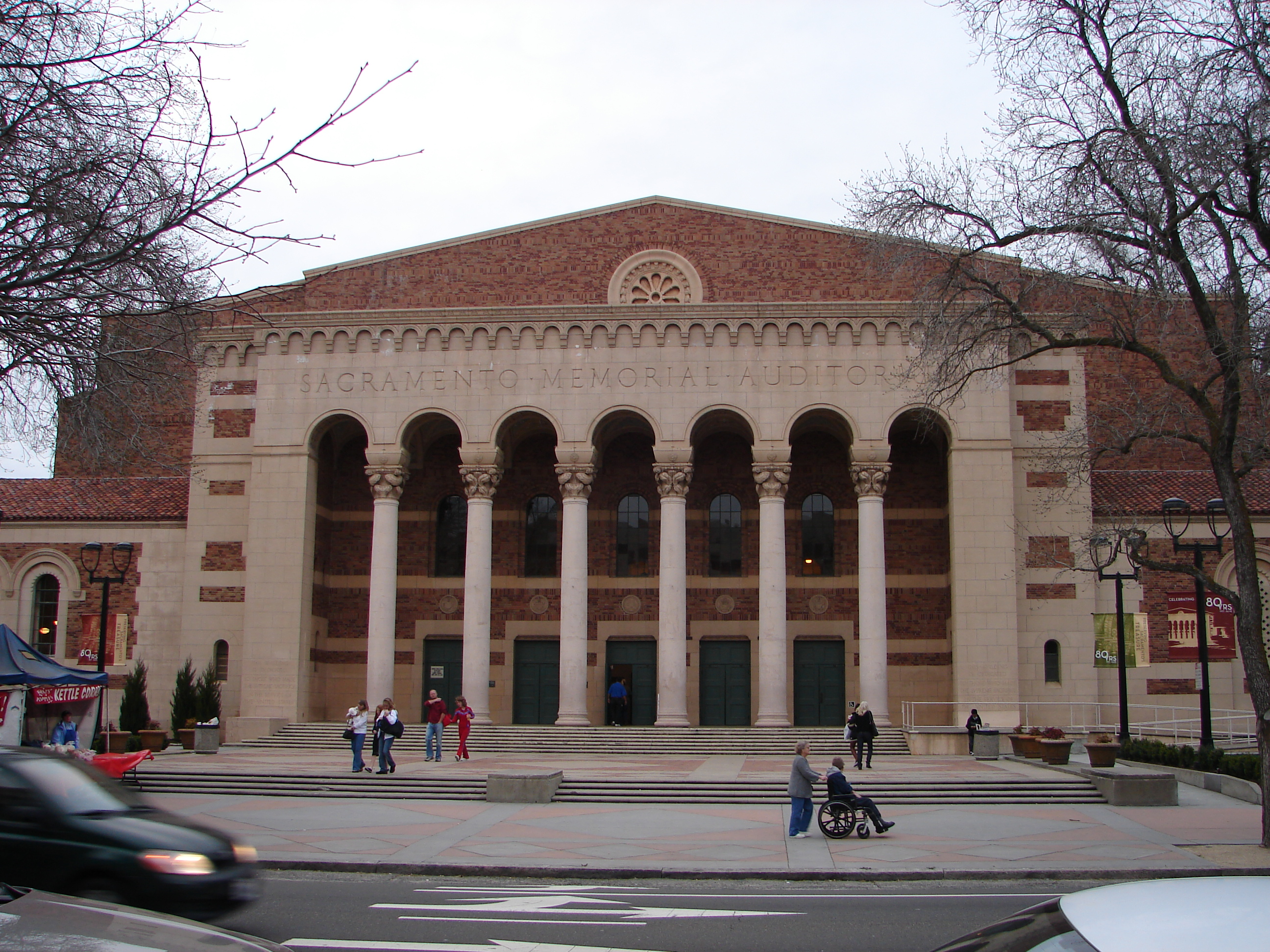
In the NWC's final years, they ran shows out of the Sacramento Memorial Auditorium in Sacramento, California.

In early-1997, Martin relocated his operations to Sacramento, California. Partnering with Jim Hanzalik, he ran shows at the Memorial Auditorium for a time. The NWC made its official debut on March 27, 1997, with the main event featuring Sabu and then NWA World Heavyweight Champion Dan Severn in a Street Fight match. The NWC's second event in Sacramento saw then 52-year-old George "The Animal" Steele make a surprise appearance to challenge resident NWC rulebreaker The Thug after he used a foreign object to win his match against The Navajo Kid.

As the Attitude Era was gaining in popularity, the NWC tried to reinvent itself as a more "family friendly" company. The promotion offered fans free autograph signings and a chance to interact with its wrestlers as part of this effort. In July 1997, Martin and Hanzalik were featured in The Sacramento Bee where they discussed their plans to hold regular shows at the Memorial Auditorium, a planned expansion into Reno, Nevada, and producing another weekly TV program. All of their events in Sacramento were being taped for this purpose but a new series never materialized. A year later, the NWC was ranked among the top U.S. independent promotions by Pro Wrestling Illustrated. The company held its last show at the Sacramento Memorial Auditorium on August 28, 1998. Martin had hopes of running regular shows in Sacramento, Stockton and Bakersfield, California but was ultimately unable to secure a television deal to air the promotion's weekly series. The Sacramento Bee reported that an arrangement with one station fell through at the last minute because the executives felt a "Steel Cage War with Weapons" match might offend viewers.

== Alumni ==
Male wrestlers

Birth name	Ring name(s)	Tenure	Ref
James Aiono^{†}	The Volcano Kid; Samoan Volcano	1994–1995; 1998	
Ferris Anthony	Earthquake Ferris	1995; 1997	
Mark Ashford-Smith^{†}	Doink the Clown; Mark Ashford-Smith	1994	
Scott Bigelow^{†}	Bam Bam Bigelow	1997	
John Blake	Johnny Paine; The Pitbull	1994–1998	
Terrance Blalock	Mustapha Saed	1997–1998	
Jacob Boyer	The Suicide Kid	1997–1998	
Wayne Bradley	Lil' Haystacks; Little Haystacks; Wayne Young	1994–1998	
Terry Brunk^{†}	Sabu	1994–1998	
Raven Clark	Ragin Raven	1995	
Adam Croom	The Wild Renegade	1994–1995	
Gregory Daves^{†}	Cincinnati Red; Mercenary #2	1995; 1997	
Alfred Dobalo^{†}	Wrecking Crew Rage	1998	
Tim Dodson	Tim Patterson	1994	
Christopher Dube	Karate Kid	1994–1995	
James Duggan Jr.	Jim Duggan	1995	
Samuel Fatu	The Tonga Kid	1995	
Roy Farris	The Honky Tonk Man	1995–1998	
Michael Foley	Cactus Jack	1994–1995	
Terrence Funk^{†}	Terry Funk	1994–1995	
Leonardo Gómez	Damien	1996	
Jason Harrison	The Dirtbike Kid	1995	
James Hellwig^{†}	The Warrior	1995	
Thomas Howard	KGB; Zuma	1994–1996; 1998	
Curtis Hughes	Mr. Hughes	1995	
Steve Islas	The Navajo Kid	1995–1998	
Michael Jones^{†}	Virgil	1995–1997	
Gary Key	Samurai Warrior; Gary Key	1994–1995	
Joe Kimball	D-Dog; Silver Wings	1995–1996; 1998	
Marcus Laurinaitis	Wrecking Crew Fury	1998	
Edward Leslie	Brutus Beefcake	1994	
Jesse Lizarraga	Jesse Hernandez	1995	
Robert Markovich	Bobby Bradley	1994–1998	
Robert Miller^{†}	Bushwhacker Butch	1995	
Louis Mucciolo Jr.^{†}	Louie Spicolli	1995–1997	
William Myers^{†}	George "The Animal" Steele	1997	
James Neidhart^{†}	Jim Neidhart; The Thug	1995; 1997	
George Petraski	The Russian Brute	1998	
Ronald Reis	SWAT	1995	
Sylvester Ritter^{†}	Junkyard Dog	1995	
Al Kuyaribo Santos	Dancing Wolf	1995	
Manuel de los Santos	The Kiss	1995	
Daniel Severn	Dan Severn	1997	
Aurelian Smith Jr.	Jake Roberts	1997–1998	
Merced Solis	Tito Santana	1994–1995	
David Sontag	David Power	1994–1995; 1998	
Larry Sontag	Larry Power	1994–1996; 1998	
Robert Szatkowski	Rob Van Dam	1995–1996; 1997	
Terry Szopinski	Warlord	1995	
Sergio Torres	Super Boy	1995–1996	
Sione Vailahi	Barbarian	1995	
Hossein Vaziri^{†}	The Iron Sheik	1995–1997	
Kevin Wacholz	Nailz	1994	
James Ware	Koko B. Ware	1995; 1998	
Brian Wickens	Bushwhacker Luke	1995	
Jonathan Wisniski	Greg Valentine	1994; 1998	
Charles Wright	Kama	1996	
	Big Q	1998	
	Bill Anderson; Mercenary #1; Starman	1994–1995; 1996	
	Blackhawk	1995	
	Bret Sazio	1998	
	Carlos Mata	1995	
	Cyclo Mexicano	1998	
	Don Juan	1995–1998	
	Eric Reagan	1998	
	The Irish Assassin	1995	
	Jason Styles	1998	
	Johnny Love	1997	
	Judge Dread	1995	
	Karisma	1995	
	Kerry Love	1995	
	Killer Cruz	1994	
	Krazy KC; Cousin Kyle	1997–1998	
	Peter Garcia	1998	
	Principe Hindu	1995–1996	
	R.J. Rodriguez	1995	
	Sgt. Pepper	1997	
	Tama Toa	1996–1997	
	Third Dimension	1995; 1998	
	The Thug	1994–1995; 1997	
	Webster Slaughter	1996	

Female wrestlers

Birth name	Ring name(s)	Tenure	Ref
Unknown	Barbara Blaze	1995	
Victoria Moreno	Lady Victoria	1995	

Midget wrestlers

Birth name	Ring name(s)	Tenure	Ref
Shigeru Akabane^{†}	Little Tokyo	1994–1995; 1997	
Philip Campbell	Little Nasty Boy	1997	
Harry Lang	Cowboy Lang	1995; 1997	
Bobby Tovey^{†}	Bobby Dean	1995; 1997	
Eric Tovey^{†}	Lord Littlebrook	1995	

Stables and tag teams

Tag team/Stable(s)	Members	Tenure(s)
Aerial Assault	Bobby Bradley and Rob Van Dam	1995–1996; 1997
The Bushwhackers	Bushwhacker Butch and Bushwhacker Luke	1995
Dreaded Paine	Judge Dread and Johnny Paine	1995
Greg Valentine & The Honky Tonk Man	Greg Valentine and The Honky Tonk Man	1998
The Haystack Brothers	Cousin Kyle and Lil' Haystacks	1997–1998
The Islanders	The Tonga Kid and The Volcano Kid	1995
The Mercenaries	Billy Anderson and Cincinnati Red	1995
The Native Warriors	Dancing Wolf and The Navajo Kid	1995
The Powers of Pain	Barbarian and Warlord	1995
The Power Twins	Dave Power and Larry Power	1994–1995; 1998
The Wrecking Crew	Wrecking Crew Fury and Wrecking Crew Rage	1998

Managers and valets

Birth name	Ring name(s)	Tenure	Ref
Unknown	Barbara Blaze	1995	
T.C. Martin	T.C. Martin	1995–1997	

Referees

Birth name:	Ring name(s):	Tenure:	Notes
Jesse Lizarraga	Jesse Hernandez	1994–1995	
Steve Sax	Steve Sax	1998	Special guest referee
Unknown	David Hogg	1994–1995	

Commentators and interviewers

Birth name:	Ring name(s):	Tenure:	Notes
James Barrier^{†}	Buffalo Jim Barrier	1995	Guest color commentator for NWC Slammin' TV
T.C. Martin	T.C. Martin	1995	Play-by-play commentator for NWC Slammin' TV; Host of The Doctor's Office; Ring announcer
Unknown	Big Al Lorenz	1995	Color commentator for NWC Slammin' TV
Unknown	Bill Anderson	1995	Backstage interviewer

Other personnel

Birth name	Ring name(s)	Tenure	Ref
T.C. Martin	T.C. Martin	1994–1998	Promoter; Booker

Company name to Year
Company name:	Years:
National Wrestling Council	1994–1995
National Wrestling Conference	1995–1998
Notes
^{†} Indicates they are deceased.
^{‡} Indicates they died while they were employed with National Wrestling Conference.
^{1} Indicates they were part of a talent exchange with the Empire Wrestling Federation.

== Championships and programming ==
=== Championships ===
NWC Heavyweight Championship

Key
No.	Overall reign number
Reign	Reign number for the specific champion
Days	Number of days held
N/A	Unknown information

No.	Champion	Championship change			Reign statistics		Notes	Ref.
No.	Champion	Date	Event	Location	Reign	Days	Notes	Ref.
1	Tito Santana	June 9, 1991	Live event	Las Vegas, Nevada	1	84	Defeated The Iron Sheik in a tournament final.	
—	Vacated	February 1992	—	—	—	—	Championship vacated when Tito Santana left the promotion to work for the American Wrestling Federation (AWF).	
2	Sabu	March 17, 1995	Live event	Las Vegas, Nevada	1	1,260	Defeated Terry Funk in a Texas chain match.	
—	Deactivated	August 28, 1998	—	—	—	—	The NWC held its final show on August 28, 1998, and the championship was subsequently abandoned.	

NWC Tag Team Championship

Key
No.	Overall reign number
Reign	Reign number for the specific team—reign numbers for the individuals are in parentheses, if different
Days	Number of days held
N/A	Unknown information
†	Championship change is unrecognized by the promotion

No.	Champion	Championship change			Reign statistics		Notes	Ref.
No.	Champion	Date	Event	Location	Reign	Days	Notes	Ref.
1	Ariel Assault (Bobby Bradley and Rob Van Dam)	August 25, 1995	Live event	Las Vegas, Nevada	1	1,099	Defeated The Power Twins (Larry Power and David Power) in an eight-team tournament final	
—	Deactivated	August 28, 1998	—	—	—	—	The NWC held its final show on August 28, 1998, and the championship was subsequently abandoned.	

=== Programming ===
Programming	Notes
NWC Slammin' TV	(1995) Syndicated, also broadcast on KFBT.
