= Lap dance =

Type of erotic dance

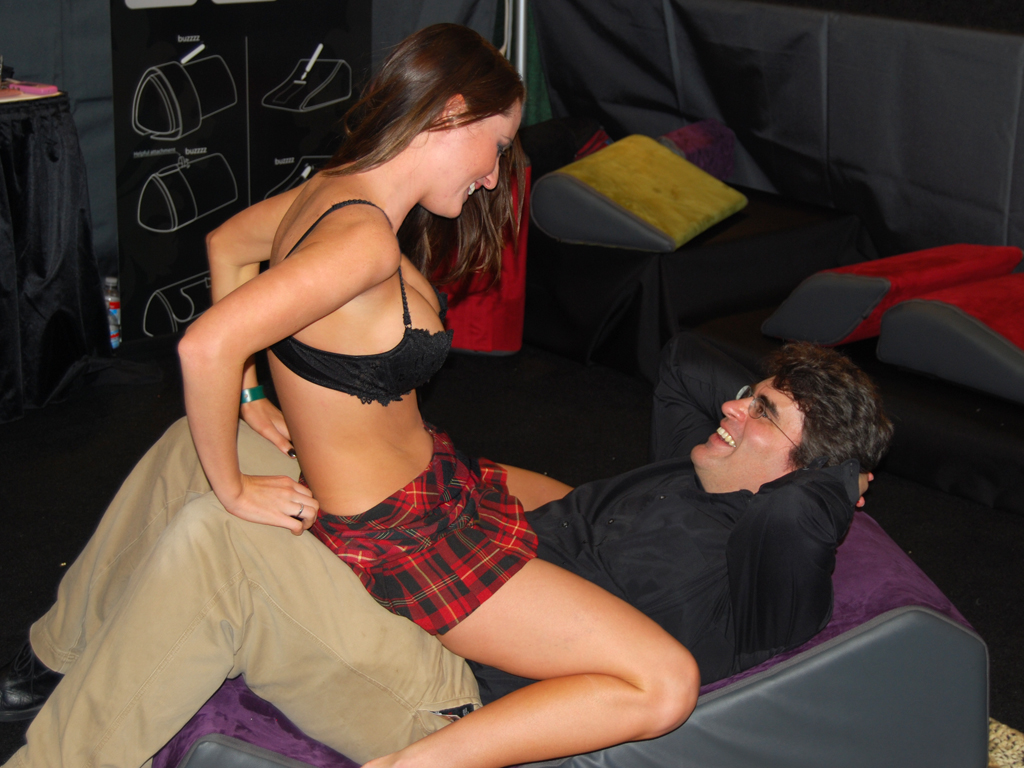
Lap or couch contact dance demonstration at the 2008 AVN Adult Entertainment Expo

A lap dance (or contact dance) is a type of erotic dance performance offered in many strip clubs in which the dancer typically has body contact with a seated patron. Lap dancing is different from table dancing, in which the dancer is close to a seated patron, but without body contact. Variant terms include couch dance, which is a lap dance where the recipient is seated on a couch.

With full-contact lap dances, the dancer may engage in non-penetrative sexual contact with the patron, such as "grinding" or "twerking" their body against the patron. Depending on the local jurisdiction and community standards, the participants in lap dancing are sometimes allowed to touch or be touched by each other. In some clubs any touching by the patron is forbidden. In others there is no oversight by the club and various levels of contact are negotiable between the participants. Clubs vary widely with regard to their enforcement of rules, and some turn a blind eye to any violations.

Lap dancing usually occurs with both participants being either clothed to more or less the same degree, or naked, or the dancer being partially or fully naked, depending on the laws of the jurisdiction and the club's policies. Some jurisdictions require a prohibition on alcohol if various degrees of nudity are allowed. In other jurisdictions nudity is only allowed where skin contact does not occur between the dancer and the patron, requiring at least one of them to wear clothing. Where specific licensing exists for an establishment to allow prostitution, the dress requirements may also be dependent on that licensing. As the dancer is rarely dressed to a greater degree than the patron, lap dancing is sometimes seen as a submissive act by the dancer.

In some places, a "block session" of lap dances (usually half an hour to an hour) can be booked in a "champagne room" or "VIP room", which is a private room usually located in the back of a club. In many clubs, the duration of a lap dance is measured by the length of the song being played by the club's DJ. Charges for lap dances vary significantly.

== Controversy ==
There is some debate as to whether lap dancing is entertainment or a type of sex work. Critics of lap dancing allege that some club owners, by installing dark private booths and charging dancers steep stage fees, are covertly condoning and encouraging the sale of sexual acts between customers and dancers. This can be a concern if, as for instance in the United Kingdom, the club has a public entertainment licence rather than a sex establishment licence, and in jurisdictions where brothels are illegal.

== History and legal issues ==
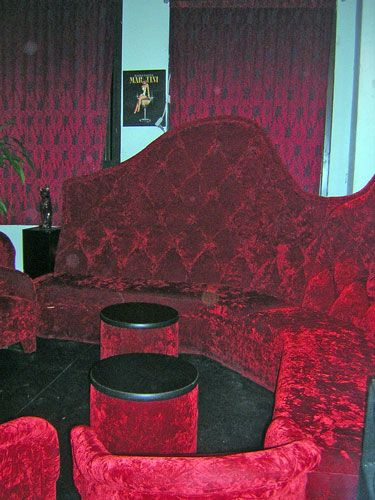
Typical area where lap dances are performed in semi-privacy

Lap dancing clubs, are a later development of earlier strip clubs, where strippers danced on stage and were paid a wage. In the 1970s, New York's Melody Theater introduced audience participation and called it "Mardi Gras". The Melody Theater became the Harmony Theater and operated in two locations in Manhattan for over 20 years until it was closed down in 1998.

Also during the 1970s, adult film makers Jim and Artie Mitchell had been running an adult movie house, called the O'Farrell Theatre, in San Francisco to feature their films. But in the second half of the 1970s, with the invention of the videocassette recorder and a proliferation of video cassette rental stores, the demand for adult movie theaters began to plummet. Realizing that they needed a new business model for their building, the Mitchell brothers sent manager Vince Stanich around the country to explore customer-contact shows in sex clubs. After Stanich reported back, the Mitchell brothers responded in 1977 by opening three new rooms at their O'Farrell Theatre featuring customer-contact shows: The Ultra Room, The Kopenhagen, and New York Live. The Kopenhagen's shows were performed by a pair of naked women in a small room with about twenty men. However the club's most profitable new venue was New York Live, which was a cabaret-style strip club act with women dancing three song sets upon a stage, while usually being totally nude for the final song.

Most of the strippers who were not dancing were sitting naked on customers' laps for tips. The amount of tipping rapidly increased and was then marketed as a "lap dance", and its popularity caused lines of men to regularly appear outside the theater's doors. The Mitchells hired new dancers as fast as they could to keep up with demand, and had created another sex-show innovation which gained them international notoriety and generated more money than their film business.

Later in 2004, a San Francisco District Attorney's decision to drop prostitution charges against lap dancers in the city changed the sexual culture of San Francisco and "has the potential to influence the policies of other cities".

In some areas of the U.S. and Canada, local authorities began cracking down on lap dancing after reports that some clubs allowed customers to engage in sexual intercourse or other sexual activity with dancers during lap dance sessions. Various strip clubs have wide-ranging rules on how customers should interact with strippers.

=== Canada ===
In 1973, an upmarket Vancouver bar called "Gary Taylor's Show Lounge" employed showgirls and strippers as waitresses who gave a free dance with every drink. The club was raided by the police under the guise of obscenity legislation, but, in 1974, Judge Jack McGivern ruled that dancer nudity was not obscene, which started a trend of nude dancing in bars. No contact between dancers and patrons was allowed at the club, but Gary Taylor's had a boxing ring where the girls performed revealing acrobatics after stripping off and then earned tips. Americans from Washington state made the trip to the club from the United States, which at the time had stricter laws.

In a landmark ruling regarding the 1994 case of Pat Mara and Allan East (the owner and manager of Cheaters Tavern), Judge E. Gordon Hachborn legally defined lap dancing and ruled that it did not contravene Canadian public decency statutes. A number of conflicting judgements were issued in the years that followed, including decisions to close certain bars in which sex acts took place on the floor of the club and other rulings in which patrons were allowed to touch the dancers, as long as an actual sex act did not take place.

In 1999, the Supreme Court of Canada ruled that a typical lap dance did not constitute an "obscene" act within the meaning of the Criminal Code. The Crown did not argue that lap dances constituted "prostitution", and therefore the court did not address the possible issue that the typical lap dance may contravene one or more anti-prostitution laws. This led to the displacement of strip clubs and table dancing clubs in Canada by lap dancing clubs.

In 2005, two Supreme Court of Canada rulings (R. v. Labaye and R. v. Kouri) decriminalized private sex clubs in Canada.

On 20 December 2013, (in Bedford v. Canada) the Supreme Court of Canada found the laws prohibiting brothels, public communication for the purpose of prostitution, and living on the profits of prostitution to be unconstitutional. The ruling gave the Canadian parliament twelve months to rewrite Canada's prostitution laws; in the meantime, existing anti-prostitution laws continued to be enforced. Current laws on prostitution in Canada, introduced in 2014, make it illegal to purchase sexual services (including lap dancing) but legal to sell them.

=== Ireland ===
In the early 2000s, lap dancing expanded rapidly in the Republic of Ireland, building on an existing strip pub industry. A number of lap-dancing clubs were opened in Dublin, including one by the English nightclub owner Peter Stringfellow. Lap-dancing clubs were also opened across the country. Many of Ireland's lap-dancing clubs have subsequently closed as a result of the worsened economic climate and changes to Ireland's licensing laws in 2008. Reputational issues have also played a part in the decline of Ireland's lap-dancing clubs.

Police raids took place on Irish lap-dancing clubs in 2003 in search of criminal activity as part of Operation Quest. Efforts to distance Irish lap dancing from the sex industry were hampered by the UK's decision in 2010 to classify its lap dancing clubs as sex establishments. Ireland's lap-dancing clubs became viewed as more expensive than their rivals overseas and more restricted in terms of the entertainment on offer. By 2012 there were five or six clubs operating in Dublin, one in Galway and one in Cork. Most lap-dancing clubs in Ireland operate a no-touching rule, and typically do not charge dancers a "house fee" to perform, instead taking a proportion of the dancer's earnings.

=== United Kingdom ===
The first lap dancing club in the UK was opened in 1995. During the 2000s the lap dancing industry grew quickly, with the Licensing Act 2003 as the only legislation in England and Wales regulating lap dancing clubs. The Lap Dancing Association (LDA), a trade association for the UK lap dancing industry, was formed in 2006 and officially launched in 2008. It operated a code of practice for its members. According to a BBC report, as of November 2008, the association represented roughly one-third of the industry's clubs. Members included For Your Eyes Only, Spearmint Rhino, Bandit Queen and Candy Bar. In 2008, clubs were being opened at a rate of about one per week.

In April 2008 the LDA proposed that its code of conduct should become legally enforceable by local authorities as part of their licensing function. The association submitted a memorandum to the Culture, Media and Sport Committee in November 2008 when the latter was reviewing the Licensing Act 2003. The association said that there was no sexual activity offered for sale in their clubs, and that to classify them as part of the sex industry would stigmatise performers. Simon Warr, who ran the clubs Platinum Lace and For Your Eyes Only and who was the president of the LDA In 2009, gave oral evidence to the committee, describing lap dancing as "not sexually stimulating". Three MPs undertook a fact-finding visit to a London lap dancing club at the invitation of the LDA. The association opposed the provisions of the subsequent Policing and Crime Act 2009 which reclassified lap-dancing clubs in England and Wales as "sexual entertainment venues" instead of "entertainment venues", introduced a licensing system for clubs and allowed local authorities to decide the number and location of lap-dancing clubs in their area. Chris Knight, vice-chairman of the LDA, said that the cost of the additional licence required to run a lap dancing club from 2010 could affect many businesses and questioned the right of local authorities to make licensing decisions on "emotive and moralistic grounds".

In 2009, the total number of clubs had reached its peak of 310 (approximately twice the number in 2003), and the number of lap-dancers was estimated at 10,000. Lap-dancing clubs had opened in big cities, small towns, and out-of-town business parks. The figures plateaued during the subsequent weaker economic climate and had hardly changed by 2012. At that point, the amount of money a lap-dancer earned in an average shift was £230 (down from around £280 in 2011), and the industry was valued at around £300 million. However, some clubs, particularly in London, charged a house fee for the dancers to perform and had an increased number of dancers, which reduced an individual dancer's earnings.

Between 2010 and 2015, there were approximately forty-five refusals of licences for sexual entertainment venues in England and Wales, mainly on the grounds that the locality was unsuitable. The legislation provides for no right of appeal against such refusals, except on the grounds that committees have not followed correct procedure. The number of refusals, together with the costs of licence application, means that there have been few new businesses opened since 2010, with the overall number of clubs declining over time as a number of local authorities implemented a "nil limit" for new clubs.

In February 2014, Fiona Mactaggart (MP for Slough) asked the Secretary of State for Work and Pensions, Iain Duncan Smith, if he would "make it his policy not to offer job subsidies for employing teenagers as auxiliary workers in adult entertainment establishments". Her question related to employers in the adult entertainment industry being offered an incentive of over £2,000 from the Department for Work and Pensions for every unemployed young person (aged 18–24) that they hired. Esther McVey, the Minister of State for Employment, stated that: "The Welfare Reform Act 2012 ensured that vacancies which involve performing sexual activities were banned from being advertised on Government websites and a distinction was made in law to differentiate between performers and ancillary workers."

==== Scotland ====
In 2005 Tom McCabe MSP set up the Adult Entertainment Working Group, an advisory body within the Scottish Government, to investigate the legislative issues involved in a proposed lap dancing ban in Scotland. At that time, lap dancing clubs in Scotland were licensed under Section 41 of the Civic Government (Scotland) Act 1982, which covers general entertainment licenses, and licences in Scotland could not be refused on the basis of the nature of the entertainment in itself. The working group, headed by Linda Costelloe Baker, consisted of academics, lawyers and politicians, and had a working period from April 2005 until April 2006. It commissioned the market research organisation Ipsos MORI to examine the public's attitudes towards adult entertainment, completed site visits and took evidence from a variety of witnesses. Respondents to the group's consultation included the Church of Scotland. The group reported to Scottish ministers on 25 April 2006.

The group concluded that lap dancing venues are a form of "commercial sexual exploitation...which encompasses pornography, internet sex chat rooms, sex phone lines, escort services, prostitution, trafficking for prostitution, peep shows, lap dancing, pole dancing, table dancing and stripping". It recommended reviewing the licensing of lap dancing venues and proposed national guidelines to prevent performers from touching or being touched by customers, ensuring that activities are visible at all times, and introducing a minimum age of 18 for everyone involved. A prominent voice of opposition to a lap dancing ban was exotic dancer Veronica Deneuve who set out to try to involve the stripping community in the discussion to inform such legislation. The International Union of Sex Workers said that the "recommendations are flawed and would be extremely detrimental to workers and operators in the industry".

The Scottish Government accepted a number of the recommendations, but it rejected the idea that licensing boards should be able to determine whether full nudity is appropriate in given locales. It also rejected the idea of a compulsory one-metre no-touching zone between dancer and customer, suggesting that this would be unenforceable. It did, however, propose to enable licensing boards to consider nude dance venues as a separate class of venue. No legislation directly followed the group's report. However, the report informed the statement of licensing policy of many licensing boards across Scotland on the introduction of the Licensing (Scotland) Act 2005.

In 2013 the Scottish Government and carried out a consultation on the regulation of "sexual entertainment venues". This, in combination with the AEWG's 2006 report, paved the way for the Scottish Parliament to introduce licensing reform for lap dancing as part of the Air Weapons and Licensing (Scotland) Act 2015. This came into effect in 2016 and requires local authorities in Scotland to set out individual policies with regard to the licensing of lap dancing clubs.

==== Northern Ireland ====
Northern Ireland's first lap dancing club was opened by Donegal businessman Jerome Brennan, who already owned lap dancing clubs in Dundalk and Limerick in the Republic of Ireland, mainly using dancers from Russia and the Baltic states. In 2002 Brennan opened the Movie Star Cafe, a lap dancing club in Belfast, with dancers from Belfast and England. The Belfast club was officially opened as a restaurant to circumvent Northern Ireland's licensing laws. The opening of the club was opposed by Rev. David McIlveen, a minister in the Free Presbyterian Church of Ulster, and the club was often picketed by protesters from the church and women's groups. In 2003 councillors from Belfast City Council expressed their intention to refuse the renewal of the club's licence, and the club closed in November 2003 with debts of over £300,000. Brennan's nightclub in Dundalk remained open.

A few years later Northern Ireland businessman Lawrence John organised lap dancing at a Hooters bar, followed by a clandestine lap dancing club in Belfast in 2007. It was the subject of a report on the BBC Northern Ireland TV programme Spotlight in 2008 alleging that simulated lesbian sex shows took place on the premises.

=== United States ===
Some jurisdictions in the United States outlaw lap dances and enforce a minimum distance between dancer and patron. In Seattle, one such minimum distance ordinance was overturned by public referendum in November 2006.

Also in 2006, concerned about reports of sexual assault and illegal stage fees, San Francisco's Commission on the Status of Women recommended a ban on private rooms and booths at adult clubs in the city. However, a majority of dancers at the Commission's meetings and the San Francisco Board of Supervisors' meetings protested against these efforts, fearing for their income and claiming that these rooms were safer than other venues. As a result, the Commission's proposed ban was not adopted by the city.

In February 2010, the Detroit City Council voted to ban lap dances in VIP rooms. However, across from Detroit in Windsor, Ontario in Canada, lap dancing remained legal, even where alcohol was served, and sex clubs were also legal in Windsor.

In 2012, the New York Court of Appeals ruled that lap dances were not an art form and are subject to sales tax.

== Labor issues and job conditions ==
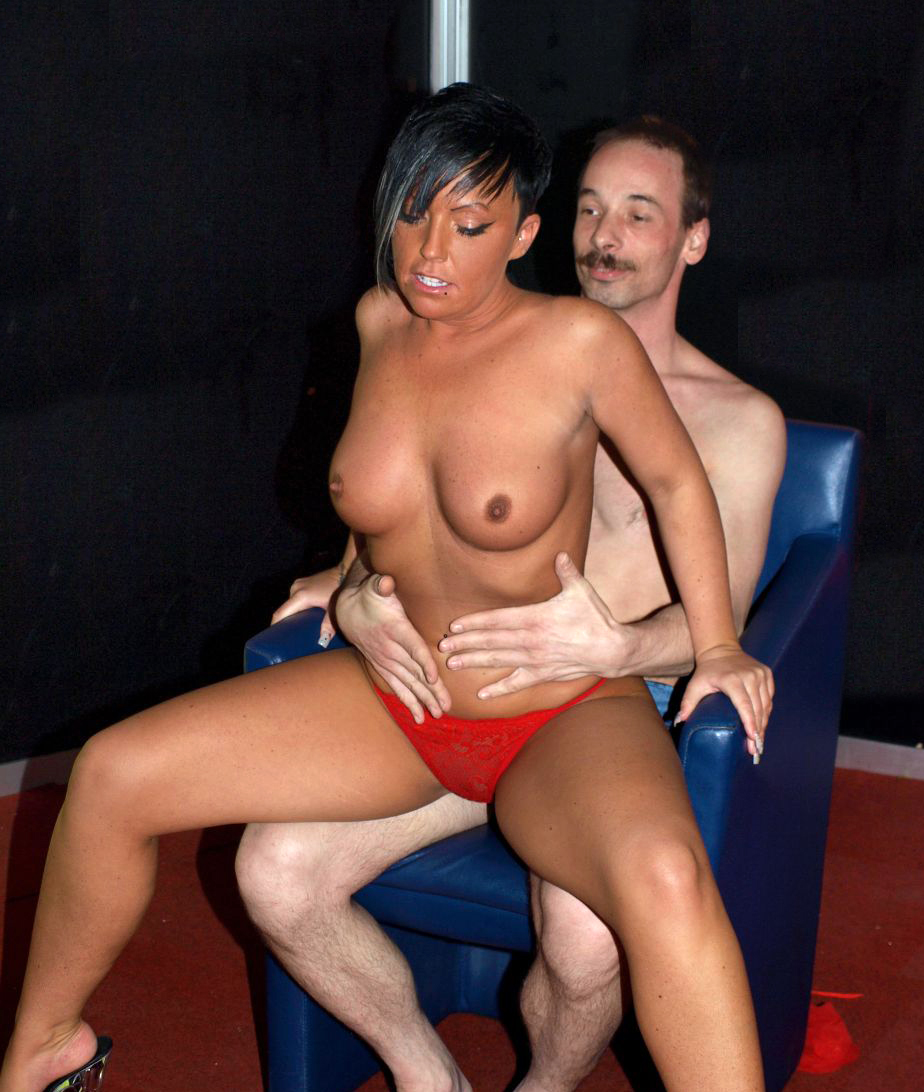
An erotic dancer doing a contact topless lap dance

The economic position of lap dancers, as employees of the clubs, has also changed. Over time, most strip clubs have stopped paying wages to the dancers. Stage dancing became a showcase to advertise the bodies of the dancers, whose money came from the tips or standard charges, depending on the club, that the patrons gave them for lap dancing. In the majority of clubs, dancers are simply charged a percentage of their nightly takings. However, the latest development in many countries, including Great Britain, the United States and Canada, is that many clubs charge dancers a "stage fee" or "tip-out", which is an amount that a dancer needs to pay a club (usually in advance) in order to work on a given night, per shift. The lapdancers are expected to tip the "house mothers" (women who work in a strip club to support and assist the dancers) and DJs.

Given that dancers are basically paying for the privilege to be at a club, some clubs allow as many dancers as possible to appear on any given night, increasing competition among the dancers. Also, the vast majority of clubs will not waive this charge if a night happens to be slow. Consequently, the dancer either leaves her shift without any profit or builds a debt to the club.

Concerns raised by lapdancers include patrons stalking them, exposing their penis, ejaculating in their pants, attempting to rape them, or committing other forms of sexual assault. Some lapdance clubs have CCTV cameras in the "champagne rooms" for the safety of the dancers. Dancer Mary Jane says that when a lapdancer wishes to have paid sexual activities with a client, she tips the management, waitresses, and DJ to "turn a blind eye" to these sexual activities.

In the U.S., most clubs treat dancers as independent contractors, thereby avoiding the need to pay minimum wages, overtime pay, income taxes and other benefits required by law. This status has repeatedly been challenged by some dancers. While labor commissions and the courts have, for the most part, ruled that exotic dancers are employees and deserving of reimbursement for back pay and stage fees, some court decisions have decided that an exotic dancer can be classified as an independent contractor. In June 2006, in Tracy Buel v. Chowder House (dba The Hungry I) an appellate court of California's first district ruled that dancer Tracy Buel, also known as "Daisy Anarchy", was correctly classified as an independent contractor and that "Buel shall pay defendants' costs on appeal". A publication called the California Employment Law Letter described the case as follows: "The dancer based her suit on the fact that she was an employee of the nightclub rather than an independent contractor. The appellate court, however, after applying a 10-factor test, upheld the jury's verdict in favor of the nightclub and its owners and found that the evidence weighed in favor of classifying the dancer as an independent contractor rather than an employee."

In an article written for The Guardian, which was partly based on an interview with an anonymous former stripper, journalist Rachel Bell claimed that "[r]esearch shows that the majority of women become lap-dancers through poverty and lack of choice," and that "academic research has linked lap-dancing to trafficking, prostitution and an increase in male sexual violence against both the women who work in the clubs and those who live and work in their vicinity." For example, a "recent conference in Ireland highlighted the use of lap-dance clubs by human traffickers as a tool for grooming women into prostitution; the clubs also normalise the idea of paying for sexual services." "[R]esearch on strip clubs in the US found that all dancers had suffered verbal harassment and physical and sexual abuse while at work; all had been propositioned for prostitution; and three-quarters had been stalked by men associated with the club."

However, these claims have been disputed by some studies. A paper published in 2020 which examined the relationship between strip clubs and rates of sexual violence and violent crime in the United States concluded that "strip clubs were significantly associated with violent crime, but not with" sexual violence.

Another analysis, conducted by the University of Leeds, "which involved interviews with 300 dancers, found there was a high level of job satisfaction and all had some qualifications", while another concluded that "that there are other motivations to stripping beside just economic", and that "[n]on-monetary motivations were significantly important ... and were discussed more than monetary motivations" by those who were examined. The overwhelming majority of those surveyed were satisfied with their work, because they got to choose their own hours, got paid instantly, got more money than in other available jobs, and had the opportunity to combine "fun and work" (e.g., socializing with other dancers and patrons). They also stated that "groups hostile toward stripping disregard their right to free speech and occupational choice, dismiss their ability to think for themselves, and are patronizing and condescending". At the same time, the same study revealed various disadvantages to lap dancing work, such as uncertainty regarding earnings, having to keep their job secret from friends and family, and occasionally having to face rude and abusive customers. Additionally, while most felt safe, almost half of the dancers interviewed had faced frequent verbal harassment and unwanted touching from patrons. Another issue raised by the dancers was their lack of labour rights in the workplace and high overhead costs – house fees (or stage fees), commissions, fines (whether paid directly to the club's management or not), and tipping out (or paying a portion of their income) to DJs and bouncers.

Critics of lap dancing choose to describe it as a type of sex work, because, in their opinion, "it is difficult to discern between the performance of erotic dance and prostitution." However, others contend that it is a misnomer to call a lap dancer a sex worker, because no sexual act is technically performed during a typical lap dance. Club owners in the UK argue that lap dancing should not be labelled as sex work. On the other hand, one lapdancer, Mary Jane, told a reporter that she and other lapdancers negotiate "extras" (nicknamed the "secret menu") with clients, such as a "hand job" (male masturbation) or sexual intercourse, for additional payment.

In 2007, based on statistics from eighteen dancers over a period of 60 days, it was noted that female lap dancers earned the highest tips around the time of ovulation, during the most fertile period of their menstrual cycle and the lowest tips during menstruation; the average difference in earning between those two times amounted to about $30 per hour. Women on the pill earned overall less than those not on the pill. The results were interpreted as evidence of estrus in humans: females apparently advertise their fertility status to males in some manner. This finding earned its authors the 2008 Ig Nobel Prize (a parody of the Nobel Prize given for unusual or trivial achievements in scientific research) in Economics.

=== Level of contact ===
Establishments that offer lap dancing, and the lap dancers themselves, are sometimes rated regarding "mileage." It refers to the amount of contact between dancer and patron during the performance. Every jurisdiction has its own laws regarding such contact, but enforcement of these laws is sporadic. Ultimately, it comes down to what the club and the dancer will allow.

Nevada, and especially Las Vegas, have established very lenient laws regarding what contact is allowed during a lap dance. Patrons may legally touch the dancer anywhere she will permit, excluding the genitals. This has led to a pricing strategy in some all-nude strip clubs, in which a standard lap dance is considered to be just topless with no contact, but can be upgraded to include full nudity or touching with additional payment.

== In film ==
- 1995: In the film Showgirls, Zack Carey (Kyle MacLachlan) gets a lap dance from Nomi Malone (Elizabeth Berkley).
- 1999: In the film Go, Marcus (Taye Diggs) and a friend get lap dances in Las Vegas, but violence ensues when a bouncer assaults them after some hand-contact with a lap dancer.
- 2001: In director Wayne Wang's film The Center of the World starring Peter Sarsgaard and Molly Parker, a wealthy dot-com entrepreneur becomes obsessed with a lap dancer.
- 2007: In Quentin Tarantino's film Death Proof, Butterfly performs a lap dance on Stuntman Mike to The Coasters' "Down in Mexico". In the double-feature Grindhouse, the scene was abruptly "skipped" in a comical manner.
- 2010: In the film Welcome to the Rileys starring James Gandolfini and Kristen Stewart, an emotionally damaged man tries to help a wayward lap dancer.
- 2014: Within the film Lap Dance starring Carmen Electra, an actress makes a pact with her fiancé to take a job as a lap dancer in order to take care of her cancer-stricken father.

== See also ==
- Erotic dance
- Legal status of striptease
- Pole dance
- Strip club
- Striptease
- Taxi dancer
- Las Vegas Dancers Alliance
