= Sex establishment licence =

Licence to operate a sex establishment in the UK

In the United Kingdom, a sex establishment licence is a form of licence required for carrying on some types of sex-related businesses. Sex establishment licences are granted by local authorities, under the powers granted by the Local Government (Miscellaneous Provisions) Act 1982.

There are three classes of sex establishments: sex shops, sex cinemas, and sexual entertainment venues.

== Sexual entertainment venues ==
Sexual entertainment venues (SEVs) are defined in the Policing and Crime Act 2009, and are regulated by local authorities under the Local Government (Miscellaneous Provisions) Act 1982. This classification was originally intended to regulate lap-dancing clubs, but also extends to venues where other kinds of sex-related entertainment takes place, including live sex shows and peep shows. Swingers' clubs and other venues where naked people or people having sex may be visible to other attendees are not commonly regulated as SEVs. This is due to the nature of the act that is intended for lap-dancing clubs. As Swingers clubs do not pay attendees to provide the entertainment, many clubs have argued that they do not provide the entertainment for an audience and are therefore exempt.

Local authorities have the power to cap the number of SEVs in their area and can set the cap at zero (a nil cap). United Sex Workers (now the Sex Workers Union) successfully challenged nil caps in Edinburgh and Bristol.

== See also ==
- Strip club § United Kingdom
