= Bob Bradley (wrestler) =

American professional wrestler (born 1958)

Personal information
- Born: Robert Markovich; October 18, 1950 (age 75) Lanham, Maryland, U.S.

Professional wrestling career
- Ring name(s): Bob Bradley; Battle Kat "Cowboy" Bob Bradley; The Tiger; The Red Demon; The Cat Man
- Billed weight: 238 lb (108 kg)
- Trained by: Jimmy Snuka
- Debut: 1982
- Retired: 1992

Robert Markovich (born October 18, 1950) is an American retired professional wrestler, better known by the ring names Bob Bradley and Battle Kat. He wrestled for the World Wrestling Federation, World Class Championship Wrestling, the Universal Wrestling Federation, World Championship Wrestling, All Japan Pro Wrestling, and the National Wrestling Conference.

== Professional wrestling career ==
=== World Wrestling Federation (1982–1988) ===
After being trained by "Superfly" Jimmy Snuka, Markovich began his career in 1982, appearing at a World Wrestling Federation taping on June 1, 1982, in Allentown, Pennsylvania. There he wrestled and was defeated by noted wrestler and trainer Larry Sharpe. Wrestling as "Bob Bradley", he would continue to make appearances at tapings for the WWF syndicated shows Championship Wrestling and All-American Wrestling, facing opponents such as Jimmy Snuka, Blackjack Mulligan, and Buddy Rose. A little more than a month after his first match, Bradley gained his first victory when he pinned Laurent Soucie at a house show in Salisbury, Maryland. Despite his inexperience, he became a full-time member of the roster. As an enhancement talent, he sustained numerous losses in 1983 and 1984, falling to much of the WWF roster. He also gained occasional wins, defeating similar undercard talent like Barry Hart (Barry Horowitz), Mac Rivera, and Jose Estrada. Following January 1984 his appearances became infrequent, and he wrestled only a small number of WWF matches that year and in 1985. During 1985 he also appeared for the NWC promotion in Massachusetts, wrestling as "Cowboy" Bob Bradley. In 1986 Bradley donned a mask and was known as "The Tiger" during a WWF tour of Australia. He also donned a mask that year and wrestled occasionally as The Red Demon. On September 16, 1986, he was the opponent for "Superstar" Billy Graham in the latter's return to the WWF. Following a loss to Jerry Allen on October 26, 1986, he wrestled exclusively as The Red Demon. His final match in his first WWF run came January 26, 1988 when he teamed with Van Van Horne against The British Bulldogs.

=== World Class Championship Wrestling (1986–1987) ===
While still wrestling under a mask in the WWF, Markovich joined World Class Championship Wrestling in Texas, making his first appearance on a Christmas Day card where he wrestled The Dingo Warrior (Ultimate Warrior) to a double disqualification. The following month he achieved his greatest success in the promotion, when he defeated Roberto Soto, Steve Simpson, Matt Borne, and finally The Dingo Warrior to win a tournament to determine the vacated Texas Heavyweight Champion. Three weeks later he would lose the title to The Dingo Warrior in a match in Fort Worth, Texas. Following the defeat Bradley entered a losing streak that carried through to his departure from the promotion in March.

=== Universal Wrestling Federation (1987) ===
A month later Bradley joined Bill Watts's Universal Wrestling Federation (UWF), losing to Steve Williams in on April 19 in Fort Worth. He wrestled a total of twelve times for the UWF, facing The Super Ninja, Mike Boyette, Dick Murdoch, and others and winning several matches. Following a match with Sting on the August 15th, 1987 edition of Power Pro Wrestling he left the promotion.

=== World Championship Wrestling (1989) ===
Bob Bradley entered World Championship Wrestling (WCW) on February 4, 1989, losing to Abdullah the Butcher at a house show in Philadelphia. On February 15 he made his first televised appearance, losing to Ricky Steamboat at Clash of the Champions V. Bradley was winless in competition against Eddie Gilbert, Rick Steiner, and Michael Hayes. He left the promotion at the end of March.

=== World Wrestling Federation (1989–1992, 1998) ===
On August 29, 1989, Markovich returned to the WWF and was defeated by Jimmy Snuka at a Wrestling Challenge taping in Springfield, MA. After sporadic appearances, he began another full-time run with the promotion in December. On January 2, 1990, just less than three years after defeating him to win the Texas Heavyweight Championship in WCCW, Bradley was squashed by Intercontinental Champion The Ultimate Warrior at a WWF Superstars of Wrestling taping in Birmingham, Alabama. He finally picked up his first victory since 1987 when he pinned Jim Powers in Wheeling, WV, but remained mired in the undercard.

Fellow enhancement talent Brady Boone returned to the WWF in 1990 and was given the first real push of his career when he was given the character of Battle Kat. Dressed in a furry black mask, the character was accentuated by Boone's gymnastics. Wrestling as Battle Kat, his first televised opponent was against Bob Bradley in a match that aired on Wrestling Challenge on October 14, 1990. However, after the match Boone left the promotion, and the WWF decided to instead give the gimmick to the also acrobatic Bob Bradley. Two weeks later on Wrestling Spotlight he would make his debut as the Kat, teaming with Koko B. Ware against The Orient Express. Under the mask Markovich would see the greatest push of his WWF tenure, facing and defeating Buddy Rose, Pez Whatley, Paul Diamond, and Boris Zukhov. His run at Battle Kat finally ended when he was defeated by The Barbarian on the December 10 edition of Prime Time Wrestling, and shortly thereafter the promotion eliminated the gimmick.

Bradley returned to his previous role as an enhancement talent in 1991, losing to Kerry Von Erich, Koko B Ware, Jim Duggan, "Conan" Chris Walker, and others. On September 10, 1991, he became involved in a minor angle on Wrestling Challenge. In a match with Big Bully Busick the two went to a no-contest after Busick attacked him before the bell. Sid Justice then came out to defeat Busick. Markovich's final match came on November 20, 1992, in Auburn Hills, MI when he teamed with Barry Horowitz against High Energy, after which he retired from the sport

=== Family ===
His son Bob Bradley Jr. would make his debut in 1991 and begin competing full time in 1993. Wrestling as Bobby Bradley, he would work in the independent circuit and wrestled on National Wrestling Conference's debut show on October 8, 1994, losing to Sabu. He had a stint with Smoky Mountain Wrestling in 1995, form a tag-team with Rob Van Dam called Aerial Assualt, a tour for All Japan Pro Wrestling in 1996, and appearing on WWF Shotgun Saturday Night in a match against Steve Blackman in 1998. Bradley Jr. would finish his career with Empire Wrestling Federation in California, retiring in 2002.

== Championships and accomplishments ==
- Pro Wrestling Illustrated
  - PWI ranked him # 302 of the 500 best singles wrestlers in the PWI 500 in 1991.
  - PWI ranked him # 335 of the 500 best singles wrestlers in the PWI 500 in 1992.
- World Class Wrestling Association
  - WCWA Texas Heavyweight Championship (1 time)
