= Samantha Majic =

Political science professor

- Occupations: Political scientist & Professor
- Employer(s): John Jay College & CUNY Graduate Center

Academic background
- Education: Cornell University & York University
- Thesis: Protest by other means? Sex workers, social movement evolution and the political possibilities of nonprofit service provision (2010)

Samantha Ann Majic is a political scientist and professor of political science and criminal justice at John Jay College in New York City, and a faculty member at the CUNY Graduate Center. She is known for her work in gender and American politics.

== Education ==
Majic received her B.A. from University of Toronto in 2001. She has two master's degrees, one from Cornell University (2006) and a second from York University in Toronto, Canada (2003). She received her Ph.D from Cornell University in 2009 from the university's department of government.

== Work ==
Majic is known for her work on themes of women and gender justice, sex work, human trafficking, and social movements. She examined the impact of the St. James Infirmary in San Francisco, California to investigate gender ideologies in the United States. She also works on the role of non-profit organisations in political activity and social change.

== Selected publications ==
- Majic, Samantha (2013-12-19). Sex Work Politics: From Protest to Service Provision. Philadelphia, Pa: University of Pennsylvania Press. ISBN 978-0-8122-0902-0.
- Showden, Carisa Renae; Majic, Samantha, eds. (2014). Negotiating Sex Work: Unintended Consequences of Policy and Activism. University of Minnesota Press. ISBN 978-1-4529-4933-8.
- Showden, Carisa R.; Majic, Samantha (2018-06-29). Youth Who Trade Sex in the U.S. Philadelphia: Temple University Press. ISBN 978-1-4399-1620-9.
- Majic, Samantha (2023-05-16). Lights, Camera, Feminism?. Oakland, California: Univ of California Press. ISBN 978-0-520-38490-3.
