= Spearmint Rhino =

Multinational chain of strip clubs

Spearmint Rhino Companies Worldwide, Inc.
- Type: Private company
- Industry: Gentleman's clubs
- Founded: 1989; 37 years ago in Upland, California, US
- Founder: John L. Gray
- Headquarters: Norco, California
- Number of locations: 31
- Area served: United States, United Kingdom, Australia
- Website: spearmintrhino.com

Spearmint Rhino is a chain of strip clubs that operates venues throughout the United States, United Kingdom, and Australia. The first Spearmint Rhino was located in Upland, California.

== Operations ==
John Gray is the founder & CEO of Spearmint Rhino Consulting Worldwide. His company owns the trademark of Spearmint Rhino Gentlemen's Clubs, Dames N' Games Topless Sports Bars, California Girls Gentlemen's Clubs, Blue Zebra Adult Cabaret and Dirty's Topless Bar. In 2010, the Spearmint Rhino opened 1616 Club, its first non-adult nightclub, in downtown Los Angeles.

Each club location is independently owned, operated and licensed. The company's worldwide headquarters is in Norco, California, US. The London club, in Great Windmill Street, is the flagship club in the UK.

== See also ==
- List of strip clubs
- Las Vegas Dancers Alliance
