= Star and Garter (musical) =

Star and Garter is a 1942 American musical revue starring comedian Bobby Clark and produced by Mike Todd. The show, which opened at Broadway's Music Box Theatre on 24 June 1942, was a smash hit, closing on 4 December 1943 after 609 performances.

Numerous performers were included in the show including burlesque striptease artists Gypsy Rose Lee, Georgia Sothern and Carrie Finnell. Irene Sharaff designed costumes for the show, including bras for Finnell..

Reviewer John Anderson called the show "the season's most anatomical spectacle". Sothern's performance was captured in the short Film Theatarettes film.
