= Music Box Theatre =

Broadway theater in Manhattan, New York

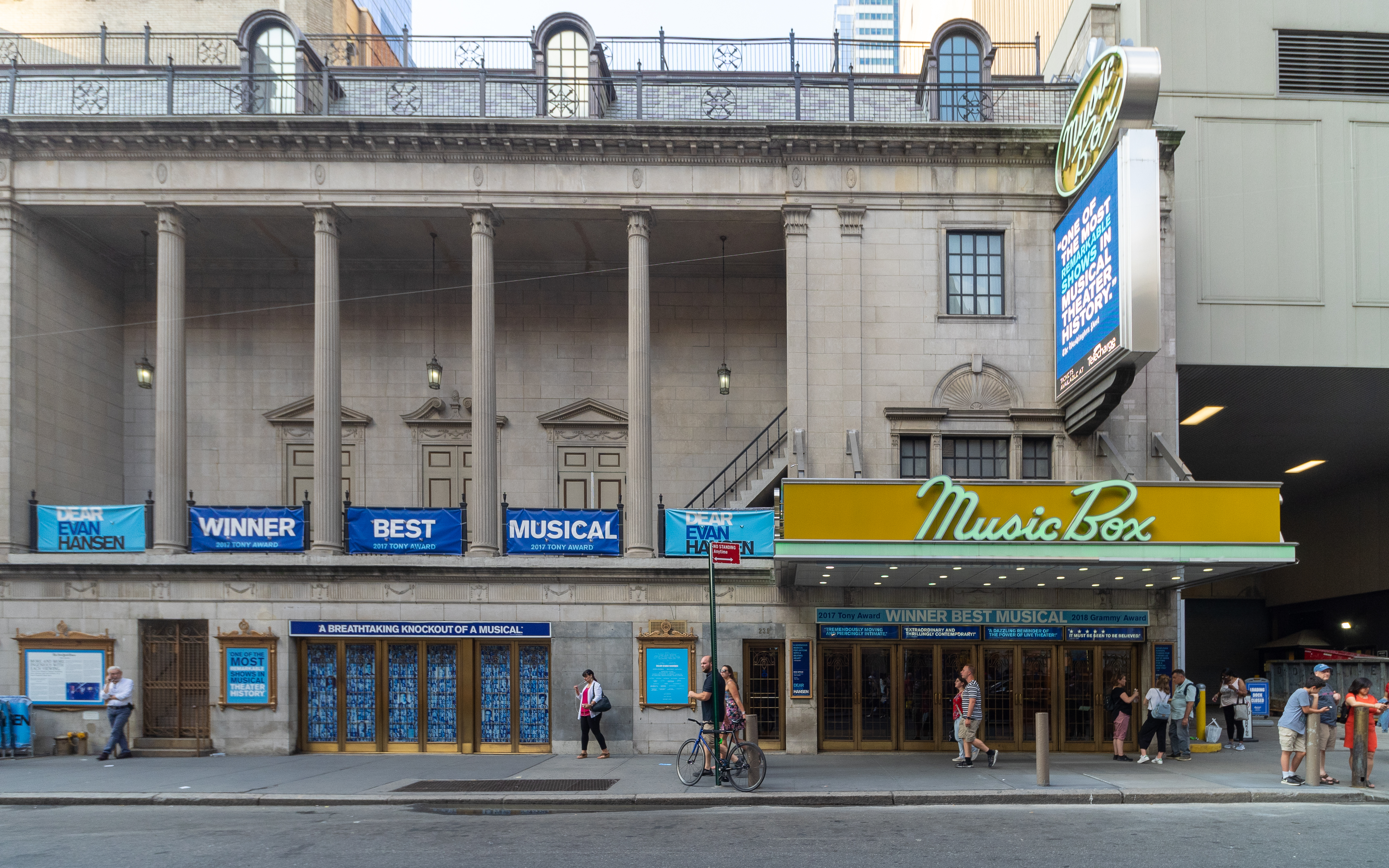
- Showing the musical Dear Evan Hansen in 2019
- Interactive map of Music Box Theatre
- Address: 239 West 45th Street; Manhattan, New York; United States
- Coordinates: 40°45′32″N 73°59′14″W
- Owner: Shubert Organization
- Capacity: 1,025
- Type: Broadway

Construction
- Opened: September 22, 1921; 105 years ago
- Years active: 1921–present
- Architect: C. Howard Crane

Website
- Official website

New York City Landmark
- Designated: December 8, 1987
- Reference no.: 1359
- Designated entity: Facade

New York City Landmark
- Designated: December 8, 1987
- Reference no.: 1360
- Designated entity: Auditorium interior

The Music Box Theatre is a Broadway theater at 239 West 45th Street (George Abbott Way) in the Theater District of Midtown Manhattan in New York City, New York, U.S. Opened in 1921, the Music Box Theatre was designed by C. Howard Crane in a Palladian-inspired style and was constructed for Irving Berlin and Sam H. Harris. It has 1,025 seats across two levels and is operated by The Shubert Organization. Both the facade and the auditorium interior are New York City landmarks.

The facade is made of limestone and is symmetrically arranged, with both Palladian and neo-Georgian motifs. At ground level, the eastern portion of the facade contains the theater's entrance, with a marquee over it, while the stage door is to the west. A double-height central colonnade at the second and third floors conceals a fire-escape staircase; it is flanked by windows in the outer bays. The auditorium contains Adam style detailing, a large balcony, and two outwardly curved box seats within ornate archways. The theater was also designed with a comparatively small lobby, a lounge in the basement, and mezzanine-level offices.

Harris proposed the Music Box Theatre in 1919 specifically to host his productions with Berlin, and the Shubert family gained an ownership stake shortly after the Music Box opened. The theater initially hosted the partners' Music Box Revue nearly exclusively, presenting its first play, Cradle Snatchers, in 1925. Many of the Music Box's early productions were hits with several hundred performances. There were multiple productions by Moss Hart and George S. Kaufman in the 1930s, including Once in a Lifetime and The Man Who Came to Dinner. After Harris died in 1941, Berlin and the Shuberts shared ownership of the theater, and the Music Box largely showed dramas rather than musicals. The theater hosted several plays by William Inge in the 1950s. Though the length of production runs declined in later years, the Music Box has remained in theatrical use since its opening. The Shuberts acquired the Berlin estate's ownership stake in 2007.

== Site ==
The Music Box Theatre is at 239 West 45th Street, on the north sidewalk between Eighth Avenue and Broadway, near Times Square in the Theater District of Midtown Manhattan in New York City, New York, U.S. The square land lot covers 10,050 square feet (934 m^{2}). The theater has a frontage of 100 feet (30 m) on 45th Street and a depth of about 100 feet.

The adjoining block of 45th Street is also known as George Abbott Way, and foot traffic on the street increases box-office totals on the theaters there. The Music Box shares the block with the Richard Rodgers Theatre and Imperial Theatre to the north, as well as the New York Marriott Marquis to the east. Other nearby buildings include the Paramount Hotel to the north; the Hotel Edison and Lunt-Fontanne Theatre to the northeast; One Astor Plaza to the southeast; the Gerald Schoenfeld, Booth, Shubert, and Broadhurst Theatres to the south; and the Majestic, Bernard B. Jacobs, and John Golden Theatres to the southwest.

== Design ==
The Music Box Theatre was designed by C. Howard Crane in a Palladian-inspired style and was constructed from 1920 to 1921 for Irving Berlin and Sam H. Harris. The interior was decorated by Crane and William Baumgarten, with many Adam style details. The Longacre Engineering and Construction Company built the theater, with M. X. C. Weinberger as consulting engineer. Numerous other contractors were involved in the theater's development. The Music Box is operated by the Shubert Organization.

=== Facade ===
Ground floor (west to east)

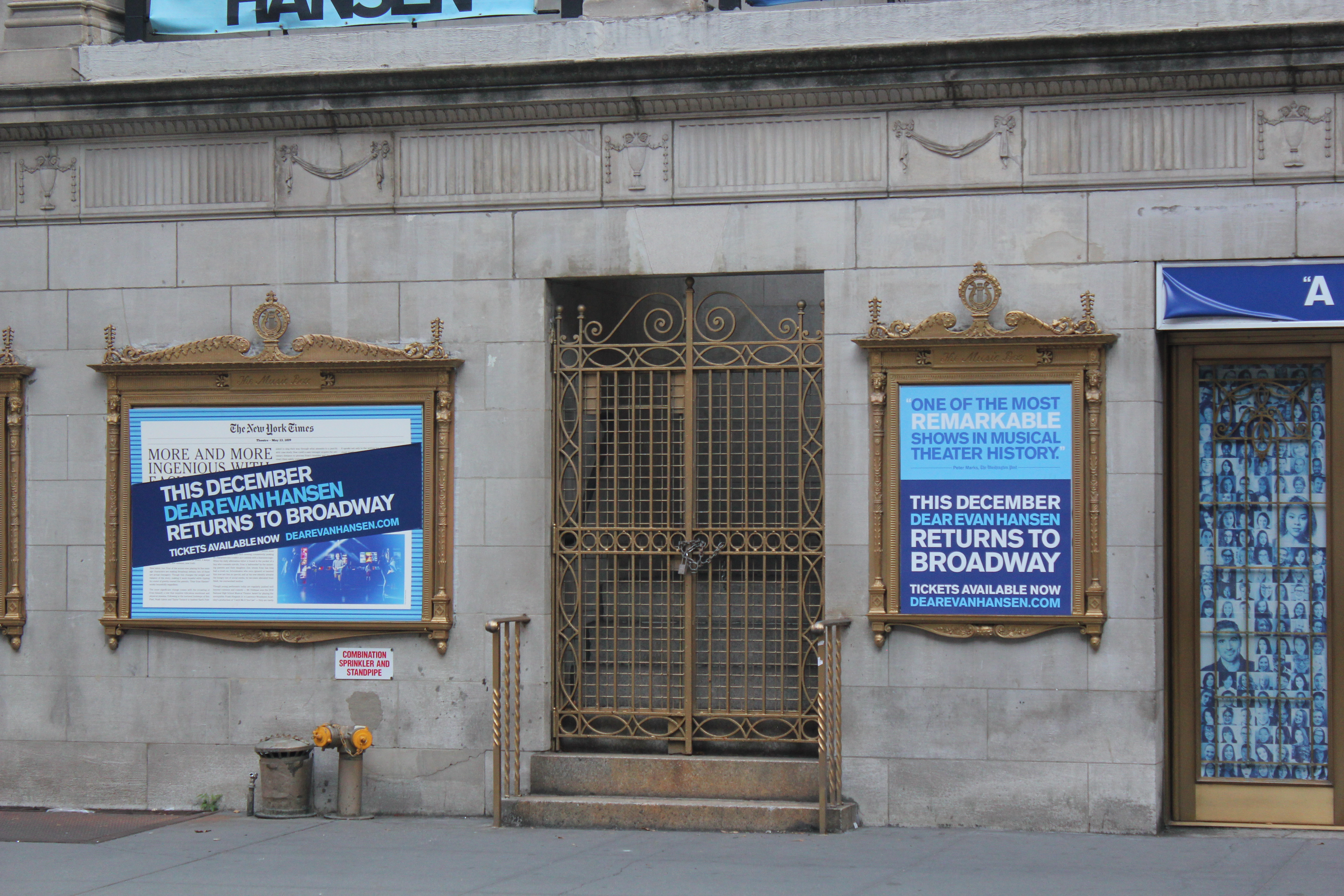
Fire escape (bronze gate)

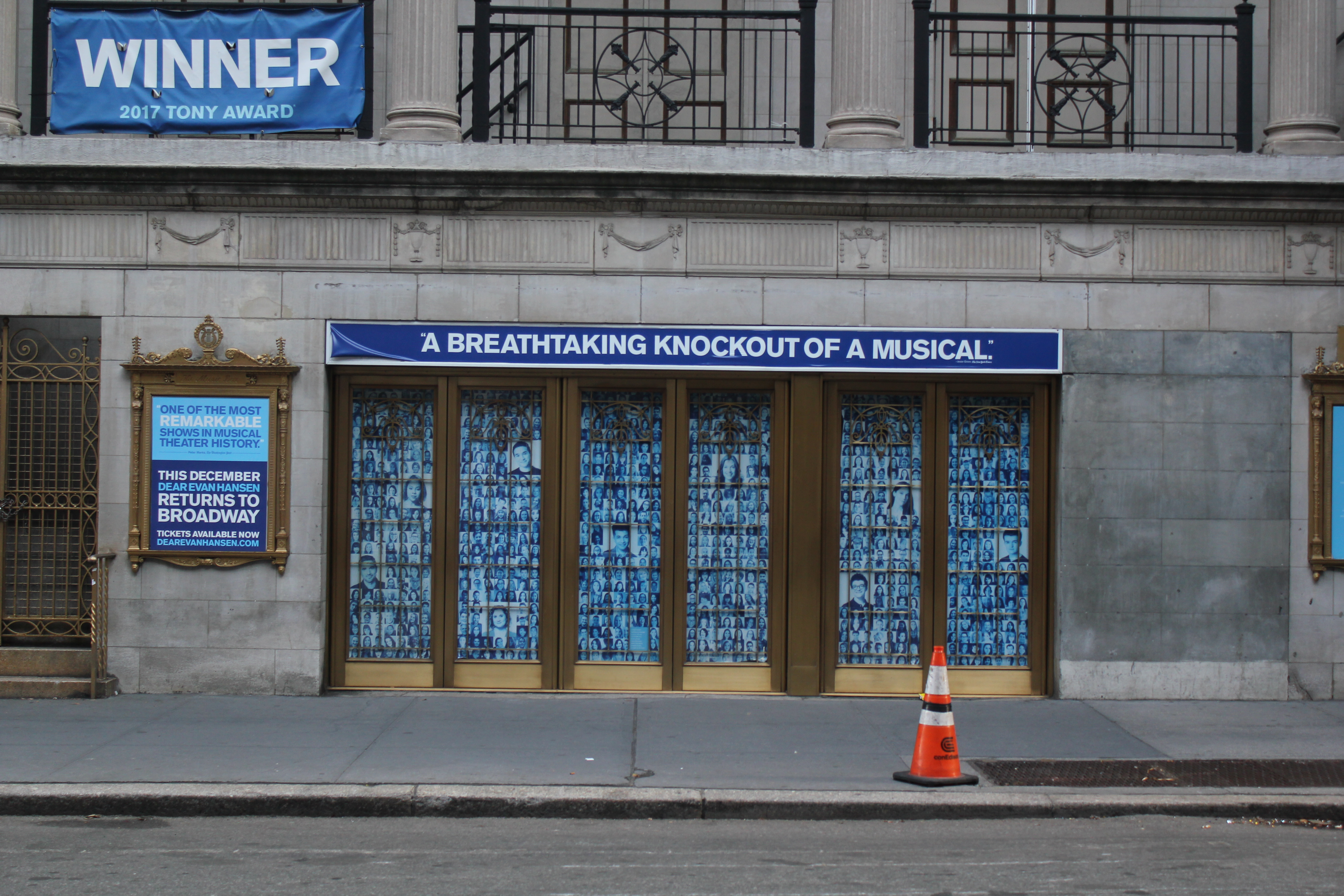
Auditorium exits (three double doors)

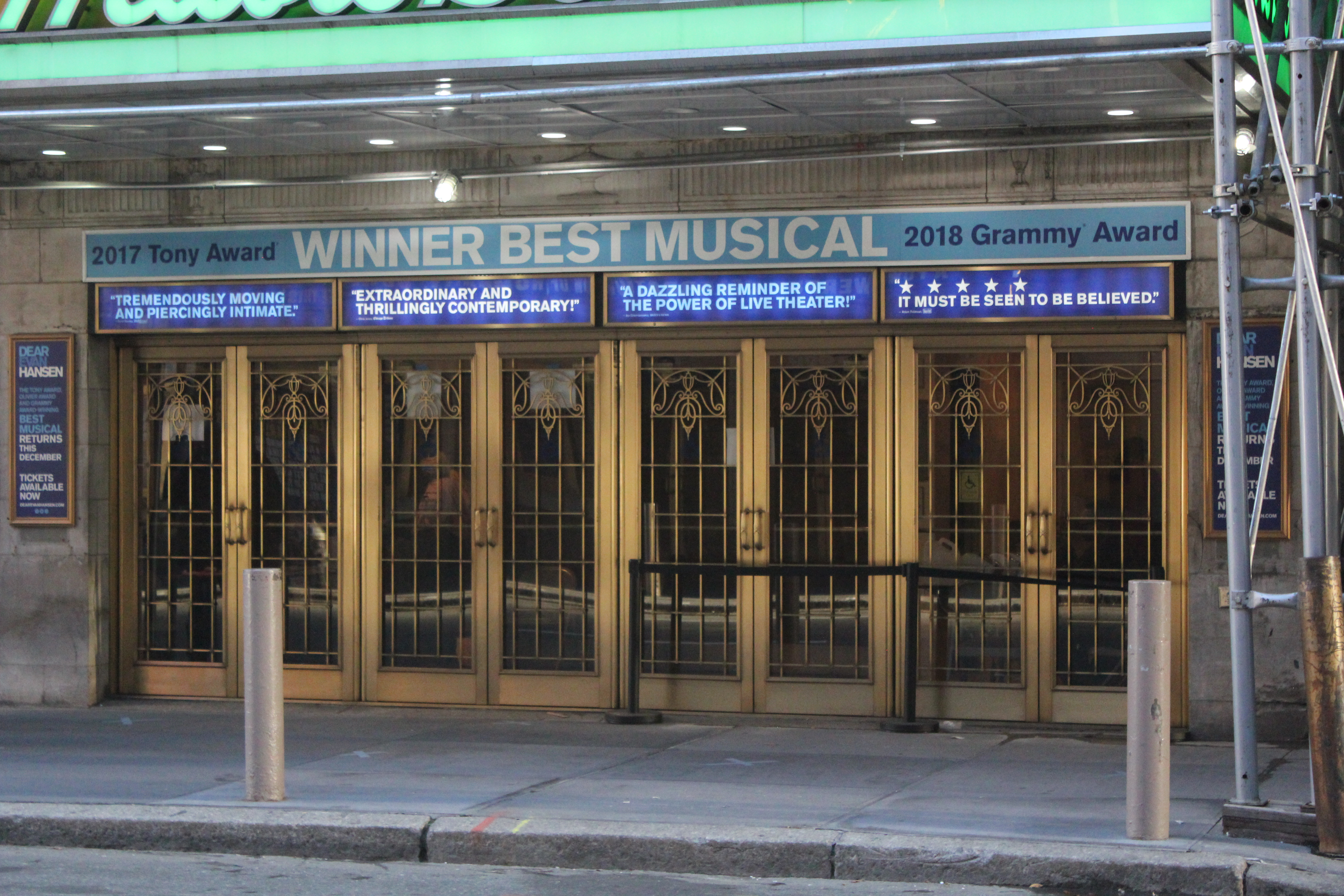
Main entrance (four double doors)

The facade is made of limestone. It is symmetrically arranged, though the theater is shorter than its width. For the design of the facade, Crane drew from both Palladian and neo-Georgian motifs. The facade's largest feature is a double-height central colonnade at the second and third floors. According to theatrical historian Ken Bloom, the facade design was inspired by that of the Chestnut Street Theatre in Philadelphia.

The easternmost side on 45th Street includes four pairs of glass and bronze doors leading to the ticket lobby. There are bronze sign boards on either side, and the entrance is topped by a marquee. Just west of the ticket-lobby entrance is a single doorway. The center of the ground story includes three pairs of glass and bronze doors from the auditorium. There are wood-and-glass sign boards on either side of the central doors, with colonettes on either side and sheet metal-wood pediments above them. A bronze fire-escape gate, accessed by two granite steps, and two wide sign boards are to the west of the center doors. The westernmost part of the facade contains a double door, a narrow sign board, and a single door. These doors, adjacent to the Imperial Theatre's entrance, constitute the stage doors. Above the ground floor is a horizontal band course with motifs of swags, urns, and vertical bars.

At the second and third floors is a colonnade between a pair of outer bays. The colonnade has four fluted columns, which are topped by Corinthian-style decorative capitals. The auditorium facade is slightly recessed behind the colonnade, creating a gallery, which is shielded by decorative iron railings between the columns. The recessed gallery contains the auditorium's fire escape, with stairs leading down to ground level. There are also three double doorways with stone surrounds, which exit onto the gallery. Above each doorway is a frieze with urns and swags; there is a triangular pediment in the outer doorways and scrolled pediment in the center doorway. A pair of pilasters flanks each of the outer bays, with Corinthian capitals atop each pilaster. The second-floor window of each outer bay is a Palladian window, which contains sash window panes. The tympanum is divided into three sections, with an arched tympanum above the center section. The third story has a rectangular sash window with a molded frame. A vertical sign hangs from the easternmost bay on the upper stories.

The top of the facade has a frieze with rosette motifs, as well as a cornice with dentils and modillions. Above the facade is a sloping slate roof with several projecting dormers for windows. There is also a roof balustrade with cast-iron and wrought-iron railings.

=== Auditorium ===
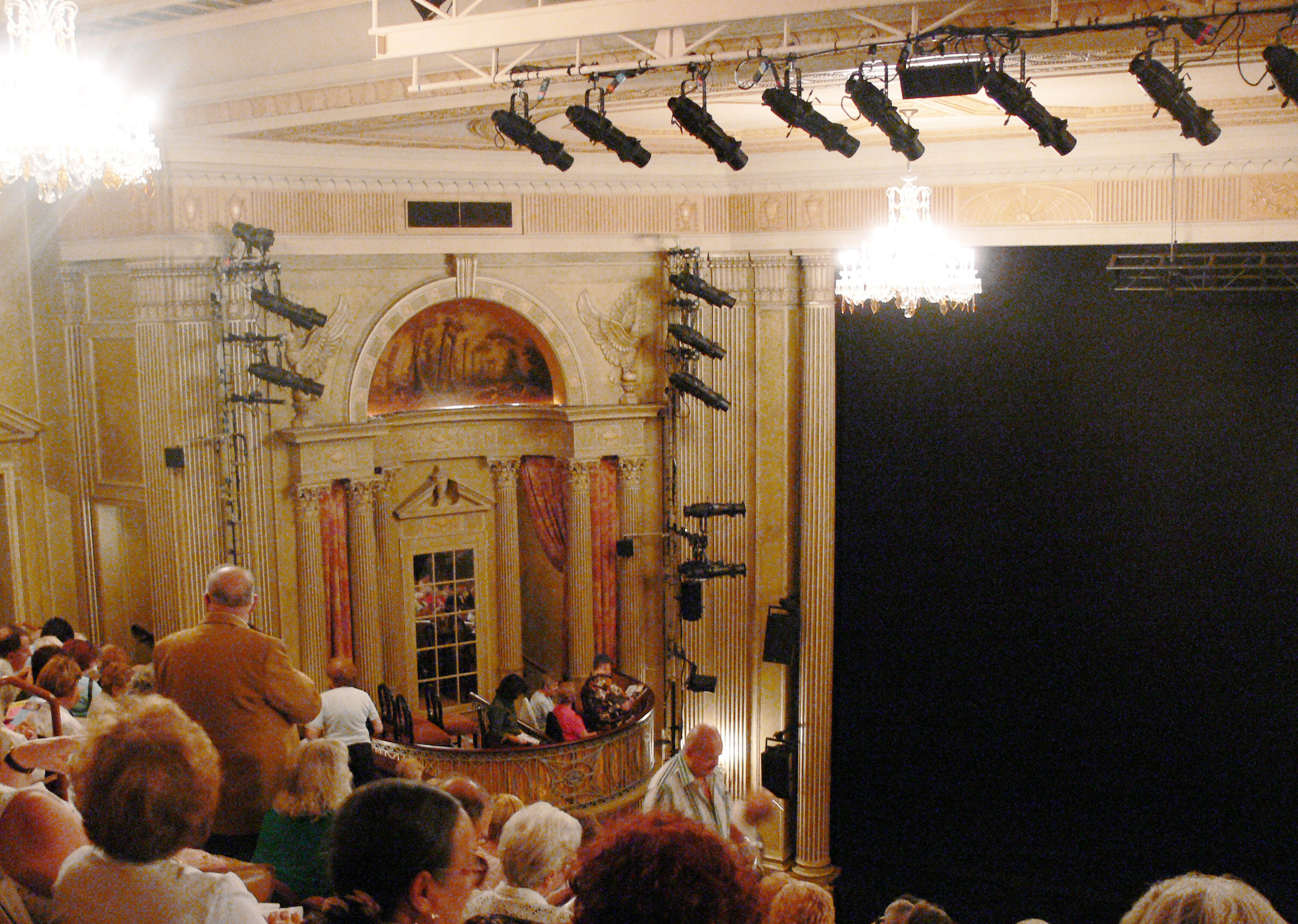
Auditorium as seen from balcony level, looking toward the left-hand box

The auditorium has an orchestra level, one balcony, boxes, and a stage behind the proscenium arch. The auditorium is wider than its depth, and the space is designed with plaster decorations in high relief. According to the Shubert Organization, the auditorium has 1,025 seats; meanwhile, The Broadway League cites a capacity of 1,009 seats and Playbill cites 984 seats. The discrepancy arises from the fact that there are 1,009 physical seats and 16 standing-only spots. The physical seats are divided into 538 seats in the orchestra, 455 at the balcony, and 16 in the boxes. The orchestra seating includes 35 seats in the orchestra pit at the front of the stage. The original color scheme was ivory and dark green. The carpets and curtain were designed in a coral color.

==== Seating areas ====
The rear (east) end of the orchestra contains a shallow promenade, and the orchestra level is raked. The rear wall of the promenade (corresponding with the orchestra's aisles) has doorways with Corinthian-style piers, above which is an entablature in the Adam style. The north end of the promenade has a stair that rises to the balcony's foyer, as well as a double stair that leads down to a basement lounge. Both stairs have Adam-style railings. The orchestra and its promenade contain plasterwork panels on the walls. A standing rail is placed at the rear of the orchestra. No boxes were installed at orchestra level per Harris and Berlin's request.

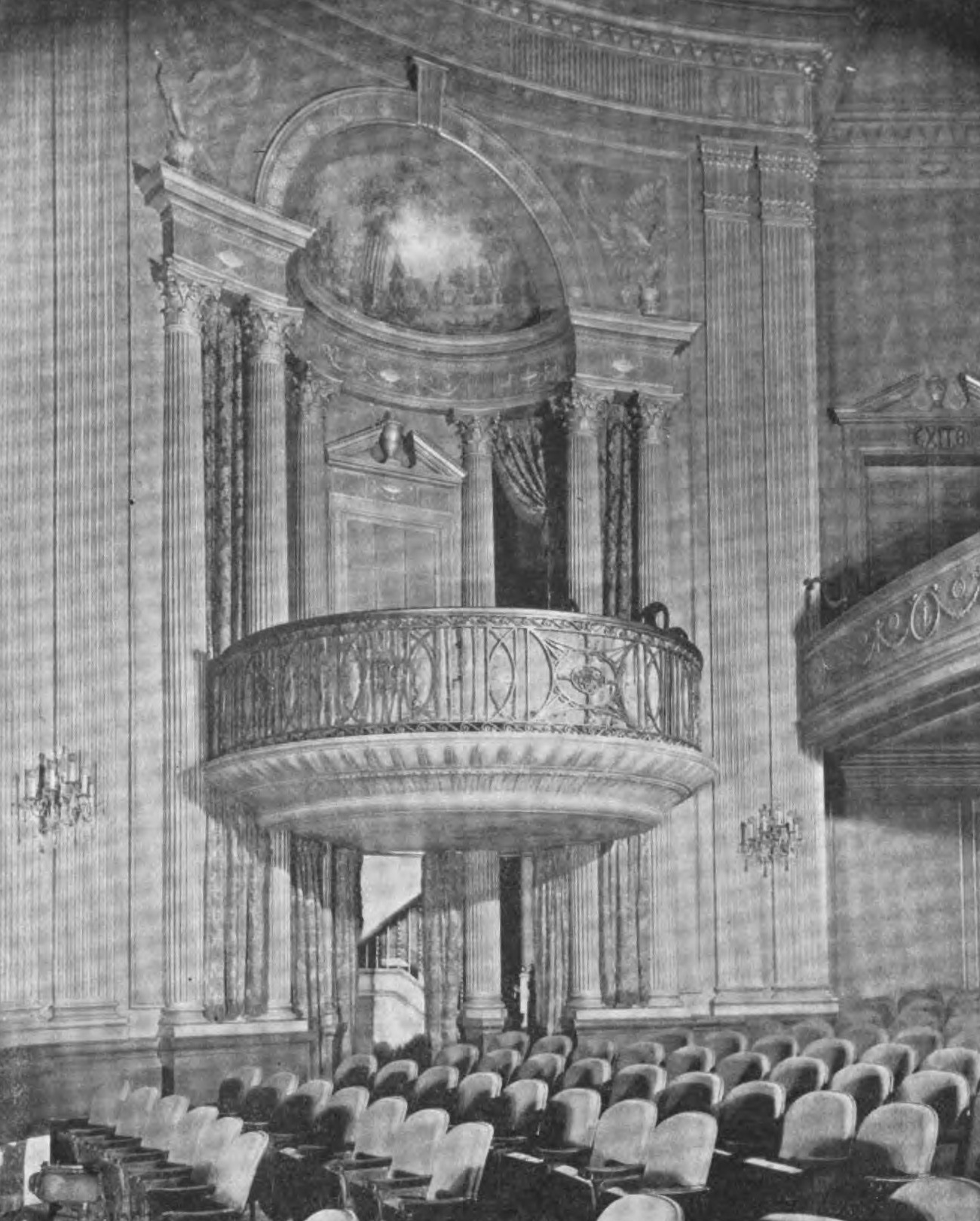
Box detail

The balcony level is raked and contains plasterwork panels on the walls. An Adam-style entablature runs above the top of the balcony wall, wrapping around to the tops of the boxes and proscenium. The balcony front curves outward and has vine and flower motifs, as well as medallions depicting female characters. Modern light boxes are in front of the balcony, and a technical booth is at the rear. The balcony's soffit, or underside, is divided into panels that contain plaster medallions with light fixtures, as well as air-conditioning vents. The auditorium was originally lit by five-armed sconces on the walls, which were replaced in the 1960s with imitation brass sconces. The original sconces were described in American Architect and Architecture as "Dutch brass with amber crystals".

On either side of the proscenium is an archway with a single box at the balcony level. The boxes were described in American Architect as having "a very decided decorative charm to the motive of the proscenium treatment". Each box is semicircular and is cantilevered from the wall; they are accessed from stair halls leading from the orchestra. The boxes' archways are supported by six Corinthian columns, three on each side, and are additionally flanked by paired Corinthian pilasters. Within each archway, the two center columns flank mirrored panels, which in turn are topped by broken pediments with urns. The fronts of the boxes contain Adam-style metal railings, originally ornamented in silver-gray. An entablature rises above the box seats, topped by a half-dome with a pastoral mural. These murals depict classical ruins. The half-domes are flanked by spandrels with decorations of eagles spreading their wings.

==== Other design features ====
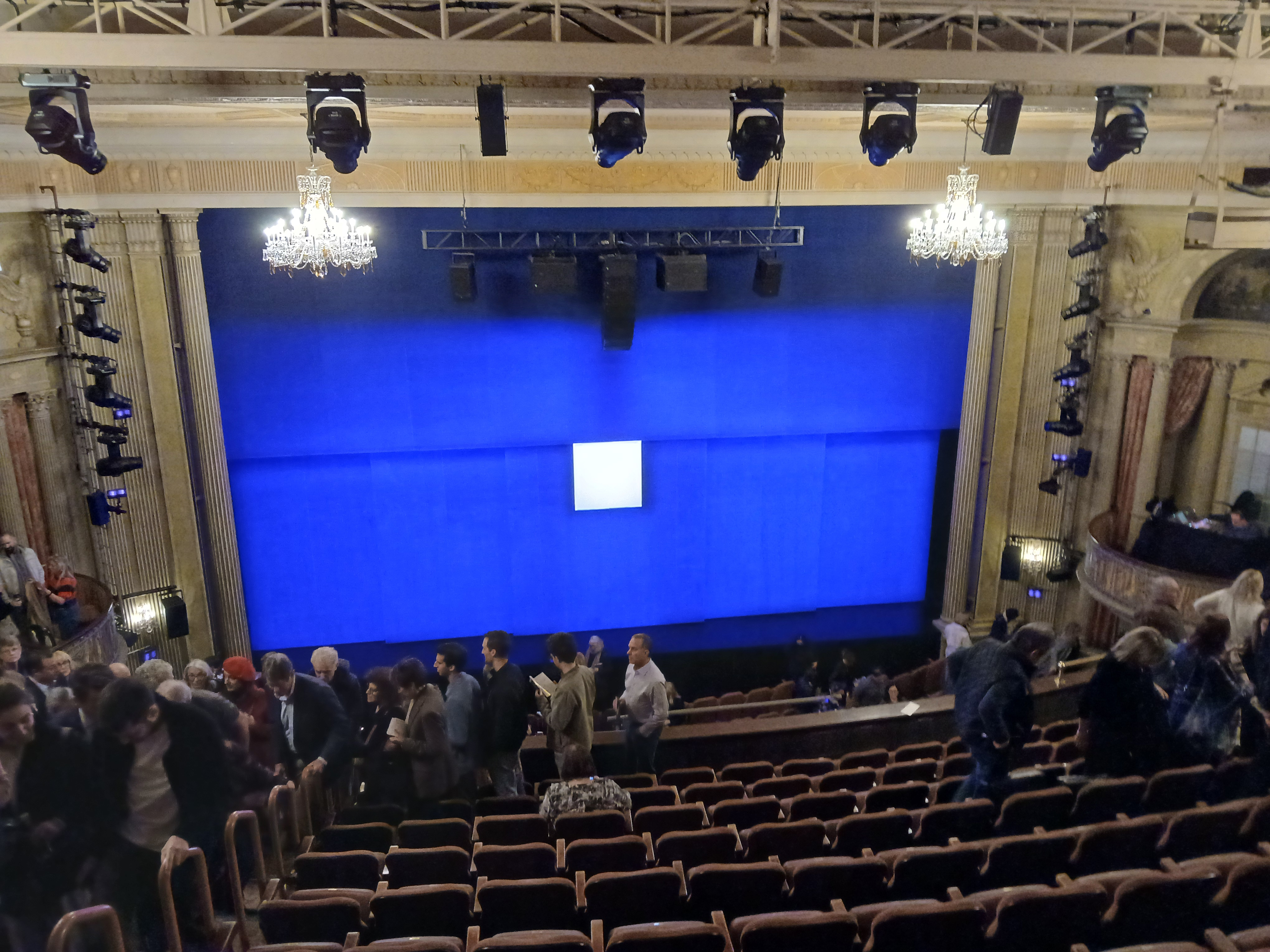
The flat proscenium arch seen from the upper mezzanine

Next to the boxes is a flat proscenium arch. The archway is flanked by fluted columns and pilasters in the Corinthian style. The top of the archways contains an entablature with Adam-style decorations of urns, vines, fans, and reeds. The proscenium measures about 26 feet (7.9 m) high and 40 feet (12 m) wide. Due to a lack of space backstage, a counterweight system was installed to lift sets and other objects onto the stage. The ceiling contains Adam-style moldings and friezes, which divide it into sections. There are also air-conditioning vents in the ceiling, and four chandeliers originally hung from it. Above the front of the balcony is a wide circular medallion. The rear of the ceiling contains a cove that curves downward onto the wall, supported by modillions at the entablature of the wall.

=== Other interior spaces ===
The Music Box's rear promenade is accessed directly from the lobby, which measures 8 feet (2.4 m) wide and 25 feet (7.6 m) long. The lobby was decorated as a simple space, with pink marble baseboards, marble walls, and a plaster cornice. The cornice was decorated with neo-Georgian ornaments. A bronze box-office booth was placed in the lobby. The lobby has a box office because the theater had no dedicated box office when it opened. The floor was made of alternating gray and pink marble tiles. The lobby was separated from the auditorium itself by draped partitions, which removed the drafts that typically occurred behind the last row of seats.

At the balcony level is a mezzanine. This level contained Berlin's studio, as well as ladies' retiring rooms, telephone rooms, and managers' offices. Berlin's studio was designed like an attic, with exposed ceiling rafters, as well as wainscoted walls and a stone fireplace mantel.

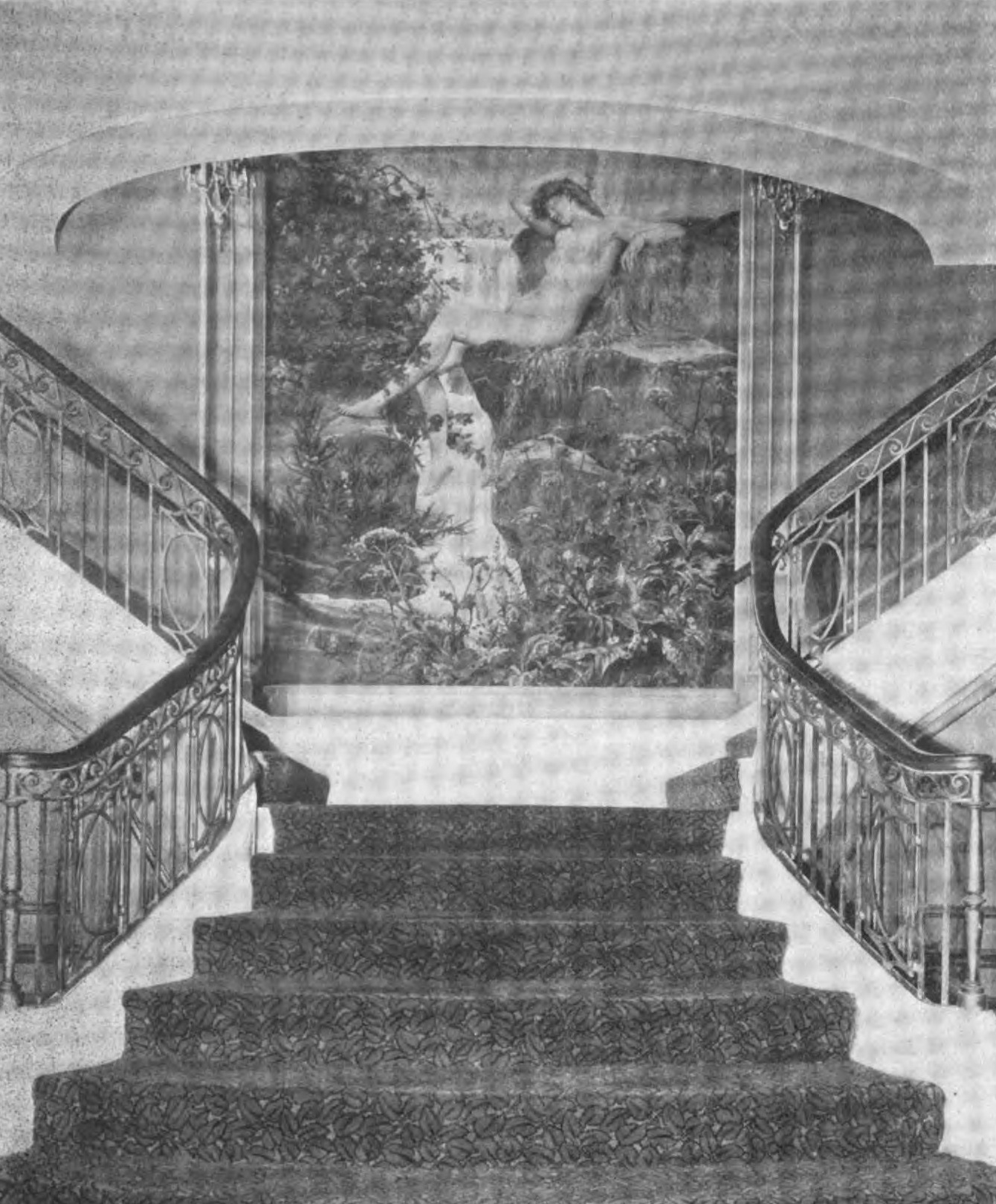
Stair from the basement lounge to the foyer

Below the auditorium is a basement lounge. Its lavish design contrasted with the lounges of other Broadway theaters, which generally received little attention. Architecture and Building magazine described the lounge as being in the Queen Anne style, "developed more as if in a dwelling than in a club or public place". The staircase to the basement lounge is made of marble and contains an intermediate landing. A tapestry is mounted on the stair landing. The tapestry depicts a reclining figure of a nude woman next to a waterfall. A mirrored panel was hung on the lounge's wall, opposite the tapestry. Siena marble fireplace mantels, with mirrors above them, were placed at each end of the lounge. The basement also has the theater's restrooms.

== History ==
Times Square became the epicenter for large-scale theater productions between 1900 and the Great Depression. During the 1900s and 1910s, many theaters in Midtown Manhattan were developed by the Shubert brothers, one of the major theatrical syndicates of the time. Meanwhile, Sam H. Harris was a producer and Irving Berlin was a songwriter. Prior to the development of the Music Box Theatre, Harris had partnered with George Cohan in the development of several theaters and productions in the 1900s and 1910s.

=== Development and early years ===
==== Venue for revues ====
According to one account, the name for the Music Box Theatre arose from a conversation between Sam H. Harris and Irving Berlin in 1919. Harris had suggested building a theater, to which Berlin suggested the name "Music Box". Harris liked the name and suggested that Berlin could write a song for the new theater. In March 1920, Harris and Berlin bought the properties at 239 to 245 West 45th Street from L. and A. Pincus and M. L. Goldstone. They then announced plans to build the Music Box Theatre on the site. By that May, Crane had prepared plans for the theater. Harris planned to stage twice-yearly revues, and he subsequently ended his long-running partnership with George M. Cohan. Hassard Short was named as the first general stage director, spending over $240,000 on the first show. The Music Box ultimately cost more than $1 million, $400,000 for the building itself and $600,000 for the land; the theater overran its original budget by about $300,000. The Music Box was one of the only Broadway theaters to be built for specific producers' work.

The Music Box Theatre opened on September 22, 1921, with performances of Music Box Revue. The new theater was praised by both architectural and theatrical critics, and several architectural publications printed pictures of the theater. These included the American Architect and the Architectural Review, which called the theater's design "remarkable" both in design and layout. The New-York Tribune called the facade "singularly successful in its expression of the interior", while Architecture and Building said the "delicacy of domestic architecture" was fitting for the Music Box's design. Among theatrical critics, Jack Lait referred to the Music Box as the "daintiest theatre in America" in Variety magazine. Other reviewers said the theater was "unparalleled" in design and had "dignified architectural decorations" in contrast to other theaters. The comedian Sam Bernard said simply, "It stinks from class." In his autobiography, producer Moss Hart said that the Music Box was "everybody's dream of a theatre", enhancing the quality of the productions staged there.

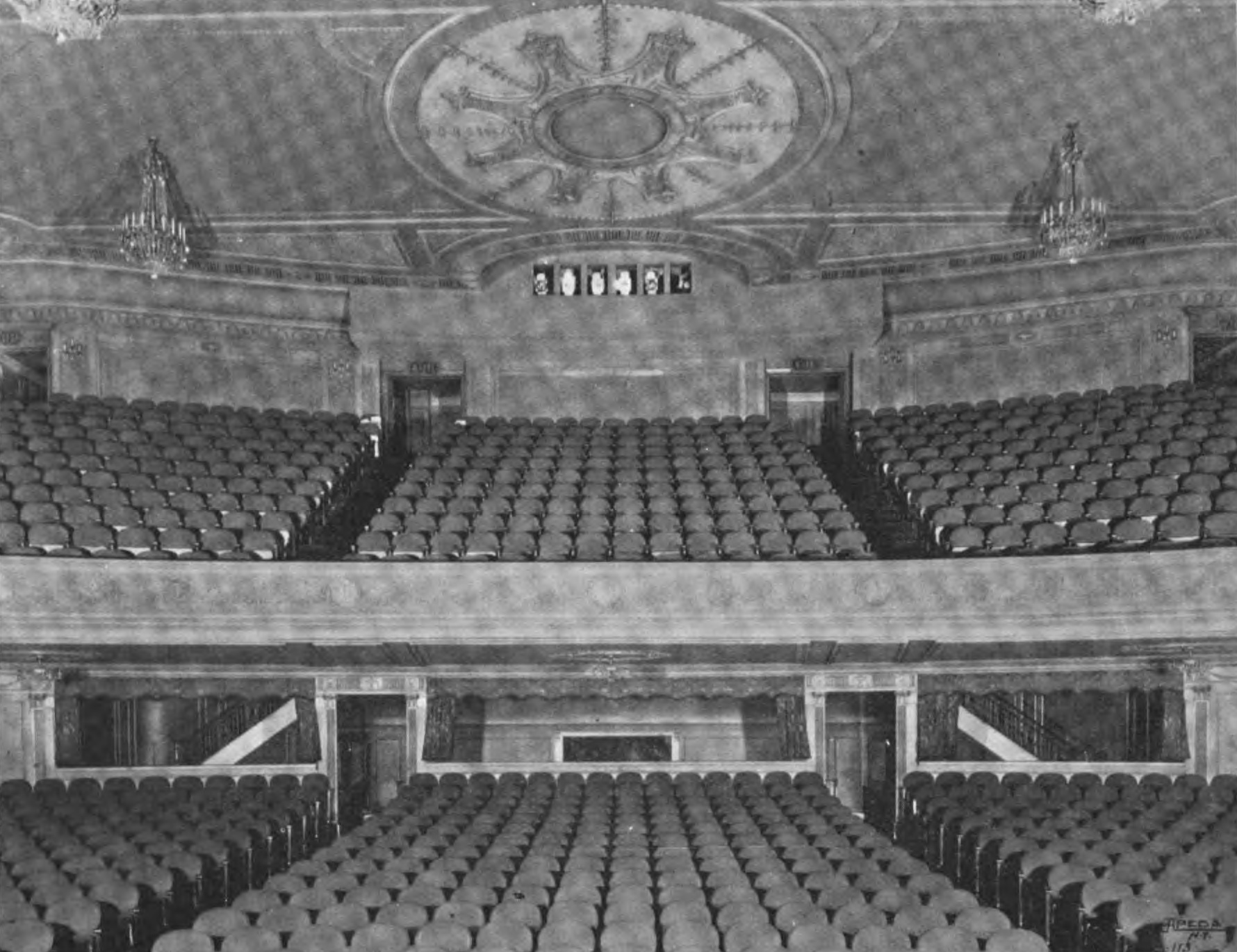
View of the auditorium

Film executive Joseph M. Schenck originally was a partner in the Music Box Theatre with Berlin and Harris, though he transferred his stake to the Shubert brothers not long afterward. For the first three years of its operation, the Music Box exclusively hosted the Music Box Revue. The inaugural edition in 1921 starred Bernard and Berlin. Three subsequent editions of the Music Box Revue were hosted in as many years, and each subsequent edition gradually declined in quality. Among the performers who appeared multiple times were the Brox Sisters, Clark and McCullough, Florence Moore, Grace Moore, Joseph Santley, and Ivy Sawyer. One notable performance was the 1924 edition, which featured Fanny Brice of the Ziegfeld Follies. Earl Carroll's Vanities was also staged in 1924, becoming the second production to be presented at the Music Box. Its producer, Earl Carroll, was briefly jailed in November 1924 after showing "obscene" photos outside the Music Box.

==== 1920s and 1930s hit shows ====
The comedy The Cradle Snatchers, with Humphrey Bogart, was the first play to be staged at the Music Box, opening in 1925. With close to 500 performances, it was a hit. More generally, of the productions staged in the Music Box in its first decade, only two flops with less than 100 performances were staged, both of which ran immediately after The Cradle Snatchers closed. The first was Gentle Grafters in October 1926, while the second was Mozart that November. This was followed by the comedy Chicago, which premiered in late 1926 with Francine Larrimore and Charles Bickford, and a run of the melodrama The Spider in 1927, which transferred from a neighboring theater. By the end of 1927, Hassard Short had given up his stake in managing the Music Box. The play Paris Bound also premiered in 1927, followed the next year by the similarly named Paris with Irène Bordoni. The last show in the 1920s was The Little Show, which premiered in 1929.

The Music Box staged the French play Topaze with Frank Morgan in 1930, followed by the comedy The Third Little Show with Ernest Truex and Beatrice Lillie in 1931. The theater largely hosted works by Moss Hart and George S. Kaufman, produced either individually or in partnership, during the 1930s. Immediately following Topaze was Hart and Kaufman's first-ever collaboration, Once in a Lifetime, which premiered in late 1930. Kaufman and Morrie Ryskind collaborated in 1931 for Of Thee I Sing, the first Pulitzer Prize-winning musical, and Kaufman joined Edna Ferber the next year to produce Dinner at Eight, which ran 232 performances. The next year, Berlin and Hart staged the revue As Thousands Cheer, which with 400 performances was lengthy for a Great Depression-era musical. Hart and Kaufman again partnered in 1934 for the play Merrily We Roll Along.

Five plays were performed at the Music Box in 1935. These were Rain, Ceiling Zero, If This Be Treason, a theatrical version of Pride and Prejudice, and finally Kaufman and Katharine Dayton's collaboration First Lady. Kaufman and Ferber collaborated again in the 1936 production Stage Door. This was followed the next year by a short run of Young Madam Conti with Constance Cummings, as well as a Kaufman-directed adaptation of the John Steinbeck novel Of Mice and Men. Two Hart and Kaufman productions were staged in 1938: a transfer of I'd Rather Be Right and the original Sing Out the News. The productions in 1939 began with the Noël Coward revue Set to Music, following which was From Vienna, produced by the Refugee Artists Group. The last hit of the 1930s was Hart and Kaufman's The Man Who Came to Dinner, which had 739 performances through 1941. Irving Berlin subsequently recalled that he and Harris had almost lost control of the otherwise financially-successful Music Box Theatre during the Depression. In spite of this, all but three shows had at least 100 performances in the Music Box's first 25 years.

=== 1940s to 1970s ===
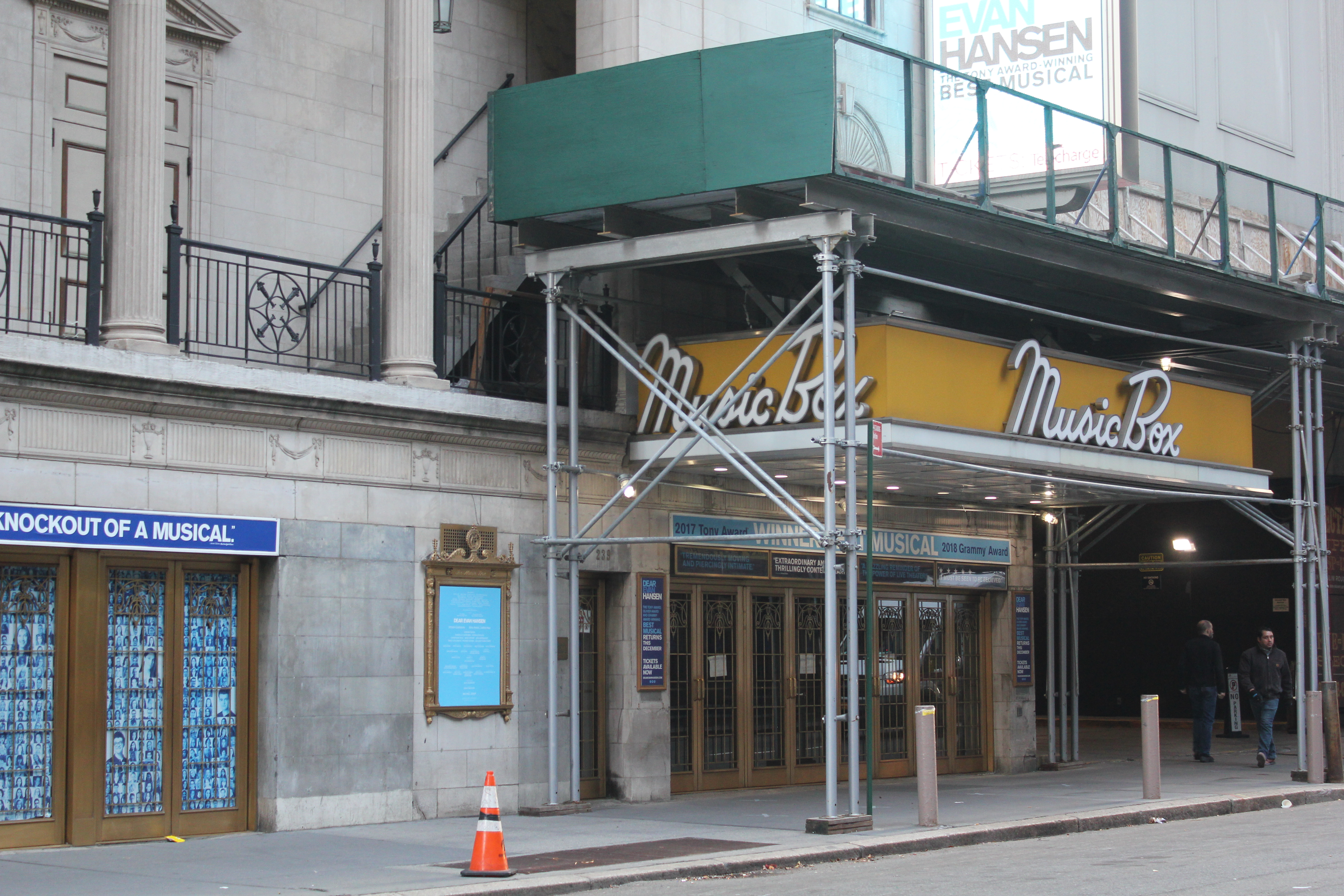
Scaffolding over the entrance

The Music Box Theater underwent several changes in operation during the 1940s. Sam Harris died in July 1941, and his ownership stake in the theater went to his widow Kathleen Marin, pursuant to his will. Additionally, independent producers began to lease the Music Box. The theater also pivoted away from hosting revues and musicals because of its relatively low seating capacity; instead, it mainly hosted small dramas. The burlesque revue Star and Garter opened in 1942, eventually running 609 performances. This was followed in 1944 by a 713-performance run of the comedy I Remember Mama, which featured Marlon Brando in his Broadway debut. Another major production in the 1940s was Summer and Smoke, which premiered in 1948. The next year, the Music Box showed Lost in the Stars, which was the last musical staged at the Music Box until the 1970s.

The long-running comedy Affairs of State transferred to the Music Box from the Royale Theatre in 1950. The same year, Marin sold her one-third ownership stake in the Music Box Theatre to Harris and the Shuberts. (Note: Some sources have cited Harris's widow as having immediately sold the theater to the Berlins and Shuberts.) In 1952, the Music Box staged a transfer of the hit The Male Animal. The playwright William Inge had three highly successful plays during the 1950s, all of which had over 400 performances. First among these was Picnic, which opened in 1953. This was followed by Bus Stop in 1955 and The Dark at the Top of the Stairs in 1957. Besides Inge's productions, the Music Box hosted a transfer of The Solid Gold Cadillac in 1954, as well as Separate Tables in 1956. The decade ended with the 1959 plays Rashomon, featuring Claire Bloom and Rod Steiger, and Five Finger Exercise, featuring Brian Bedford and Jessica Tandy.

In 1961, the Music Box staged A Far Country, featuring Kim Stanley and Steven Hill. The next year saw the opening of the comedy The Beauty Part with Bert Lahr, which flopped during the city's newspaper strike despite critical acclaim. The Music Box staged a more successful production, Dear Me, the Sky Is Falling with Gertrude Berg, the next year. The theater's most successful play of the 1960s was the comedy Any Wednesday, which opened in 1964 and ran for 983 performances. The decade's other hits included Harold Pinter's The Homecoming, which opened in 1967, and There's a Girl in My Soup, which opened later that year.

The British play Sleuth opened in 1970, featuring Keith Baxter and Anthony Quayle; it became the theater's longest-running production with 1,222 performances. When the Music Box celebrated its 50th anniversary the next year, the theater was still largely successful. Berlin said at the time that he still held part-ownership in the Music Box for sentimental reasons. In 1974, the theater staged its first musical in 25 years: Rainbow Jones, which closed after its only performance. It was followed the same year by the comparatively more successful Absurd Person Singular. The Music Box staged a revival of Who's Afraid of Virginia Woolf? in 1976, and it hosted a range of Stephen Sondheim songs in the musical Side by Side by Sondheim the next year. The theater's last production of the 1970s was Deathtrap, which opened in 1978. Deathtrap was ultimately transferred four years later and ran 1,793 total performances.

=== 1980s and 1990s ===
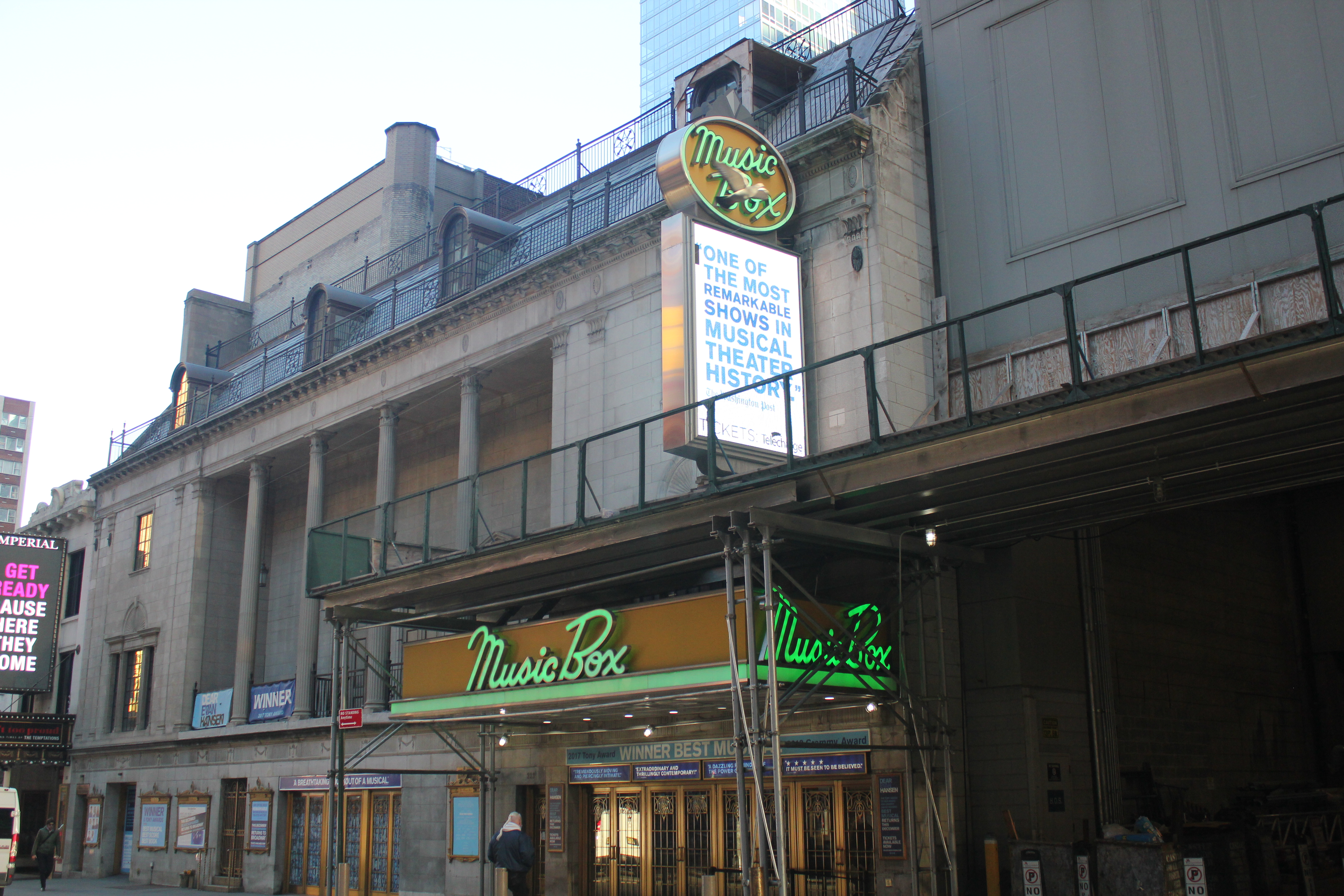
Seen from the east

The Music Box had a major hit in the early 1980s with the religious drama Agnes of God, which premiered in 1982 and had 599 performances with Geraldine Page and Amanda Plummer. By contrast, the theater mostly hosted flops during the mid-1980s. The Music Box hosted a revival of Hay Fever in 1985, followed the next year by a revival of Loot, which was Alec Baldwin's first Broadway appearance. In 1987, the Music Box staged Sweet Sue with Mary Tyler Moore, as well as the Royal Shakespeare Company's hit production Les Liaisons Dangereuses. This was followed by several short-lived productions, including Mail and Spoils of War in 1988, as well as Welcome to the Club in 1989. The decade ended with the hit A Few Good Men. Irving Berlin continued to co-own the theater until he died in 1989 at the age of 101; in his final years, Berlin would contact the Shuberts to ask them about the theater's receipts.

The New York City Landmarks Preservation Commission (LPC) had started to consider protecting the Music Box as a landmark in 1982, with discussions continuing over the next several years. The LPC designated the Music Box's facade and interior as a landmark on December 8, 1987. This was part of the commission's wide-ranging effort in 1987 to grant landmark status to Broadway theaters. The New York City Board of Estimate ratified the designations in March 1988. The Shuberts, the Nederlanders, and Jujamcyn collectively sued the LPC in June 1988 to overturn the landmark designations of 22 theaters, including the Music Box, on the merit that the designations severely limited the extent to which the theaters could be modified. The lawsuit was escalated to the New York Supreme Court and the Supreme Court of the United States, but these designations were ultimately upheld in 1992.

In the 1990s, the Music Box continued to have many relatively short runs. The solo play Lucifer's Child with Julie Harris played a limited engagement in April 1991, and Park Your Car in Harvard Yard opened the same year with Judith Ivey and Jason Robards. The next year, the Music Box staged A Small Family Business, which ran for a little over one month. A more successful production was Blood Brothers, opening in 1993 and running 893 performances over the next two years. In addition, a plaque commemorating Irving Berlin was installed at the Music Box in 1994. The musical Swinging on a Star opened in 1995. The next year, the Music Box staged the musical State Fair, the latter of which was the final Broadway show produced by David Merrick. Subsequently, Barrymore ran 238 performances in 1997, and The Diary of Anne Frank opened later that year, running through the next year with 221 performances. Finally, the Music Box staged Closer in 1999, with 173 performances.

=== 2000s to present ===
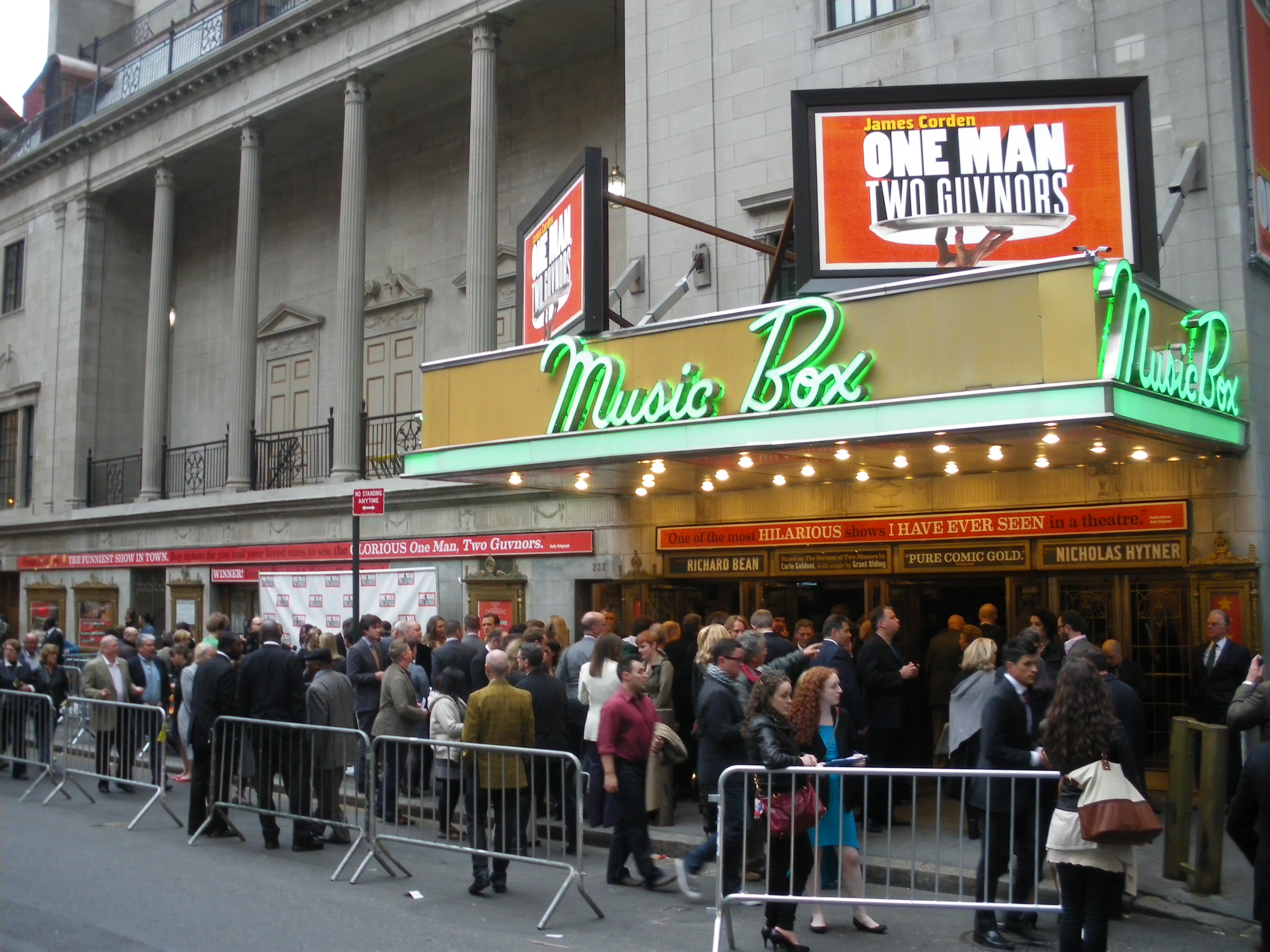
A crowd gathered outside the marquee in 2012

The Music Box's tendency for short production runs continued into the 2000s. A revival of the Shakespeare play Macbeth closed in June 2000 after 13 performances, and a more successful production came later that year with The Dinner Party, which ran 364 performances. The 19th-century drama Fortune's Fool was staged in 2002, as was short-lived comedy Amour. As part of a settlement with the United States Department of Justice in 2003, the Shuberts agreed to improve disabled access at their 16 landmarked Broadway theaters, including the Music Box. The Music Box hosted Cat on a Hot Tin Roof in 2003 and Dame Edna: Back with a Vengeance in 2004, as well as Antony Sher's solo Primo and the musical In My Life in 2005. These were followed in 2006 by Festen and The Vertical Hour. Meanwhile, the Shubert Organization and Berlin's estate continued to operate the theater jointly. The unusual arrangement, which led to jokes that the Shuberts owned sixteen and a half theaters, continued until 2007, when the Berlin estate sold its interest to the Shuberts.

The Music Box's productions at the end of the 2000s included Deuce and The Farnsworth Invention in 2007; a transfer of the long-running August: Osage County from the Imperial Theatre in 2008; and Superior Donuts in 2009. This was followed by Lend Me a Tenor and La Bête in 2010; Jerusalem and Private Lives in 2011; and One Man, Two Guvnors and Dead Accounts in 2012. The musical Pippin opened in 2013 and ran for two years. Further productions in the mid-2010s included The Heidi Chronicles and King Charles III in 2015, as well as Shuffle Along, or, the Making of the Musical Sensation of 1921 and All That Followed in 2016. The musical Dear Evan Hansen opened at the Music Box in December 2016. The theater closed on March 12, 2020, due to the COVID-19 pandemic; it reopened on December 11, 2021, with performances of Dear Evan Hansen. The theater also hosted a memorial service to the late Shubert chairman Philip J. Smith in March 2022. Due to poor ticket sales, Dear Evan Hansen closed in September 2022. The next month, the theater hosted a limited run of Gabriel Byrne's solo show Walking with Ghosts.

A revival of Bob Fosse's Dancin' opened at the Music Box in March 2023, running for two months; it was followed that September by the play Purlie Victorious, which ran for five months. The musical Suffs opened at the theater in April 2024, followed by a three-month run of the play The Picture of Dorian Gray in March 2025 and a 17-week run of the play Art in September 2025. During the run of Art, as part of a fundraiser on November 10, 2025, the Music Box Theatre hosted a special reading of the screenplay for the film Moonstruck. Afterward, the play Giant opened at the theater in March 2026.

== Notable productions ==
Productions are listed by the year of their first performance. The Music Box Revue, which has had multiple editions, is listed by the years of the first performances of each edition.

Notable productions at the theater
Opening year	Name	Refs.
1921–1924	Music Box Revue	
1924	Earl Carroll's Vanities	
1926	Chicago	
1928	Paris	
1929	The Little Show	
1930	Topaze	
1930	Once in a Lifetime	
1931	Of Thee I Sing	
1932	Dinner at Eight	
1933	As Thousands Cheer	
1934	Merrily We Roll Along	
1935	Rain	
1935	Ceiling Zero	
1935	If This Be Treason	
1935	Pride and Prejudice	
1935	First Lady	
1936	Stage Door	
1937	Of Mice and Men	
1938	I'd Rather Be Right	
1939	Set to Music	
1939	The Man Who Came to Dinner	
1941	The Land Is Bright	
1942	A Kiss for Cinderella	
1942	Star and Garter	
1944	Over 21	
1944	I Remember Mama	
1946	A Flag Is Born	
1948	The Linden Tree	
1948	Summer and Smoke	
1949	They Knew What They Wanted	
1949	Mrs. Gibbons' Boys	
1949	Lost in the Stars	
1950	Daphne Laureola	
1950	Affairs of State	
1952	Much Ado About Nothing	
1952	The Male Animal	
1953	Picnic	
1954	The Solid Gold Cadillac	
1955	Bus Stop	
1956	The Ponder Heart	
1956	Separate Tables	
1957	Miss Lonelyhearts	
1957	The Dark at the Top of the Stairs	
1959	Rashomon	
1959	Five Finger Exercise	
1961	A Far Country	
1961	Daughter of Silence	
1962	The Beauty Part	
1963	Semi-Detached	
1963	Love and Kisses	
1964	Any Wednesday	
1966	Wait Until Dark	
1967	The Homecoming	
1967	There's a Girl in My Soup	
1968	Lovers	
1968	Harkness Ballet	
1969	The Watering Place	
1970	Sleuth	
1973	Veronica's Room	
1974	Absurd Person Singular	
1976	Who's Afraid of Virginia Woolf?	
1976	Comedians	
1977	Side by Side by Sondheim	
1978	Deathtrap	
1982	Agnes of God	
1984	Open Admissions	
1985	The Octette Bridge Club	
1985	Hay Fever	
1986	Loot	
1987	Sweet Sue	
1987	Les Liaisons Dangereuses	
1989	Welcome to the Club	
1989	A Few Good Men	
1992	A Small Family Business	
1993	Blood Brothers	
1995	Swinging on a Star	
1996	State Fair	
1997	Barrymore	
1997	The Diary of Anne Frank	
1999	Closer	
1999	Amadeus	
2000	Macbeth	
2000	The Dinner Party	
2002	Fortune's Fool	
2002	Amour	
2003	Cat on a Hot Tin Roof	
2005	In My Life	
2006	Festen	
2006	The Vertical Hour	
2007	Deuce	
2007	The Farnsworth Invention	
2008	August: Osage County	
2009	Superior Donuts	
2010	Lend Me a Tenor	
2010	La Bête	
2011	Jerusalem	
2011	Private Lives	
2012	One Man, Two Guvnors	
2012	Dead Accounts	
2013	Pippin	
2015	The Heidi Chronicles	
2015	King Charles III	
2016	Shuffle Along, or, the Making of the Musical Sensation of 1921 and All That Followed	
2016	Dear Evan Hansen	
2022	Walking with Ghosts	
2023	Dancin'	
2023	Purlie Victorious	
2024	Suffs	
2025	The Picture of Dorian Gray	
2025	Art	
2026	Giant	

== Box office record ==
Dear Evan Hansen achieved the box office record for the Music Box Theatre. The production grossed $2,119,371 over the eight performances during the week ending December 31, 2017. The same production had also achieved a record earlier in the year, making that record the highest gross for a Broadway house that seats under 1,000.

== See also ==
- Brown Theatre, a theater in Louisville, Kentucky, whose design is based on the Music Box Theatre
- List of Broadway theatres
- List of New York City Designated Landmarks in Manhattan from 14th to 59th Streets
