= Satan's Angel =

American exotic dancer

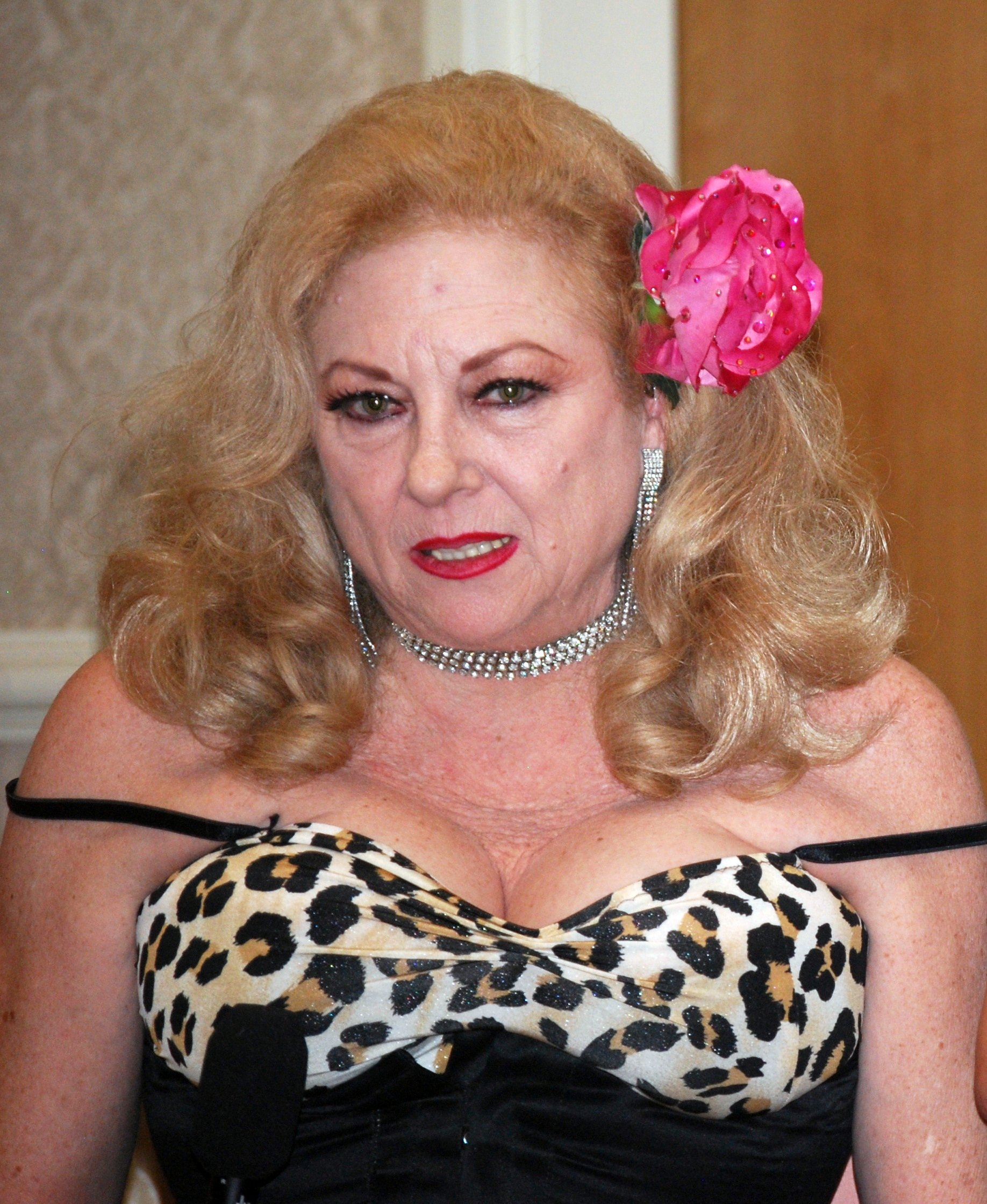
- Satan's Angel at the Burlesque Hall of Fame in 2009
- Born: Angel Cecelia Helene Walker; September 18, 1944; San Francisco, California, U.S.
- Died: April 11, 2019 (aged 74)
- Occupation: Dancer

Angel Cecelia Helene Walker (September 18, 1944 – April 11, 2019) was an American exotic dancer specializing in stripping and burlesque under her stage name Satan's Angel.

== Career ==
Satan's Angel started dancing in San Francisco in 1961, after winning an amateur strip contest at North Beach nightclub Moulin Rouge. Her full moniker was Satan's Angel, the Devil's Own Mistress, Queen of the Fire Tassels. She also danced under the stage names Tassel Tossin' Angel, Angel Dahl, Angel the Body, Satana Angel, and Satin Angel.

Satan's Angel's signature act was to light her tassels aflame, "then extinguishing the flames by means of strenuous mammary rotation". She would sometimes twirl five tassels at a time—two on her nipples, two on her buttocks, and one on her navel.

She performed in San Francisco in the 1960s, dancing at small and bigger nightclubs including the Esquire, the Galaxie and the Condor Club. She was also bass player in The Hummingbirds, an all girl topless cover band which performed nightly at Tipsy's in North Beach.

Later, in Las Vegas in the 1970s and into the mid 1980s, she was cast by big-name burlesque promoters like Barry Ashton and Harold Minsky and danced at the Palomino Club, The Aladdin, Silver Slipper, and the Minsky. She also toured the United States and the rest of the world with her act.

When asked why she chose to pursue a career in burlesque, she said she wanted the glamorous life of Gypsy Rose Lee. She also said she borrowed artistic elements from Mae West, Lili St. Cyr, Ann Corio, Sally Keith, and Carrie Finnell to create her stage character Satan's Angel.

She retired from burlesque in 1985, after twenty-four years, but came out of retirement in 2002. Later she performed in the Miss Exotic World Pageant—in 2005 as part of the Legends section of the program, and in 2006 as part of the Cavalcade of Classic Stars. She also appeared at the annual burlesque convention Tease-O-Rama and in multiple neo-burlesque shows.

In addition to performing, Satan's Angel gave classes in burlesque striptease and fire tassel twirling. Strip tease and burlesque dancer Catherine D'lish has called Satan's Angel "a trailblazer in her profession".
