= Pasties =

Adhesive patches worn to cover the nipples and areolae

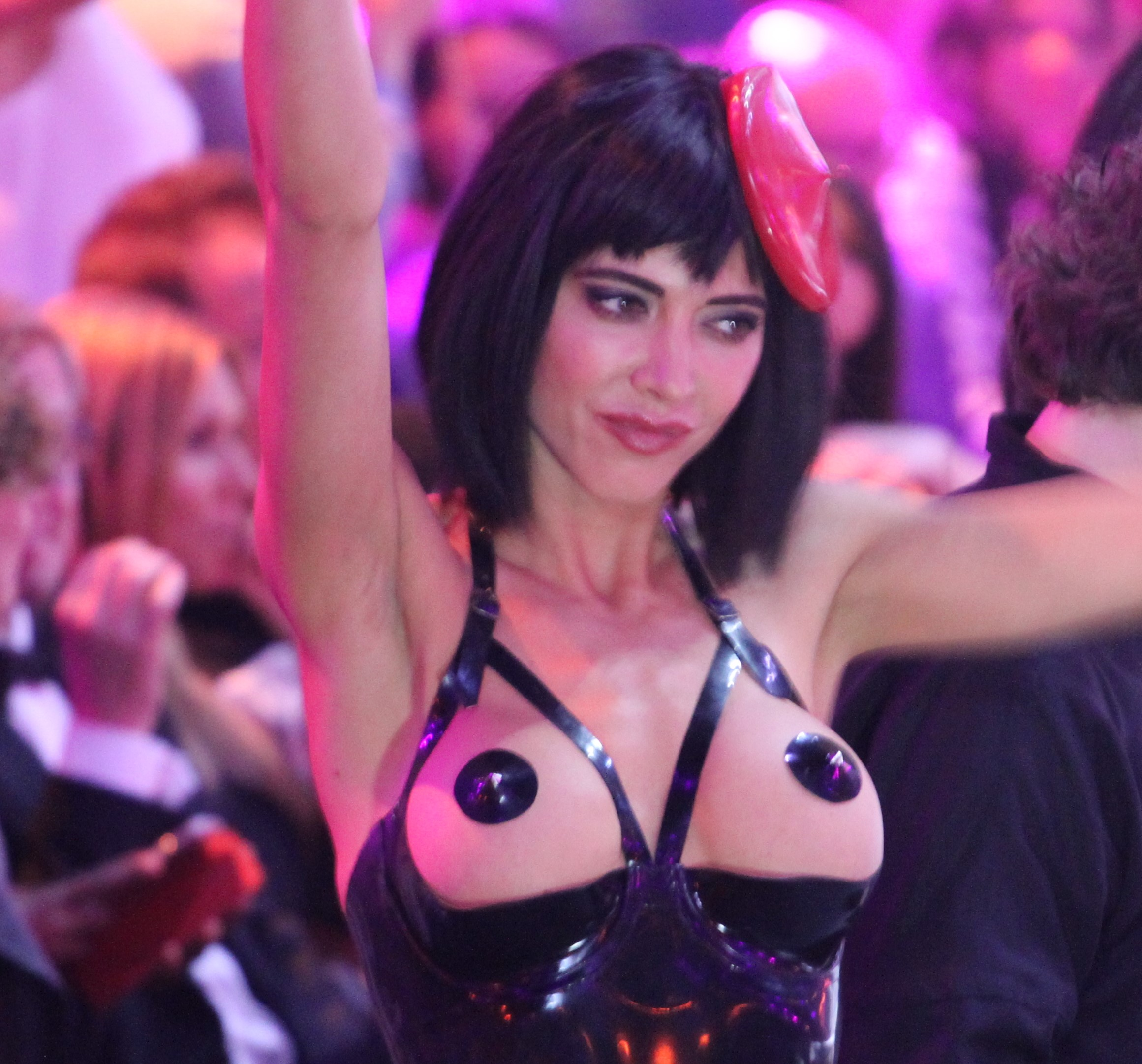
Swiss artist Milo Moiré performs, wearing pasties and a cut-out bra top, 2016

Pasties (/ˈpeɪstiz/; singular pasty or pastie; from the word "paste") are patches that cover a person's nipples and areolae, typically self-adhesive or affixed with adhesive. They are usually worn in pairs. They originated as part of burlesque shows, allowing dancers to perform fully topless without exposing the nipples in order to provide a commercial form of bare-breasted entertainment. Pasties are also, at times, used while sunbathing, worn by strippers and showgirls, or as a form of protest during women's rights events such as Go Topless Day. In some cases this is to avoid potential prosecution under indecency laws.

As well as being used as an undergarment in lieu of a bra, pasties are also worn visibly as a fashion accessory where it is desirable to show the breasts but not the nipples, and are sometimes called nipple stickers. Pasties are sometimes worn by bikini baristas, staff hired to serve coffee from roadside huts while wearing lingerie, thongs, or skimpy swimwear.

== Design ==
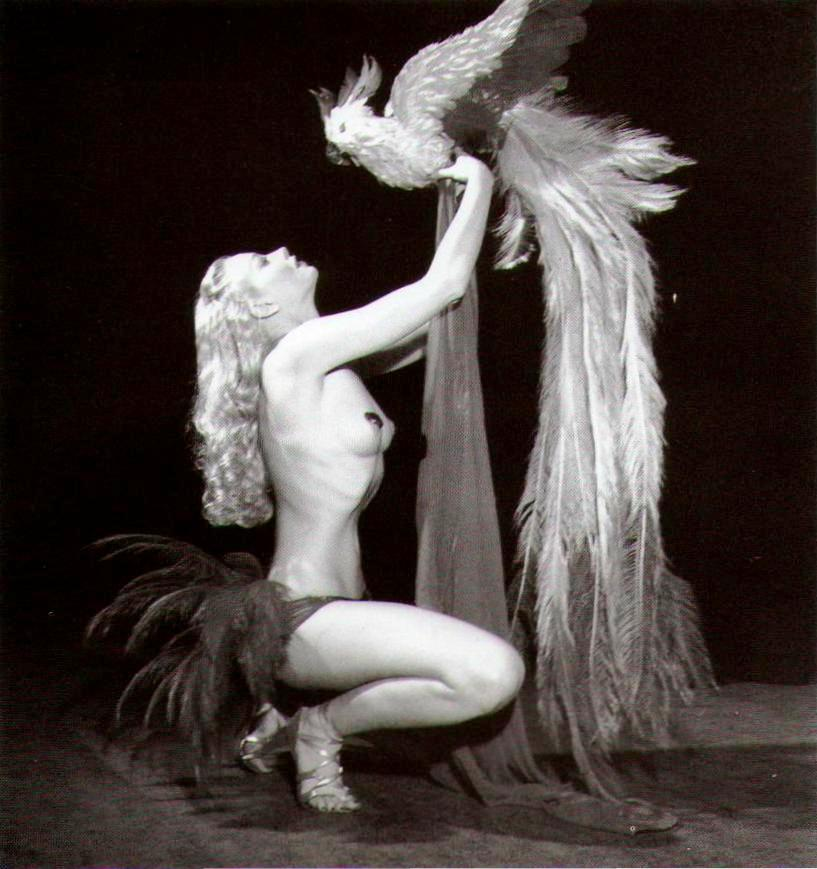
Lili St. Cyr wearing pasties during a performance in Canada (1946)

Pasties come in a variety of colors, shapes, and sizes. They can be made from a variety of materials, including craft foam, artificial leather, buckram and plastic. Some are skin-colored while others are produced with decorative designs on them. They are often smaller in countries such as Japan than they are in America as they are typically not much larger than the areola. No straps are used to hold pasties in place, so they require a tape or glue fixative. This is often gum arabic, although other types of glue are sometimes used including liquid latex and eyelash extension glue. Nevertheless, they can fall off as a result of sweating or movement. The burlesque dancer Candy Cotton reported that a pastie she was wearing flew off into the audience during her act.

Pasties are typically designed to be left on for hours rather than days. Removing them can be painful, particularly if they have been left on for too long. Adhesive removers are sometimes used to help remove them, though these are not usually designed for human skin. The adhesive used to attach pasties cause problems for people with sensitive skin. The burlesque dancer Lili St. Cyr found that her nipples often hurt when she removed her pasties at the end of the night, and in consequence she watered down the glue that she used. To reduce the chances of an allergic reaction, modern pasties are mostly attached with glue designed for cosmetic use or are held in place using double-sided fashion tape. People with sensitive skin often prefer hypoallergenic nipple covers. The most popular and common type are made from the hypoallergenic polymer silicone, rather than materials such as latex that can cause allergic reactions. The availability of suitable adhesives was a necessary precursor to their introduction, and their name derives from the word paste. Modern pasties are often self-adhesive. Some are for single-use, while others are washable and can be reused.

== Entertainment ==
Early versions of the pastie were worn by belly dancers and exotic performers at the 1893 World's Fair. These consisted of small metal plates covering the front of the breasts, and were often decorated with gems or metallic details where the nipples would be. They were subsequently worn by some circus performers during their acts.

The modern form of the pastie first appeared in burlesque and striptease in the 1920s as a way to avoid breaking the law by performing topless or nude. Pasties came to be regarded by some as more aesthetic and erotic as they developed into a way of drawing attention to the breasts and nipples. They were worn in cabarets such as the Folies Bergère and Le Lido. Burlesque performer Carrie Finnell is attributed with adding tassels which hang from the center and incorporating tassel twirling as part of a performance. Finnell and Sally Rand rose to prominence as burlesque performers in the 1920s and 1930s. At that time there was a shift away from pasties decorated with tassels or gems toward nipple-like pasties, making the appearance of nudity more realistic. Skin-tone fabric was used, with a bead at the centre to represent the nipple. From the early 1930s burlesque performers typically wore pasties and a G-string, undressing to these as the final reveal of a striptease. The burlesque performer Gypsy Rose Lee included pasties as part of her onstage outfit in the 1930s and 1940s, and made adjusting them part of her act.

Dancers in US strip clubs continued to wear pasties in the 1950s and 1960s, with Carol Doda becoming the first fully topless public dancer in the country at the Condor Club in San Francisco in 1964. The use of pasties in burlesque and striptease declined during the subsequent decades, but they became fashionable again with the appearance of neo-burlesque in the 1990s and 2000s, worn by performers such as Jo Weldon and Dita Von Teese. The SuicideGirls, a troupe that started in 2001 as an homage to Bettie Page, included pasties in their live performances. Wearing pasties draws attention to and accentuates the nipples, pays tribute to burlesque performers of the past, and is also sometimes necessary to allow neo-burlesque dancers to perform in venues that are not licensed for toplessness under local ordinances.

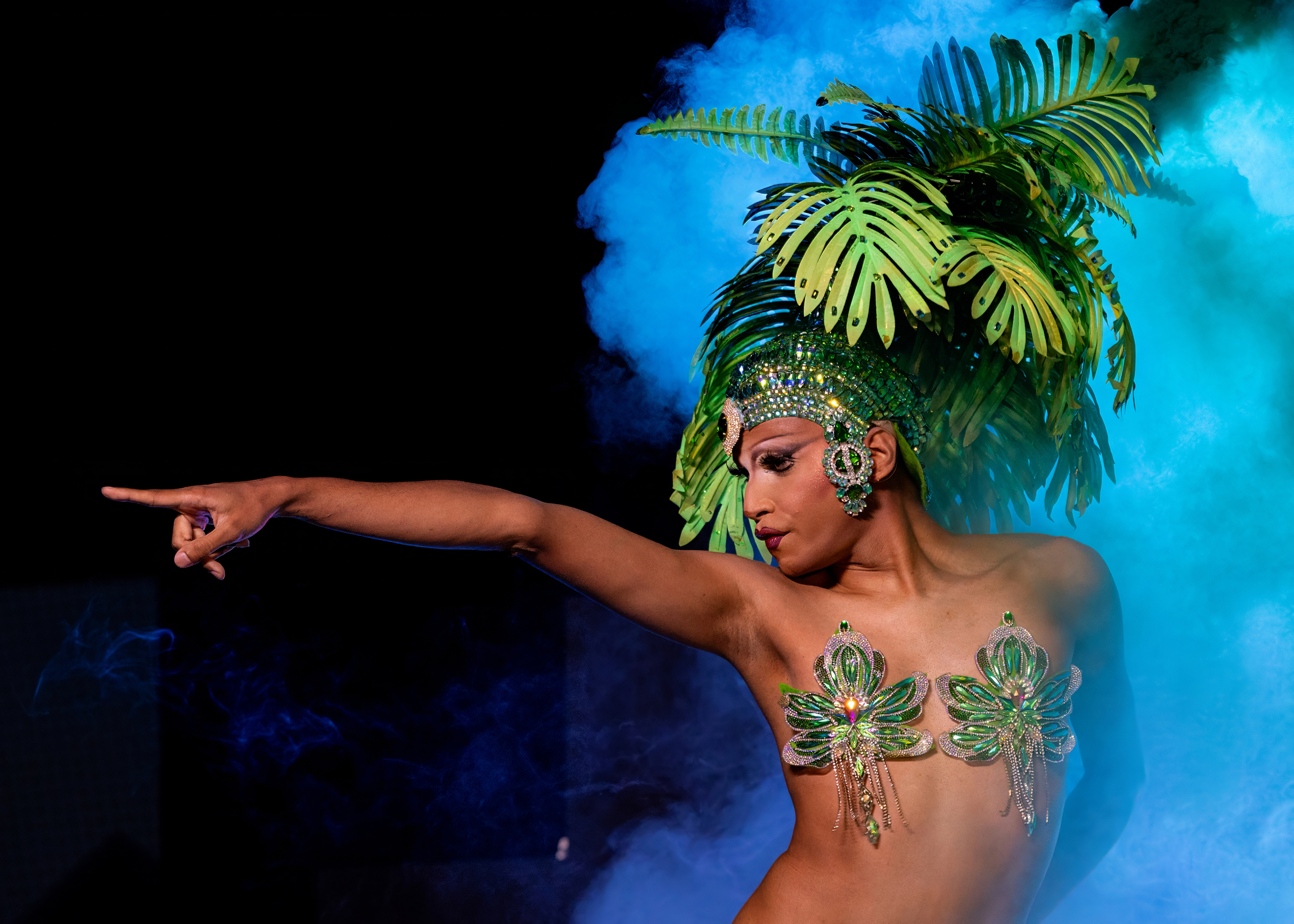
Drag queen Bombae wearing pasties during a performance

The punk rock singer Wendy O. Williams who performed during the 1970s and 1980s often wore electrical tape on stage to cover her nipples. In the 2010s the heavy metal band Butcher Babies briefly copied the look. In the 2014 short film Miley Cyrus: Tongue Tied the singer appears with her nipples concealed under black crosses made of nipple tape.

In the United States public indecency laws traditionally required bare-breasted dancers to wear pasties. These restrictions were relaxed in the mid 20th century but still apply in some parts of the country. In other parts new laws against nude dancing were introduced in the late 20th century, requiring dancers to wear pasties and a G-string. These laws have been subject to legal challenge on First Amendment grounds, arguing that nude dancing is a form of free speech. In Nevada, where public nudity is illegal, entertainers working on the Las Vegas Strip and Fremont Street wear pasties to remain within the law. Some strippers have alleged that lawmakers are engaging in cruelty by requiring use of adhesive material on the nipple. In some parts of the US transparent or liquid latex pasties are worn by strippers instead of conventional ones or electrical tape is used to cover the nipples. In 2013 a Texas judge prohibited the wearing of pasties by strippers, requiring instead that they wear more concealing bikini tops. In some parts of the country, such as New York State, alcohol laws require that performers in strip clubs must wear at least pasties and a G-string if liquor is served. Bare-breasted workers in Chicago's topless-only restaurants and strip clubs were legally required to wear pasties or other latex coverings on their breasts until Chicago City Council changed the city's liquor license statutes in 2020, removing references to gender.

Pasties are also worn at music festivals and raves, where they are worn alone or under tops that are low cut, open-fronted or made of sheer fabric. They often appear in decorative shapes and designs such as hearts, stars, flowers, aliens or mushrooms. They are also worn at pride parades, at fetish parties, and in night clubs.

Film actors who do not wish to be filmed nude often use body doubles or computer-generated imagery for nude scenes, but they sometimes wear pasties for screen roles to give the impression that they are nude. Pasties are also sometimes worn during auditions or interviews for nude scenes.

== Underwear ==
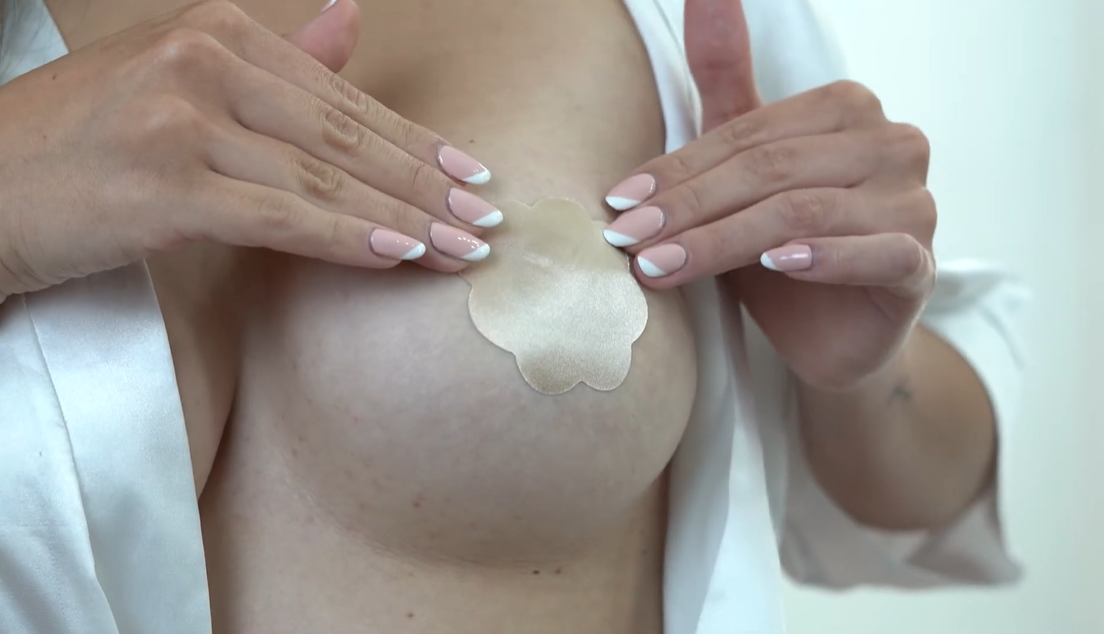
A woman using a silicone nipple cover as underwear.

Pasties are sometimes worn instead of a bra under clothes or under swimsuits to prevent the nipples from being seen through the fabric. Certain cultures have more concern than others about concealing the nipples in this way. In Japan, for instance, pasties (or nipple guards) are widely sold in general retailers such as grocery stores for this purpose. As an impromptu alternative to commercially produced pasties, two crossed strips of adhesive tape can be used to cover each nipple. Using pasties in this way can be practical when wearing wrap tops, sports bras, crop tops, garments with low-cut necklines, strapless or backless dresses, or dresses with cutout side panels. The use of nipple pasties as an alternative to bras has become common in contemporary fashion. It can prevent the nipples and areolae being visible through the sheer fabric of see-through clothing or lingerie, and it can hide naturally protruding nipples or a nipple erection. It can also help to protect the nipples if the breasts feel heavy and sore during pregnancy.

Lift pasties include an additional tab that can be attached above the breast to lift it and hence change its appearance under clothing.

== Beachwear ==
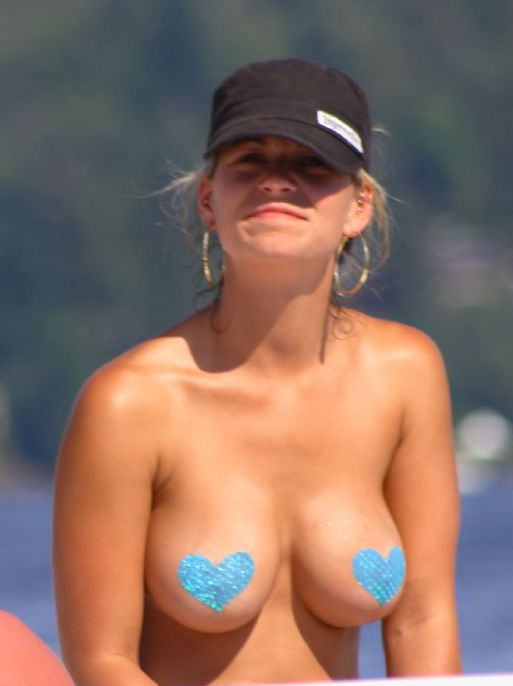
Pasties worn as beachwear (2007)

In the 1960s, fashion designers created the trikini, a bikini variant consisting of pasties and briefs . Pasties are occasionally worn on beaches to maximize a sun tan by avoiding the strap lines produced by bikinis, without the need for toplessness. Waterproof pasties can also hide protruding nipples under swimwear.

== Fashion ==
During the twentieth century pasties were primarily associated with strippers, but during the twenty-first century they have become popular with celebrities such as musicians and pop stars. They are now worn as fashion accessories and have been appearing in fashion shows since 2016. As part of the fashion trend called underwear as outerwear they are sometimes worn as a visible part of an outfit, typically in metallic colours rather than flesh tones. In this way they have been incorporated into fashion collections by designers such as Tom Ford and Anthony Vaccarello and brands such as Yves Saint Laurent. Pasties have been worn in this way by the model and actor Cara Delevingne, the model Bella Hadid, and the pop star Doja Cat. Other celebrities that have worn them include Miley Cyrus, Nicki Minaj, Janet Jackson, Rihanna, Lady Gaga, Cher, Britney Spears, Lil' Kim and Kendall Jenner.

== Athletes ==
Runners, surfers, and other outdoor athletes may experience fissure of the nipple, a chafing irritation caused by friction with clothing such as a T-shirt. The condition is colloquially known as "runner's nipple". Some people wear pasties to cover the nipple and avoid or mitigate the irritation. When worn under clothing, pasties are sometimes called breast petals, nipple covers or nipple guards.

== Gallery ==
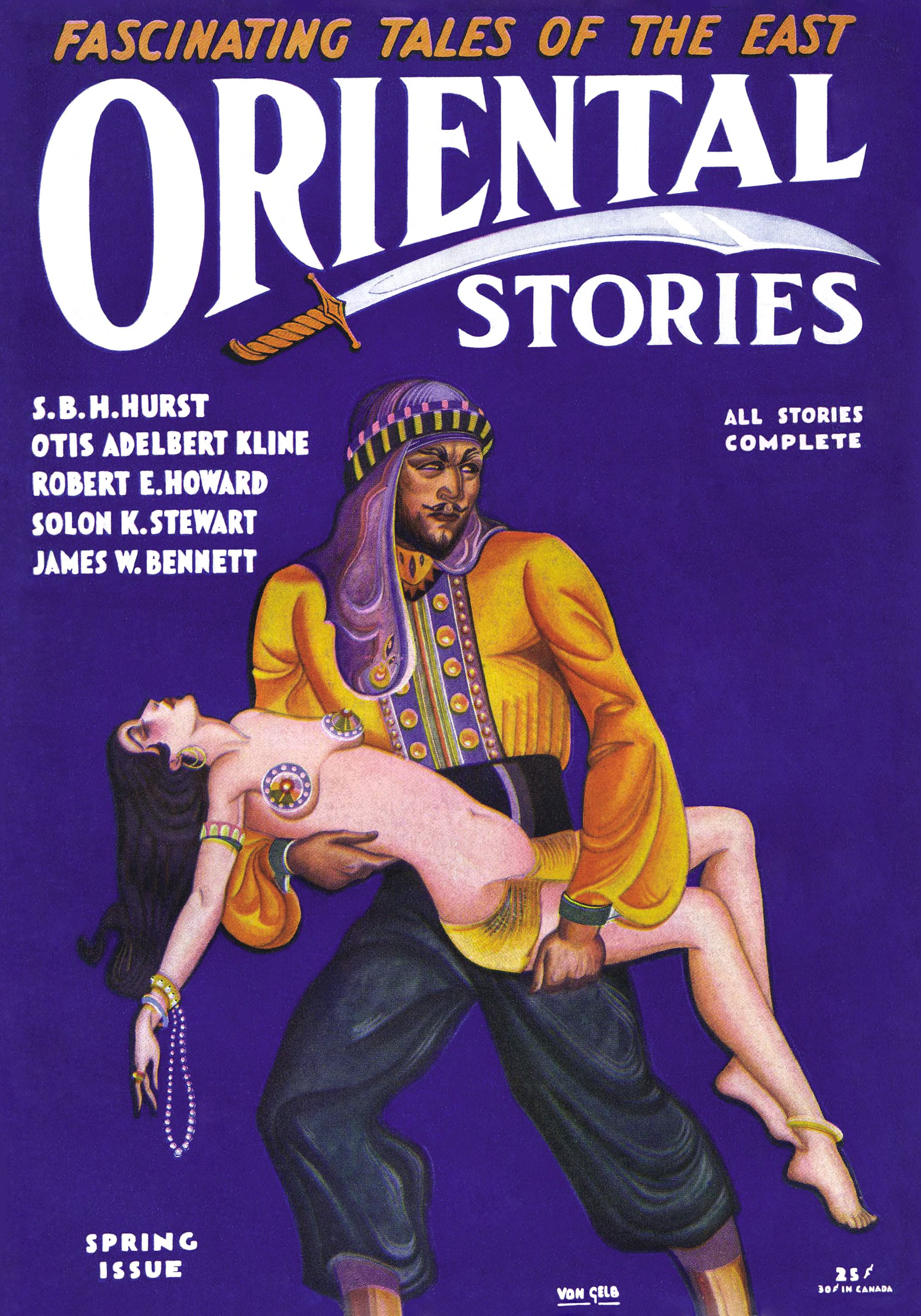
Oriental Stories (1931)

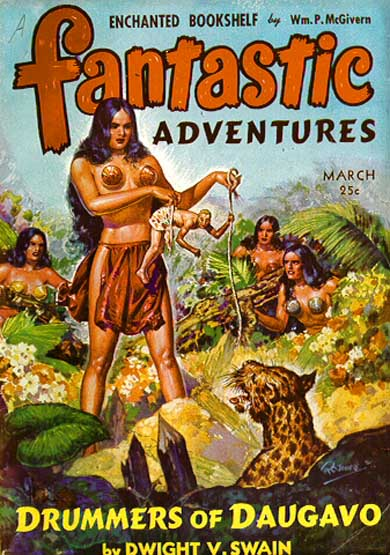
Fantastic Adventures (1943)

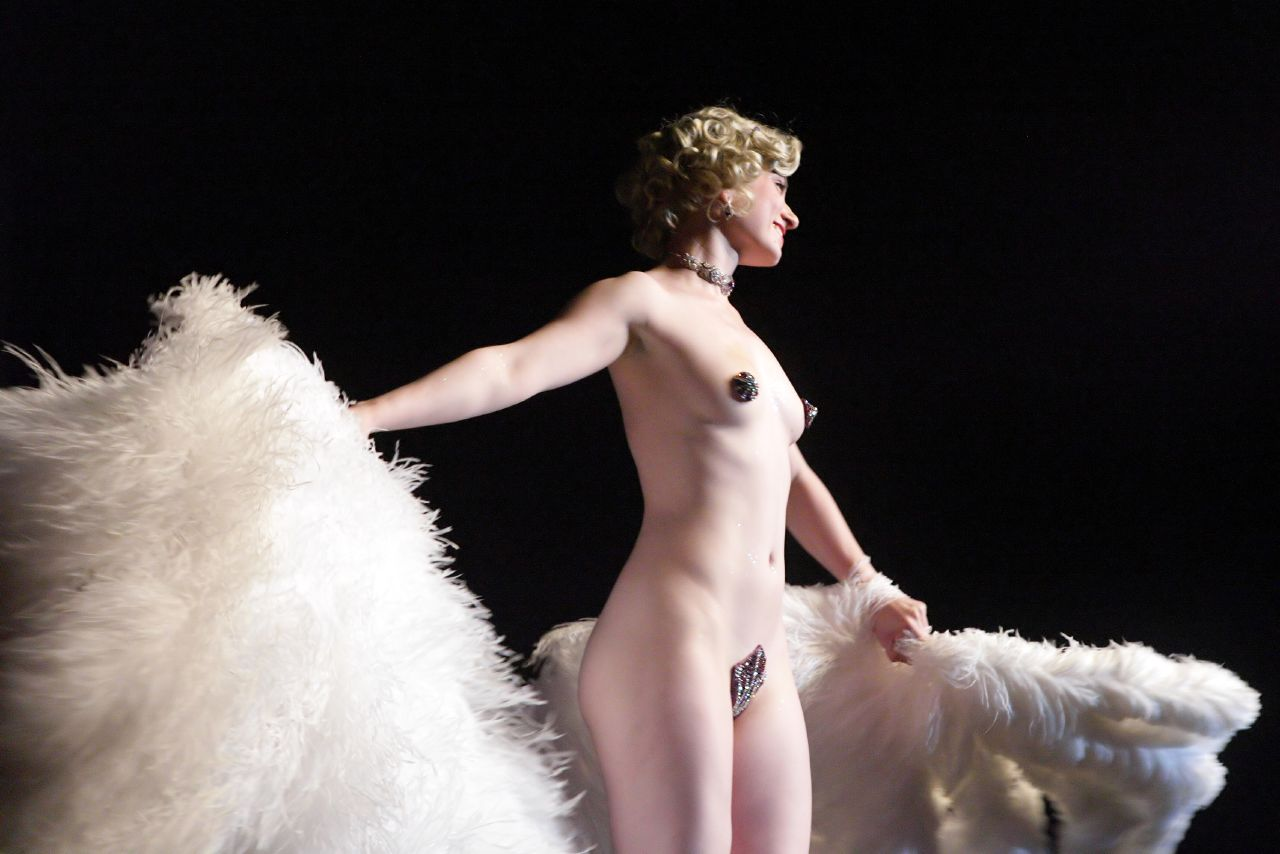
Neo-burlesque performer Michelle L'amour performing a fan dance wearing pasties and a C-string (2007)

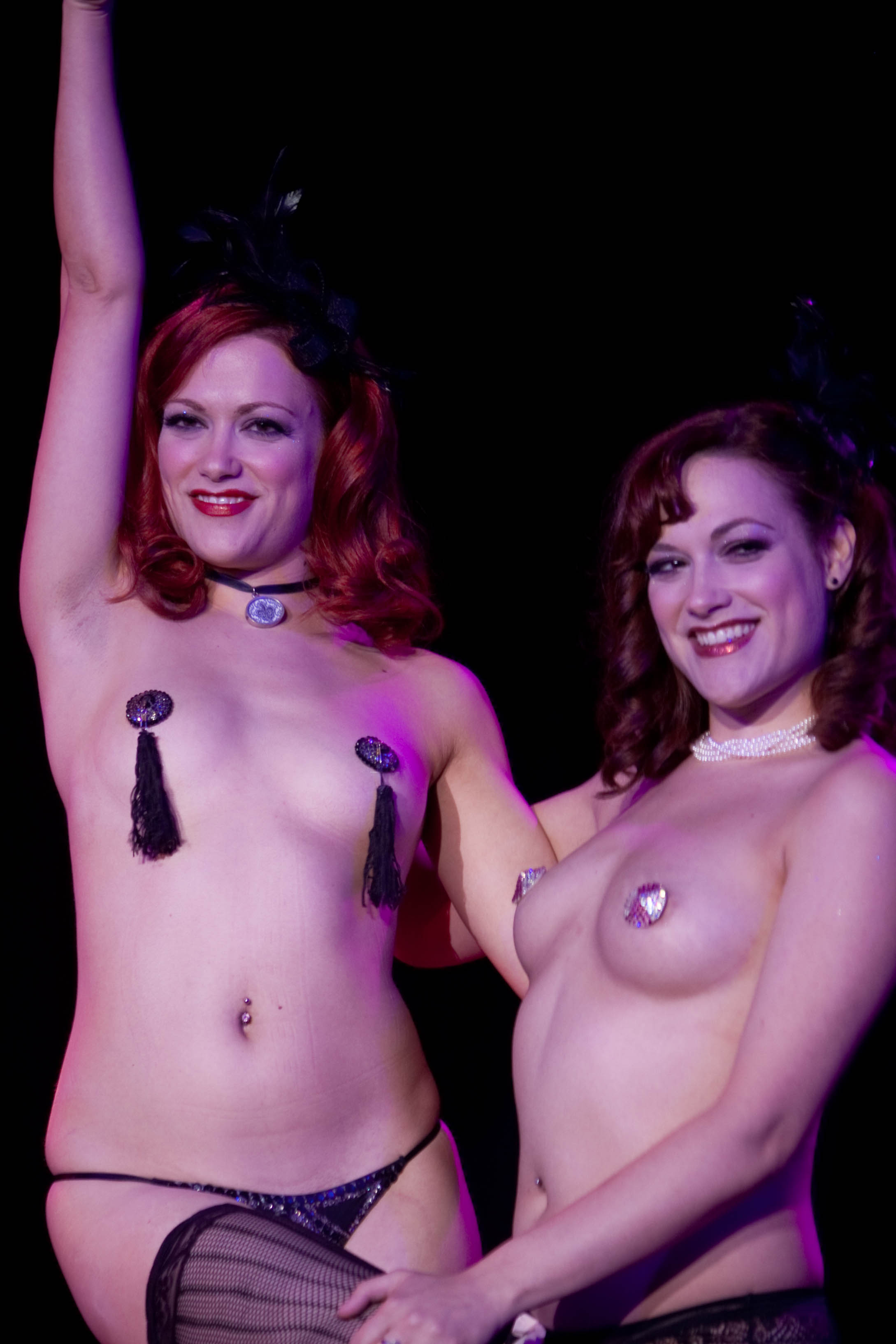
Neo-Burlesque dancers wearing pasties, New Orleans (2010)

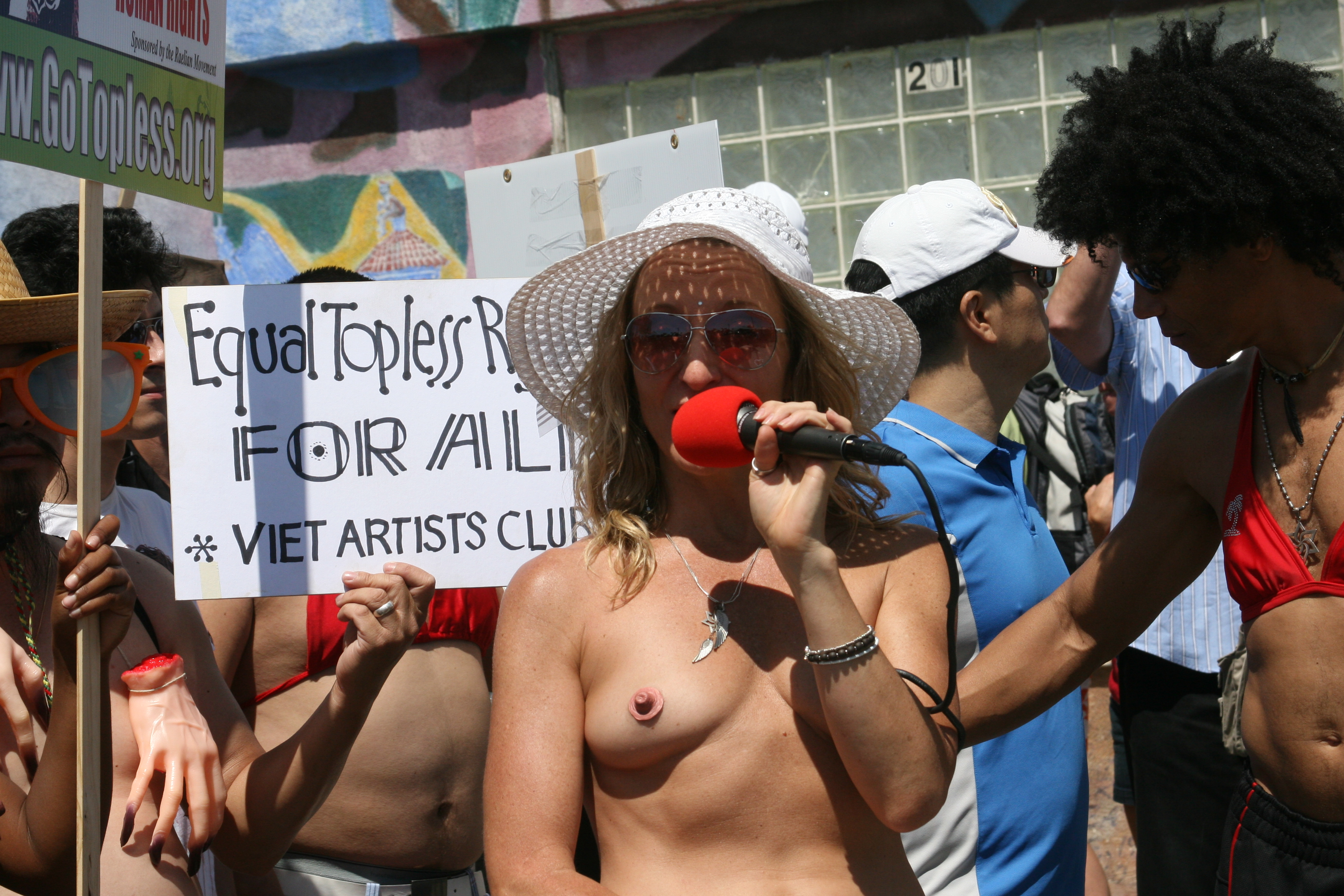
A demonstrator protesting for equal rights for women, wearing a pastie in the form of a nipple (2011)

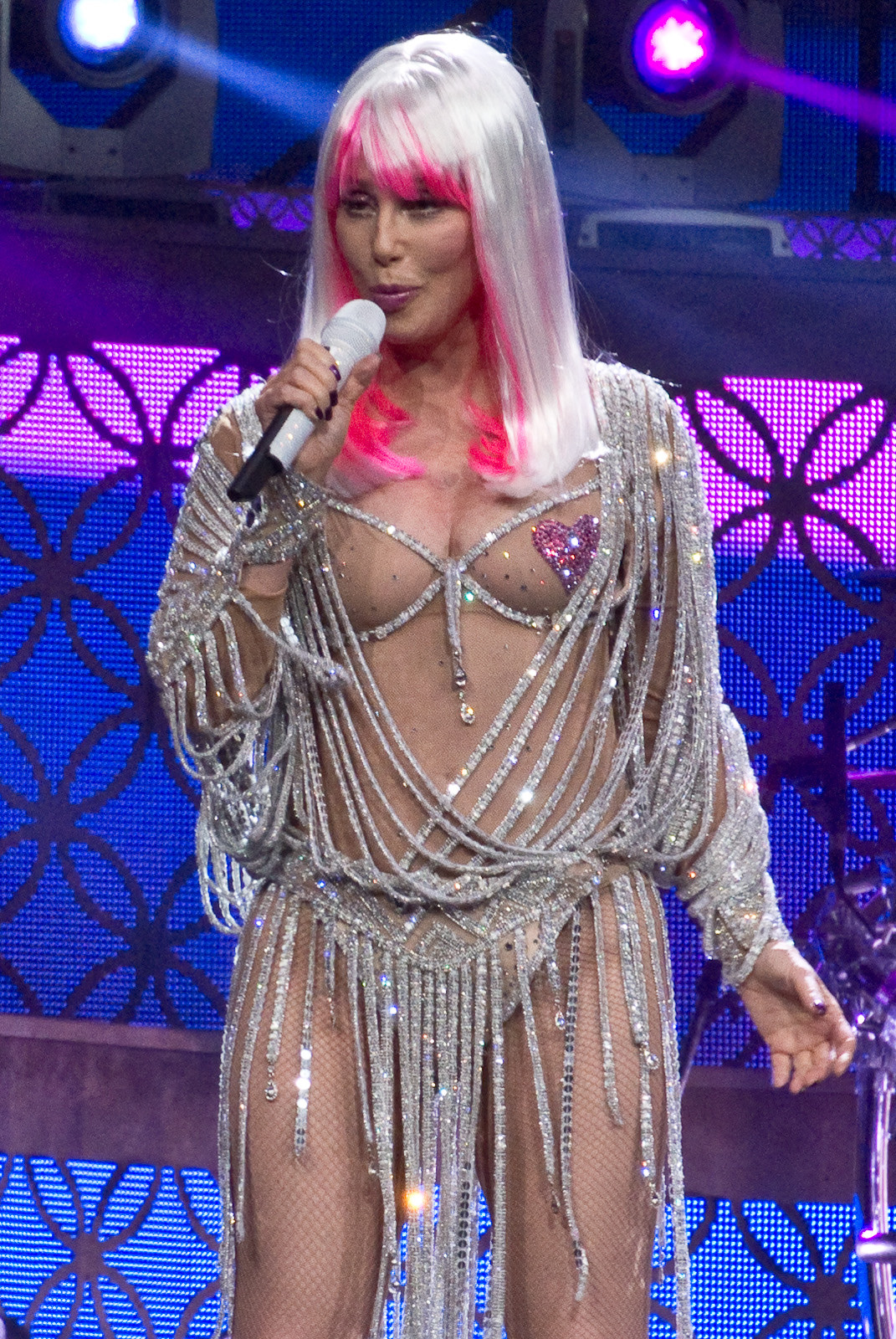
American singer-actress Cher wearing heart-shaped pasties during a concert (2014)

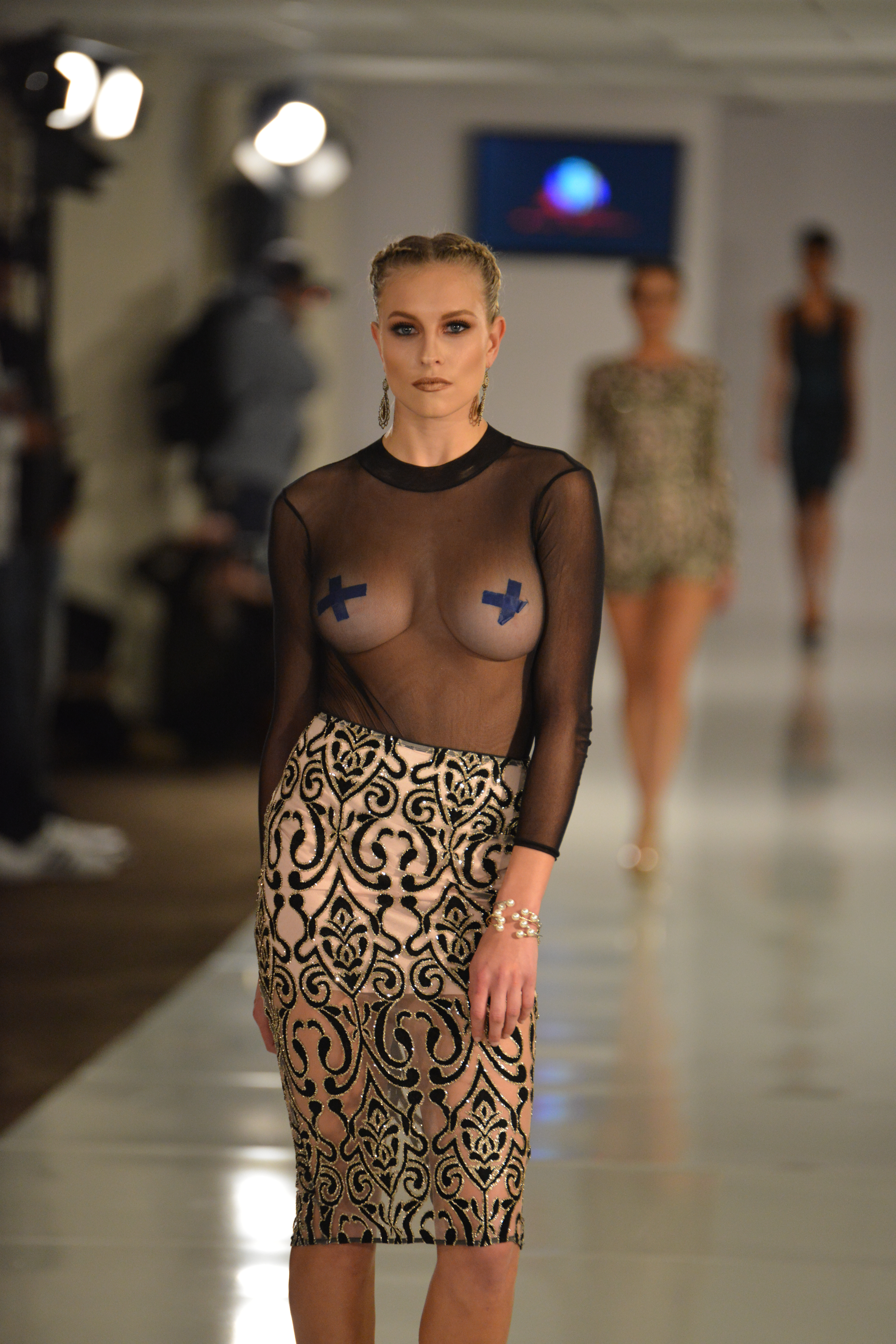
A see-through top worn along with tape being used as pasties by a model at a fashion show in the US (2017)

== See also ==
- List of bra designs
- Merkin
- Topfreedom
- Vajazzle
