= Trikini =

Three-piece garment used as beachwear

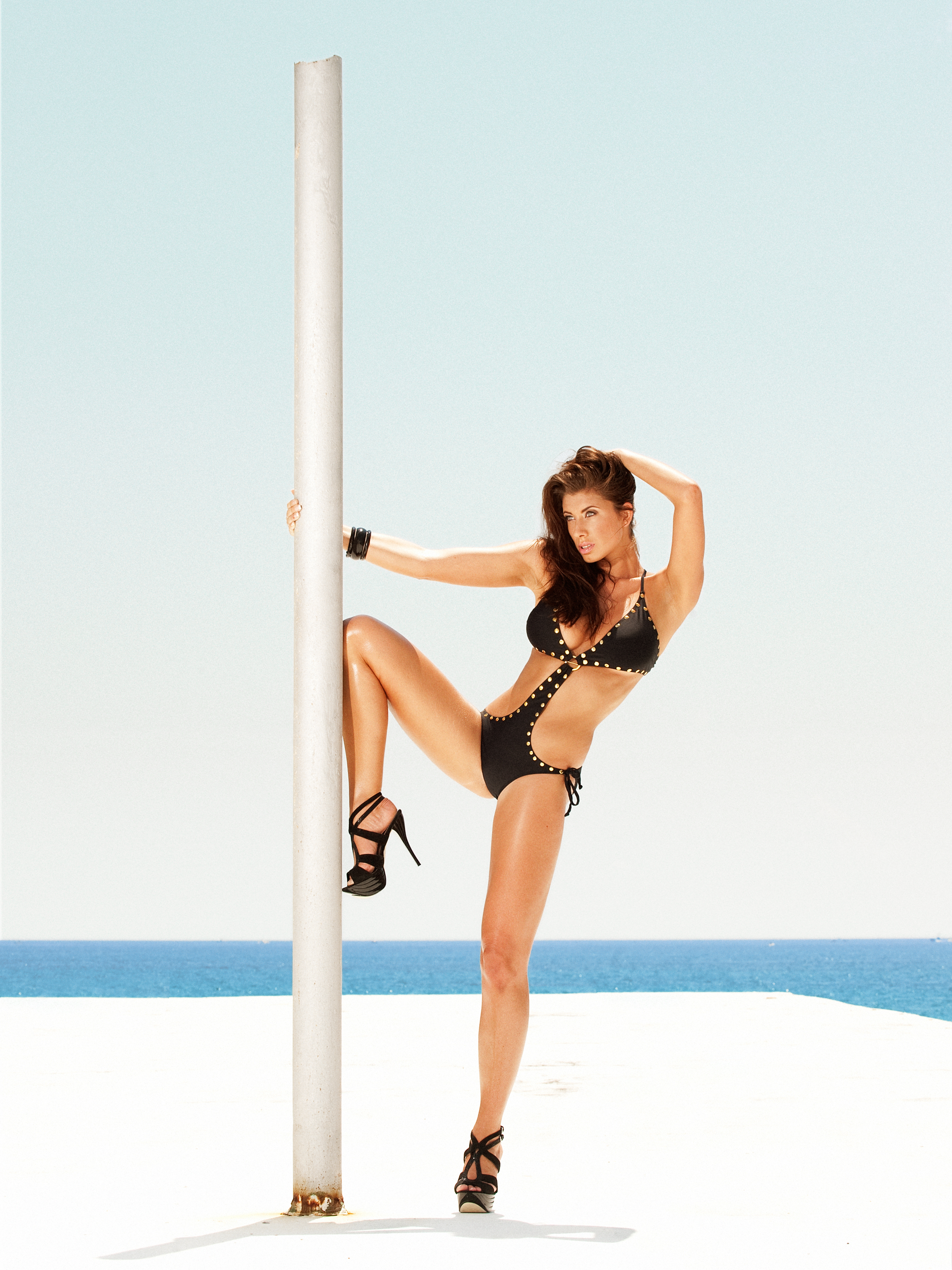
Maria Eriksson in a Trikini in Miami, Florida

A trikini is a three-piece garment used as beachwear. The name is formed from bikini, (itself named for Bikini Atoll) replacing "bi-", as if to mean "two", with "tri-", meaning "three". Some different interpretations of this bikini variant have appeared over the years.

In the 1960s, fashion designers combined pasties and briefs to create the first trikini. It appeared briefly in 1967, described as "a handkerchief and two small saucers." In the early 2000s the term trikini was revived for the string bikini – a bikini bottom combined with a stringed halterneck bikini top that has two triangular pieces of cloth to cover the breasts. This style of trikini was used by Dolce & Gabbana in their 2005 Milan show, in a design where "the three pieces of scintillating sequined fabric, barely cover the essentials".

In some cases the term trikini is used for a set of three items of clothing sold together, such as a bikini with a tank top or a bikini with a one-piece swimsuit. For their 2007 Milan show Dolce & Gabbana presented a trikini consisting of a conventional two-piece bikini with a band of rhinestones around the waist.

In 2004 the Brazilian fashion designer Amir Slama created a trikini consisting of two small pieces of silk, each functioning as a cup and a sash, which were connected with a string. In 2008 the Israeli fashion designer Gideon Oberson created a two-piece bathing suit which he described as a trikini. It combined a pair of conventional bikini bottoms with a bathing top that had bra cups and waist elastic and resembled a tank top. The intention was that it could be worn on its own on the beach or combined with a skirt or a pair of shorts in other locations.

In 2020, as a response to the impact of the COVID-19 pandemic on the fashion industry, a variety of trikini was created by Italian fashion designer Tiziana Scaramuzzo, consisting of a conventional two-piece bikini with a matching face mask.
