= Impact of the COVID-19 pandemic on the fashion industry =

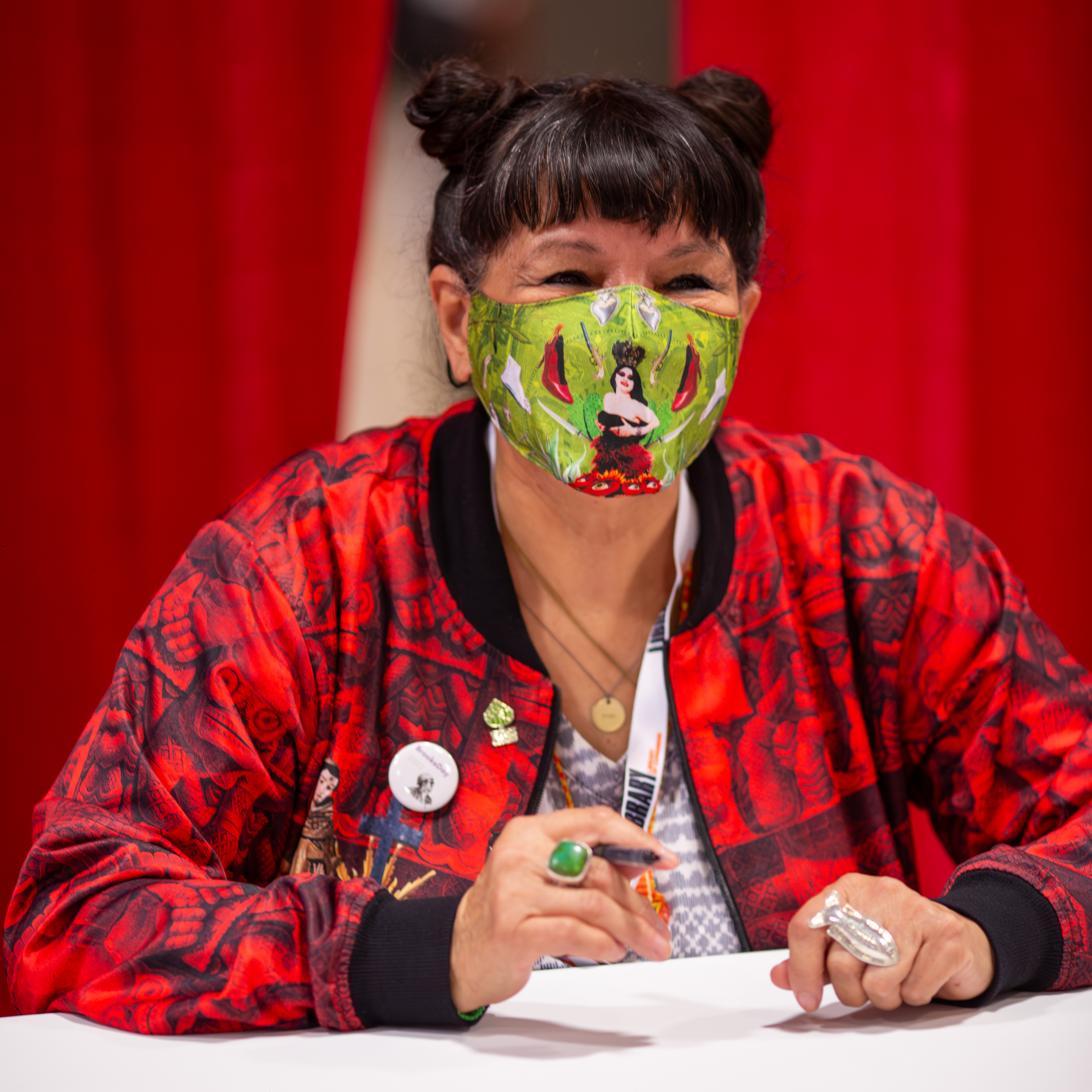
Sandra Cisneros wearing a face mask at the National Book Festival (2024)

The impact of the COVID-19 pandemic on the fashion industry was primarily caused by the sudden and global store closures worldwide which strongly impacted the fashion industry. The complete absence of revenue from physical stores caused a deep drop of revenue for fashion retailers, a complete reconfiguration of the stocks for fashion brands, and consequently a drop of orders for garment manufacturers. Many fashion retailers filed for bankruptcy in the aftermath of the pandemic.

Almost overnight, fashion brands became 100% reliant upon digital solutions for sales. Fashion events were cancelled, pushing fashion brands to design novel ways to present their new collections. The lock-down created new fashion trends based on home comfort and hygiene.

== Presentation ==
In the first months following the start of the global lock-down, the fashion sector was shaken by the sudden stop of all retail stores sales worldwide. The supply chain froze for a few weeks in some countries, which materialized by a lack of fabric availability and order cancellations. Many fashion designers saw the pandemic as a catalyst for change, a way to break away from the industry's constraints. Most fashion companies focused on innovation with online sales to maintain revenue afloat.

Domenico de Sole, chairman of Tom Ford International, remarked that "I have seen a lot of difficult situations in my long career and this has been the most devastating event, not just for fashion and luxury, but all industries."

== Sales and marketing ==
In early April 2020, Forrester published a report predicting a $2.1 trillion loss in sales for the global retail industry in 2020. With store closures, some fashion companies had their spring sales fell by 60%. A mid-April report by the Census Bureau estimated the decline of retail sales to -8,7% in March 2020, with clothing sales falling hard with a 50.5% sales drop. The New York Times found the data comparable to those of the months following the 2008 financial crisis, even though stores remained opened that time. Department stores, which were already losing the competition to online sales, all announced a major crisis to come, being unable to compensate their losses with online sales. In April 2020, clothing sales fell 79% in the USA. Malaysian fashion designers were hardly hit too. The industry recorded a 9.6% global decline in 2020.

The economic crisis hit the larger department stores first: J.Crew, Neiman Marcus, Brooks Brothers and JCPenney all filed for bankruptcy within the months following the coronavirus outbreak. On the other end, the outbreak was also the start of booming online sales for some smaller, low-overhead clothing companies that foster a close relationship with their customers.

As retail stores shut their doors and stay-at-home orders kept people inside, there was a dramatic shift towards digital commerce that is likely to continue post-pandemic. Consumers had to increase their use of services like social commerce and curbside pickup and retailers had to offer digital solutions in order to survive. Sales from physical brick-and-mortar stores and department stores are down and expected to continue decreasing while direct-to-consumer online retailers are on the rise. Some dressmakers and seamstresses have shifted to making masks, including specialized masks for Sikhs and wearers of turbans, hijabs, and hearing aids, as well as those with full beards. According to Shashin Shah of TotalRetail, the industry's new challenge is to deliver "contactless yet engaging customer experiences."

The lockdown led to a surge of new TikTok users, with 2 million app downloads during the week of March 16, 2020 (1.7 million the prior week), but its gross revenue grew by 34% that same week. According to Isabel Slone, TikTok rewards people for "retreating into their own niches and discovering new interests".

According to the Harvard Business Review (2021), the covid crisis led to a great decline in traditional advertising spending, and a historic ROI from social media, leading fashion companies and brands to boost their online and digital presence. About 61% of CMOs indicated that they have "shifted resources to building customer-facing digital interfaces" and 56.2% are planning to "transform their go-to-market business models to focus on digital opportunities".

== Manufacturing ==
According to Bloomberg, Bangladesh was severely hit by the sudden halt of production. In many countries, financial programs were launched to support suddenly jobless workers of the fashion industry. "The global trade union which works to give workers around the world a voice, says that millions of garment makers have already lost their jobs as a result of the virus and have no access to social or financial safety nets to help them weather this storm. This has affected many fashion brands directly, as they face challenges by no longer having their manufacturers to rely on. Brands typically pay their suppliers weeks or even months after delivery, rather than upon order.

Suppliers, though, need to pay upfront the cost of materials and fibers used to make the products they have been asked to produce from brands. The issue is that with the unfolding situation of the pandemic, fashion brands and retailers are cancelling orders, due to low demands of clothing, and cancelling payments for orders that have already been placed with their manufacturers. Hence, fashion brands take no responsibility for the impact this has on the people working under their supply chains; their manufacturers who have already worked on crafting their products at their own cost and no longer receive anything in return. Given the situation, factories are left with no other choice than to keep hold of unwanted goods already made or destroy them, and laying off workers to afford the crisis or shutting down their factories indefinitely.

== Events ==
Designers have adapted with producing and showcasing their fashion products by streaming presentations online without a live audience present. The British Fashion Council made an announcement in April 2020 that it would develop a digital "cultural fashion week platform" that designers could use in any way that they thought would work for them rather than facilitating the typical format and setting of a fashion show. Shanghai and Moscow fashion weeks were presented digitally in late March and April 2020. Ermenegildo Zegna coined the word phygital to describe "physical space and digital technologies" as its new way of showcasing fashion.

As art galleries and museums were closed, First American Art Magazine organized a virtual art exhibition and asked the Native art community to submit masks. More than seventy artists handed in 125 masks, from functional masks to decorated ones.

== Fashion trends ==
=== Covid-inspired styles ===
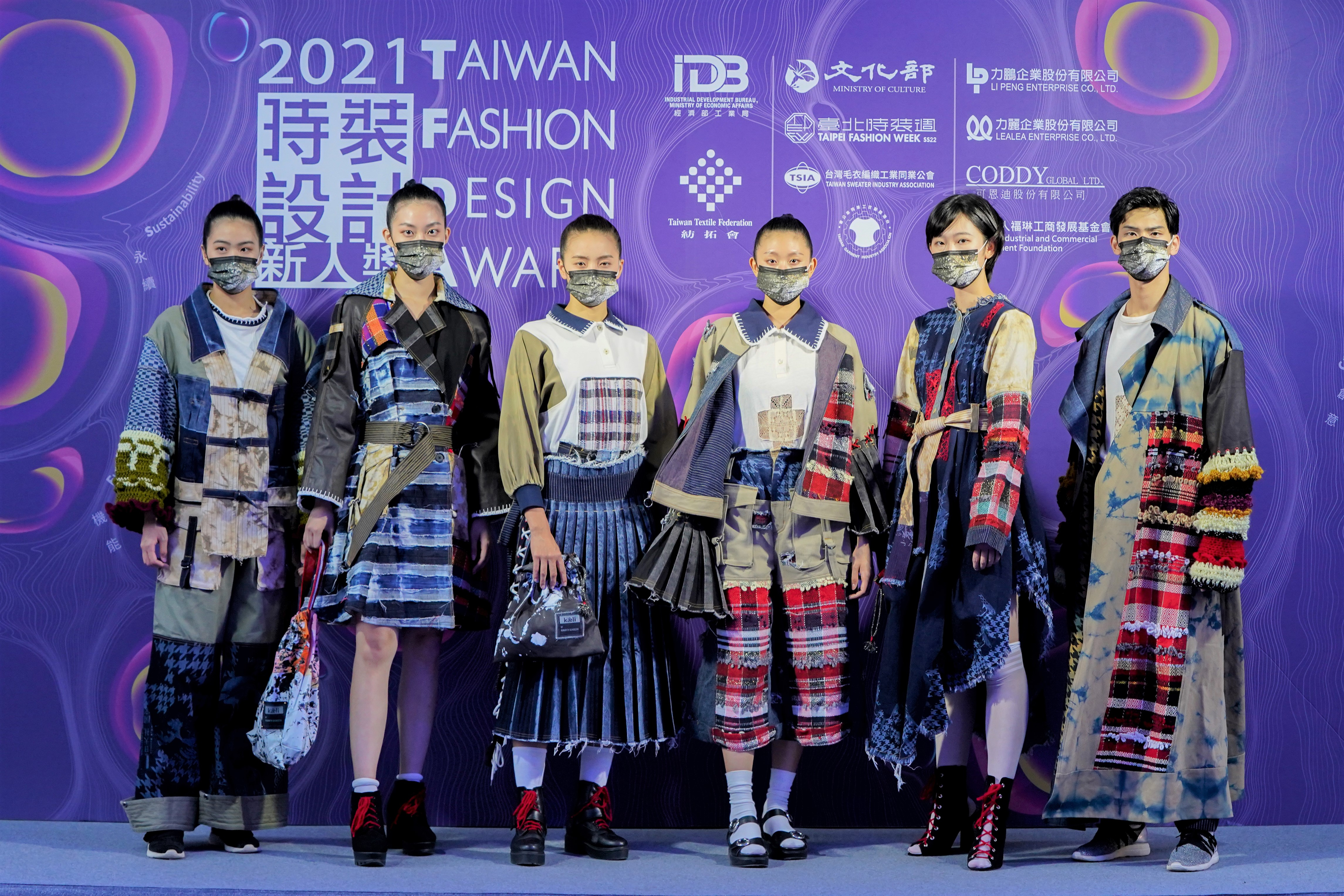
Face masks integrated into a 2021 fashion show outfit.

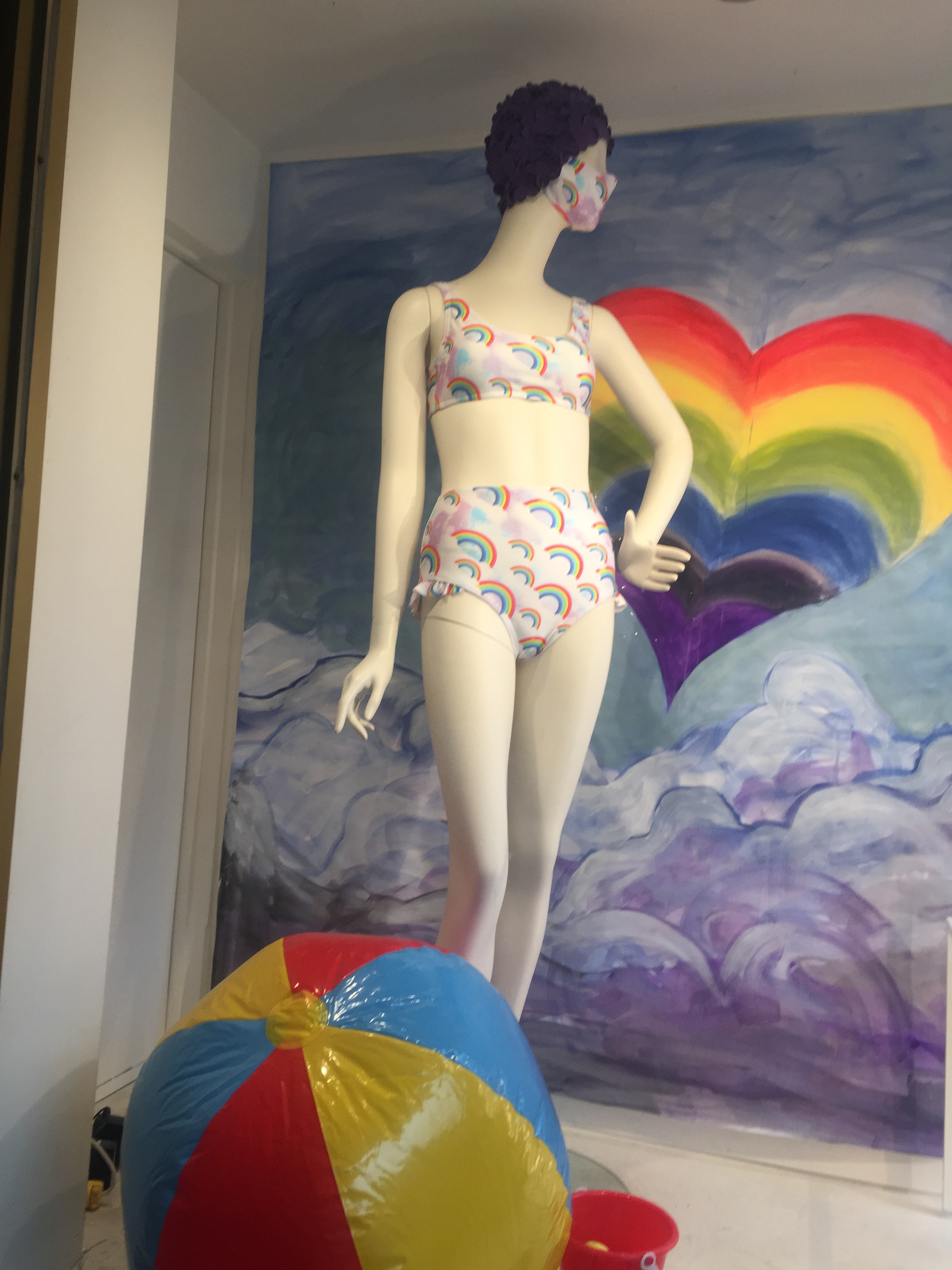
Trikini

Face masks are a "piece of clothing ... that began as purely protective transforming into a fashion statement in no time at all." The trikini in Italy, for example, consists of two piece beachwear and a matching mask. More broadly they have appeared on the catwalk as a part of the haute couture's industry turn towards a utilitarian flair, and furthermore with the global rollout of effective vaccines thought is now being given to "the post-COVID look".

=== Leisurewear ===
Sales of casualwear and sleepwear, to adapt to the lockdown lifestyle, boomed. The demand for tracksuits, pajamas, hoodies, sportswear, and other leisurewear highly rose. Baggy jeans, for example, replaced tight ones in top sales. Sweatpants sales grew 80% in 2020 in the USA alone.

Those changes in tastes led businesses to pivot their focus towards home-worn clothes, athleisure, loungewear and onesies. A post-pandemic challenge also brought a greater focus on hygiene and safety.

One report based on a US survey showed that 79% said they dress differently since the lock-down. The term "casualization" was used to describe this trend that had been observed before the sanitary crisis, but accelerated after the lock-down.

=== Enhanced sustainability ===
The fashion industry is one of the world's largest polluting industries. With the spread of the COVID-19 pandemic, the industry has faced a stage of reassessment and a quest for new ecological alternatives. Large retailers were already facing the decline of in-store sales and could not risk additional significant sustainability-oriented investments. Numerous reports and studies have shown how the COVID-19 pandemic highly motivated consumers to create a better, healthier planet. Consumer fashion purchasing behavior has evolved and people are leaning towards more environmentally-friendly, sustainable, and/or ethical purchases.

LVMH launched the deadstock resale platform Nona Source to boost the industry's circularity.

The pandemic propelled an already existing surge for secondhand luxury fashion, with websites such as The RealReal, ThredUp, or Poshmark, seeing a surge of activity during the pandemic. In March 2021, the luxury group Kering acquired 5% of the secondhand resale platform Vestiaire Collective. In early 2024, the Gucci Vault (marketplace of exclusive collaborations and It products) was replaced by Gucci Vintage (reconditioned secondhand clothes).

== See also ==
- 2020s in fashion
- Social impact of the COVID-19 pandemic
- Impact of the COVID-19 pandemic on retail
