= If This Be Treason =

1948 book by Ezra Pound

- Original booklet
- Author: Olga Rudge
- Publication date: 1948
- Media type: Booklet
- Pages: 33
- OCLC: 318182831

If This Be Treason ... is a 33-page booklet published privately in Italy in early 1948 by Olga Rudge, mistress of the American poet Ezra Pound. Pound, who lived in Italy with his wife from 1924 to 1945, was indicted in absentia for treason in 1943 by the United States District Court for the District of Columbia after he made hundreds of radio broadcasts, pro-Axis and deeply antisemitic, on behalf of Fascist Italy during World War II and the Holocaust in Italy. The title phrase had previously been used in a speech by Patrick Henry in 1765.

The booklet, 300 copies of which were printed, contains six of Pound's cultural broadcasts: "e. e. cummings," "e. e. cummings/examind", "James Joyce: to his memory", "A french accent", "Canto 45", and "Blast." It was the first time any of Pound's broadcasts had been published. The publication was an attempt by Rudge to exonerate Pound of the charges.

Pound continued to broadcast for the fascists until he was arrested by American forces in Italy in May 1945. He spent 13 years in custody, including over 12 years in St. Elizabeth's psychiatric hospital in Washington, D.C. When he was released in May 1958, he returned to live in Italy, where he died and was buried in 1972.

== Publication details ==
- Pound, Ezra (1948). If This Be Treason .... Edited by and printed for Olga Rudge. Siena: Tip. Nuova. OCLC 318182831 Venice: Tip Litographia Armena, 1983. OCLC 20649673
