= Carrie Finnell =

American burlesque dancer and comic entertainer (1899 – 1963)

- Born: Carrie Lee Finnell; November 14, 1899; Covington, Kentucky, U.S.
- Died: November 14, 1963 (aged 64); Fayetteville, Ohio, U.S.
- Occupation: Burlesque dancer

Carrie Lee Finnell (November 14, 1899 – November 14, 1963) was an American burlesque dancer and comic entertainer.

== Biography ==
She was born in Covington, Kentucky, and during her teen years was active in local sports and training for national competitions. She also took to the stage as a member of the Le Roy Musical Comedy Company and the Guy Players. As a dancer able to produce high kicks and precise turns, she soon joined a national touring company, and became known as "Minneapolis's Sweetheart". At one point, her legs were insured for $100,000 by manager Noah Schechter as a publicity stunt. Billed as "The Girl with $100,000 Legs", she traveled the country and performed at the Minsky brothers' National Winter Garden theatre in New York. She won further acclaim at an event in Cincinnati, when a fire broke out in the theatre but she continued performing, helping to ensure that the audience did not panic. The show was witnessed by Florenz Ziegfeld, who gave her a place as a chorus girl in the Ziegfeld Follies.

By 1923, she started performing as a solo burlesque dancer, performing an early form of striptease. Though ballyhoo tells of a striptease engagement in Cleveland extending over 54 weeks (in which, the legend says, she removed an item of clothing every week to increased customer demand and ticket prices, and also added tassels from a can-can costume to her pasties, and twirled them round as part of her dance), contemporary sources report the engagement ending after 20 weeks, though she returns in October of the same year for a shorter run.

Finnell developed techniques using her muscles to make her nipple tassels dance, at different speeds and in opposite directions, a technique adopted by later performers. Her obituary said that "the accent was on comedy, not on smut". Fellow burlesque performer Ann Corio said of Finnell: "Faster and faster it [the first tassel] would spin while its fellow tassel lay limp and neglected on the other bosom. Then the other tassel would come to life. It would start spinning slowly, while the first tassel was at full speed. Carrie looked like a twin engine bomber. She would walk across the stage with the tassels swirling in front of her and applause would ring out." Her act was "hilarious and spectacular", and unashamedly featured her voluptuous body shape. She danced rhythmically and provocatively, adding humor to her performances. She was billed as "The Bad Girl of Burlesque", "The Mammary Manipulator", and "The Most Novel And Most Startling Act In Show Business", and was at one time the highest paid burlesque artist in the world.

She met and married Chicago theatre owner Charles Grow, and settled in Independence, Kentucky, where they set up a nightclub. They were subject to several court cases over illegal slot machines and gambling. The couple had a son, but divorced in the early 1930s. Fennell returned to performing, and moved with her second husband to New York City. In the 1950s, she gave up performing apart from occasional television and nightclub appearances, the last one two weeks before her death.

She died in Fayetteville, Ohio, in 1963 at the age of 64 (though contemporary obituaries gave her age as 70).

Finnell was married twice: in the 1920s to Charles Grow, with whom she had a son in 1925; and from 1936 to Thomas Morris, until his death three weeks before her own.
