= There's a Picture in My Old Kit Bag =

1918 song by Al Sweet

Song
- Language: English
- Published: 1918
- Songwriter(s): Al Sweet

"There's a Picture in My Old Kit Bag" is a World War I song written and composed by Al Sweet. This song was first published in 1918 by Ted Browne Music Co., in Chicago, Illinois. The sheet music cover depicts a soldier in a trench looking at a picture.

The sheet music can be found at the Pritzker Military Museum & Library.

== Bibliography ==
- Parker, Bernard S. (2007). World War I Sheet Music. Vol. 2. Jefferson: McFarland & Company, Inc. ISBN 978-0-7864-2799-4. OCLC 71790113.
- Vogel, Frederick G. (1995). World War I Songs: A History and Dictionary of Popular American Patriotic Tunes, with Over 300 Complete Lyrics. Jefferson: McFarland & Company, Inc. ISBN 0-89950-952-5. OCLC 32241433.
