= The Six Rockets =

The Six Rockets was a German, all-girl, acrobat troupe that enjoyed a run of success touring variety circuits, largely in the United States, ostensibly between 1905 and 1933. When not on the road, the troupe was managed out of Leipzig by local impresario Oswald Büttner.

== Early history (1908–1911) ==
Throughout its incarnations the sextet were a dancing, singing and musical act of girls whose first tour of the US occurred in 1908. That run lasted three theatrical seasons (typically 40 weeks – a year less two summer months) and until 1911 whilst they toured the Eastern Burlesque Wheel.

== Second incarnation (1923–1927) ==
In the summer of 1923, Büttner returned to the US at the behest of American impresarios, 'Johnson & Lowenstein, Inc'. with The Six Rockets and a new set of personnel. The troupe, whose members included Nannÿ Tÿralla, Annedore Frenkel, and Melanie Elisabeth Geidel (all previously living in Leipzig), Erna Prokop of Breslau (today Wroclaw) and Elisabeth Huebner and Gertrud Tafel (both from Dresden), arrived in New York on August 8, 1923. Oswald Büttner was accompanied by his 23-year-old son, Arno Büttner.

The rockets spent two seasons touring the Columbia Burlesque circuit before briefly joining the Pantages Circuit. They subsequently get a break on the Keith Albee Circuit, the forerunner to Keith-Albee-Orpheum, touring until 1927.

During Christmas week, 1925, the rockets perform at the B. F. Keith's Hippodrome in Manhattan, New York. The programme was described by Variety as a: "Circusy show at the Hip this week, okay for the kiddies and obviously framed for their particular education". The Rockets, advertised as "The Speediest European Acrobatic Novelty Girl Act", opened the show and were given the thumbs up as "a sturdy female sextet, doing aero, ground tumbling, pyramid building and strong man stuff in keeping with the pace established by their masculine contemporaries". The engagement was followed by performances at the Palace theatre on Broadway in Manhattan from January 4, 1926.

In between their circuit commitments, the troupe fulfilled engagements on Marcus Loew's Circuit as well as the so-called 'Amalgamated Circuit', which saw them perform at summer county fairs too, largely in New York State. The troupe largely tour the US East Coast and its Midwest.

On 31 May 1927, The Six Rockets' members returned to Germany "in order to enjoy a well-deserved two months break". A substitute sextet continue to complete a series of engagements between August and October 1927, which includes performing at the Ambassador Theatre in St. Louis, Missouri, from October 26, 1927. The shows were managed by Oswald Büttner's accompanying son, Arno Büttner, who remained behind in the US.

== Third incarnation (1927–1931) ==
Following the rockets' return to Germany, a change of personnel saw only Nanny Tyralla remain while she was joined by her sister, Margot Tyralla, Helena Seifert and Ilse Wassman of Breslau, Margarethe Bathon from Coblense (Koblenz) and Rosa Heidrich of Küstrin (today Kostrzyn nad Odrą, in Poland). Performances were undertaken between November 1927 and February 1928 in Leipzig at the Krystall-Palast-Theater, Hamburg at the Flora Variete theatre and in Breslau at its Liebich Theater. From March, 1928, The Six Rockets toured the United Kingdom's music halls, performing in Plymouth, London, Birmingham, Reading, Glasgow, Manchester, before rounding off their UK visit with a run at the London Palladium during the week beginning 28 May 1928, alongside ‘The Greatest Living Comedienne,' Sophie Tucker.

The Six Rockets returned to the United States on July 15, 1928 performing for Radio-Keith-Orpheum. The troupe returned to New York City's Palace theatre in March 1929 and followed this with an engagement at its Empire Theatre on March 15th. Later that month they played the 'RKO' Keith's Theater in Lowell, Massachusetts.

Between August 24th-31st the troupe performed beyond the US border and outdoors at the Nova Scotia Provincial Exhibition in, Halifax, Canada.

Following the Wall Street crash of late October 1929, however, the rockets found themselves engaged for 20 weeks on Marcus Loew's circuit, performing for instance at the end of November, 1929 at Loew’s Midland Theatre in Kansas City, Missouri.

As cinema, through 'talkies', grew in popularity and radio offered free entertainment to those with receivers, the market for vaudeville faltered with the acrobat troupe subsequently finding work at the Ringling Bros. and Barnum and Bailey Circus. With the conclusion of the circus season on October 10th, 1930, and an unsuccessful attempt to re-brand as a Hula dance act, four members of the troupe returned to Europe in January 1931 as their visas expired.

== Fourth incarnation (1933) ==
Two engagements by The Six Rockets have been noted in April 1932 in Greeley, Colorado and in April 1933 at the Strand Theater in Endicott, where during the latter, the troupe reportedly displayed “dances of sensational ability by popular and beautiful girls.” The troupe at the time was thought to have been managed by Arno Büttner, since his father, Oswald Büttner, died in Hamburg, Germany on June 18, 1931.

== Sources ==
- 'Wandervögel: A Prussian Family’s Passage Through Leipzig', a family website by the author of this Wikipedia entry which features the fates and fortunes of two rockets’ members, Nanny and Margot Tyralla
- Frank Cullen. Vaudeville, Old and New: An Encyclopedia of Variety Performers in America. Routledge, 2006.
