= Rose Sydell =

American actress (1865–1941)

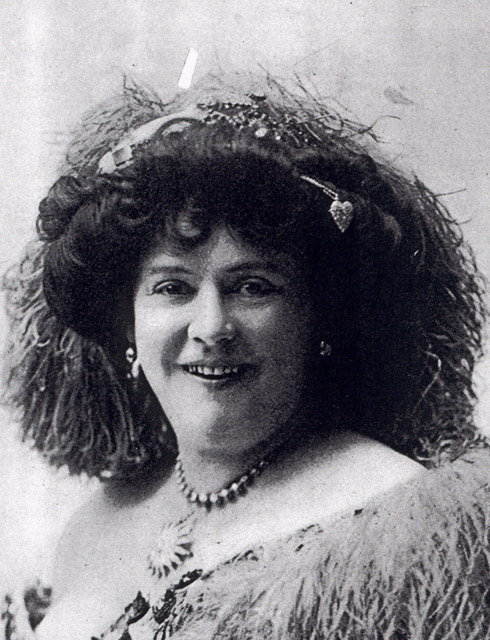
- New York Clipper 1910
- Born: Rosa Sidles, 1865; Covington, Kentucky, US
- Died: August 4, 1941 (aged 75–76); Brooklyn, New York City, US
- Occupations: Burlesque actor, producer, comedienne
- Years active: 1885–1927
- Spouse: William S. Campbell

Rose Sydell (born Rosa Sidles; 1865 – August 4, 1941) was an American burlesque actress. She starred in her own show, Rose Sydell and the London Belles, which toured the United States and Europe for 26 years. Sydell's penchant for wearing great quantities of valuable jewels and ostrich plumes secured her reputation as America's first Burlesque Queen.

== Rose Sydell and the London Belles ==
Born in Covington, Kentucky, Rose Sydell started her career as a ballet dancer at Robinson's Opera House in Cincinnati, Ohio. At 19, she entered burlesque after receiving an offer from producer Sam T. Jack. While playing at the London Theatre in New York City, Sydell met Jack's press agent, Williams S. Campbell, who was a famed burlesque comedian himself. Sydell and Campbell married and in 1893 formed the Rose Sydell Burlesque Company, which produced the London Belles. In addition to starring in the London Belles and creating her own lavish wardrobe, Sydell selected the chorus girls. She explained the audition process: “Every girl I chose...I first took to my own hotel room, had her slip on a pair of tights, and then considered the appearance of her legs as well as face.” For her own costume, Sydell avoided short skirts and tights. She wore long, extravagant dresses—accessorized with diamonds from her own collection—and left the strip teases to the chorus girls. In 1910, Variety criticized Sydell for piling on ermine fur and jewels, while dressing her pretty chorus girls in costumes that were “terribly shabby and very much soiled.”

With its combination of Sydell's celebrity, chorus girls, comical playlets, and popular songs, the London Belles tour was a burlesque attraction. It played in the US and Europe for over two decades. A contemporary review called Sydell its “bright and particular star.” Sydell was one of the first American burlesque actresses to appear on the cover of the New York Clipper. In a 1910 cover story, the Clipper's burlesque critic wrote, “There are very few stars to-day who are better known, and very few who are as popular, she being well known from coast to coast.”

These were the early days of burlesque and the London Belles were not without controversy. According to Sydell, some women would cross the street to avoid walking by a burlesque theatre. In 1893, several members of the Sydell Company were arrested after the New England Watch and Ward Society cited them for indecency. At the trial, William S. Campbell explained that a chorus girl had broken a strap and accidentally bared her breast on stage. The judge ruled in favor of the Sydell Company and the Watch and Ward Society were forced to apologize.

Sydell stopped performing with the London Belles in 1915 to focus her energies on women’s suffrage. She officially retired from show business in 1927. At a book launch party hosted by Farrar & Rinehart for Bernard Sobel's Burleycue in 1931, Sydell declared that “burlesque shows today are disgusting.”

Over her career, Sydell appeared with the principal stars of the burlesque industry, including Daisy Harcourt, and influenced a generation of burlesque queens, such as Mollie Williams.

== Personal life ==
Sydell married burlesque comedian William S. Campbell. Friends described them as being devoted to each other throughout their lives. The couple adopted Sydell's niece, who performed along with her aunt in the London Belles using the name Rose Sydell Jr.

Sydell and Campbell amassed considerable wealth in burlesque. The two owned stock in the Columbia Amusement Company from its inception, and bought additional stock in other corporations. They invested in real estate, purchasing a block of brownstones on State Street in Brooklyn, NY, as well as a hotel in Atlantic City. Sydell possessed a large collection of diamonds and other jewels.

Rose Sydell died at home on August 4, 1941. She was buried in Evergreen Cemetery, Brooklyn, New York City.
