= Harry Steppe =

American entertainer

- Born: Abraham Stepner; March 16, 1888
- Died: November 22, 1934 (aged 46); New York, NY
- Occupations: Actor, Comedian
- Years active: 1911 – 1934
- Spouse(s): Beatrice (1918); Victoria Dayton (1920-1922)(separated)

Harry Steppe (born Abraham Stepner), March 16, 1888 – November 22, 1934 was a Russian Jewish-American actor, musical comedy performer, headliner comedian, writer, librettist, director and producer, who toured North America working in Vaudeville and Burlesque. Steppe performed at several well-known theaters on the Columbia, Mutual and Orpheum circuits. Steppe was one of Bud Abbott's first partners.

== Early life ==
Born in Russia to Orthodox Jewish parents, Steppe and his family emigrated from Moscow to the U.S. through Ellis Island in 1892. In 1899, Steppe became a naturalized citizen of the United States.

Steppe's father was a tailor; his brother Michael was a vocalist. Another of Steppe's brothers was named Harry, but it is not known if this inspired part of Steppe's stage name.

Steppe lived in Newark, New Jersey and in Pittsburgh, Pennsylvania. At age 29, Steppe claimed an exemption from the World War I draft on the grounds that he supported his widowed mother.

== Relationships ==
Steppe married twice. His first wife Beatrice, an actress in "Razzle Dazzle of 1918," died at the age of 25 from the Spanish flu, the same year they were married. This sudden loss may have contributed to speculation about Harry's personal struggles with depression.

Other paramours of Harry Steppe included Vaudeville performers Victoria "Vic" Dayton, whom he married in 1920, Edna Raymond and Leona St. Clair. Steppe was often billed with actress Lola Pierce, to whom he was also reportedly linked romantically.

== Career ==
Known to theater patrons as "The Hebrew Gent," Steppe was billed as a Hebrew, Jewish-dialect or Yiddish-dialect character comedian. "Ignatz Cohen," one of Steppe's alter egos, became a recurring and popular character based on an ethnic Jewish stereotype. Many of Steppe's variety shows featured musical revues and olios with dancing girls, comedy sketches and specialty acts. One performance of Steppe's "Girls from the Follies" featured "eight cycling models with thrilling stunts on wheels," operatic songs, ballroom dancing and chorus girls.

Phil Silvers and others credited Steppe with "introducing the phrase 'top banana' into show business jargon in 1927 as a synonym for the top comic on the bill. It rose out of a routine, full of doubletalk, in which three comics tried to share two bananas." Silvers further popularized the term "Top Banana" in his 1951 Broadway musical and 1954 film of the same name. Steppe also claimed to have coined the phrase "Second Banana."

Steppe had a version of a shell game routine called "The Lemon Bit," that used lemons instead of peas. He performed it with Bud Abbott in burlesque, and Abbott later performed it with Costello in burlesque; in the Broadway musical "Streets of Paris"; in their movie "In the Navy"; live on the "Colgate Comedy Hour"; and in their television program "The Abbott & Costello Show."

=== Agents and management ===
Harry Steppe was represented by several theatrical agencies during his career, including Cain & Davenport and Chamberlain and Lyman Brown. Some of his shows were produced by Sam N. Reichblum and well-known burlesque producer I.H. Herk. Steppe also secured theater bookings through the support of entertainment circuits, or "wheels" such as the B.F. Keith Vaudeville Exchange, the Columbia Amusement Company (so-called "clean" burlesque) and the Mutual Burlesque Association.

== Death ==
When Steppe became gravely ill and unable to work, his friends in show business staged a fundraiser on his behalf. However, Steppe died in poverty. Pulmonary edema contributed to Steppe's death, according to his death certificate. He was at Bellevue Hospital in New York, New York for two days and had been ill for a month, according to a story in Variety magazine, Nov. 27, 1934. He is buried in New Jersey.

== Stage productions ==
Here is an ever-expanding table of documented theatrical productions.

Performances
Year	Month	City & State	Theater	Show Title	Players & Notables	Media Coverage
1911	Apr		Majestic Theater	The Two Strollers; Musical Comedy	Harry Steppe; Toney Murphy; Smuckler Sisters	Portsmouth Daily Times
1911	May		Kenyon Theater	Loveland	Harry Steppe (as Ignatz Cohen); Ben Masten; Jack Daily; Leona Thompson, singer Berti Wyatt, dancer Gertie Fay, dancer	Pittsburgh Press
1912	Apr	Marion, OH	Sun Theater	Girl from Daffydill	Harry Steppe (as Ignatz Cohen)	Marion Daily Star
1912			Olympic	Girls from the Follies		
1913	Sep			Girls from the Follies		Indianapolis Star
1913	Sep	Kansas City, MO		Girls from the Follies		Kansas City Star, The
1913	Oct	Chicago, IL		Girls from the Follies		Suburbanite Economist
1913	Nov	Boston, MA	Howard Athenaeum	Girls from the Follies		Boston Globe
1913		Cleveland, OH	Empire	Girls from the Follies		
1914	Jan	Pittsburgh, PA	Victoria	Girls from the Follies		Pittsburgh Press
1914	Mar	Toronto, ON Canada	Star Theater	Girls from the Follies		Toronto Sunday World
1914	Apr	Boston, MA	Howard Athenaeum			Boston Daily Globe
1914	May	Hartford, CT	Poli Palace Theater; Main and Gold Streets	Those Kissing Girls; Musical Comedy		Hartford Courant
1914	Jun		St. James	Kissing Girls	Harry Steppe; Oscar Lorraine, violinist Ed and Jack Smith, dancers	Boston Evening Transcript
1914	Aug		Murray Hill Theatre	Girls from the Follies	Harry Steppe; Charles Quinn; Vesta Lockard; Gertrude Balston; Forrest G. Wyre; Jessie Quinn; Annie Goldie; Marie Revere; Harry Fisher; William Harris	New York Times
1914	Sep	Pittsburgh, PA	Victoria	Girls from the Follies	Harry Steppe; Charles Quinn; Vesta Lockard; Gertrude Balston; Forrest G. Wyre; Jessie Quinn; Annie Goldie; Marie Revere; Harry Fisher; William Harris	Pittsburgh Press
1914	Nov	Boston, MA	Howard Athenaeum	Girls from the Follies		Boston Daily Globe
1914		Baltimore, MD	Gayety	Girls from the Follies		
1915	Jan	Toronto	Star Theater	Girls from the Follies; Two-act Musical Farce	Harry Steppe; Vesta Lockard; Gertude Walston; Mabel Reflow; George L. Wagner; William M. Harris; Billy Moore; Harry Fisher; Solly Hito; Dan Pierce, Star Theater Manager	Toronto World
1915	March	Indianapolis, IN		Girls from the Follies	Harry Steppe	Indianapolis Star
1915	May		Victoria	Girls from the Follies	Harry Steppe; Vesta Lockhard; Gertude Ralston; Mabel Reflow, dancer George L. Wagner; William M. Harris; Harry Van; Harry Fisher; Solly Hito, dancer	Pittsburgh Press
1915	Sep	Pittsburgh, PA	Victoria	Lady Pirates		Pittsburgh Press
1915	Oct	Trenton, NJ				Trenton Evening Times
1915		Cleveland, OH	Bijou			
1915		Louisville, KY	Buckingham	Girls from the Follies		
1915		Detroit, MI	Cadillac	Girls from the Follies		
1915		Detroit, MI	Cadillac	Lady Pirates		
1915		Philadelphia, PA	Casino	Girls from the Follies		
1915		Rochester, NY	Corinthian	Girls from the Follies		
1915		Ft. Wayne, IN	Majestic	Girls from the Follies		
1915			Razzier			
1915		Pittsburgh, PA	Victoria	Girls from the Follies		
1915		Pittsburgh, PA	Victoria	Keeny's Harry Steppe & George Martin		
1916	Jan	Ft. Wayne, IN		Girls from the Follies		Ft Wayne Daily News
1916	Jan	Ft. Wayne, IN		Cohen in Chinatown; Two-act musical comedy		Ft. Wayne Journal-Gazette
1916		Philadelphia, PA	Cabaret	Girls from the Follies		
1916		St. Louis, MO	Standard	Girls from the Follies		
1916		Louisville, KY	Buckingham	Girls from the Follies; Cohen on the East Side; Two-act musical burlesque		Reedy's Mirror
1916			Olympic			
1916		Newark, NJ	Loews	Harry Steppe at the Loews		
1916			Loews	Step Lively Girls		
1916		Louisville, KY	Buckingham	Girls from the Follies		
1916		Cleveland, OH	Empire	Cohen's Review		
1916		Philadelphia, PA	Trocadero	Follies		
1916		Milwaukee, WI	Gayety			
1917	Jan	Trenton, NJ		Hello Girls		Trenton Evening Times
1917	Feb	Brooklyn, NY	Howard Athenaeum			Boston Daily Globe
1917		Brooklyn, NY	Star			
1918	Aug	Philadelphia, PA	Gayety; 5th below Vine	Razzle Dazzle Girls	Harry Steppe; Grace Fletcher	Evening Public Ledger
1918	Oct		Star Theater	Razzle Dazzle of 1918	Harry Steppe; Bunnie Mack, comedian Grace Fletcher, soubrette Percie Judah; Mike Fertig, singer Sydia Dunn, singer Palmer Hines, straight man	Toronto World
1919	Jan	Pittsburgh, PA	Victoria	Razzle Dazzle of 1919	Harry Steppe; Lew Denny; Mike Fertig, singer Billy Halperin; Percie Judah; Sydia Dunn, singer Grace Fletcher	Pittsburgh Press
1919	Feb	Washington, DC		Razzle Dazzle	Harry Steppe; Grace Fletcher	Washington Post
1919	Mar	Trenton, NJ		Razzle Dazzle		
1919		Columbus, OH	Lyceum	Razzle Dazzle		
1919			Peoples Theatre	American Supreme		
1920		Columbus, OH		Razzle Dazzle of 1919		
1920				Tid Bits of 1920		
1920			Buckingham	Misfit Cohen		
1920			Gayety	Harry Steppe and His Rumba Girls		
1921	Jun	New York, NY	Loew's Metropolitan		Harry Steppe, headliner Dick Lancaster	New York Tribune
1921	Jun	New York, NY	Loew's American		Harry Steppe, headliner Chappelle and Stinnett	New York Tribune
1921	Sep	New York, NY	Columbia; Broadway & 47th St.	Jingle Jingle	Harry Steppe; Harry O'Neal	New York Times
1921		Washington, DC			Harry Steppe; Harry O'Neal; Frank Anderson	Washington Post
1923	Apr	Los Angeles, CA	Hillstreet	Just a Debate	Harry Steppe; Harry O'Neal	Los Angeles Times
1923		New York, NY	Columbia Playhouse			
1924	Sep		Gayety Theater Columbia Burlesque	Harry Steppe and His Big Show	Harry Steppe; Harry O'Neal; Vic Casmore; Solly Hito, dancer Mabel Reflow, dancer	Canadian Jewish Chronicle; The Axe (Montreal)
1924	Nov	Bridgeport, CT		Harry Steppe and His Big Show		Bridgeport Telegram
1924	Dec		Gayety		Harry Steppe; Dorothy Golden, dancer	Pittsburgh Press
1925	Jan		Gayety Theater Columbia Burlesque	Harry Steppe and His Big Show	Harry Steppe; Harry O'Neal; Mabel Reflow; Lola Pierce	Pittsburgh Press
1925	March			Harry Steppe and His Big Show	Harry Steppe; Harry O'Neal	Chicago Tribune
1925	Apr		Empire Theater; Temperance Street; Columbia Burlesque (Columbia Circuit)	Cain and Davenport present Harry Steppe and His Big Show; Week of April 13	Harry Steppe; Harry O'Neal; Vic Casmore; Hite and (Mabel) Reflow, singer George McClennon, comedian	Canadian Jewish Review
1925	May	New York, NY	Columbia Theater; Times Square (Columbia Circuit)	O.K.	Harry Steppe; Harry O'Neal; Mabel Reflow, singer Lola Pierce, singer George McClennon, dancer Miller and Ryan, dancers Three Golfers, acrobats Solly Hito, juvenile and a whistler	New York Times
1925	Aug		(New) Lyric Theater	O.K.	Harry Steppe; George McClennon; Owen Martin, straight man Vic Casmore; Mite; Mabel Reflow, singer	Bridgeport Telegraph
1925	Sep		Gayety	Harry Steppe and His Big Show	Harry Steppe; Vic Casmore	Pittsburgh Press
1925	Oct	Cleveland, OH	Columbia	Steppe's Own Show	Harry Steppe; George McClennon	Afro-American
1925	Oct	Zanesville, OH	Weller; Columbia Circuit	Harry Steppe and His Big Show	Harry Steppe; Owen Martin, straight man George McClennon, jazz clarinetist Jacque Wilson, blues singer Carmen Sisters, dancers Rube Walman, whistler	Zanesville Times Signal; Zanesville Signal; Zanesville Times Signal
1926	Apr	Boston, MA	Casino Theater (Columbia Circuit)	Steppe's Own Show		Afro-American
1926	June	New York, NY		The Lemon Bit		New York Times
1926		Boston, MA	Gaiety Theater	Harry Steppe's OK		Gaiety Theater Study Report
1927	Jul	Milwaukee, WI	Majestic Theatre	The Debate	Harry Steppe; Lola Pierce	Milwaukee Sentinel
1927	Oct	Atlanta, GA		The Supper Club; The Debate	Harry Steppe; Lola Pierce	Atlanta Constitution
1928	Feb	Decatur, Illinois		Matrimony à la Carte with Lola Pierce		
1928	June	New York, NY	Loew's Theater			Loew's Weekly
1929	Sep		Gayety	Harry Steppe and His Own Big Show		Canadian Jewish Review
1929	Dec	Washington, DC	9th Street	Harry Steppe and His Show		Washington Post
1929	Dec	Pittsburgh, PA	Academy Theater	Harry Steppe and His Show; Monte Carlo; Fortune Hunters	Harry Steppe; Betty and Bud Abbott; Billie Holmes, blues singer Frances Knight, ingenue Rube Walman; Lee Baird, second comedian Gertie Foreman; Jerry DeVere	Pittsburgh Press
1930	Sep		Orpheum Theatre	Harry Steppe and His Show		Reading Eagle
1930	Oct	Pittsburgh, PA	Academy Theater	Harry Steppe and His Big Show	Harry Steppe; Jeanne Steele, jazz singer Ann Clair, ingenue Lloyd and Ardell; Wilbur Dobbs, comedian George Raymond, baritone Dixon and Morrell, sister act	Pittsburgh Press
1931	Mar		Orpheum Theater (Mutual Circuit)	Fashion Parade	Harry Steppe; Sonny Kest, ingenue Lee Hickman; Dorothy Alexander	Reading Eagle
1931	Oct	Pittsburgh, PA	Academy Theater (Columbia Circuit)	Rumba Girls	Harry Steppe; Jerri McCauley	Pittsburgh Post-Gazette
1933	Apr		Ritz		Harry Steppe; Max Furman; Lew Patel; Eddie Dale; Harry Burns; Olsen and Johnson	Syracuse Herald
1933	Nov	Hartford, CT	Parsons Theater		Harry Steppe; Eddie Lloyd, comedian Lew Denny, straight man	Hartford Courant
1934	Sep		Variety	Red Hot	Harry Steppe; Joe DeRita; Happy Hyatt; Abe Sher; Al Golden, director	Pittsburgh Post-Gazette; Pittsburgh Press

== Sources ==
- "Really The Blues," by Mezz Mezzrow and Bernard Wolfe, Citadel Press (Trade Paper), 1990, pg.27. ISBN 0-8065-1205-9. Excerpt: "You could see most of the celebrities of the day, colored and white, hanging around the De Luxe. Bill Robinson, the burlesque comedian Harry Steppe, comedian Benny Davis, Joe Frisco, Al Jolson, Sophie Tucker, Blossom Seeley, a lot of Ziegfeld Follies actors..."
- American song: the complete musical theatre companion, by Ken Bloom, 1985, Page 130
