= Globe Trotters (Burlesque) =

Globe Trotters (Burlesque) was a burlesque organization which was formed in 1914. It included some of the most well known names in burlesque entertainment. Globe Trotters debuted at the Columbia Theatre in New York City, in September 1914. They presented The Dowry Breakers, an original satire in two acts. The play featured original scenes and costumes which were considered most effective. The burlesque show included approximately twenty musical numbers.
