= Hinda Wausau =

American burlesque performer (1906–1980)

Hinda Wausau (1906–1980) a.k.a. Hinda Wassau, Hinda Wasau, or Hindu Wausau, was a star stripteaser in burlesque. She claimed, and has been credited with, inadvertently inventing the striptease around 1928 at either the Haymarket or State-Congress Theater in Chicago when her costume started coming off during a shimmy dance. (Other performers have made similar claims and have also been credited.)

== Early career ==
Wausau was born Catharine (or Catherine) Vaszauskas in Milwaukee and according to some accounts, took her stage name from nearby Wausau, Wisconsin. She began dancing in burlesque in her teens as a chorus girl in the 1924 Columbia burlesque show "Town Scandals". Two years later Wausau was a featured dancer in the Mutual Burlesque show "Jazztime Revue" along with future star Ann Corio.

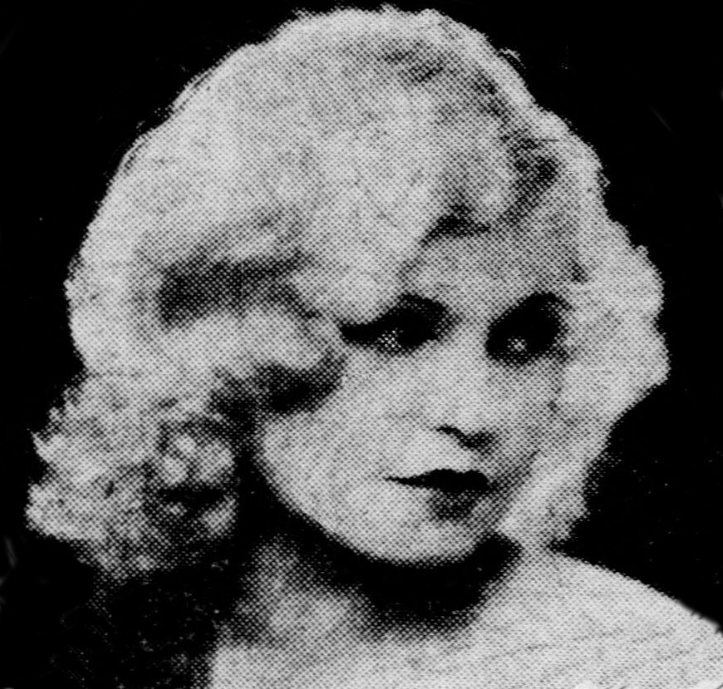
Hinda Wassau in 1930

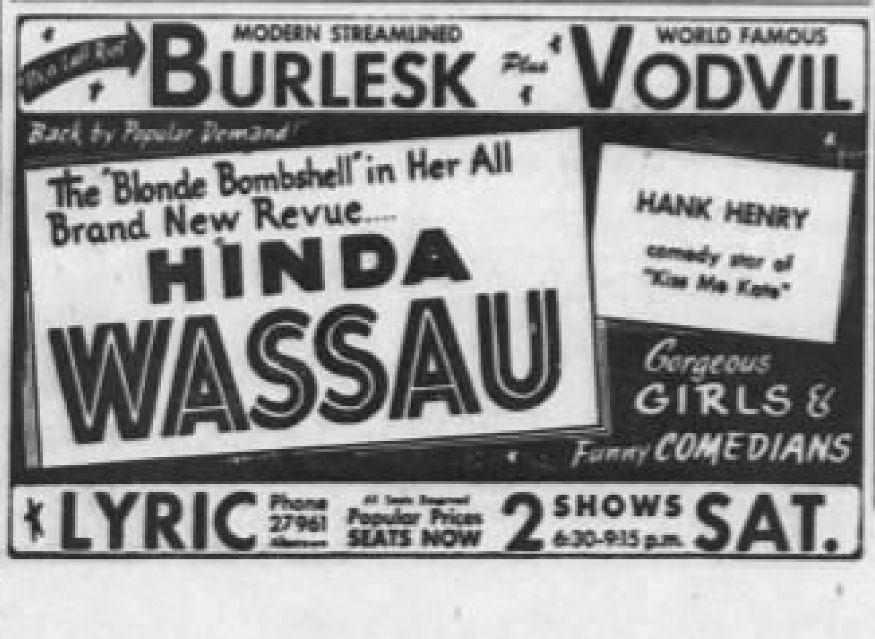
1952 newspaper advertisement with last name misspelled

On Feb. 24, 1927 Wausau was arrested by a police woman for "immoral dancing" at the Empress Theater in Milwaukee. Wausau's costume, a flesh-colored bathing suit, had been approved by censors earlier; it was her suggestive gyrations that led to the arrest. The publicity resulted in packed theaters. By the time her case came up in court, however, Wausau was performing in another city. She was fined $50, which the management of the Empress paid. The notoriety quickly made her a sensation in burlesque and she attracted more women to her shows than other strip artists. She returned to the Empress Theater often.

== Stardom ==
In 1928 Wausau and Corio each headed their own shows on the Mutual circuit: Wausau had "The Hindu Belles," and Corio had "The Girls in Blue." Emphasizing the "tease" rather the "strip," they each toured for years and were burlesque's biggest draws. Wausau did not dance in the strictest sense, but walked provocatively across the stage, sang, posed, gyrated, and talked to her audience as she disrobed.

In 1932 Wausau became the first burlesque dancer to perform at the Publix Theater, a Paramount Studios house, in Minneapolis. She briefly returned to burlesque where Variety noted, "...she stands out in burlesk as the one gal who can satisfy a mob without getting down to the last ribbon. More than ever she's insisting on keeping her clothes on." She was signed by Billy Rose for his revue which showcased Eleanor Powell and Hal Le Roy. Premiering in late July 1932, Wausau was described by Rose as "the best cooch dancer since Gilda Gray first startled the public."

In the early 1930s Wausau appeared in Minsky's burlesque shows, the Chicago World's Fair, and nightclubs, including Billy Rose's Casino de Paree and Leon & Eddie's. She frequently performed to sell-out burlesque crowds in Minneapolis and at the Gayety in Washington, D.C. throughout the decade. Ahead of a 1939 appearance at the Gayety, the Washington D.C. Evening Star gushed, "All is happy and gay upon Ninth Street, for Hinda Wassau [sic] has come to town again. So for a week now the Gayety will be packed to its revered rafters by the citizens who would look upon Hinda, the inimitable; Wassau, the one and only. She is magnificent, this girl; there is no getting around the fact. For the record it might be again noted that she is still wild as ever and unrestrained; in fact, probably the least restrained of anybody in her business, which may or may not be saying a lot. Anyhow you practically have to see Hinda Wassau before your education is complete, and here she is."

Ann Corio once described Wausau's act: "Hinda was the first stripper to expose the bosom. She wore a negligee – sheer top – the waist to the floor made of chiffon petals. She'd tease with the negligee – put it on backwards so the outline of her bosom was even more clearly seen through the material. This was even sexier than exposing herself completely, as any striptease star can tell you. At the finish of her act she'd give the boys a quick flash – that ultimate revelation of the bosom in an instant which leaves the audience wondering if it was a dream."

Wausau's act was recalled by essayist James M. Merritt in a 1994 piece for the Baltimore Sun: "However, one of the ecdysiasts approached her work differently. Her name was Hinda Wasau [sic], and when she came on, the curtain was raised because she was going to need the whole stage. She strode about laughing lustily while unhooking the integral parts of her costume and tossing them away contemptuously. The joie de vivre she exuded was contagious. Suddenly, she would stop, spread her legs and, with her back to the audience, clasp her hands behind her flaming red hair. She would then palpitate her cheeks, singly or in unison, in perfect time with the orchestra's martial tempo. From these descriptions, it should be clear that I approached these exhibitions with the objective attitude of an art critic called to judge a recently discovered cache of nudes by Rubens. How else can I explain the ringing in my ears every time I think of Hinda's act? I firmly believe the great state of Wisconsin named a town and its insurance company after its favorite daughter."

Walter Cronkite said that one of his most memorable interviews was with Hinda. When he asked her about the role of burlesque in boosting wartime morale, Wausau grabbed him by the lapels. "Let me tell you something," she snarled at the shaken Cronkite. "The morals behind a burlesque stage are just as good as the morals at Radio City."

Wausau was active in burlesque into the early 1950s. On May 1, 1954, she performed what she said was her retirement show in the Lyric Theater, PA, after which she retired "to her dog-breeding farm in Maryland". According to Lou Ascol, in May 1981 she was living in Milwaukee, though her 1980 Obituary would show otherwise.

She was tested several times for Hollywood film contracts, but to no resulting roles. Wausau was considered for the role of Sadie Thompson in a revival of Rain at a Rochester, New York stock theater in June 1940. The character was made famous by Jeanne Eagels in the 1920s.

== Personal life ==
Wausau was managed by Rube Bernstein (1883–1954), who became her first husband in February 1932. He was 23 years her senior. Wausau was planning a divorce in February 1941 but they were still married a year later. Bernstein was also Ann Corio's manager until Corio discovered that Wausau was getting better breaks and dancing at a competitor club. Corio, who had moved from burlesque to vaudeville and was heading a troupe at Fay's Theater in Philadelphia, Pennsylvania, fired Bernstein.

In 1954, she was married to Richard Smith, with whom she owned the Hectic Acres kennels at Colesville, MD. The couple raised pedigreed boxers, including the champion "Mr. Celebrity". They were married until her death in 1980.
