= Columbus Theatre (New York City) =

Theater in Manhattan, New York

- Interactive map of Columbus Theatre
- Address: 114 E. 125th Street, Manhattan, New York City
- Location: Between Park Avenue and Lexington Avenue
- Coordinates: 40°48′16″N 73°56′19″W
- Owner: Oscar Hammerstein I
- Capacity: 1,649
- Type: Theatre

Construction
- Built: 1890
- Opened: October 1890
- Closed: 1957
- Architect: J. B. McElfatrick & Sons

The Columbus Theatre was a theater located at 114 E. 125th Street between Park Avenue and Lexington Avenue. It was the second theater built by theatrical impresario Oscar Hammerstein I. The architects were J. B. McElfatrick & Sons.

The Columbus Theatre originally sat 1,649 people and was a major venue for musical theatre, vaudeville, and minstrel shows in Upper Manhattan. The theater also occasionally served as an opera house, and sometimes presented plays ranging from classic works by William Shakespeare to new plays written by Americans. It opened in October 1890. The theater was sold to F. F. Proctor in 1899 and was then renamed Proctor's 125th Street Theatre. It was later re-titled Keith & Proctor's 125th Street Theatre about a year later when Proctor formed a partnership with Benjamin Franklin Keith. After that partnership fell apart in 1911, it was once again known as Proctor's 125th Street Theatre or simply Proctor's Theatre. It was purchased by RKO sometime in the 1930s, and operated as a move theater entitled RKO Proctor's 125th Street Theatre until it closed in 1957.
