= J. B. McElfatrick =

American architect

John Bailey McElfatrick (1828–1906) was an architect known for his design of theaters in the United States and Canada. He eventually went into practice with his sons William H. McElfatrick and John Morgan McElfatrick (1853–1891) in the firm J. B. McElfatrick & Sons.

== Early life ==
McElfatrick studied architecture and engineering with his father, Edward McElfatrick.

== Career ==
In 1851, he established a practice with offices in Harrisburg, Pennsylvania and Philadelphia. The firm later expanded to St Louis, Cleveland, and Chicago. He also designed theaters in Ottawa and Montreal in Canada. He is credited with the design of more than 100 theaters and for instituting improved sight lines, multiple exits, fire sprinkler systems, and continuous rows of seating without aisles on the ground floor.

His works include the Central Colored School at 542 West Kentucky Street in Louisville, Kentucky, which is listed on the National Register of Historic Places. Several theaters he designed, including BAM Harvey Theater in Brooklyn, Metropolitan Opera House in Philadelphia, Miller Symphony Hall in Allentown, Pennsylvania, remain in use as of the early 21st century.

== Works ==
- Brooklyn Academy of Music's BAM Harvey Theater in Brooklyn (open)
- Colonial Theatre in Pittsfield, Massachusetts
- Metropolitan Opera House in Philadelphia (open)
- Miller Symphony Hall in Allentown, Pennsylvania (open), by William H. McElfatrick
- National Theatre in Washington, D.C., an earlier building
- New Victory Theatre in New York City (open)
- Waynesburg Theater & Arts Center in Waynesburg
- Bijou Theatre (1883) at 1239 Broadway in Manhattan
- Harlem Opera House (1889)
- Columbus Theatre (1890)
- Court Square Theater in Springfield, Massachusetts (1892)
- Holyoke Opera House (1894, refurbishing of galleries and stage)
- Hammerstein's Olympia (1895)
- Parsons Theatre (1896)
- Harlem Alhambra (1905)
- Manhattan Opera House (1906)
- Gayety Theater (1906) in Baltimore
- Howard Auditorium Music Hall (1895) in Baltimore
