= William H. McElfatrick =

American architect

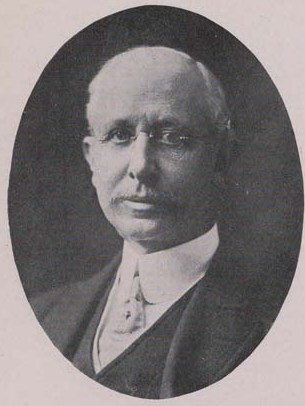
- McElfatrick in 1914
- Born: 1854; Fort Wayne, Indiana, U.S.
- Died: September 28, 1922 (aged 67–68); Brooklyn, New York, U.S.
- Occupation: Architect
- Known for: Theaters

William H. McElfatrick (1854 - September 28, 1922) was an American architect who specialized in theaters.

== Early life ==
McElfatrick was born in Fort Wayne, Indiana, in 1854, son of the theater architect John Bailey McElfatrick. He learned the architect's trade from his father.

== Career ==
McElfatrick moved to Chicago after the Great Chicago Fire of 1871, and joined the William W. Boyington company.

By 1880, he moved to New York City, where he worked with his father in J. B. McElfatrick & Son. His brother John M. McElfatrick (1853–1891) also joined the family firm.

McElfatrick remained in New York City after his father died in 1906, and continued to specialize in theaters, but moved the office to Brooklyn. The McElfatrick firm designed many theaters and introduced innovations that included better floor layouts and sight lines, multiple exits, and fire sprinkler systems. McElfatrick became known as the "father of the American theater architecture."

McElfatrick died at his home in Brooklyn, New York on September 28, 1922.

== Works ==
The Gayety Theatre was completed in 1907 at 513 9th Street, NW, in Washington, D.C. The entrance on 9th Street was no wider than a store front, but led to a large complex that extended to 8th street. Inside and out the decor was eccentric and lavish. The three-story auditorium decorated in ivory and gold could seat 1,500, with a stage 65 feet (20 m) wide and 34 feet (10 m) deep. Arches above the boxes on each side of the stage held plaster figures of the muses by Ernest C. Bairstow (1876–1962). The theater originally was a member of the Columbia Circuit of Burlesque theaters. After going through many changes, the theater was torn down in November 1959.

McElfatrick designed the Majestic Theatre in Jersey City, New Jersey, built by the Klein Amusement Company in 1907 and owned by Frank E. Henderson. The 2,300-seat theater has a Beaux Art neo-classical design. An electric marquee of art metal and glass roofing dominated the outside. The interior included a grand eight-foot wide staircase, neoclassical painted murals on canvas, a domed ceiling with allegorical Greek goddesses, pillars of faux marble and crystal chandeliers. The proscenium stage was 77 feet (23 m) wide. There were two balconies, twelve opera boxes, and a Wurlitzer piano-organ. Until 1917, the theater was used for light theater, before becoming a cinema.

On January 10, 1910, the Columbia Amusement Company opened the Columbia Theatre, "Home of Burlesque De Luxe", at Broadway and 47th Street in Manhattan. The theater was designed by McElfatrick and had a capacity of 1,385.

The Empire Theatre in Baltimore opened in 1910 as a vaudeville house, designed by McElfatrick and the local architect Otto Simonson. It went through many changes in the years that followed, as a Yiddish theater, boxing arena, bingo house, burlesque theatre, parking garage and cinema. He also was the architect for the Bushwick Theatre in Bedford–Stuyvesant, Brooklyn which was built in 1911.

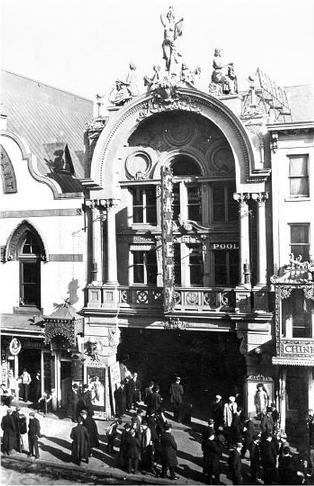
Gayety Theatre in Washington, D.C., circa 1907

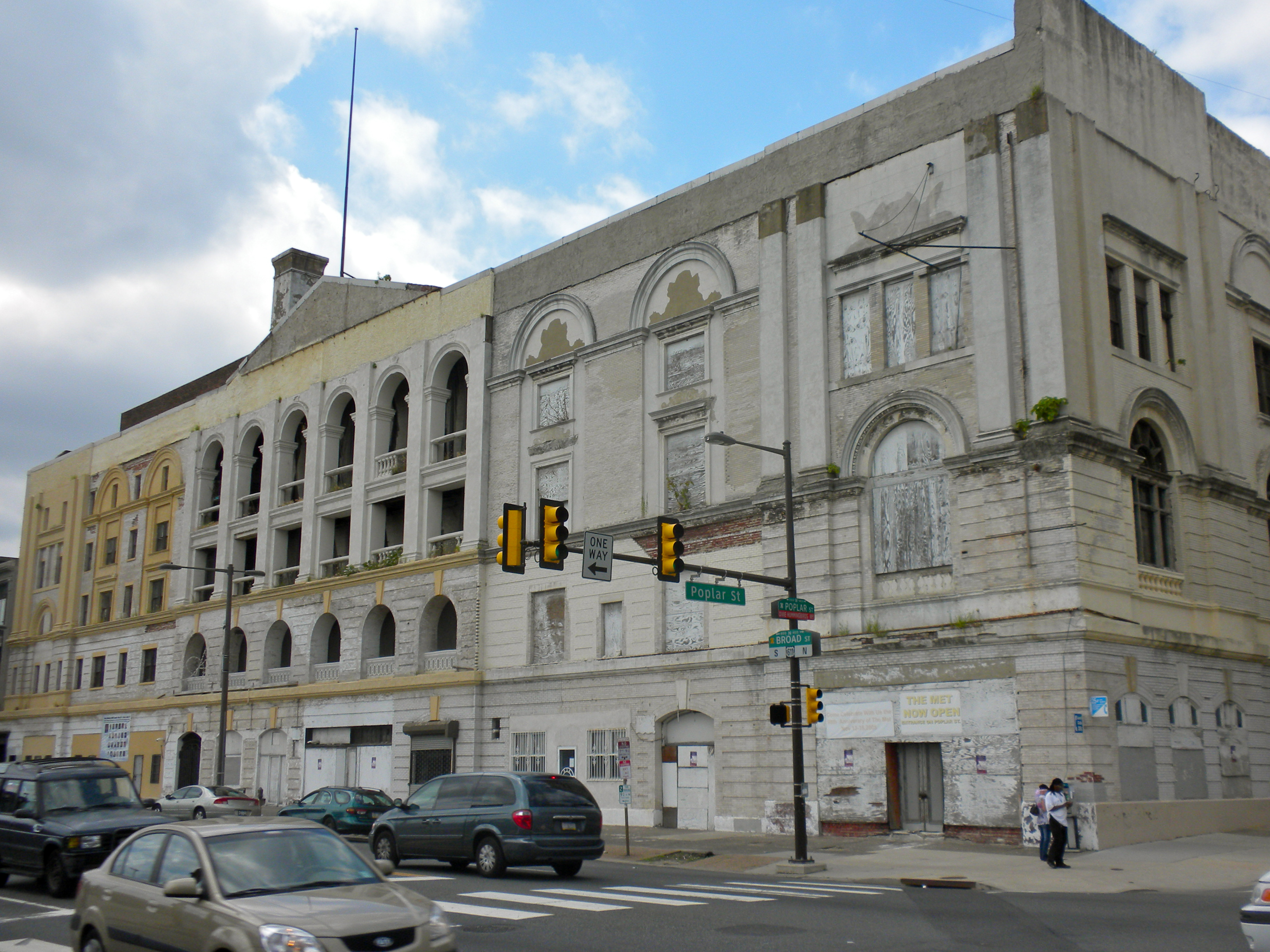
Metropolitan Opera House in Philadelphia

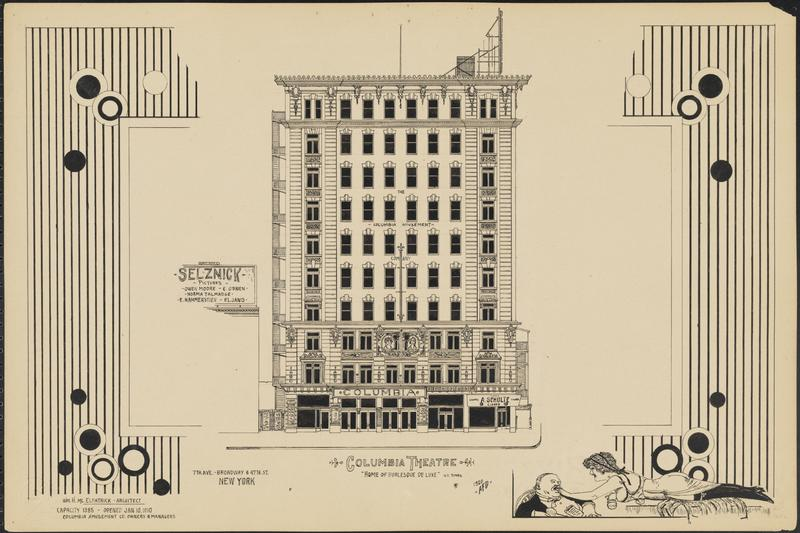
Columbia Theatre at 7th Avenue in Manhattan

RKO Bushwick Theatre (originally the Bushwick Theatre) in 1974.
