= Beef Trust (burlesque) =

American burlesque chorus line

Beef Trust, in the context of American burlesque, was a chorus line composed of large and beautiful women known as Billy Watson's "Beef Trust." Use of the phrase in American burlesque was adopted after the turn of the 20th century (around 1909) by Billy Watson (né Isaac Levy; 1852–1945), a comedian, theater manager, and stock company entrepreneur.

== History ==
Watson branded the name "Beef Trust" to represent a burlesque act featuring large beautiful women (e.g., "Three Tons of Women") who performed in his burlesque musical revues. The act became nationally known as "Billy Watson's 'Beef Trust.'" The phrase "Beef Trust," in burlesque, was exclusive to Watson's shows; and the phrase – in connection with Watson's shows – was not pejorative. That is, the phrase was "founded on a belief that beauty was based on plumpness." Watson conceived and introduced the "Beef Trust" show in an era that followed a sobering reality encapsulated in a 1906 novel, The Jungle – Upton Sinclair's exposé of the Chicago stockyards, which followed a 1905 Supreme Court decision in favor of the U.S. Government – re: Swift & Co. v. United States – a decision that destroyed a monopolistic consortium (or syndicate) of large meatpacking concerns, led by the "Big Six" (Swift, Armour, Morris, Cudahy, Wilson, and Schwartzchild), known as a Beef Trust.

=== Krausemeyer's Alley ===
Watson debuted his Beef Trust act – "a chorus of thirty of the largest women ever seen on stage" – May 17, 1909, at the Bijou Theatre, Philadelphia, as an addition to his popular three-act vaudeville skit, Krausemeyer's Alley – a comedy that he had been producing, in various renditions, since 1903, when he introduced it with another of his popular skits, Life in Japan. The play was originally in two acts:

1. "Krausemeyer's Alley"
2. "Krausemeyer's Christening"

=== Billy Watson's Chicken Trust ===
From about 1916 to about 1928, Watson produced the "Chicken Trust," a chorus line composed thin and reportedly beautiful women. They toured with his show on the Mutual Burlesque circuit.

=== Watson's legacy in burlesque ===
With respect to Watson's legacy in the world of burlesque, specifically his drawing power, Sime Silverman, founding editor of Variety magazine, declared him a burlesque institution – one that "must be accepted as a foundation of the Western Burlesque Wheel," which was also known as the "Empire Burlesque Circuit," of which, Watson was part owner.

=== Common confusion with another Billy Watson ===
Billy Watson of this article is not to be confused with Sliding Billy Watson (né William Shapiro; 1876–1939), a popular vaudeville comedian. (Note: The Billy Watson of this article, was throughout his career, often confused with Sliding Billy Watson (né William Shapiro; 1876–1939), a highly popular and wealthy comedian on the burlesque circuit who, seemingly adopted the name ("Sliding Billy Watson, 1876–1939 Collection," University of Texas at Austin, Harry Ransom Center; OCLC 969461978))

=== Coates and Grundy's Watermelon Trust ===
At least one other notable vaudevillian show, that of Coates and Grundy, used the "trust" concept; to wit: Coates and Grundy "Watermelon Trust," which ran from about 1900 to 1914. It started as one of two skits in a show ... the other skit being the "Kissing Trust." The show was part of a three-day engagement at the Academy of Music in Wilmington, Delaware, October 15, 16, and 17, 1900, featuring James Grundy, Susie Grundy, Sherman Coates, Lulu Coates, and Tenny Russell. The show was put on by Matt Flynn's Big Sensation Burlesque Company. The two skits featured James Grundy, Susie Grundy, Sherman Coates (billed as Thomas Coates), Lulu Coates, and Tenny Russell. (Note: Sherman Coates (1872–1912) was a pioneer of acro dancing; he was part of a vaudevillian burlesque comedy duo with James Grundy (1876–1911); Coates was the straight man; and with their wives, Lulu Coates and Sue Grundy (née Susan Fisher; 1877–1935, later married to Zeno Blackwell), and Tennie Russell (who replaced Gertine Miller) as Sam Patterson's (1881–1955) "Watermelon Trust" on tours, coast-to-coast; was part of the Harry Bryant Extravaganza Burlesque Company; Harry C. Bryant was formerly with Sefton & Watson, composed of Harry Sefton and Billy "Beef Trust" Watson, né Isaac Levy; 1852–1945), owned by Mr. Hill; in 1914, Lulu Coates and Archie Leon Ware (1892–1974), Wilfred Blanks (born 1900), Harry Irons (1898–1943), Clifford James Carter (1893–1942) formed a singing-dance troupe, the "Crackerjacks;" Lulu Coates was director until her retirement in 1922, but the Crackerjacks flourished until about 1952; this act pioneered a type of dance chronicled as Acro dance)

"The Watermelon Trust" is also the name of a popular American song composed by Harry C. Thompson, who dedicated it to Coates and Grundy. Thompson composed it in the style of a slow drag. The song was copyrighted in 1906 and published by Barron & Thompson Co., a New York music publishing firm of Ted S. Barron (né Theodore S. Barron; 1879–1943) and the composer, Harry Chester Thompson (1876–1947).

== Historical context of the phrase ==
Prevalent sometime in the mid-1880s, industry trusts, in the United States – roughly described as unincorporated consortiums; that is, trusts composed of powerful industry concerns – colluded in large-scale market manipulation schemes that were deemed to be anti-competitive (i.e., injurious to the public). To stem this practice, a landmark Federal statute, the Sherman Antitrust Act, was passed by the 51st Congress in 1890.

Billy Watson's "Beef Trust" burlesque was not technically a trust. Rather, it was a contemporaneous phrase, a double entendred satirical word play that essentially branded a popular segment of Watson's production that featured large, beautiful women.

However, there were trusts within the theater industry. York University theater scholar Marlis Schweitzer in her 2015 book, Transatlantic Broadway: The Infrastructural Politics of Global Performance, highlights examples of warring vaudeville trusts across Europe and the U.S. (circa 1897). Schweitzer states that, "The formation of syndicates and trusts across various sectors of the theater industry sparked protests among theater artists, journalists, and rival managers."

Syndicates and trusts in the theater industry at the turn of the 20th-century should not be confused with the United Kingdom's Theatres Trust, a national initiative enacted in 1976 to protect and promote theatre.

== Selected productions ==
1. "Krausemeyer's Alley"
2. "Krausemeyer's Christening"

February 26, 1912
Miner's Theatre – built by Henry Clay Miner (1842–1900)
312 8th Avenue, Manhattan
(northeast corner of 8th Avenue and West 27th Street)

- Philip Krausemeyer – Billy Watson
- Mike Grogan – Billy Spencer
- Hinkley – Charles Johnson
- Kitty Krausemeyer – Alice Gilbert
- Tommy Grogan – William J. McCabe
- Clarence Fitzpoodle – Ted Fletcher
- Doctor Cheatum – Martin Fletcher
- Lenora – Ruby Marion
- Beatrice – Ida Walling
- Mrs. Krausemeyer – Margaret Sheridan

Beef Trust: "Four thousand three hundred pounds of chorus:"

- Kitty Lucette
- Laura Glinserati
- Sadie Carroll
- Anna Golden
- Edith Mason
- May Irish
- Lulu Leslie (née Eva Smith; born 1854 – died September 27, 1929)
- May Cromwell
- Marian Macey
- Edna Purcell
- Ines Weber
- Maude Hamilton
- Amy Thompson
- Maude Barrett
- Marguerite Newell

Mike Grogan, a comedic and eccentric Irish character, was originally played by Billy Spencer. Philip Krausemeyer, a wealthy Jewish character, was played by Billy Watson.

== Selected Beef Trust members (not mentioned above) ==
- Lulu Shanley
- Lillian Smith
- Kitty Dayton
- Loretta Claxton
- Dolly Gordon
- Carrye Bernard
- Grace Sachs
- Billy Barry
- Lily Healy
- Harriett Murray
- Rhea Hill
- Mamie Howe
- Mabelle Reid
- May Wagner
- Florence Cooke
- Edith Ager
- Hazel Langley
