= Walter L. Main =

American circus proprietor (1862–1950)

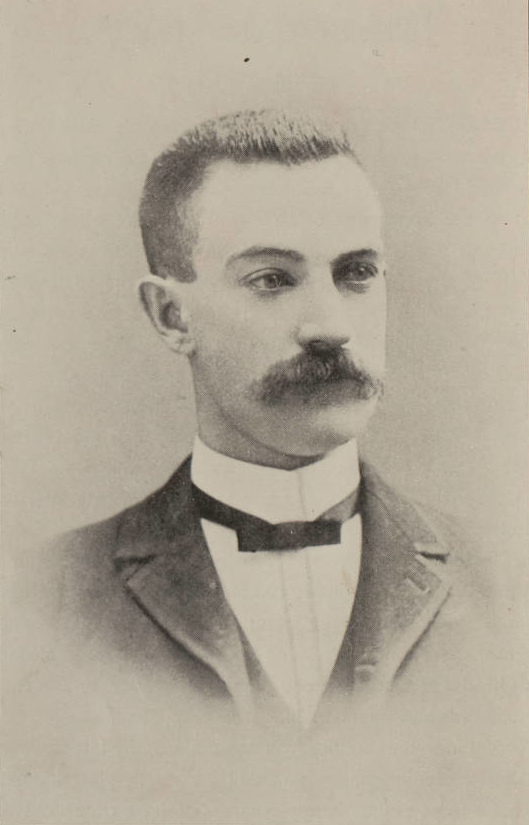
- Born: Walter L. Main; July 13, 1862; Medina County, Ohio, U.S.
- Died: November 29, 1950 (age 88); U.S.
- Resting place: Union Dale Cemetery
- Occupation: Circus proprietor

Walter L. Main (July 13, 1862 – November 29, 1950) was an American showman and circus proprietor.

== Early life ==
Main was born on July 13, 1862, in Medina County, Ohio, United States.

== Career ==
Walter Main began his circus career in 1867 at the age of five. He worked as a bill passer for his father William Main's show and had become an advance agent by 1872.

He went on to take charge of the small circus his father had purchased. The circus, created in Trumbull County, Ohio, began with three trained horses from his father, two pigs, four ponies leased from C. G. Philips of Cortland, Ohio, five hay-rack wagons, equipment from a local livery yard, and a single-pole tent.

He was general agent for the Great Sargeant Show from 1881 to 1883, earning $50 monthly plus expenses, then joined Hillard's (England's Greatest) Show, touring America.

Back in Ohio for the winter of 1884, he negotiated with showmen for a stake in their shows but, unable to reach terms, began his own venture that July. Walter L. Main founded his own circus in 1885. His performances took place at fairs and local gatherings, saving money by using existing crowds instead of drawing them into town. His county fair circus earned enough to expand to twenty-six horses, then to forty in 1887, though returns were smaller. He expanded his show in 1888 to seventy horses, introduced an elephant and menagerie, and made thousands in profit. With surplus cash he invested in reliable railroad stocks.

In 1890, he increased to ninety horses, making it the largest wagon show of its time, with profits nearly double the prior year. A few years after founding his wagon show, he sold the equipment to the Scribner & Smith Circus. In 1891, he expanded to rail, purchasing eleven railroad cars to meet the needs of his growing show and launching his first railroad tour.

During 1892 he grew the show to eighteen cars and another elephant, touring the Western States east of the Rockies. Financially successful, the season also marked his profitable investment in Arkansas timber, where he later controlled sixty thousand acres. His stock farm, established in 1889 with steam-heated stone and iron animal houses, was already extensive, but the growing menagerie at the end of the 1892 season required further expansion.

He was involved in the tragic Walter L. Main Circus train wreck of 1893. The train wreck near Tyrone, Pennsylvania claimed the lives of eleven of Main's performers and numerous animals. Main's financial loss from the wreck exceeded $80,000. He was back on the road by the next spring.

In 1897, he traveled to Europe, where in Liverpool he and his agents visited leading menageries, zoological gardens, and circuses. He contracted superior acts at prices few competitors dared to offer. The following 1898 season opened with an abundance of attractions, though some cost him thousands each week. The expense, however, did not trouble him.

He ceased managing circuses himself in 1904 but continued to lease his name, notably to Andrew Downie from 1918 to 1924, Floyd and Howard King from 1925 to 1928, and others from 1930 to 1937.

Main, who founded the Circus Friends of America for circus fans, ended his career in 1937.

== Personal life ==
Main married Louise K. Schneider, and the couple alternated their residence between the Main farm near Geneva, Ohio, and the Schneider house.

== Death ==
Main died on November 29, 1950, in the United States. He was buried in the Union Dale Cemetery in Pittsburgh.

== Legacy ==
His show was once ranked alongside the Ringling Brothers and Barnum & Bailey, with his career lasting over fifty years.
