= Haskell Harr =

American musician (1894–1986)

Haskell Warren Harr (June 27, 1894 – September 24, 1986) was an American percussionist, composer, and bandleader. He was active for over sixty years in various fields of music, from playing in vaudeville radio shows, directing military bands, and serving as the inaugural professor of percussion at the VanderCook College of Music. He is best known for his method books, particularly Drum Method which was published in two volumes in the late 1930s. His method books have been used by several notable percussionists, including Steve Reich and Terry Bozzio.

== Biography ==
Harr was born in Baraboo, Wisconsin to Warren and Attie Harr. In 1906, at the age of twelve, he began to perform in local dance bands and pit orchestras on cornet and saxophone, the most significant of these being the White Hussars under Al Sweet. In 1911, he joined the Goldman Band as a drummer and xylophonist. In the 1920s, he began the Haskell Novelty Trio made up of xylophone, piano, and a woodwind doubler which played on local radio stations. Seeking to improve his xylophone skills, Harr later took lessons from Roy Knapp and George Hamilton Green. In 1933, during the Chicago World's Fair, he played in the backing band for Sally Rand.

From 1934 to 1941, Harr served as the band director for the Glenwood School for Boys in Glenwood, Illinois. Afterward, he joined the Army as a chief warrant officer and directed the 33rd Division Field Artillery and the 122nd Field Artillery Regiment bands. After the war, Harr resumed teaching in local school districts, such as for Harvey School District 152, and was often brought in as a clinician for bands around the country. In 1952, Harr received his bachelor's degree from VanderCook. While, he had already been an educator at VanderCook beginning in 1930, the degree allowed him to become an associate professor. While there, he began its first percussion program and received an honorary doctorate from the college for his work. After retiring from teaching full-time, Harr became the educational director for the Slingerland Drum Company.

Harr was inducted as an inaugural member into the Percussive Arts Society Hall of Fame in 1972.
