= Columbia Theatre (New York City) =

Former theater in Manhattan, New York

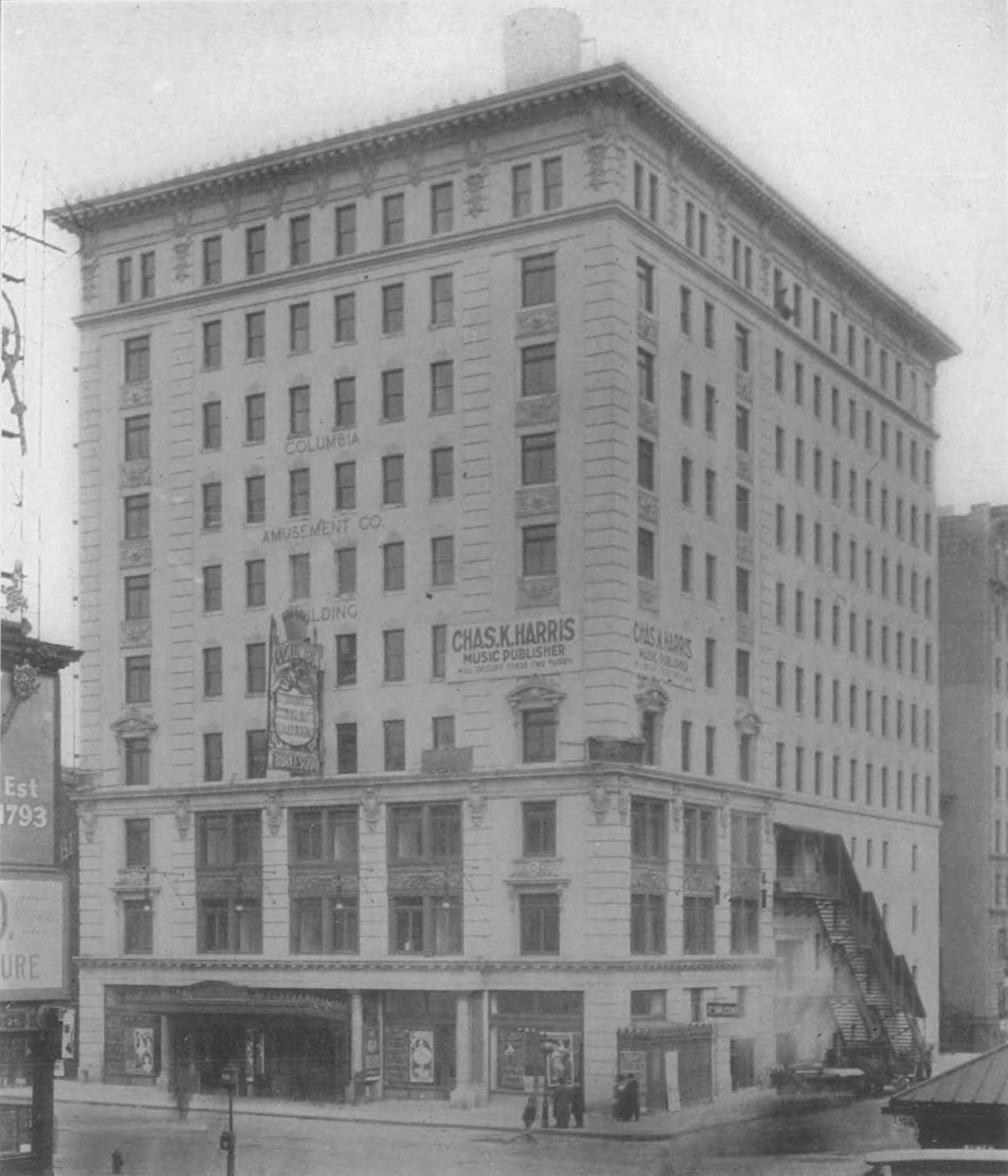
- Columbia Amusement Company Building and Columbia Theatre in 1910
- Interactive map of Columbia Theatre
- Address: 701 Seventh Avenue, Manhattan, New York; New York City; United States
- Coordinates: 40.759237°N 73.984139°W
- Owner: Columbia Amusement Company
- Capacity: 1,385 seats

Construction
- Opened: January 10, 1910
- Closed: 1928
- Demolished: 2013
- Architect: William H. McElfatrick

The Columbia Theatre was an American burlesque theater on Seventh Avenue at the north end of Times Square in Midtown Manhattan, New York City. Operated by the Columbia Amusement Company between 1910 and 1927, it specialized in "clean", family-oriented burlesque, similar to vaudeville. Many stars of the legitimate theater or of films were discovered at the Columbia. With loss of audiences to cinema and stock burlesque, the owners began to offer slightly more risqué material from 1925. The theater was closed in 1927, renovated and reopened in 1930 as a cinema called the Mayfair Theatre. It went through various subsequent changes and was later renamed the DeMille Theatre. Nothing is left of the theater.

== Building ==
What would be called the "Home of Burlesque De Luxe" was built on the northeast corner of Seventh Avenue and 47th Street in Manhattan. A photograph from May 1909 before construction began shows the site was occupied by typical four- and five-story brownstone buildings. Construction by the Thompson–Starrett Co. took seven months from the start of demolition to completion of the job. The building had ten stories above ground and was 39 metres (128 ft) high. It held the headquarters of the Columbia Amusement Company, or Columbia Circuit, one of the largest of the burlesque circuits.

The theater was designed by William H. McElfatrick and had a capacity of 1,385. It occupied the ground floors of the new office building. The decor was a form of Beaux Arts. There was a mural painted by Arthur Thomas above the proscenium arch called "The Goddesses of the Arts." There were two balconies, as was common with theaters designed by McElfatrick. The theater was one of the first to have a ventilation system that partially cleaned the air of tobacco smoke.

== Opening ==
The Columbia Amusement Company opened the Columbia Theatre on January 10, 1910. The opening was well publicized and was attended by various dignitaries. The opening was also attended by actors and managers from the worlds of vaudeville and legitimate theater. The Columbia Circuit was a leader in offering clean burlesque, family-style entertainment that resembled vaudeville. The main difference was that burlesque shows had an overall theme, a carry-over from the old minstrel show format, while vaudeville was a series of unconnected individual acts.

The Columbia Theatre became the circuit's flagship, and has been called a "temple to clean burlesque". Despite this, not long after opening the Columbia was criticized because women in flesh-colored tights had appeared on stage. The critic George Jean Nathan was also unimpressed, but for the opposite reason. Writing of another theater, he said, "Unlike the affectedly tony Columbia Theatre uptown, the Olympic remains true to first principles and devotes itself not, as in the case of the Columbia, to fifth-rate imitations of third-rate Broadway music shows, but to pure, unadulterated and heart-warming old knock 'em down and drag 'em out burlesque..."

== Shows ==
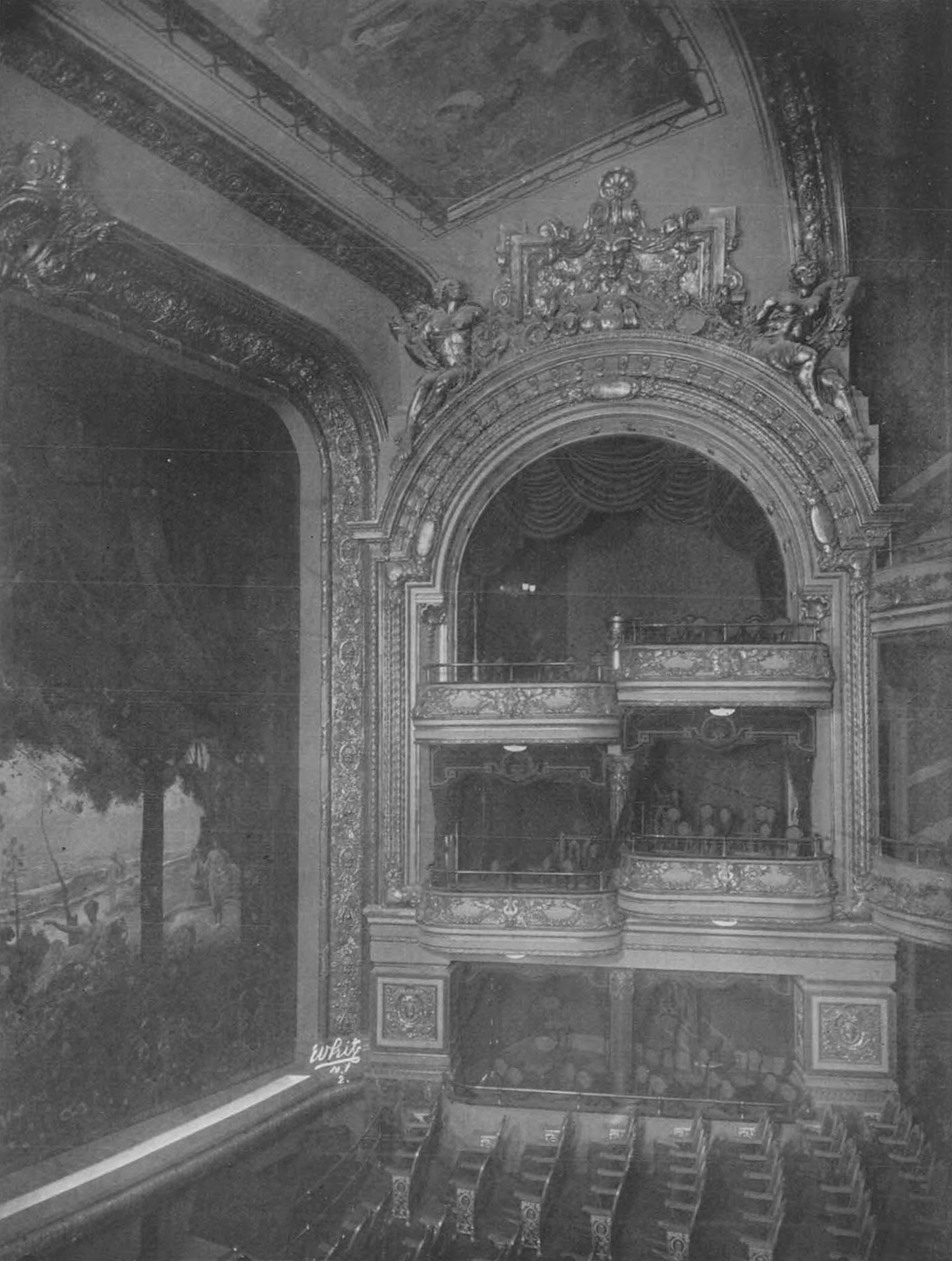
Interior of the theater in 1910

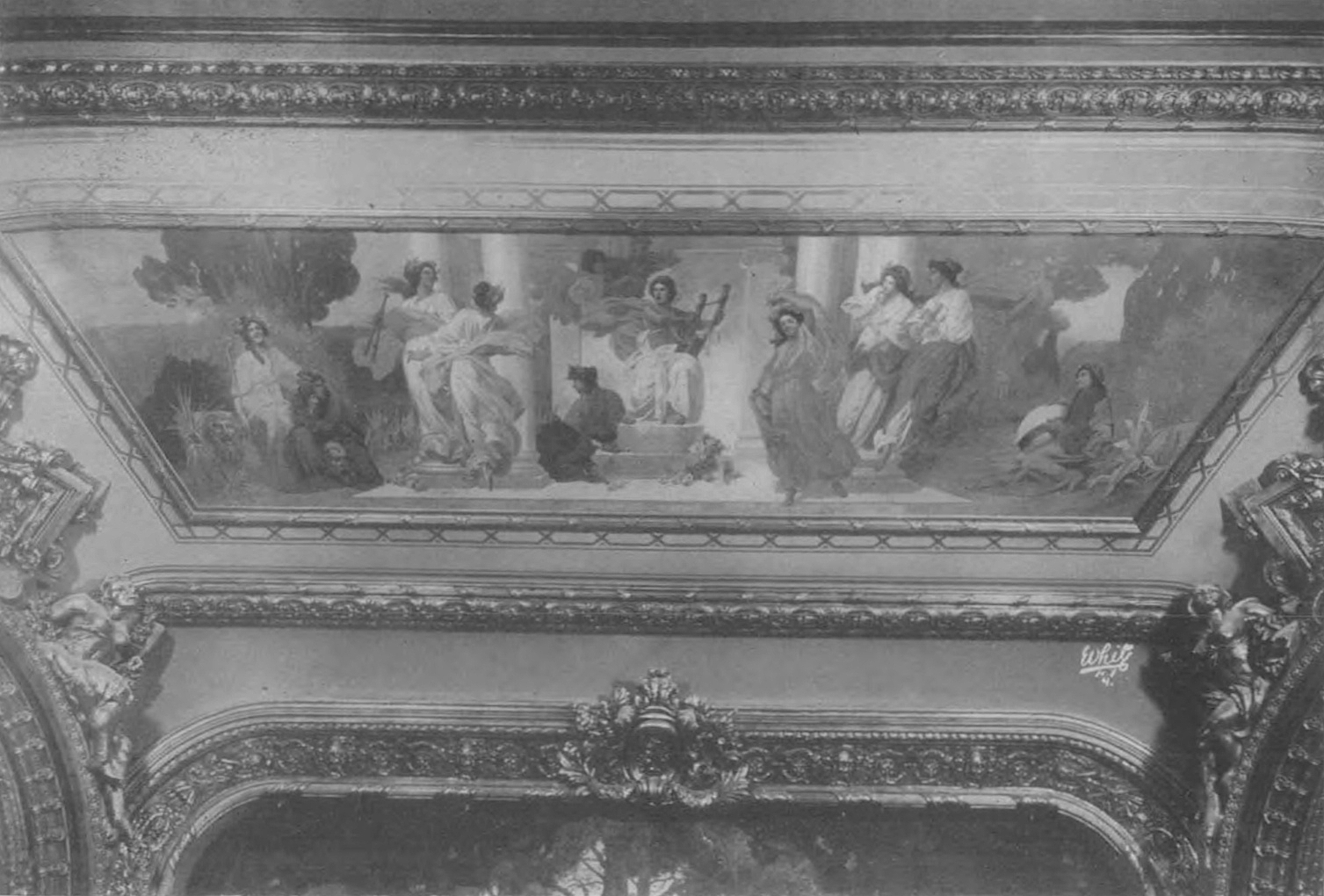
Ceiling mural of "The Goddesses of the Arts"

The musical comedy College Girl was staged at the Columbia in 1910. Fanny Brice was one of the stars, and was noticed by Florenz Ziegfeld, Jr. He managed to get her freed of her contract so she could appear in the 1910 Follies. The theater's managers, Cliff Gordon and Robert North, decided to put on an adaptation of The Merry Whirl for the summer of 1911. The show had been on the road for several months. The Broadway version had "sixteen chorus girls, eight 'ponies' and four 'show' girls, also six chorus men to give them strength." All wore elaborate costumes. Alexander's Ragtime Band by Irving Berlin, sung by James C. Morton and Frank F. Moore, was the hit song of the show.

Will Rogers appeared at the theater, performing his rope tricks. Joe E. Brown, a comedian, was playing in the Columbia Theatre in 1918 when he was spotted by Henry Cort and offered a part in the successful Broadway show Listen, Lester. This launched Brown's career on the legitimate stage. Clark and McCullough, former vaudeville players, opened as burlesque stars in Puss Puss at the Columbia on December 9, 1918. In 1920 James E. Cooper produced Folly Town, a burlesque show that was one of the first racially integrated productions in New York. A clean burlesque, it featured the colored Tennessee Ten with Florence Mills and the comedians Bert Lahr and Jack Haley. It cost over $20,000 to produce, a huge amount for that period, and opened at the Columbia Theatre. The show received enthusiastic reviews. In June 1920 the Burlesque Club held its annual benefit at the Columbia Theatre, again featuring the Tennessee Ten.

Jimmie Cooper's Revue, with white and colored casts, opened at the Columbia on December 10, 1923. The white players performed in part 1, and the colored players in part 2. A reviewer said of the second part, "We have never seen anything as yet in burlesque to equal the act of these performers, individually or collectively. Furthermore, it was the best dressed colored act that we have seen on any stage. Each and every turn was well applauded. Will Rogers performed at the theater in the Red Pepper Review, a tribute to the Columbia Burlesque Circuit, on January 8, 1925. An African-American troupe opened at the Columbia in July 1925, including a jazz band featuring the clarinetist Sidney Bechet. Other players were Jerome Don Pasquall and Wellman Braud. Lucky Sambo (1925) was another production with an African-American cast that was popular with white audiences.

By the mid-1920s cinemas were providing shows that combined film and live entertainment with ticket prices lower than any burlesque show. In the 1925 season Columbia's president, Sam A. Scribner, authorized the removal of tights and display of tableaux of bare-breasted women. Columbia continued to lose customers to other types of entertainment and to more explicit stock burlesque theaters. The Columbia Theatre closed in 1927.

== Later history ==
The theater was sold to Walter Reade in 1928 for conversion into a cinema. The architect Thomas W. Lamb replaced the two original balconies with a single balcony, and renovated the auditorium in Art Deco style. In October 1930 the cinema opened as the Mayfair Theatre, operated by RKO Pictures. Brandt Theatres was running the theater by 1950. In the early 1960s it was renamed the DeMille Theatre, and became a venue for viewing premium 70mm films with reserved seating. In 1976 the theater was split into three separate and very narrow cinemas, and was known as the Embassy 2-3-4 Theatre until 1997, and then the Embassy 1-2-3 Theatre until finally closing in the early 2000s. In 2007 the theater was converted into a restaurant. By May 2013 this had also closed. The theater had been completely gutted so the site could be cleared. A skyscraper at 20 Times Square was built on the site and was completed in 2019.

== Sources ==
- "701 Seventh Avenue". Emporis.
- Allen, Robert Clyde (1991). Horrible Prettiness: Burlesque and American Culture. Univ of North Carolina Press. ISBN 978-0-8078-4316-1.
- Bockmann, Rich (December 9, 2019). "Lender forecloses on Maefield's billion-dollar Times Square project". The Real Deal.
- Chilton, John (1996). Sidney Bechet: The Wizard of Jazz. Da Capo Press. ISBN 978-0-306-80678-0.
- "Columbia Theater". New York Tours by Gary. August 31, 2013.
- "Columbia Theatre". Museum of the City of New York.
- Corio, Ann; DiMona, Joseph (May 1, 2012). This Was Burlesque. Premier Digital Publishing. ISBN 978-1-937957-72-8.
- Egan, Bill (January 1, 2004). Florence Mills: Harlem Jazz Queen. Scarecrow Press. p. 50. ISBN 978-0-8108-5007-1.
- Gabel, William (2013). "Embassy 1,2,3 Theatre". Cinema Treasures.
- Gewirtz, Arthur; Kolb, James J. (2004). Art, Glitter, and Glitz: Mainstream Playwrights and Popular Theatre in 1920s America. Greenwood Publishing Group. ISBN 978-0-313-32467-3.
- Goldman, Herbert G. (1992). Fanny Brice. Oxford University Press. p. 41. ISBN 978-0-19-535901-5.
- Hamm, Charles (January 31, 1997). Irving Berlin: Songs from the Melting Pot: The Formative Years, 1907-1914. Oxford University Press. p. 125. ISBN 978-0-19-536114-8.
- Hanson, Nils (September 1, 2011). Lillian Lorraine: The Life and Times of a Ziegfeld Diva. McFarland. ISBN 978-0-7864-8935-0.
- Lemke, Sieglinde (March 31, 1998). Primitivist Modernism : Black Culture and the Origins of Transatlantic Modernism. Oxford University Press. ISBN 978-0-19-534454-7.
- Nathan, George Jean (1971). Materia, Critica: New Introd. by Charles Angoff. Fairleigh Dickinson Univ Press. ISBN 978-0-8386-7966-1.
- Robinson, Ray (March 21, 1996). American Original : A Life of Will Rogers. Oxford University Press, USA. p. 65. ISBN 978-0-19-535866-7.
- Rogers, Will (September 28, 2005). The Papers of Will Rogers: From the Broadway stage to the national stage, September 1915-July 1928. University of Oklahoma Press. ISBN 978-0-8061-3704-9.
- Sampson, Henry T. (October 30, 2013). Blacks in Blackface: A Sourcebook on Early Black Musical Shows. Scarecrow Press. ISBN 978-0-8108-8351-2.
- Slide, Anthony (January 1, 1998). Eccentrics of Comedy. Scarecrow Press. ISBN 978-0-8108-3534-4.
- Taylor, William R. (November 26, 1991). Inventing Times Square: Commerce and Culture at the Crossroads of the World. Russell Sage Foundation. ISBN 978-1-61044-527-6.
- "Thompson-Starret company (ad)". The New York Times. May 18, 1911. p. 4.
- Wagenknecht, Edward (1982). American Profile, 1900–1909. Univ of Massachusetts Press. p. 268. ISBN 0-87023-351-3.
