= Scribner & Smith's Circus =

Former American circus

Origin
- Country: United States
- Founder(s): Sam A. Scribner; Neil Smith
- Year founded: 1891

Information
- Fate: Folded in September 1896.

Scribner & Smith's Circus was an American circus run by Sam A. Scribner and Neil Smith that operated from 1891 to 1896.

== History ==
In 1891, the Scribner & Smith Circus purchased wagon show equipment formerly owned by Walter L. Main. At its founding, Sam A. Scribner served as the general manager of Scribner & Smith's Circus. Scribner had previously spent several years as assistant manager of the Walter L. Main Circus.

The circus traveled from town to town by road. It was often advertised as the "twenty-five cent circus."

During the early 1893 season, the Scribner & Smith Circus toured New Hampshire, where it was well received and consistently filled its tents. The company maintained 70 horses and a workforce of 79 divided between hotel accommodations and the circus lot.

Scribner & Smith's foreign agent, J. D. Harrison, bought "Bazal," a large elephant, from a trader in Tassisudon, Bhutan, India, in 1892. In May 1894, its new elephant, which was finally imported from India with the consent of a Maharaja, became a feature attraction. During the 1894 season, the Scribner & Smith Circus employed 250 people, 125 horses, and maintained 10 animal cages, three open dens, golden parade cars, and two bands.

Scribner & Smith's Circus gave Al Sweet his first role as bandmaster, which he held from 1895 until its closure in 1896.

In 1896, the circus employed 400 people, kept 200 horses, and featured 3 tableaux cars, 3 bands, and 15 animal cages, including baby lions. Several rare-animal cages had been obtained abroad by Scribner & Smith's agent at great expense, arriving on April 10. On May 29, 1896, Scribner & Smith's New United Shows staged a performance in Sunbury, Pennsylvania, featuring the popular Bazal the elephant, rare foreign animals, and acts by Willie Lowanda, Frank Cooper, and Danny O'Brian.

In September 1896, the Scribner & Smith Circus was stranded in Salem, Massachusetts, after falling behind on payments to equipment owner Charles Laure. The property, valued at $30,000 and including horses, wagons, tents, and exotic animals, was reclaimed, leaving about 100 circus employees unpaid.

Neil Smith, co-founder of the circus, died in 1900. The title was sold by Scribner to James A. Bailey of Barnum and Bailey, after which he entered the burlesque business. After retiring from the circus business, the veteran theatrical manager worked with Harry Williams of Pittsburgh's Williams Academy of Music to stage the Williams Traveling All-Star vaudeville shows.

== Notable performers ==
- Robert S. Stickney
- Emma Stickney
- William O. Dale, principal bareback rider
- Bazal, the giant elephant
- Willie Lowanda, champion bareback rider
- Frank Cooper, described as the world's greatest hurdle rider
- Danny O'Brian, celebrated as the champion leader of the world
- George Hartzell, principal clown

== Alternate names ==
- Scribner & Smith's New York circus
- Scribner & Smith's Grand United Shows
- Scribner & Smith's New United Shows
- Scribner and Smith's All New Enormous Combined Shows

== See also ==
- List of circuses and circus owners
