= Isidore Herk =

Burlesque manager (1882–1944)

Isidore H. Herk
- Born: 1882
- Died: 5 July 1944 (aged 61–62); New York City, US
- Occupation: Burlesque manager

Isidore H. Herk (or Isadore, Izzy; 1882 – 5 July 1944) was a burlesque manager who played a major role in the evolution of this entertainment before World War II. His show at the Gaiety Theatre, closed in 1941, was the last burlesque show on Broadway.

== Early years ==
Herk was born around 1880. Herk's first job was treasurer of the Valentine Theatre in Toledo, Ohio. He moved to Chicago and became the personal assistant of the producer Herman Fehr, head of the Empire burlesque circuit, or Western Wheel. In 1913 the Eastern and Western wheels were consolidated into the Columbia Amusement Company, headed by Samuel Scribner and Isidore Herk. The combined operation put on fairly clean shows, as had the Eastern Wheel. During World War I (1914–18) Hirk staged burlesque shows for the Empire circuit such as Pacemakers, which featured a game of strip poker played on stage. However, Herk was primarily a manager rather than a producer.

== American and Mutual wheels ==
In May 1915 the Columbia circuit transferred its No. 2 circuit, the former Western wheel, which had forty theaters and thirty-four touring companies, to a new subsidiary corporation called the American Burlesque Association, or American wheel. Gus Hill was named president of the new entity. Herk was put in charge of the American wheel, set up to provide an illusion of competition. The American wheel played raunchier shows than its owner, with runways, hootchy-kootchy dancers and risqué comedians. Herk pointed out that "We're not producing Sunday school shows." The American circuit faced competition from stock burlesque theaters like Minsky's Burlesque National Winter Garden, whose shows went farther than Columbia would allow, and had to close in 1922.

Herk wanted to move into the more respectable vaudeville. In April 1922 Herk left Columbia and joined with the Shubert Organization and E. Thomas Beatty to form the Affiliated Theatres Corporation, which would book Shubert Advanced Vaudeville. Faced with fierce competition from the B.F. Keith circuit, the Shuberts closed their vaudeville operation in February 1923. Herk was left bankrupt. He moved to the newly formed Mutual burlesque circuit, then to the American circuit, and when that closed down back to the Mutual circuit. At the Mutual Herk cut costs, paid low salaries and eliminated elaborate costumes and scenery. Performers for the Mutual wheel became the first to expose their breasts. Billboard said the Mutual "polluted public morals". Herk said it was not musical comedy, but was the "jazz of American entertainment." Herk claimed that these were "clean working class entertainments".

The Mutual grew fast. With headquarters in New York, it began to buy up Columbia theaters across the country. In a few years Herk built up the Mutual to fifty franchises. In 1925 Herk ordered the Mutual houses to not engage any black acts or companies. By the mid-1920s cinemas were providing shows that combined film and live entertainment with ticket prices lower than any burlesque show. Columbia and Mutual merged in 1927 to form the United Burlesque Association. By the 1927–28 season the combined circuit was struggling financially. In 1930–31 the combined wheel decided to revive clean burlesque. The experiment failed and the circuit closed. Despite its low costs, the Mutual could not survive the Great Depression.

== Burlesque on Broadway ==
In the 1930s Herk helped create the Burlesque Artists Association, a union. Around 1932 Herk rented the Central Theater on 42nd street, Manhattan, from the Shuberts. He was planning to open a burlesque house when he was bought out by the Minskys. In 1936 the police closed the burlesque show at the Gotham Theatre at 125th street in New York, the start of a move to clean up entertainment in New York.

On 1 May 1937 New York fourteen burlesque theaters were forced to close when their licenses were not renewed. Mayor Fiorello H. La Guardia said "This is the beginning of the end of incorporated filth." On 3 May 1937 Herk, then owner of the Gaiety Theatre in Times Square, proposed a compromise where the shows would be cleaned up. For a few years the three remained houses were allowed to run under a system of self-censorship. Herk's show at the Gaiety Theatre finally closed in 1941, marking the end of burlesque on Broadway.

== Wine, Women and Song ==
In 1942 Herk and the Shuberts co-produced a Broadway show called Wine, Women and Song, starring Jimmy Savo and Margie Hart. The show was advertised as a combination of vaudeville, burlesque and Broadway revue, and ran for seven weeks. The revue included striptease, which shocked some of the audiences. Wine, Women and Song was closed by court order in December 1942.

Herk was convicted of presenting an indecent show and sentenced to six months in prison. Herk was then aged 59, and was suffering from a heart condition. The Billboard commented that "...his show was certainly clean when compared to the really dirty burly shows that played New York for years. In fact, Wine Women and Song was hardly obscene—it was just plain dull." On 2 January 1943 Herk was released on bail so he could arrange a show similar to that for which he was convicted. The jury could then see the show in the surroundings in which it was presented, rather than rely on a verbal description. In the end, Herk was jailed for several months.

Isadore H. Herk died in Post Graduate Hospital, New York, on 5 July 1944. He was aged 61.
