= Court Square Theater =

Coordinates: 42.10089°N 72.58821°W

The Court Square Theater (CST) was a theater located at 11 Elm Street within Court Square in Springfield, Massachusetts. The theater was designed by architects J. B. McElfatrick and F. S. Newman, and built by the carpentry firm of L. H. Scott and the masonry firm of J.S. Sanderson & Company. It was built by at a cost of $150,000.00 which did not include the $75,000.00 cost of purchasing the land. Construction on the theater began in 1891.

Springfield businessman Dwight O. Gilmore, who notably served as Springfield's mayor in 1899-1900, was the founder and initial owner of the theater. The Court Square Theater opened on September 5, 1892. It remained active as one of Springfield's principal theaters until 1956 when it was demolished. The theater was used for stage productions until 1936 when E. M. Loew converted the theater into a movie house. At the time of its planned demolition, The New York Times described the building as a landmark structure in Springfield.

John Philip Sousa's operetta The Free Lance was given its world premiere at the CST in 1905.
