= Walter L. Main Circus train wreck =

1893 train wreck in Pennsylvania, U.S.

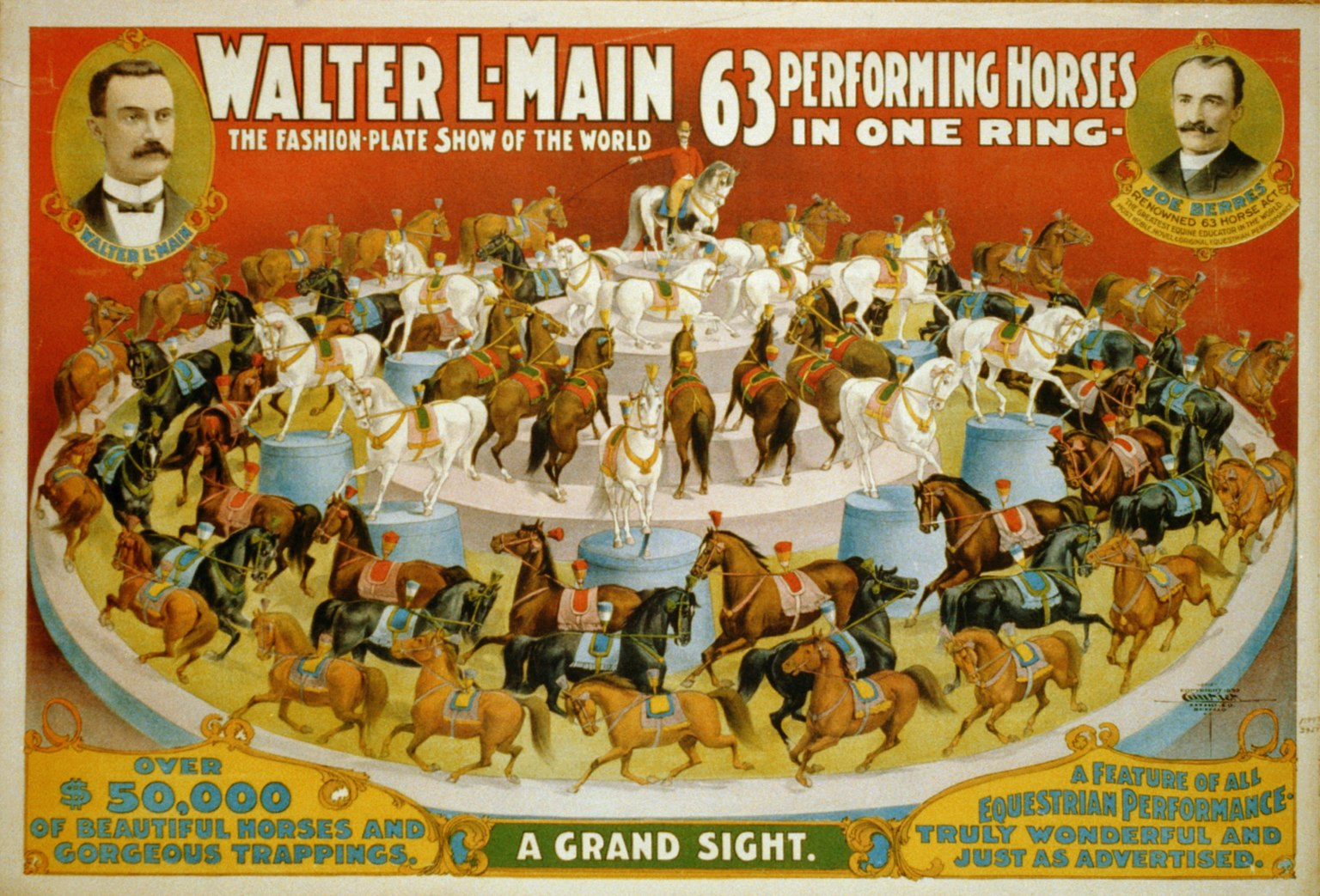
- Poster for the Walter L. Main Circus

Details
- Date: May 30, 1893; About 4:30 a.m.
- Location: Tyrone, Pennsylvania
- Coordinates: 40°42′22″N 78°12′42″W
- Incident type: Derailment
- Cause: Insufficient brake power

Statistics
- Trains: 1
- Vehicles: 17
- Deaths: 5
- Injured: 11

The Walter L. Main Circus train wreck was a train derailment that occurred in Tyrone, Pennsylvania, United States, in May 1893.

== Background ==
Walter L. Main was a farmer turned entrepreneur. William Main, Walter's father, was also a farmer as well as a horse trainer. By the beginning of the 1880s, Walter L. Main had created a circus using profits from selling off farm animals. It was not until 1886 that the circus became successful; when it did, it was officially established as the Walter L. Main Circus. By 1891, Main had purchased 11 railroad cars and was ready to tour the country.

The show itself included many animals including horses, tigers, snakes, and elephants. By the time of the accident, the length of the train had increased from 11 cars to 17. However, these passenger cars were much larger than the coal cars that the engine was initially intended to pull.

== Accident and aftermath ==
On the morning of Memorial Day, 1893, the train was traveling down an embankment near the town of Tyrone. The excess weight of the upgraded train cars proved to be too much for the train's brakes and it quickly lost control. At a curve, the train derailed, sparing only two sleeper cars. The brakeman, William Heverly, was killed instantly.

The ensuing crash resulted in the deaths of five circus employees and injuries to another 11. The casualties among the animals were far greater. Between 50 and 72 horses were either killed or injured. Some of the more exotic animals survived, such as the elephants, although they did sustain injuries in the crash. Those animals that were not injured escaped and roamed the Pennsylvania countryside. One woman, Hannah Friday, reported that when she was milking a cow, a Bengal tiger approached her. While she managed to escape, the tiger ate her cows.

Many of the larger escaped animals such as the lions, elephants, and panthers were recovered, but some animals such as the snakes were never located. In the months following the wreck, local residents reported seeing other unusual animals in the nearby wilderness, including exotic birds and kangaroos.

== Memorial ==
A marker has since been erected at the base of the hill where the train derailed. The wreck has been commemorated every year since 2009, with local residents placing wreaths and flowers at the site.

== See also ==
- Hammond Circus Train Wreck
