= Marlis Schweitzer =

Canadian theatre and performance historian

- Spouse: Dan Evans
- Children: 2

Academic background
- Education: BA, BFA., University of Victoria; PhD, 2005, University of Toronto
- Thesis: Becoming fashionable: actresses, fashion, and the development of American consumer culture, 1893-1919. (2005)

Academic work
- Institutions: York University

Marlis Erica Schweitzer (born 1975) is a Canadian theatre and performance historian. She is professor and Chair of the Department of Theatre at York University.

== Personal life ==
Schweitzer and her husband Dan have two children together.

== Career ==
After earning her PhD, Schweitzer accepted the Andrew W. Mellon Postdoctoral Fellow in the Humanities at the University of Pennsylvania. The following year, Schweitzer was the recipient of the 2007 Richard Plant Award from the Canadian Association for Theatre Research (CATR) for her article "Stepping on Stiletto: Kaleidoscope, CAPP, and Controversy." In 2009, Schweitzer published "When Broadway Was the Runway: Theater, Fashion, and American Culture" which was named Outstanding Academic Title by Choice: Current Reviews for Academic Libraries. The book, published through the University of Pennsylvania Press, examined consumer capitalism and the theater, department store, and fashion industries. The book would also go on to be a Freedley Award Finalist in 2010. During the following academic term, 2009–10, Schweitzer accepted a John W. Kluge Fellowship at the Library of Congress. This was followed by a short-term fellowship with the Folger Shakespeare Library.

From 2013 until 2016, Schweitzer was a general editor for Theatre Research in Canada. She left the journal in 2016 to accept a role as President of the Canadian Association for Theatre Research. From 2016 until 2018, Schweitzer served as president of the CATR. In her role as president, Schweitzer co-edited "Performance Studies in Canada" in 2017 with Laura Levin which was published through the McGill–Queen's University Press. This book would earn her the 2018 Patrick O'Neill Award from CATR. She also published "Transatlantic Broadway: The Infrastructural Politics of Global Performance" through Palgrave Macmillan. In her last year as president, she received a Social Sciences and Humanities Research Council of Canada grant to fund a two-day event supporting Playing with History: A Performance-Based Historiography Symposium. She also launched her own podcast called Scene Change.

In 2019, Schweitzer was elected a Member of the Royal Society of Canada College of New Scholars, Artists and Scientists. She also sat on the Cambridge University Press Prize committee board and was appointed editor of Theatre Survey, a theatre historical journal. As of 2019, Schweitzer is Chair of the Department of Theatre at York University.

== Selected publications ==
The following is a list of selected publications:

- When Broadway was the runway: theater, fashion, and American culture (2011)
- Transatlantic broadway: the infrastructural politics of global performance (2015)
- Performance studies in Canada (2017)
