= Al Sweet =

American composer and conductor (1876–1945)

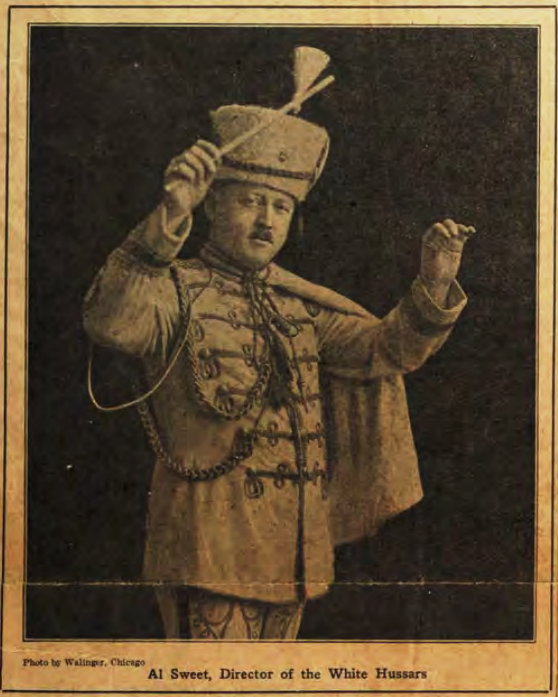
Al Sweet (c. 1921) wearing the distinctive uniform of the White Hussars

Albert C. Sweet (July 7, 1876 – May 12, 1945) was an American bandleader, cornetist, and composer. Over the course of his career, Sweet served as music director and soloist for the Edison Phonograph Company, bandmaster of the Ringling Brothers Circus, and eventually founded his own band, The White Hussars. Sweet and his band were an important part of the Chautauqua movement (in which touring ensembles made up of entertainers and noted speakers ventured from town to town) eventually earning him the moniker "Mr. Chautauqua".

== Life and career ==
Sweet was born in Dansville, New York, to a musical family. His father was a violinist and his mother was a pianist. After starting on violin and taking lessons from his father, Sweet later picked up the E♭ cornet at the age of 8 and joined the town silver band. He first played professionally at the age of 14 for a year-long stint with the Stowe Brothers Circus band in 1890. At the urging of their bandleader, Monty Long, he switched to the B♭ cornet, which would become his instrument of choice.

For the next few years, Sweet traveled across the country by boxcar, working various jobs and playing for several different bands. He eventually arrived in New York City where he met famed cornetist William Paris Chambers. Viewing Sweet as a prodigy, Chambers offered him lessons at no cost. In 1895, Sweet earned his first position as a bandmaster for the Scribner & Smith's Circus until it folded the next year. He then joined the Edison Phonograph Company to become one of their musical directors, working with the company as an arranger and soloist from 1899 to 1904. His past experience as a circus bandmaster led him to be scouted for the position at the Ringling Bros. Circus to replace an aging George Ganweiler in 1906. During his tenure there, he wrote perhaps his most popular work, "Ringling Brothers Grand Entry", which was published in 1911.

Just prior to World War I, he left Ringling Bros. and founded his own band, the White Hussars, noted for their flashy, militaristic white uniforms outlined with gold trim inspired by the namesake European light cavalry. Each bandsman was as equally capable of a singer and the group often sang a cappella arrangements leading to the ensemble being promoted as a "singing band". They were eventually endorsed by Chicago producer Ralph Dunbar who took over as their booking agent, leading to the band being billed in the press as "Dunbar's White Hussars". The band was a popular touring group, playing in local vaudeville shows and the Chautauqua circuits. Dunbar capitalized on this popularity and devised other Hussar ensembles such as the "Red Hussars" and "Black Hussars".

The last major concert the White Hussars are noted to have played was for the Chicago World's Fair of 1933. During the later years of his life, Sweet took up conducting bands in the local area around Chicago. He died on May 12, 1945, at the age of 68 due to a heart attack.

== See also ==
- Haskell Harr, a member of the White Hussars
