= Sam A. Scribner =

American businessman (1859–1941)

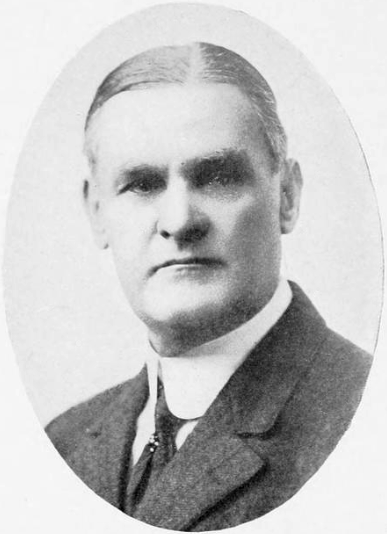
- c. 1914
- Born: Samuel Alexander Scribner; August 18, 1859; Brookville, Pennsylvania, US
- Died: July 8, 1941 (aged 81); Bronxville, New York, US
- Occupation: Burlesque entrepreneur
- Known for: Columbia Amusement Company

Sam A. Scribner (August 18, 1859 – July 8, 1941) was an American circus and burlesque impresario of the late nineteenth and early twentieth centuries. He operated the Columbia Amusement Company, presenting forty or more family-entertainment burlesque shows simultaneously in theaters throughout the Northeast and Midwest of the United States.

== Biography ==
=== Early years ===
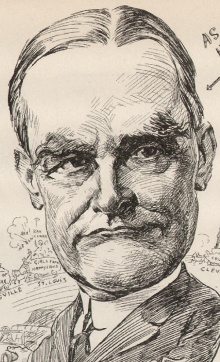
Caricature from a 1911 magazine

Samuel A. Scribner, son of Alexander St. John Scribner and Cynthia Cheseboro Scribner, was born August 18, 1859, near Brookville, Pennsylvania, county seat of Jefferson County. Serving as a tuba player in the village band, Scribner spent his whole life in show business. In the summer of 1879 he joined a small circus called, rather grandly, Rogers and Campbell United Aggregation and Grand Equestriculum Hippo Comique. For nearly twenty years he worked his way up the ranks of various circuses, traveling by mule train six days a week, six months a year. By 1892, he partnered with Neil Smith to operate Scribner & Smith's All New Enormous Combined Shows. During the winter months, he acted in and produced melodramas in various theater companies in the United States and Canada. In the late 1890s, he sold his circus to Barnum & Bailey and switched to burlesque.

=== Columbia Amusement ===
In 1902, Scribner and his partner, John Herbert Mack, formed the Columbia Amusement Company, also known as the "Columbia Wheel" or "Eastern Wheel". With a season running from Fall to Spring, Columbia would present forty or more separate shows in forty different theaters. Each week each show would travel from one theater to the next, rotating around the American Northeast and Midwest like forty spokes on a great wheel.

On January 3, 1910, the company opened its flagship theater in Times Square, at the north-east corner of Seventh Avenue and 47th Street. In its time, Columbia Amusement ruled American burlesque, and Scribner, its imperious operator, was determined to make burlesque both clean and profitable. In 1913 the Eastern wheel and the rival Western wheel were consolidated into the Columbia Amusement Company, headed by Scribner and Isidore Herk. The combined operation put on fairly clean shows, as had the Eastern Wheel.

One of Scribner's early hires at Columbia was Will Rogers. In 1904, Rogers was working the roof of Willie Hammerstein's theater in New York. Scribner hired him away, raising his salary from $140 to $250 per week. On January 3, 1925, in anticipation of the Fifteenth Anniversary Gala of the Columbia Theater in New York, Rogers sent a telegram stating: "I will be there Wednesday night for you to do an act announce the acts take tickets or sweep out for you I said for you Sam Scribner."

=== Family life ===
Scribner married Henrietta "Etta" Cuerbo on April 4, 1907, in New York City. They had three children, Dorothy Scribner (1910-1977), Samuel Alexander Scribner (1913-2003), and John Herbert Mack Scribner (1917-2009). Peter Scribner, the son of Samuel Alexander Scribner, is his grandson.
