= Al Reeves =

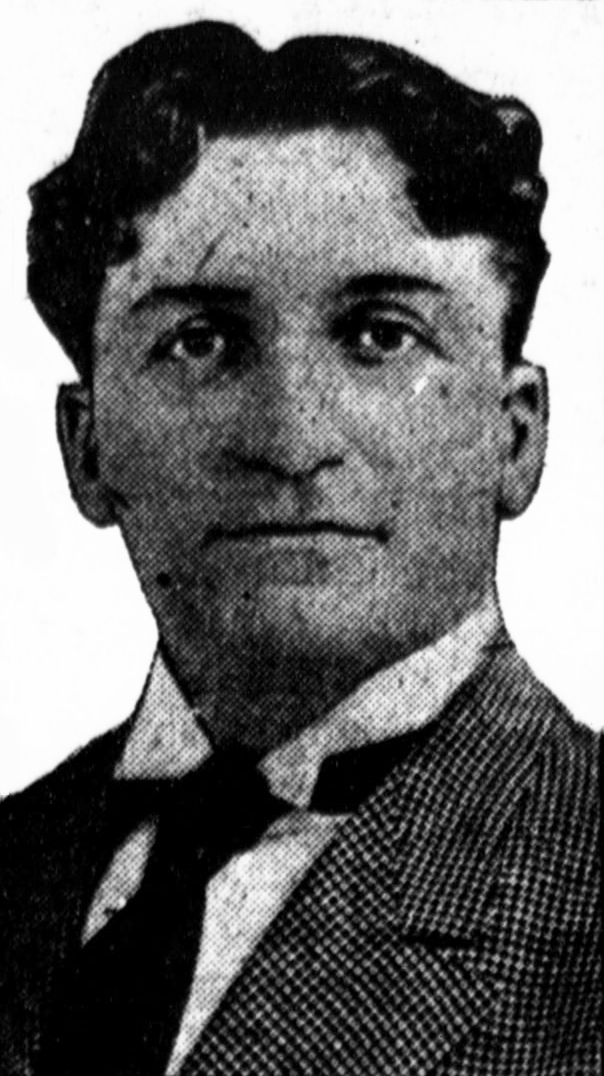
- Born: Alfred Henry Reeves; May 31, 1864; Manhattan, New York, U.S.
- Died: February 26, 1940 (aged 75); Brooklyn, New York, U.S.
- Occupations: Vaudeville Entertainer, Vocalist, Banjo Player
- Years active: 1878-1940

Al Reeves (May 31, 1864 – February 26, 1940) was an American vaudeville and minstrel show entertainer, vocalist, and banjo player.

Catch phrase: "Give me credit, boys."

He began performing in 1878, and was heavily involved in the burlesque scene. He later toured with his own company, Al Reeves' Specialty Co. and produced his famous "Big Beauty Show" ("99% Girls 99%") which bragged packed houses for twenty years. He was later known as the "King of Burlesque."

Reeves made his only known recordings with Columbia Records and Edison Records from 1891 and 1893, and around the same time had an inadvertent influence on the young Al Jolson's interest in show business.

Vaudeville performers the Griffin Sisters worked for Reeves early in their career.
