= Columbia Amusement Company =

U.S. burlesque production company

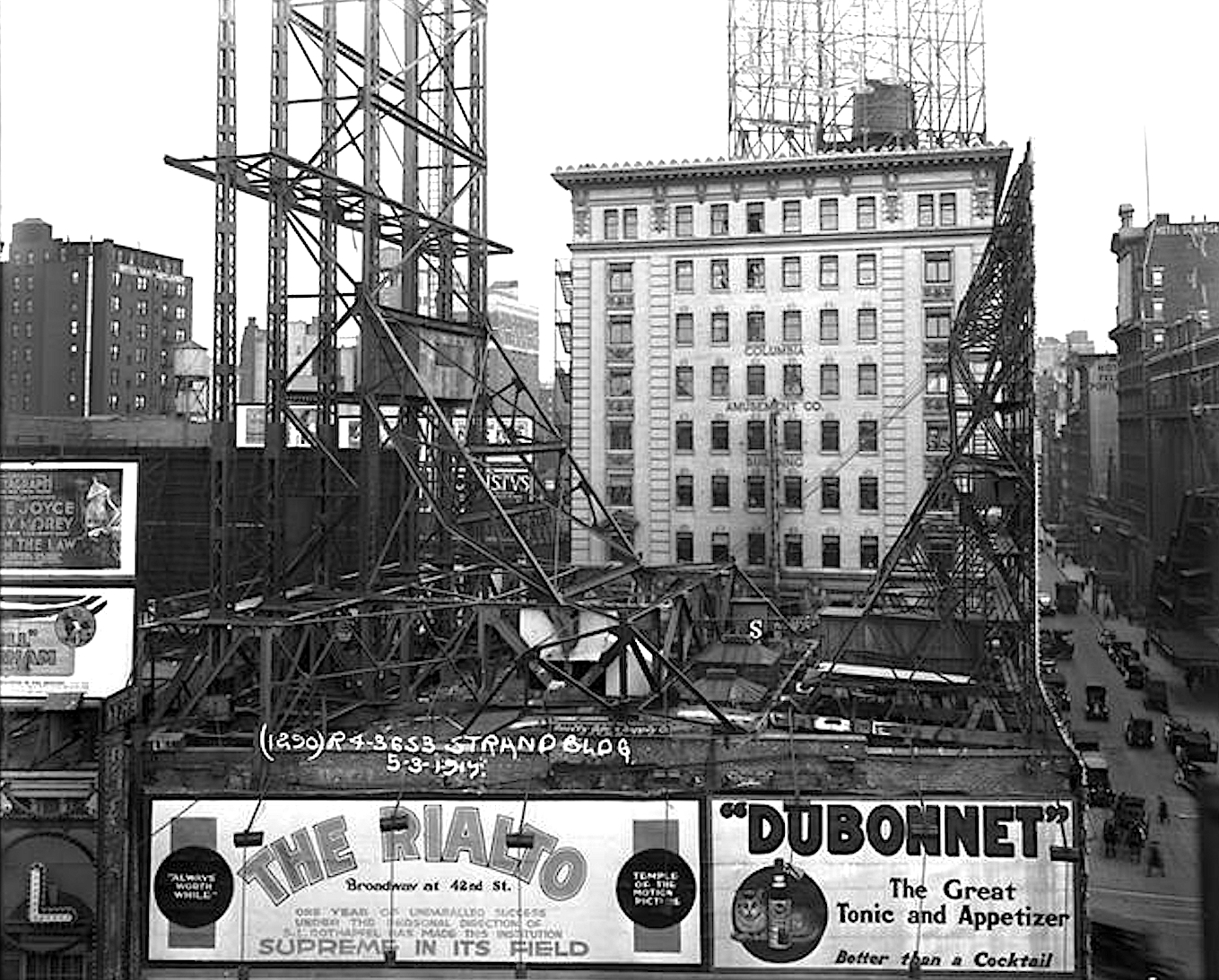
- Columbia Amusement Co. Building, Manhattan, in 1917
- Formation: 12 July 1902; 124 years ago
- Dissolved: 1927; 99 years ago
- Legal status: Corporation
- Purpose: Burlesque production company
- Region served: United States and Canada
- Official language: English
- Leader: Samuel A. Scribner
- Subsidiaries: American Burlesque Association

The Columbia Amusement Company, also called the Columbia Wheel or the Eastern Burlesque Wheel, was a show business organization that produced burlesque shows in the United States between 1902 and 1927. Each year, between three and four dozen Columbia burlesque companies would travel in succession round a "wheel" of theaters, ensuring steady employment for performers and a steady supply of new shows for participating theaters. For much of its history the Columbia Wheel promoted relatively "clean" variety shows featuring comedians and pretty girls. Eventually the wheel was forced out of business due to changing tastes and competition from its one-time subsidiary and eventual rival, the Mutual Burlesque Association, as well as cinemas and cruder stock burlesque companies.

== Background ==
Following the lead of legitimate theater owners and vaudeville producers who organized to provide the public with quality acts and theaters with a steady stream of product, burlesque producers and theater managers in 1897 incorporated the Traveling Variety Managers of America (TVMA). The concept, credited to Gus Hill, was to mount approved burlesque shows that would progress from one theater to another in succession, as though around a "wheel". Burlesque performers would be guaranteed months of work, and theaters would not have to create or compete for shows.

== Formation ==
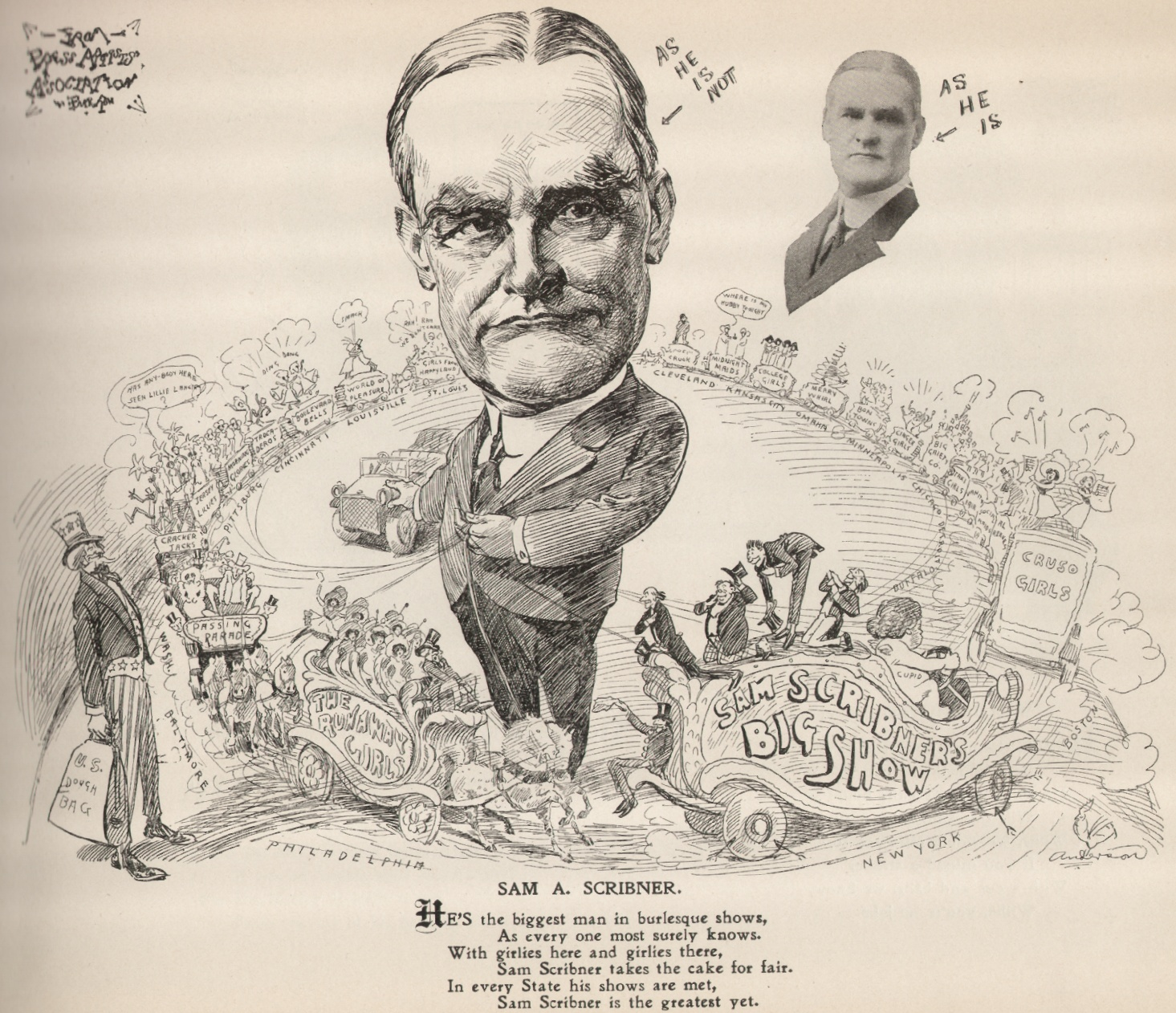
1911 cartoon depicting Sam A. Scribner and the Columbia Wheel

The TVMA soon split into two wheels, the Empire in the west and the Columbia in the east. Sixteen managers and producers incorporated the Columbia Amusement Company on 12 July 1902 with Sam A. Scribner at the head and with principals William S. Campbell, William S. Drew, Gus Hill, John Herbert Mack, Harry Morris, L. Lawrence Weber and A. H. Woodhill. Headquartered in New York, the Columbia circuit included theaters in large cities east of the Missouri and north of the Ohio, such as Washington, D.C., Philadelphia, New York, Pittsburgh, and Cleveland, as well as Toronto and Boston. Since the theaters were in the east, the Columbia Wheel was also known as the Eastern Wheel.

== Early years ==
The Columbia organizers aimed to provide affordable shows that were acceptable to women as well as men. They advertised "clean" or "refined" burlesque. Shows had multi-act programs that included comedians, skits and variety acts and chorus girls. In August 1905 Will Rogers signed with Columbia for five one-week shows in Brooklyn, New York, Buffalo, Cleveland and Pittsburgh. In 1908 the company acquired the Murray Hill Theatre on Lexington Avenue.

Although the wheel system made the industry more stable, the shows became standardized and repetitive. New costumes and acts were expensive, and when performers became better known they often left burlesque for the legitimate theater. Performers who worked in Columbia shows included Bert Lahr, Rose Sydell, Sophie Tucker, Fanny Brice, Leon Errol, Jean Bedini, and Bobby Clark and Paul McCullough. Many of them graduated to musical comedy or Broadway as soon as they could. But as long as audiences came to see the girls burlesque remained profitable.

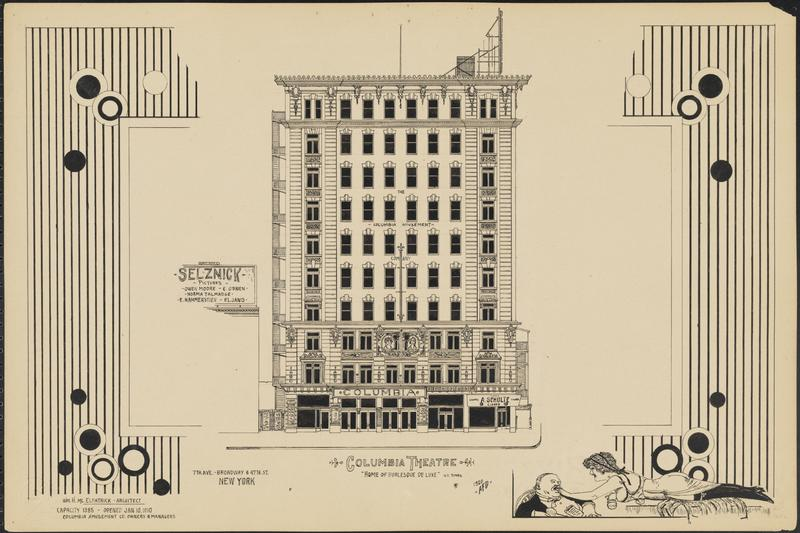
Columbia Theatre at Broadway & 47th in 1920, "Home of Burlesque De Luxe"

The Star and Garter opened in Chicago in 1908, providing "Clean Entertainment for Self-Respecting People". On 10 January 1910 the Columbia Amusement Company opened its flagship Columbia Theatre, "Home of Burlesque De Luxe", at Broadway and 47th Street in Manhattan. It was housed in the lower three floors of the Columbia Amusement Company's building. The theater, owned and operated by Columbia, was designed by William H. McElfatrick and had a capacity of 1,385. The theater was The opening of the theatre was well publicized and was attended by various dignitaries.

== Evolution ==
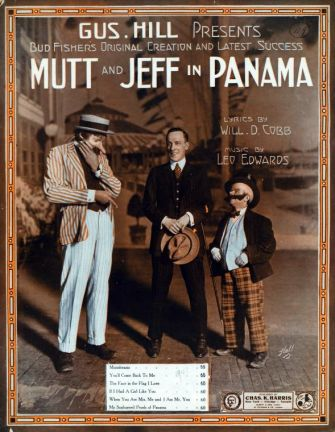
Sheet music cover for Gus Hill's Mutt and Jeff in Panama. After "cartoon theatricals" like this finished their run in vaudeville they often moved to Hill's burlesque franchises.

Under Scribner's leadership, Columbia put on respectable shows. Meanwhile, the Empire Wheel, headed by Isidore Herk, pushed the legal limits. Columbia responded by sometimes lowering its standards, especially in cities where the two wheels competed directly. In 1913 the two wheels were consolidated into the Columbia Wheel, and Scribner and Herk put on fairly clean shows.

Another independent wheel, the Progressive, filled the void left by the Empire Wheel.

In 1914 Columbia launched its "No.2" circuit to compete with the cheaper shows offered by the Progressive Wheel and local stock burlesque companies. The following year, Columbia's No.2 circuit absorbed the Progressive wheel and the subsidiary circuit was spun off as the American Wheel, keeping Columbia's brand clean. Gus Hill was named president of the new entity and drove competitors out of business.

While tastes were changing after World War I, Scribner still insisted on keeping Columbia shows comparatively clean. Although the American Wheel offered cooch dancers and runways, Columbia avoided runways until its final years. Scribner, who banned smoking in Columbia circuit theaters, also tried to ban the comedians from using double entendres, but with less success. A 1922 report said "the companies will come to town on the same day each week to offer what is declared to be comedies with music, musical shows with chorus girls or whatever may best describe clean, wholesome offerings that should not be confused with "burlesque" as it was presented when Dad was a young chap."

== Affiliated theaters ==
During the 1922–23 season, Columbia shows were routed through the following theaters (alphabetically by city):

Palace, Baltimore; Casino, Boston; Gayety, Boston; Miner's, The Bronx; Casino, Brooklyn; Empire, Brooklyn; Gayety, Buffalo; Columbia, Chicago; Englewood, Chicago; Star & Garter, Chicago; Olympic, Cincinnati; Colonial, Cleveland; Lyric, Dayton; Gayety, Detroit; Majestic, Jersey City; Gayety, Kansas City; Gayety, Louisville; Gayety, Milwaukee; Gayety, Minneapolis; Gayety, Montreal; Miner's, Newark; Cohen's, Newburgh; Columbia, New York City; Hurtig & Seamon's 125th Street, New York City; Gayety, Omaha; Orpheum, Paterson; Casino, Philadelphia; Gayety, Pittsburgh; Cohen's, Poughkeepsie; Empire, Providence; Gayety, Rochester; Lyceum, Scranton; Gayety, St. Louis; Empire, Toledo; Empire, Toronto; Colonial, Utica; Gayety, Washington D.C.; Grand, Worcester.

Shows were not routed in this order and theaters were subject to change each season. The vast majority of these theaters were demolished.

== Show titles ==
The following shows were on the Columbia circuit in 1922–23:

American Girl; Beauty Revue; Big Jamboree; Bon Tons; Bowery Burlesquers; Broadway Brevities; Broadway Flappers; Bubble Bubble; Chuckles of 1922; Frank Finney; Flashlights of 1923; Follies of the Day; Folly Town; Giggles; Greenwich Village Revue; Hello Good Times; Sam Howe; Keep Smiling; Knick Knacks; Let’s Go; Maids of America; Dave Marion; Mimic World; Radio Girls; Al Reeves; Sam Sidman; Social Maids; Step On It; Talk of the Town; Temptations of 1922; Town Scandals; Varieties of 1922; Billy Watson; Sliding Billy Watson; Mollie Williams; Wine, Women and Song; and Youthful Follies.

Some titles were used year after year, although with different casts and content, while others changed titles but kept the same cast. Billy Watson and Sliding Billy Watson were two different performers.

== Decline and dissolution ==
The American Wheel was dissolved in 1922 due to a rift between Scribner and Herk, who felt that Columbia was out of step with the times. A rival independent wheel, the Mutual Wheel, was formed and eventually headed by Herk. Mutual shows were less elaborate than Columbia's, but took inspiration from the modern risqué revues of Flo Ziegfeld and Earl Carroll.

In 1923 Columbia was still the largest burlesque operation in the country with thirty-eight shows on its wheel. However, receipts were declining. During the 1925 season Scribner grudgingly authorized chorus girls, who had worn tights for over twenty years, to perform barelegged. More significantly, he permitted the show "Powder Puff Revue" to feature a tableaux of bare-breasted women similar to those in the revues of Ziegfeld and Earl Carroll. By the mid-1920s cinemas were providing shows that combined film and live entertainment with ticket prices lower than any burlesque show. Columbia continued to lose customers to Mutual, more explicit stock burlesque, and other types of entertainment. Performers and theaters began deserting Columbia and switched to Mutual.

Mutual also stumbled in the late 1920s, and merged with Columbia in 1927 to form the United Burlesque Association, with Herk as president and Scribner as the chairman of the board. The new organization, comprising 44 theaters, was still referred to as Mutual, and soon reverted to that name.

By the 1927–28 season the combined circuit was struggling financially and the following year the Great Depression proved fatal. With smaller, cheaper stock burlesque theaters popping up, the combined wheel decided to revive clean burlesque in 1930–31. The experiment failed, and the circuit closed.
