= List of vaudeville performers: L–Z =

This is a partial list of vaudeville performers. Inclusion on this list indicates that the subject appeared at least once on the North American vaudeville stage during its heyday between 1881 and 1932. The source in the citation included with each entry confirms their appearance and cites information in the performance notes section.

Vaudeville was a style of variety entertainment predominant in the late 19th and early 20th centuries. Developing from many sources, including saloon shows, minstrel shows, freak shows, dime museums, British pantomimes, and other popular forms of entertainment, vaudeville became one of the most popular types of entertainment in America, Canada, Australia and New Zealand. Vaudeville took the form of a series of separate, unrelated acts each featuring different types of performance, including classical and popular musical acts, dance performances, comedy, animal acts, magic and illusions, female and male impersonators, acrobatic and athletic feats, one-act plays or scenes from plays, lectures, minstrels, or even short films. A vaudeville performer is sometimes known as a "vaudevillian".

== L ==
Name	Birth	Death	Nationality	Performance notes	Reference
Wilton Lackaye	September 30, 1862	August 22, 1932	American	Actor.	
Bert Lahr	August 13, 1895	December 4, 1967	American	Part of the comic act Lahr & Mercedes, a comic act. Later gained fame as an actor in films, most notably as the Cowardly Lion in the 1939 film, The Wizard of Oz.	
Leona LaMar	October 26, 1883	April 22, 1941	American	Mentalist	
Bessie Lamb	c. 1878	October 30, 1907	American	Singer and mimic. Credited with bringing ragtime to vaudeville.	
Professor Lamberti	January 9, 1892	March 13, 1950	American	Born Basil Garwood Lambert. A skilled xylophone player who entered vaudeville as a serious musician, but he soon added comic effects to his act.	
Dorothy Lamour	December 10, 1914	September 22, 1996	American	Actress in a Fanchon & Marco revue.	
Burt Lancaster	November 2, 1913	October 20, 1994	American	Oscar-winning actor, who started out in his teens an acrobat with Nick Cravat, Lang & Cravat.	
Harry Langdon	June 15, 1884	December 22, 1944	American	Comedian who formed an act called "Johnny's New Car" with Rose Francis in 1903 and toured the Orpheum Circuit until finding greater success in silent films.	
Lillie Langtry	October 13, 1853	February 12, 1929	British	Actress, widely known as the mistress of Edward VII.	
Grace La Rue	June 14, 1895	July 17, 1971	American	Dancer and singer.	
Jesse L. Lasky	September 13, 1880	January 13, 1958	American	Actor who later co-founded Paramount Pictures with Adolph Zukor.	
Alfred Latell	January 19, 1887	April 4, 1951	American	Animal impersonator.	
The Lassiter Brothers	1904	1988	American	Warren and Francis Lassiter performed acrobatics, dance and comedy in the Publix and Taka Chance vaudeville troupes.	
Elsie Newlin Lassiter	1904	1985	American	Chorus girl Taka Chance Vaudeville Troupe.	
Sir Harry Lauder	August 4, 1870	February 26, 1950	Scottish	Singer and comedian from the British Music Hall who made 22 tours of the US.	
Hazel Bess Laugenour	1899	1960	American	Toured vaudeville with a swim tank act, promoting her swimming films.	
Stan Laurel	June 16, 1890	February 23, 1965	British	Music Hall comedian who toured America with the Karno Troupe and stayed behind, along with Charlie Chaplin to enter films. Later teamed with Oliver Hardy (January 18, 1892 – August 7, 1957) to form Laurel and Hardy.	
Joe Laurie Jr.	1892	April 29, 1954	American	Monologist and comedian.	
Al Lee			American	Comedian and "straight man" for Eddie Cantor.	
Gypsy Rose Lee	February 9, 1911	April 26, 1970	American	Dancer and actress.	
Jane and Kathryn Lee			Scottish	Sister act with Jane (1912 – April 20, 1957) and Kathryn (b. 1909).	
Lila Lee	July 25, 1901	November 13, 1973	American	Actress.	
Richard LeGrand	August 29, 1882	June 29, 1963	American	Actor.	
Lillian Leitzel	1891?	February 15, 1931	Hungarian		
Charles Le Maire	1897	1985	American	A former vaudeville performer, Le Maire began working on costumes for Broadway shows in 1921. While in New York, he designed costumes for the Ziegfeld Follies, George White's Scandals and Earl Carroll's Vanities. By the mid-1940s he was a costume exec and wardrobe director with Twentieth Century Fox where he was nominated for 13 Academy Awards and won 3.	
Dan Leno	December 20, 1860	October 31, 1904	British	Considered one of the greatest British Music Hall comedians who first toured the US in 1897.	
Eddie Leonard	October 18, 1883	July 29, 1941	American	Blackface minstrel.	
Ruggero Leoncavallo	April 23, 1857	August 9, 1919	Italian	Composer and conductor. Toured with an Italian symphony orchestra.	
Mervyn LeRoy	October 15, 1900	September 13, 1987	American	Singer. Later a Hollywood director and producer.	
Stella LeSaint	December 17, 1881	September 21, 1948	American	Actress with her own vaudeville troupe, Stella Razeto and Company.	
Joan Leslie	January 26, 1925	October 12, 2015	American	Singer, began performing at the age of nine with her sisters in an act called, "The Three Brodels." She worked briefly as a model and by 1936 was in Hollywood as a child star billed as Joan Brodel. In 1940, she signed with Warner Bros. as an ingenue.	
Lew Leslie	1886	1963	American	Singer; and did a "patter act."	
The Great Lester	1878	1956	American	Singer, pianist, comedian and actor.	
Ethel Levey	November 22, 1880	February 27, 1955	American	Actress and singer. Wife of George M. Cohan from 1900–1906.	
Ted Lewis	June 6, 1890	August 25, 1971	American	Bandleader, clarinetist and singer known for using the phrase, "Is everybody happy?" He appeared in small-time vaudeville before 1917. He appeared in a singing duo ("Giesler & Lewis") and later toured with his dance band, appearing at the Palace in 1919, billed as "The Jazz King." He appeared at the Palace again in the late 1920s.	
Tom Lewis			American	Comedian.	
J. Aldrich Libbey	February 29, 1864	April 29, 1925	American	Actor, singer, launched "After the Ball"	
Winnie Lightner	September 17, 1900	March 5, 1971	American	Singer known as "The Song-a-Minute Girl."	
Beatrice Lillie	May 29, 1894	January 20, 1989	Canadian	Comedian, known for her absurd double entendres.	
John Lind	1877	1940	American	Female impersonator, often billed as "Lind?."	
Jack Little	May 28, 1900	April 9, 1956	British	Bandleader, singer and songwriter.	
Little Tich	July 21, 1867	February 10, 1928	British	Comedian, patter-singer and dancer.	
Mary Livingstone	June 23, 1905	June 30, 1983	American	Comedian and wife of Jack Benny.	
Alice Lloyd	October 20, 1873	November 16, 1949	British	Singer and sister of Marie Lloyd.	
Marie Lloyd	February 12, 1870	October 7, 1922	British	Singer.	
Cecilia Loftus	October 22, 1876	July 12, 1943	British	Actress, mimic and singer.	
Marie Loftus	24 November 1857	1940	British	actress and singer	.
Ella Lola	2 September 1883		American	Dancer who also appearance in some Kinetoscope productions.	
Guy Lombardo	June 19, 1902	November 5, 1977	Canadian	Bandleader, best known for his "Auld Lang Syne" every New Year's Eve.	
Long Tack Sam	1885		Chinese	Magician and acrobat.	
Vincent Lopez	December 30, 1895	September 20, 1975	American	Pianist and bandleader.	
James Loster	January 1, 1894	April 20, 1948	American	Acrobat and part of James and Vernie Loster vaudeville act. Married to Vernie Loster. Real name was James Fitzpatrick.	
Montagu Love	March 15, 1877	May 17, 1943	British	Actor.	
Edmund Lowe	March 3, 1890	April 21, 1971	American	Actor. He later married vaudevillian, Lilyan Tashman.	
Ed Lowry	February 1, 1898	August 17, 1983	American	Comedian and saxophonist.	
Scooter Lowry	December 19, 1919	May 1, 1989	American	Actor, singer, dancer, and celebrity impersonator	
Edna Luby	October 12, 1884	October 1, 1928	American	Celebrity Impersonator	
Nick Lucas	August 22, 1897	July 28, 1982	American	Singer and guitarist.	
Sam Lucas	1850	January 5, 1916	American	Minstrel, actor, singer and comedian. He and his wife were among the first African-Americans to play vaudeville.	

== M ==
Name	Birth	Death	Nationality	Performance notes	Reference
Moms Mabley	March 19, 1894	May 23, 1975	American	Comedian billed as "The Funniest Woman in the World."	
Adelaide Macarte	1879	1908	British	Part of the trapeze and strongwoman act the Macarte Sisters	
Cecilia Macarte	1880		British	Part of the trapeze and strongwoman act the Macarte Sisters	
Julia Macarte	1878	1958	British	Part of the trapeze and strongwoman act the Macarte Sisters	
June MacCloy	June 2, 1909	May 5, 2005	American	Actress and singer who appeared in the Earl Carroll Vanities and the George White Scandals. Later she appeared in vaudeville.	
Jeanette MacDonald	June 18, 1903	January 14, 1965	American	Singer and actress.	
Machinson Sisters			British	British take on the Barrison Sisters.	
Willard Mack	September 18, 1873	November 18, 1934	Canadian	Actor.	
Violet MacMillan	March 4, 1887	December 29, 1953	American	Actress.	
Fred MacMurray	August 30, 1908	November 5, 1991	American	Actor, got his start by touring with the California Collegiates as a saxophonist.	
Uncle Dave Macon	October 7, 1870	March 22, 1952	American	Banjo player, singer, songwriter and comedian. In 1916, a talent scout for the Loew's circuit heard him play in Birmingham, Alabama and booked him to tour the circuit in the South.	
Joe Madden	August 30, 1908	November 5, 1991	American	Juggling Comedian, clown, and character actor.	
Will Mahoney	February 5, 1894	February 8, 1967	American	Comedian and xylophonist.	
Marjorie Main	February 24, 1890	April 10, 1975	American	Actress and comedian. Later a character actress in many films.	
Boots Mallory	October 22, 1913	December 1, 1958	American	Dancer and later a Ziegfeld girl. Mallory debuted in vaudeville as the banjo player for a girls' band at the age of 12. By the age of 16, she was working as a dancer and she made her screen debut in 1932.	
Edna Malone	February 1, 1899		Canadian	Dancer.	
Leon Mandrake	1911	1993	Canadian	Magician.	
George Mann	December 2, 1905	November 22, 1977	American	Taller half of the comedic and acrobatic dance act, Barto and Mann.	
Martha Mansfield	July 14, 1899	November 30, 1923	American	Actress.	
Rabbit Maranville	November 11, 1891	January 5, 1954	American	Baseball player who appeared in vaudeville in an act with Eddy McHugh.	
Fay Marbe	February 4, 1899	June 2, 1986	American	Singer and dancer.	
Marceline and Sea Lion			British	An act with a sea lion and its trainer. The act appeared in the mid-1920s.	
Baby Rose Marie	August 15, 1923	December 28, 2017	American	At the age of three, Rosie Marie Mazzetta started performing as a singer and dancer in vaudeville under the name "Baby Rose Marie." At five, she left vaudeville to become a radio star on NBC and after that made a series of films. Later, as Rose Marie, she appeared in both films and television series.	
Pauline Markham	May, 1847	March 20, 1919	British-American	Singer, dancer and actress	
Pigmeat Markham	April 18, 1904	December 31, 1981	American	Comedian, singer, dancer and actor.	
Rube Marquard	October 9, 1886	June 1, 1980	American	Baseball player who appeared in vaudeville in 1911 with Annie Kent. He appeared twice with Blossom Seeley and later with Billy Dooley.	
Sara Martin	June 18, 1884	May 24, 1955	American	Blues singer. Martin toured vaudeville in the Chicago area around 1915 and then New York in 1922.	
Marx Brothers			American	Comic team of five brothers: Chico Marx (March 22, 1887 – October 11, 1961), Harpo Marx (November 23, 1888 – September 28, 1964), Groucho Marx (October 2, 1890 – August 19, 1977), Gummo Marx (October 23, 1893 – April 21, 1977) and Zeppo Marx (February 25, 1901 – November 29, 1979).	
Will Maston	1903	1975	American	Dancer and singer. Toured with Sammy Davis, Sr., father of Sammy Davis, Jr.	
Christy Mathewson	August 12, 1880	October 7, 1925	American	Baseball player who appeared in vaudeville with catcher Chief Meyers in an act with May Tulley called Curves.	
Virginia Mayo	November 30, 1920	January 17, 2005	American	Actress. Appeared in an act with Andy Mayo. Best known for her roles in Warner Bros. film noirs such as White Heat.	
Winsor McCay	September 26, 1867(?)	July 26, 1934	American	Cartoonist and animator who toured vaudeville with his creation, Gertie the Dinosaur.	
Bessie McCoy	1888	August 16, 1931	American	Singer and dancer known as "The Yama-Yama Girl."	
Paul McCullough	1883	March 25, 1936	American	Comedian who teamed up with Bobby Clark.	
Owen McGiveney	May 4, 1884	July 31, 1967	British	Quick-change artist.	
Terry McGovern	March 9, 1880	February 22, 1918	American	Boxer who held world bantamweight and featherweight titles.	
Tex McGuire	February 29, 1909	August 2, 1992	American	Guitar, banjo and dobro player.	
McIntyre and Heath			American	Minstrel duo composed of James McIntyre (1857–1937) and Thomas Heath (1852–1938).	
Victor McLaglen	December 10, 1886	November 7, 1959	British-American	Academy Award-winning actor, appeared also as a boxer and acrobat. Later became famous in films working as a character actor mostly under John Ford's direction.	
Aimee Semple McPherson	October 9, 1890	September 27, 1944	American	Evangelist.	
Raquel Meller	March 10, 1888	July 26, 1962	Spanish	Chanteuse.	
Rose Melville	January 30, 1867	October 8, 1946	American	Singing-comedian.	
Adolphe Menjou	February 18, 1890	October 29, 1963	American	Actor and comedian, later known as a character actor in films such as the original A Star Is Born.	
Ethel Merman	January 16, 1909	February 15, 1984	American	Singer and actress, possibly the most pre-eminent star in Broadway musicals.	
Emma Messing	October 29, 1872	April 21, 1950	American	Actress	
Chief Meyers	July 29, 1880	July 25, 1971	American	Baseball player who appeared in vaudeville with catcher Chief Meyers in an act with May Tulley called Curves.	
Vera Michelena	June 16, 1885	August 28, 1961	American	Musical actress and dancer.	
Charles B. Middleton	October 3, 1874	April 22, 1949	American	Character actor who often played commanding or villainous characters in films in the 1920s.	
Lizzie Miles	March 31, 1895	March 17, 1963	American	Blues singer. Toured the south in theatres and circuses. She also toured with minstrel shows.	
Miller and Lyles			American	Comic duo and well known comic writers. Duo was composed of Flourney E. Miller (April 14, 1887 – June 6, 1971) and Aubrey L. Lyles (1884 – July 28, 1932).	
Emmett Miller	February 2, 1900	1962	American	Minstrel and singer noted for his yodel-like falsetto voice.	
Marilyn Miller	September 1, 1898	April 7, 1936	American	Dancer, starred in several Ziegfeld shows such as Sally, Sunny, and Rosalie where she played the all-American girl to full extent. Also appeared in numerous editions of the Ziegfeld Follies.	
Mills Brothers			American	Vocal quartet with John Jr. (1911–1936) basso and guitarist, Herbert (Apr. 1912 – April 12, 1989) tenor, Harry (August 19, 1913 – June 20, 1982) baritone, and Donald (April 29, 1915 – November 13, 1999) lead tenor. The famed vocal group began in small-time vaudeville and worked their way up to the big-time, appearing at the Palace the week of January 23, 1931.	
Florence Mills	January 25, 1896	November 1, 1927	American	Comedian, singer and dancer.	
Borrah Minnevitch and His Harmonica Rascals			Russian	Borrah Minnevitch put together this act with midgets playing harmonicas. This act is credited with popularizing the harmonica in America.	
Rhea Mitchell	December 10, 1890	September 16, 1957	American	Actress.	
Tom Mix	January 6, 1880	October 12, 1940	American	Sharpshooter who joined the Miller Brothers 101 Ranch Wild West Show in 1909. He appeared in Western films starting in 1910 and when he appeared at the Hippodrome in New York, 1928, he broke all attendance records.	
Marshall Montgomery	1886	September 30, 1942	American	Comic musician and ventriloquist.	
Montrose and Allen			American	Comic duo consisting of Billy Allen and his wife, Belle Montrose (April 23, 1886 – October 26, 1963).	
Florence Moore	1886	March 23, 1935	American	Singer-comedian. First female emcee at the Palace.	
Tim Moore	December 9, 1887	December 13, 1958	American	Comedian and actor. Child act on the Keith Circuit, "The Gold Dust Twins" with Romeo Washburn, 1897 to 1899. Husband and wife team: Tim and Hester Moore, 1908 to 1915 (Southern Consolidated Circuit); and Tim and Gertie Moore, 1915 to 1927 (Dudley Circuit, Orpheum Circuit, Fuller Circuit, New Zealand, and T.O.B.A. circuit. Music hall tours of Great Britain on the Empire circuit; tours of New Zealand on the Fuller Circuit (1917-1919). "Tim Moore's Chicago Follies' tours on the T.O.B.A. circuit, 1921 to 1925. "Rarin' to Go," on the Columbia Burlesque Wheel, 1925 to 1927.	
Victor Moore	February 24, 1876	July 23, 1962	American	Comedian, later became famous as a character actor on both stage and screen.	
Polly Moran	June 28, 1883	January 25, 1952	American	Actress and comedian, best known for her films opposite Marie Dressler.	
Mantan Moreland	September 3, 1902	September 28, 1973	American	Actor and comedian, performed on the "Chitlin Circuit" for many years.	
Helen Morgan	August 2, 1900	August 8, 1941	American	Singer and actress, known for reinvigorating the torch song with her performance in Show Boat and for leading a somewhat tragic life.	
Clara Morris	March 17, 1849	November 20, 1925	Canadian	Actress.	
Johnnie Morris	June 15, 1887	October 7, 1969	American	Comedian and actor.	
Lily Morris	1884	October 3, 1952	British	Singing-comedian.	
Ernie Morrison	December 20, 1912	July 24, 1989	American	Dancer.	
Lee Morse	1904	December 16, 1954	American	Blues singer known for her trademark yodeling.	
Charles Morton	January 28, 1907	October 26, 1966	American	Actor.	
James J. Morton	December 25, 1861	April 10, 1938	American	Comedian known as "The Boy Comic."	
Jelly Roll Morton	September 20, 1885	July 10, 1941	American	Pianist, bandleader and composer, one of the founders of modern-day jazz.	
Mosconi Brothers			American	Dance duo consisting of brothers Louis (1895–1969) and Charles Mosconi (1892–1975).	
Bennie Moten	November 13, 1894	April 2, 1935	American	Jazz pianist and bandleader of Bennie Moten's Kansas City Orchestra. Count Basie was recruited to play piano with the band in 1929. Moten toured on the T.O.B.A. circuits.	
George W. Munroe	1857	January 29, 1932	American	Actor known for female impersonations of Irish women.	
Ona Munson	June 16, 1903	February 11, 1955	American	Singer and actress.	
Billy Murray	May 25, 1877	August 17, 1954	American	Singer.	
J. Harold Murray	February 17, 1891	December 11, 1940	American	Singer.	
Jan Murray	October 4, 1916	July 2, 2006	American	Comedian, later known for his appearances on The Hollywood Squares and many TV variety shows.	
Ken Murray	July 14, 1903	October 12, 1988	American	Actor and singer. Served as the emcee at the Palace.	

== N–O ==
Name	Birth	Death	Nationality	Performance notes	Reference
Alfred Næss	April 26, 1877	July 6, 1955	Norwegian	Speedskater who toured with Austrian skater, Frieda Meyer (c. 1890 – 1976).	
Conrad Nagel	March 16, 1897	February 24, 1970	American	Actor, began as an acrobat in vaudeville but switched professions. Later became a matinee idol once signed to MGM.	
John Nash	March 7, 1828	October 13, 1901	British	British Music Hall performer, first to tour the US.	
Mary Nash	August 15, 1884	December 3, 1976	American	Actress.	
Carrie Nation	November 25, 1846	June 9, 1911	American	Leader in the Temperance movement.	
Alla Nazimova	May 22, 1879	July 14, 1945	Russian	Actress, known for her flamboyant acting style and offscreen life.	
Harriet Nelson	July 18, 1909	October 2, 1994	American	Singer and actress. Wife of Ozzie Nelson and mother of Ricky Nelson.	
Ozzie Nelson	March 20, 1906	June 3, 1975	American	Bandleader for the Ozzie Nelson band. Husband of Harriet Nelson (the band's singer) and father of Ricky Nelson.	
Evelyn Nesbit	December 25, 1884	January 17, 1967	American	Dancer. Nesbit was the focal point of a love triangle between her lover, architect Stanford White and her husband, millionaire Harry K. Thaw. Following White's shooting death at the hands of Thaw, Nesbit became a popular attraction onstage.	
Alfred Newman	March 17, 1900	February 17, 1970	American	Pianist. Later a film composer, conductor and music director.	
Fred Niblo	January 6, 1874	November 11, 1948	American	Minstrel and blackface monologuist. Niblo began touring with George M. Cohan's troupe and appeared in some of his Broadway shows. After marrying Cohan's sister, Josephine, Niblo moved to Hollywood where he worked with Thomas Ince as an actor and moved on to directing. His wife, Josephine died in 1916 under odd circumstances creating a feud between Cohan and Niblo. |	
Nicholas Brothers			American	Tap dancers, brothers Fayard (October 20, 1914 – January 24, 2006) and Harold (March 27, 1921 – July 3, 2000). Found greater fame appearing in such movies as Stormy Weather and Sun Valley Serenade.	
Alice Nielsen	1872	1943	American	Operatic singer.	
Marian Nixon	October 20, 1904	February 13, 1983	American	Former vaudeville chorus girl who entered films in 1922.	
Karyl Norman	June 13, 1897	July 23, 1947	American	Female impersonator billed as "The Creole Fashion Plate."	
Bobby North	February 2, 1884	August 13, 1976	American	Singer, dancer, actor and Jewish comedian.	
Ruby Norton			American	Singer accompanied by Clarence Senna.	
Red Norvo	March 31, 1908	April 6, 1999	American	Xylophonist with Paul Whiteman.	
Jack Norworth	January 5, 1879	September 1, 1959	American	Singer and actor. Husband of Nora Bayes.	
Annie Oakley	August 13, 1860	November 3, 1926	American	Famed sharpshooter, later the subject of the Broadway musical and film Annie Get Your Gun.	
Buck O'Brien	May 9, 1882	July 25, 1959	American	Baseball player who appeared with the Boston Red Sox Quartette in 1912. The quartet included Hugh Bradley, Marty Hale and Bill Lyons.	
Donald O'Connor	August 28, 1925	September 27, 2003	American	Actor, dancer, and member of The O'Connor Family—Royal Family of Vaudeville.	
Pasty O'Connor	January 23, 1930	July 4, 2017	American	Singer, dancer, and member of "The O'Connor Family—Royal Family of Vaudeville.	
Geoffrey O'Hara	February 2, 1882	January 31, 1967	Canadian	Singer and songwriter.	
Walter O'Keefe	August 18, 1900	June 26, 1983	American	Singer and songwriter.	
Chauncey Olcott	July 21, 1858	March 18, 1932	American	Actor, minstrel, and monologist.	
Charley O'Leary	October 15, 1882	January 6, 1941	American	Former baseball player who had an act with Germany Schaefer.	
Olsen and Johnson			American	Comic duo with Ole Olsen (November 6, 1892 – January 26, 1963) and Chic Johnson (March 15, 1891 – February 28, 1962). Biggest success came with the revue Hellzapoppin'.	
Patrick H. O'Malley Jr.	September 3, 1890	May 21, 1966	American	Actor.	
Nance O'Neill	1874	1965	American	Actress.	
Original Creole Orchestra			American	Early jazz band also known as the Original Creole Band and the Original Creole Jass Band. The 11 member band included the founder, Bill Johnson (August 10, 1872 – December 3, 1972), on mandolin and cornetist Freddie Keppard (February 27, 1890 – July 15, 1933). In 1916, Victor offered to record the orchestra, which would have made them the first jazz band to record, but they refused.	
Michael O'Shea	March 17, 1906	December 4, 1973	American	Toured with Jack Johnson's vaudeville show in 1923 and worked on the legit stage. O'Shea worked as a leading man in films in the 1940s and 1950s.	
Jack Osterman	April 8, 1902	June 8, 1939	American	Comedian known as the "Bad Boy of Broadway" In the 1920s Osterman was earning $1750 a week as a headliner and revue star. He played the Palace in March 1924 and April 1932. He also appeared in a number of musical comedies.	
Jack Owens, The Cruising Crooner	October 17, 1912	January 26, 1982	American	Singer.	

== P–Q ==
Name	Birth	Death	Nationality	Performance notes	Reference
Earl Palmer	October 25, 1924	September 19, 2008	American	Singer and dancer who toured in vaudeville with Ida Cox. In 1947, Palmer took up the drums and became a noted drummer.	
Harry Palmer	July 12, 1889	October 5, 1972	American	Actor and comedian in a comic duo with Jo Hayden, Palmer and Hayden.	
Eddie Parkes	1893	July 24, 1985	American	Song and dance man.	
James Parrott	August 2, 1898	May 10, 1939	American	Singer and comedian.	
Tony Pastor	May 28, 1837	August 26, 1908	American	Singer and actor. Credited as one of the founders of vaudeville.	
Signe Paterson	1890	Aug 15, 1963	Swedish-American	Dancer; popularized the Hula and Shimmy on American stages. Sometimes billed as Signe Patterson or Signe Petterson.	
Isabella Patricola	1886	May 23, 1965	American	Singer; at height of her fame billed simply as "Patricola" or as "Miss Patricola". Full name Isabel or Isabella Patricola.	
Hank Patterson	October 9, 1888	August 23, 1975	American	Pianist and actor.	
Pauline?	1874	November 11, 1942	American	Stage hypnotist who was billed simply as Pauline? (with a question mark).	
Edna Payne	December 5, 1891	January 31, 1953	American	Actress.	
John Payne	May 23, 1912	December 6, 1989	American	Singer, later became one of Fox Studio's frequent leading men in their movie musicals.	
Eddie Peabody	February 19, 1902	November 7, 1970	American	Banjo player.	
Jack Pearl	October 29, 1894	December 25, 1984	American	Comedian once teamed with Ben Bard.	
Peerless Quartet			American	All-male vocal quartet.	
Peerless Trio	1917	1921	American	Composed of Tom Rosa (Thomas Savage), Mazie Berto (Bertha Mae DeCroteau), Anna Vincet (Suzette Carsell). Suzette Carsell became known as the "Mother of the Accordian [sic]"	
Joe Penner	January 5, 1879	September 1, 1959	Hungarian-American	Comedian, known for his catchphrase "Wanna buy a duck?".	
Ann Pennington	December 23, 1892	November 7, 1971	American	Dancer known as "The Girl With the Dimpled Knees."	
Jack Pepper	June 14, 1902	April 1, 1979	American	A juvenile comedian, Pepper appeared in vaudeville in the mid-1920s with his sisters, Helen and Winnie Mae and Frank Salt in an act called "Salt and Pepper." In 1929, Pepper made his film debut in an MGM short film.	
Olga Petrova	May 10, 1884	November 30, 1977	British	Known for her undefinable act which might include acting, recitations or singing.	
Molly Picon	June 1, 1898	April 5, 1992	American	Actress, known for her Yiddish songs and skits and close ties to the Jewish community.	
Polaire	May 13, 1879	October 14, 1939	French	Singer and actress.	
Daphne Pollard	1892	1978	Australian	Comedian and actress.	
The Ponce Sisters			American	Popular singing duo in the mid-1920s and early 1930s.	
Rosa Ponselle	January 22, 1897	May 25, 1981	American	Operatic soprano. She toured with her sister, mezzo-soprano Carmella, as "Those Tailored Italian Girls."	
Beulah Poynter	June 6, 1883	August 13, 1960	American	Actress, 1913 skit Dear Doctor	
Eleanor Powell	November 21, 1912	February 11, 1982	American	Tap dancer and actress who started with Gus Edwards. Later found greater fame after signing with MGM.	
Evelyn Preer	July 16, 1896	November 27, 1932	American	Singer and actress.	
George E. Price	January 5, 1900	May 10, 1964	American	Song and dance man.	
Kate Price	February 13, 1872	January 4, 1943	Irish	Actress who toured vaudeville with her husband, Joseph Price Ludwig.	
Primrose and West			American	Blackface song and dance team composed of George H. Primrose (November 12, 1852 – July 23, 1919) and Billy West.	
F. F. Proctor	March 17, 1851	September 4, 1929	American	Juggler. Later Proctor would be a major vaudeville impresario.	
Eva Puck	November 27, 1892	October 25, 1979	American	Singer-comedian and dancer.	
Mae Questel	September 13, 1908	January 4, 1998	American	Actress and comedian, best known as the voices of Betty Boop and Olive Oyl.	
Eddie Quillan	March 31, 1907	January 19, 1990	American	Actor with family act the age 7.	

== R ==
Name	Birth	Death	Nationality	Performance notes	Reference
Jackie Rae	May 14, 1922	October 5, 2006	Canadian	Singer and songwriter, began performing with his brother, Saul (December 31, 1914 – January 9, 1999) and sister, Grace, at the age of three. The three performed as The Three Little Raes of Sunshine.	
George Raft	September 26, 1901	November 24, 1980	American	Actor, began as a dancer in the Orpheum and Keith circuits and in Texas Guinan's nightclub.	
Ma Rainey	September 1882	December 22, 1939	American	Billed as the "Mother of the Blues."	
Esther Ralston	September 17, 1902	January 14, 1994	American	Actress and comedian who made her appearance in her parents' act at the age of 2. At 14, she made her screen debut and following a few small roles eventually became one of America's highest paid stars of the era. Appeared at the Palace the week of June 14, 1930.	
Marjorie Rambeau	July 15, 1889	July 6, 1970	American	Actress.	
Sally Rand	January 2, 1904	August 31, 1979	American	Dancer known for her famous fan dance which had Rand arrested several times, most notably at the 1933 World's Fair. Rand also danced with a bubble and dressed as Lady Godiva, horse and all.	
Amanda Randolph	February 2, 1896	August 24, 1967	American	Singer and comedian best known for her television work. In Shuffle Along (1924) and one of the "Three Dixie Songbirds".	
Isabel Randolph	December 4, 1889	January 11, 1973	American	Stage, radio, film and television actress who began in vaudeville as a child, performing with her parents.	
Doris Rankin	1880	1946	American	Actress who appeared in a tab sketch of How Do You Know? in 1925. She was the daughter of McKee Rankin and wife of Lionel Barrymore.	
Joey Rardin	1915	1972	American	One-man band, James Cagney impersonator, vocalist, and master of ceremonies. Known as the "Mighty Man of Mirth". Toured with Ben Bernie and a few other big bands.	[337}
Albertina Rasch		October 2, 1967	Austrian	Dancer who headed a ballet troupe. Female dance director for Metro-Goldwyn-Mayer.	
Enrico Rastelli	December 19, 1896	December 13, 1931	Italian	Juggler and acrobat.	
Zelma Rawlston		October 30, 1915	German-American	Singer and comedian, specializing in male impersonation.	
Don Raye	March 16, 1909	January 29, 1985	American	Song-and-dance man and songwriter. He and Hughie Prince wrote the hit song Boogie Woogie Bugle Boy of Company B.	
Martha Raye	August 27, 1916	October 19, 1994	American	Comedian and actress born in Butte, Montana where her vaudevillian parents had been stranded. Raye debuted with her parents at the age of three, and by 13 was touring as a singer in a band. Raye first began working in films in 1935.	
Ada Reeve	March 3, 1874	September 25, 1966	British	Light comedian and singer.	
Al Reeves	May 30, 1865	February 26, 1940	American	Singer and banjo player.	
Wallace Reid	April 15, 1891	January 18, 1923	American	Toured in a sketch called The Girl and the Ranger. Later a major silent-movie star.	
Francis Renault	c. 1893	May 29, 1955	American	Female impersonator billed as "The Original Slave of Fashion."	
The Revelers			American	All-male close harmony group, popular on stage, screen, radio, and records.	
The Rhythm Boys	May 2, 1901	October 14, 1977	American	Male singing trio consisting of Bing Crosby (1901–1977), Al Rinker (1907–1982) and Harry Barris (1905–1962). The group began as a duo between Crosby and Rinker who called themselves "Two Boys and a Piano." The group began singing with Paul Whiteman and his orchestra in 1926, nearly a year after the two young men joined forces. The duo became a trio in 1927 when pianist, singer and songwriter Barris joined them. The group disbanded when Crosby left to start a solo career in 1931.	
Lieutenant Gitz Rice	March 5, 1891	October 16, 1947	Canadian	Singer and songwriter.	
Buddy Rich	September 30, 1917	April 2, 1987	American	Drummer and bandleader who appeared in his parents vaudeville act (as "Buddy Traps") before the age of two.	
Frank "Cannonball" Richards	February 20, 1887	February 7, 1969	American	Performer whose act involved taking heavy blows to his belly.	
Harry Richman	August 10, 1895	November 3, 1972	American	Song and dance man and songwriter.	
Rin Tin Tin	c. September 10, 1918	August 10, 1932		German Shepherd dog which had become famous in silent films and later in radio. Rin Tin Tin appeared at the Palace in May 1930.	
Blanche Ring	April 24, 1876	January 13, 1961	American	Singer, actress, and vaudeville favorite. Sister of Julie and Frances Ring, and Cyril Ring.	
Julie Ring	July 4, 1880	January 15, 1951	American	Singer and actress. Sister of Blanche and Frances Ring, who were known as the Ring Sisters even though they normally performed separately. Wife of Theater Agent, Albert H. Sutherland (died 1911) and Vaudevillian James "Jack" Norva l.	
Adele Ritchie	December 21, 1874	April 24, 1930	American	Singer.	
Thelma Ritter	February 14, 1905	February 5, 1969	American	Actress.	
Ritz Brothers			American	Trio of brothers who danced and performed slapstick and acrobatic comedy. Their birth name was Joachim. The trio was composed of Al (August 27, 1901 – December 22, 1965), Harry ((October 4, 1904 – November 17, 1985) and Jimmy Ritz ((May 22, 1907 – March 29, 1986). They were managed by their brother, George. The brothers debuted at the Albee Theatre in Brooklyn in 1925. They were one of the top attractions of the era and appeared in Earl Carroll's Vanities.	
Edith Roberts	September 17, 1899	August 20, 1935	American	Actress.	
Joe Roberts	February 2, 1871	October 28, 1923	American	Actor who toured with his wife, Lillian Stuart Roberts, as part of a rowdy act called Roberts, Hays and Roberts.	
George Robey	September 20, 1869	November 29, 1954	British	British music hall actor and comedian.	
A. Robins	c. 1886	December 17, 1950	American	Clown novelty act. Robins later performed as "The Banana Man".	
Bill 'Bojangles' Robinson	May 25, 1878	November 25, 1949	American	Tap dancer, who heavily influenced Fred Astaire and later appeared in many movie musicals for Fox, most notably opposite Shirley Temple.	
Rock and White			American	Comic duo composed of William Rock (1875–1922) and Frances White (1898–1969).	
Blossom Rock	August 21, 1895	January 14, 1978	American	Singer and actress, sister of Jeanette MacDonald and who toured initially (as Marie MacDonald) with Eve Sully. Later known for her role as Grandmama Addams on TV's The Addams Family.	
William Rock	August 5, 1872	June 27, 1922	American	Comedian and dancer who was later a part of two double acts.	
George L. "Doc" Rockwell	1890	March 2, 1978	American	Comedian billed as "Dr. Rockwell, Quack, Quack, Quack."	
"Klondike Kate" Rockwell	1873	1957	American	Dancer.	
Ginger Rogers	July 16, 1911	April 25, 1995	American	Dancer, singer and actress first appearing with Eddie Foy's troupe in Fort Worth, Texas in 1925. Working as a dancer, she toured alone and later with husband, Jack Pepper, as "Ginger and Pepper" in 1928. She sang with the Eddie Lowry Band in Chicago and the Paul Asch Orchestra in New York City. Rogers's first film appearance was in a 1930 film short for Paramount Pictures.	
Will Rogers	November 4, 1879	August 15, 1935	American	Actor, singer, comedian, and social commentator. Appeared in numerous editions of the Ziegfeld Follies and was considered the highlight by many. Later a major movie star.	
Ruth Roland	August 26, 1872	September 22, 1937	American	Actress and singer. Appeared at the Palace in March 1930 in a playlet, "Wanted." Later a major star of silent-movie serials.	
B. A. Rolfe	October 24, 1879	April 23, 1956	American	Cornetist and bandleader.	
Mickey Rooney	September 23, 1920	April 6, 2014	American	Comedian, singer, dancer, and dramatic actor. Debuted in his parents' vaudeville act as a midget at the age of 2 years as "Sonny Yule." Hired by an MGM talent scout n New York. The producers insisted that his mother dye his hair black and change his name to "Mickey Looney". Both of his parents disagreed and settled on Rooney.	
Pat Rooney Sr.	1848	28 March 1892	English born Irish-American	Patriarch of the Rooney acting family. Began career in British music halls. Debut in America was either in New York City in 1870 at the Bowery Theatre or Fox's Theatre in Philadelphia in 1871. Famous for his Irish brogue and skills as a comedian and clog dancer. He wrote his own songs.	
Pat Rooney Jr.	4 July 1880	9 September 1962	Irish-American	Son of Pat Rooney Sr. He began his career performing with his father as a child in vaudeville. Like his father, he carried his Irish persona closely within his stage deportment and was a well known clog dancer and comedian. He invented the waltz-clog step used in tap dance and clog dancing. In addition to touring in vaudeville, he had seven decade long career in Broadway musicals which began with In Atlantic City in 1898 and concluded with the role of Arvide Abernathy in the original production of Guys and Dolls in 1952–1953. He also starred in two dozen silent films. When his son Pat Rooney III began performing, he took on his father's name Pat Rooney Sr. on the stage, and Pat Rooney III was often credited as Pat Rooney Jr; causing some confusion in sources among members of the family.	
Pat Rooney III	1909	November 5, 1975	American	Juvenile comedian and dancer. He teamed with Herbert Timberg (son of vaudeville star Herman Timberg) and they appeared on stage as "Herman Timberg, Jr. and Pat Rooney, Jr." They starred in 10 musical-comedy short subjects for Educational Pictures, released from 1936 to 1938.	
The Rooneys			American	Irish comic duo consisting of Pat Rooney Jr. (July 4, 1880– September 9, 1962) and his wife, Marion Bent (December 23, 1879 – July 28, 1940).	
Fred Rose	August 24, 1897	December 1, 1954	American	Pianist, singer and songwriter of mostly country songs. Worked with Paul Whiteman and His Orchestra.	
Harry Rose	December 2, 1893	December 10, 1962	British	Comedian and vaudeville master of ceremonies.	
Joe Rose	September 10, 1891	February 26, 1942	American	Jewish comedian, actor, producer of vaudeville shows, owner of Lyric Theatre, was there the night they raided Minsky's. Best known character was Red Hymie.	
Julian Rose	September 6, 1868	September 13, 1935	American	Jewish comedian.	
Baby Rose Marie	August 15, 1923	December 28, 2017	American	Child star and singer, later found fame on TV's The Dick Van Dyke Show and The Hollywood Squares	
Edward Roseman	May 14, 1875	September 16, 1957	American	Actor.	
Lillian Roth	December 13, 1910	May 2, 1980	American	Toured with her sister, Ann as Lillian Roth & Co. or The Roth Kids from the age of six. Roth starred in the Ziegfeld Midnight Frolics and Earl Carroll's Vanities, in the late 20s and 30s. Her 1954 autobiography I'll Cry Tomorrow later became a feature film of the same name.	
Adele Rowland	July 10, 1883	August 8, 1971	American	Singer.	
Ruth Royce	February 6, 1893	May 7, 1971	American	Actress.	
Ruth Roye	January 9, 1896	June 12, 1960	American	Ragtime singer.	
Benny Rubin	February 2, 1899	July 15, 1986	American	Jewish dialect comedian.	
David Rubinoff	1897	October 6, 1986	Russian-American	Violinist.	
Harry Ruby	October 29, 1895	February 23, 1974	American	Pianist and songwriter.	
Yvette Rugel	1890s	September 20, 1975	American	Singer.	
Fred Russell	September 29, 1862	October 14, 1957	British	Ventriloquist. Credited as "The Father of Modern Ventriloquism" as the first to use a dummy on his knee. His dummy was named "Coster Joe."	
Lillian Russell	December 4, 1861	June 6, 1922	American	Actress and singer.	
The Russell Brothers			American	Performed as "The Irish Servant Girls" in vaudeville for thirty years. They were John Russell (1854 – 1925) and James Russell (1859 – 1914).	
Babe Ruth	February 6, 1895	August 16, 1948	American	Baseball Hall of Famer who appeared in vaudeville with Wellington Cross of Cross & Josephine in 1921.	
Peggy Ryan	August 28, 1924	October 30, 2004	American	Child performer on the vaudeville stage and on screen, beginning at age 13. Ryan later appeared in movie musicals for Universal Studios opposite Donald O'Connor and Gloria Jean.	

== S ==
Name	Birth	Death	Nationality	Performance notes	Reference
Marin Sais	January 20, 1879	December 31, 1971	American	Actress.	
Charles "Chic" Sale	August 25, 1885	November 7, 1936	American	Actor, monologist and writer.	
Rae Samuels	May 3, 1887	October 24, 1979	American	Comic singer.	
Fred Sanborn	November 23, 1899	March 9, 1961	American	Drummer, xylophonist and stooge.	
Elvera Sanchez	September 1, 1905	September 2, 2000	American	Dancer.	
Eugen Sandow	April 2, 1867	October 14, 1925	German	Strong man, who was managed by Florenz Ziegfeld and appeared at the 1893 Columbian Exposition.	
Gilbert Sarony		December 15, 1910	American	Female impersonator who played an "old maid" character, also sand, danced, and performed minstrel shows.	
O. K. Sato	???	March 23, 1921	American	Juggler	
Thomas Francis Savage	1885	1921	American	Toured from 1910–1912 as Savage & De Croteau with wife Bertha Mae DeCroteau and 1916–1921 with the Peerless Trio as Tom Rosa with Bertha Mae DeCroteau (Mazie Berto) and Suzette Carsell (Anna Vincent), The Mother of the Accordion	
Jimmy Savo	1895	September 6, 1960	American	Pantomimist.	
Bert Savoy	c. 1888	June 26, 1923	American	Female impersonator with "straight man" Jay Brennan. His lines and mannerisms may have influenced Mae West.	
Claire Schade	1893	1991	American	Dancer, actress and singer	
Germany Schaefer	February 4, 1877	May 16, 1919	American	Former baseball player who had an act with Charley O'Leary.	
Fritzi Scheff	August 30, 1879	April 8, 1954	Austrian	Actress and singer.	
Ernestine Schumann-Heink	June 15, 1861	November 17, 1936	German	Operatic contralto.	
Malcolm Scott	March 7, 1872	September 7, 1929	British	Female impersonator billed as "The Woman Who Knows."	
Fred F. Sears	1913	1957	American	Dancer on the Radio-Keith-Orpheum (RKO) circuit. Later, Sears would become a film director for Columbia Pictures.	
Rolfe Sedan	January 20, 1896	September 16, 1982	American	Actor.	
Blossom Seeley	July 16, 1891	April 17, 1974	American	Singer.	
William Selig	March 14, 1864	July 15, 1948	American	Actor.	
Larry Semon	July 16, 1889	October 8, 1928	American	One of the highest-paid film comedians of the 1920s, Semon also directed many of the films he starred in. After problems with the Vitagraph studio in 1922, he began working as a comedian on the vaudeville stage.	
Ted Shapiro	October 31, 1899	March 26, 1980	American	Pianist and songwriter.	
Truly Shattuck	July 27, 1875	December 6, 1954	American	Singer, actress and dancer	
Wini Shaw	February 25, 1910	May 2, 1982	American	Actress in her parents' vaudeville act.	
Ella Shields	September 26, 1879	August 5, 1952	American-British	Male impersonator and singer.	
Ethel Shutta	December 1, 1896	February 5, 1976	American	Actress and later Ziegfeld Girl who toured with her mother, Augusta, and her brother, Jack, as The Three Shuttas.	
Martinus Sieveking	March 24, 1867	November 26, 1950	Dutch	Pianist and composer who toured with Eugen Sandow.	
William Silbor	c. 1864	January 4, 1917	Russian	Had a Vaudeville Booking Agency at 1402 Broadway, New York. Starred in an act called The Famous Silbor Four with his wife Blanche and daughters Blanche and Mabel. He was also part of the team of Silbor and Emerson. They were singers, dancers and petite entertainers.	
Phil Silvers	May 11, 1911	November 1, 1985	American	Originally a singer in vaudeville at the age of 13, Silvers appeared in some early movie musicals. After appearing in burlesque at Minsky's in 1934, he made in feature film debut in 1940. He appeared in Broadway and on TV in the 1950s where he won and Emmy Award. |	
Howard Simms	January 24, 1918	May 20, 2003	American	Tap dancer.	
Penny Singleton	September 15, 1908	November 12, 2003	American	Actress and comedian, later found fame playing Blondie in a series of films and voicing Jane Jetson.	
Singer's Midgets			mostly Austrian and Hungarian	A troupe of midgets under the management of Leo Singer (d. March 5, 1951). Best known for playing some of the Munchkins in The Wizard of Oz.	
Noble Sissle and Eubie Blake			American	Musical act with Sissle (July 10, 1889 – December 17, 1975) and Blake (February 7, 1887 – February 12, 1983). Blake and Sissle joined forces shortly after World War I, forming the "Dixie Duo", a musical act. The pair went on to create the groundbreaking musical, Shuffle Along. |	
Red Skelton	July 18, 1913	September 17, 1997	American	Comedian, who later found fame on both the big and small screen.	
Tod Sloan	August 10, 1874	December 21, 1933	American	Former thoroughbred racing jockey who briefly starred in a one-man vaudeville show with a monologue written by George M. Cohan. Legend has it that Cohan's musical, Little Johnny Jones is based on Sloan's life story. Tod's brother was Cassius Sloan, sister Mary L. Sloan (Blanche Sloan, aerialist), and his brother was Fremont Sloan. His father was Civil War veteran, Samuel Sloan.	
Phillips Smalley	August 7, 1875	May 2, 1939	American	Actor.	
Roy Smeck	February 6, 1900	April 5, 1994	American	Guitar, banjo, ukulele and Hawaiian guitar virtuoso.	
Smith and Dale			American	Comic duo of Charles Marks (September 6, 1881 – November 16, 1971) and Joseph Sultzer (February 16, 1884 – February 22, 1981).	
Ada "Bricktop" Smith	August 14, 1894	February 1, 1984	American	Singer and dancer.	
Bessie Smith	April 15, 1894	September 26, 1937	American	Legendary blues singer. Smith was ranked as the top performer on the T.O.B.A. circuit in the 1920s.	
Chris Smith	October 12, 1879	October 4, 1949	American	Musician. Songwriter of "Ballin' the Jack."	
Clara Smith	c. 1894	February 2, 1935	American	Blues singer. Smith began working in vaudeville around 1910 and by 1918 was one of the biggest names on the T.O.B.A. circuit.	
"Whispering" Jack Smith	May 31, 1898	May 13, 1950	American	Singer known for his "whispering" style of singing.	
Kate Smith	May 1, 1907	June 17, 1986	American	Singer, known for her renditions of "God Bless America" and "When the Moon Comes Over the Mountain" and for her "Hello, everybody!".	
Mamie Smith	May 26, 1883	September 16, 1946	American	Blues singer. Smith toured nationally as "Mamie Smith and Her Jazz Hounds", in the 1920s.	
Pinetop Smith	June 11, 1904	March 15, 1929	American	Jazz pianist.	
Trixie Smith	1895	September 21, 1943	American	Blues singer. Toured the T.O.B.A. circuits from 1918.	
Willie "The Lion" Smith	November 25, 1897	April 18, 1973	American	Jazz pianist.	
John Philip Sousa	November 6, 1854	March 6, 1932	American	Composer and band conductor.	
Eddie South	November 27, 1904	April 25, 1962	American	Jazz violinist.	
Elsie Southgate	January 23, 1880	May 5, 1946	British	Violinist, billed as "The Royal Violinist."	
Leora Spellman	July 13, 1890	September 4, 1945	American	Singer and actress.	
Victoria Spivey	October 5, 1906	1976	American	Blues singer.	
Ruth St. Denis	April 16, 1889	July 21, 1968	American	Dancer.	
George Stallings	November 17, 1867	May 13, 1929	American	Baseball player who appeared in vaudeville as a monologist.	
Aileen Stanley	1897	March 24, 1982	American	Singer. Had an act with her brother, Stanley & Aileen.	
Paul Stanley (Sonnenburg)	abt. 1847	March 15, 1907	American	Comedian and Composer, who some credit with writing the music for the ditty Ta-ra-ra Boom-de-ay.	
Orville Stamm	June 29, 1893	May 8, 1963	American	Strongman	
John Steel	1895	1971	American	Singer.	
Julius Steger	March 4, 1870	February 25, 1959	American	Actor in a playlet he wrote himself, The Fifth Commandment.	
Harry Steppe	March 1888	November 22, 1943	Russian-American	Actor, Jewish dialect comedian and hobo clown.	
Cal Stewart	1856	1919	American	Comic monologist.	
Dorothy Stickney	June 21, 1896	June 2, 1998	American	Singer and dancer.	
Frank Stokes	December 1887 or January 1888	September 12, 1955	American	Singer, blues musician and blackface minstrel.	
Fred Stone	August 19, 1873	March 6, 1959	American	Acrobat, tightrope walker, minstrel, and actor.	
Charley Straight	January 16, 1891	September 22, 1940	American	Pianist, bandleader and composer.	
Gabby Street	September 30, 1882	February 6, 1951	American	Baseball player who appeared in vaudeville.	
Dana Suesse	December 3, 1909	October 16, 1987	American	Dancer, songwriter, lyricist and pianist.	
Anne Sullivan	April 14, 1866	October 20, 1926	American	Teacher to Helen Keller who appeared with her when she lectured.	
Gus Sun	October 7, 1868	October 1, 1959	American	Juggler and minstrel. Later, the owner of the Gus Sun Circuit.	
Valeska Suratt	June 22, 1882	July 2, 1962	American	Actress.	
Mack Swain	February 16, 1876	August 25, 1935	American	Comedian who later appeared in Mack Sennett's Keystone comedies.	
Blanche Sweet	June 18, 1896	September 6, 1986	American	Actress, Appeared with her parents' vaudeville act at the age of 18 months. She was billed as "Baby Blanche" or "Sweet Little Blanche."	

== T–V ==
Name	Birth	Death	Nationality	Performance notes	Reference
Chief Tahachee	March 4, 1904	June 9, 1978	American	Actor.	
Edith Taliaferro	December 21, 1893	March 2, 1958	American	performed with her sister, Mabel Taliaferro	
Mabel Taliaferro	May 21, 1887	January 24, 1979	American	performed with her sister, Edith Taliaferro	
Eva Tanguay	August 1, 1878	January 11, 1947	Canadian	Singer.	
Julius Tannen	May 16, 1880	January 3, 1965	American	Monologist.	
Daisy Tapley	1882	1925	American	Contralto. Travelled to Britain and played in production of In Dahomey.	
Lilyan Tashman	October 23, 1899	March 21, 1934	American	Actor, singer and dancer. Started out as a principle actress for Gus Edwards and ended up as a Ziegfeld girl.	
Dub Taylor	February 26, 1907	October 3, 1994	American	Actor.	
Eva Taylor	January 22, 1895	October 31, 1977	American	Singer and dancer. Was a "pickaninny" or "pick" for Phina and Her Picks (later Josephine Gassman and Her Pickaninnies).	
Tell Taylor	October 14, 1876	November 24, 1937	American	Singer and songwriter.	
Lou Tellegen	November 26, 1881	October 29, 1934	Dutch	Actor who appeared in a sketch from his play, Blind Youth.	
Fay Templeton	December 25, 1865	October 3, 1939	American	Actress and singer.	
Dame Ellen Terry	February 27, 1847	July 21, 1928	British	Actress who also appeared with her sister, Kate Terry.	
Denman Thompson	October 15, 1833	April 11, 1911	American	Actor.	
Lydia Thompson	February 19, 1836	November 17, 1908	American	Actress.	
Bonnie Thornton	c. 1871	March 13, 1920	American	Singer known as "The Original Tutti-Frutti Girl."	
Richard Thorpe	24 February 1896	January 13, 1961	American	Singer and actor. Later in Hollywood films.	
Howard Thurston	July 20, 1869	April 13, 1936	American	Magician.	
Dox Thrash	1893	1965	American	Actor.	
Three Meyakos			Japanese-American	Song and dance act consisting of siblings Esther Kudara, Florence Kudara, and George Kudara.	
Three Mizunos			Japanese	Jugglers, Acrobats, Equilibrists. Sometimes known as the Mizuno Troupe. Five Japanese Performers from Mikado Mitsuhito's Imperial Theatre.	
Three Stooges			American	A comic trio consisting of brothers Moe (June 19, 1897 – May 4, 1975) and Shemp Howard (March 4, 1895 – November 22, 1955), and friend Larry Fine (October 5, 1902 – January 24, 1975).	
Three X Sisters			American	Harmony singing trio consisting of Pearl Santos, Violet Hamilton, and Jessie Fordyce.	
"Big Bill" Tilden	February 10, 1893	June 5, 1953	American	Tennis player and monologist.	
Vesta Tilley	May 13, 1864	September 16, 1962	British	Male impersonator.	
Tim and Irene			American	Comic duo composed of Tim Ryan (July 5, 1889 – October 22, 1956) and his wife, Irene Ryan (October 17, 1902 – April 26, 1973).	
Herman Timberg	1892	April 16, 1952	American	Comedy monologist who would often exit the stage on all fours and perform trick violin playing.	
Joe Tinker	July 27, 1880	July 27, 1948	American	Baseball player who appeared in vaudeville around 1911.	
Frank Tinney	March 29, 1878	November 28, 1940	American	Blackface comic who would perform trick violin playing.	
Lydia Yeamans Titus	1866	December 30, 1929	American	Character actress and singer.	
Eddie Tolan	September 29, 1908	July 30 or 31, 1967	American	Sprinter who appeared briefly with Bill "Bojangles" Robinson.	
Rudy Toombs	1914	November 28, 1962	American	Song and dance man.	
Raquel Torres	1908	1987	Mexican	Actress.	
Toto	1888	December 15, 1938	Swiss	Clown who performed with his dog, Whisky.	
Patsy Touhey	1865	1923	Irish-American	Player of the uilleann pipes.	
Arthur Tracy	June 25, 1899	October 5, 1997	Russian-American	Singer (baritone) of sentimental songs.	
Doris Eaton Travis	March 14, 1904	May 11, 2010	American	Singer, dancer and Ziegfeld girl.	
Al Treloar	May 11, 1873	February 28, 1960	American	Strong man and weightlifter. Assistant to Eugen Sandow, 1893-1894. Performed with wife Edna Tempest, 1903-1907.	
Andrew Tribble	1879	October 15, 1935	American	African-American comedian and female impersonator.	
Sophie Tucker	January 13, 1884	February 9, 1966	American	Singer, known as "The Last of the Red Hot Mamas."	
Ben Turpin	September 19, 1869	July 1, 1940	American	Comedian.	
Lurene Tuttle	August 29, 1906	May 28, 1986	American	Actress.	
Two Black Crows			American	Blackface comedy duo that starred Charles Mack (1888–1934) and others including John Swor, Bert Swor and George Moran (1881–1949). The duo name changed with each new partner, so Mack began using the name Moran & Mack (The Two Black Crows).	
Grace Tyson	February 6, 1881	October 20, 1941	American	Actress and singer	
Isabelle Urquhart	December 9, 1865	February 7, 1907	American	Contralto and actress	
Myrtle Vail	January 7, 1888	September 18, 1978	American	Tap dancer.	
Rudolph Valentino	May 6, 1895	August 23, 1926	Italian	Ballroom dancer with Bonnie Glass, former dance partner of Clifton Webb's. Later became a major "matinee idol" in silent films.	
Rudy Vallee	July 28, 1901	July 3, 1986	American	Singer, actor and bandleader	
Egbert Van Alstyne	March 4, 1978	July 9, 1951	American	Pianist and songwriter. One of his most well-known songs is "In the Shade of the Old Apple Tree."	
Van and Schenck	August 12, 1886	March 12, 1968	American	Comic and musical duo composed of Gus Van (August 12, 1886 – March 12, 1968) and Joe Schenck (c. 1891 – June 28, 1930).	
Woody Van Dyke	March 21, 1889	February 5, 1943	American	Child actor, later became renowned for directing such films as Trader Horn, Tarzan the Ape Man and The Thin Man.	
Frank Van Hoven	1887	December 1929	American	Magician.	
Billy B. Van	August 3, 1871	November 16, 1950	American	Comedian.	
Clarice Vance	March 14, 1871	August 24, 1961	American	Singer.	
Gertrude Vanderbilt	1880	December 18, 1960	American	Singer and dancer.	
Vasco	1871	May 9, 1925	British	Magician.	
Dai Vernon	June 11, 1894	1992	Canadian	Magician known for his card tricks.	
Jules Vernon	April 2, 1867	May 17, 1937	British	Ventriloquist.	
Vesta Victoria	November 26, 1873	April 7, 1951	British	Singer.	
Nedra Volz	June 18, 1908	January 20, 2003	American	Actress who appeared as Baby Nedra.	
Harry Von Tilzer	July 8, 1872	January 10, 1946	American	Pianist and songwriter. Among some of his most well-known sonsg are "Wait 'til the Sun Shines Nellie" and "Bird in a Gilded Cage."	

== W–Z ==
Name	Birth	Death	Nationality	Performance notes	Reference
Ted Waldman	February 12, 1899	February 1, 1987	American	Harmonica player.	
Fats Waller	May 21, 1904	December 15, 1943	American	Pianist and songwriter. Waller toured in vaudeville as an accompanist beginning around 1919. Among his many songs are "Ain't Misbehavin'" and "Honeysuckle Rose."	
Dorothy Walters	1877	April 17, 1934	American	Actress.	
Henry B. Walthall	March 16, 1878	June 17, 1936	American	Actor.	
Florence Walton	1890	January 7, 1981	American	Dancer.	
Fannie Ward	June 22, 1872	January 27, 1952	American	Actress.	
Hap Ward	July 1868	January 3, 1944	American	Comedian, dancer, and actor who was one half of the comedy duo Ward and Vokes.	
Frederick Warde	February 23, 1851	February 17, 1935	British	Shakespearean actor, monologist and actor in playlets.	
David Warfield	1866	1951	American	Actor.	
Fred Waring	June 9, 1900	July 29, 1984	American	Bandleader of the band Fred Waring and his Pennsylvanians	
Jethro Warner	July 26, 1874	April 13, 1931	American	Performed with his wife as Floyd and Warner.	
Warren Lloyd Warrener	Dec 23, 1889	Dec 4, 1961	American	Actor, Singer	
George Dewey Washington	May 1, 1898		American	Singer.	
Ethel Waters	October 31, 1896	September 1, 1977	American	Singer and actress. Waters made a very easy transition from vaudeville to nightclubs. Waters is credited with making the song, "Stormy Weather (song)" popular.	
Donald "Monk" Watson			American	Actor.	
Kitty Watson & Fanny Watson			American	Comic sister act with Kitty (March 14, 1886 – March 3, 1967) and Fanny Watson (1885 – May 17, 1970).	
Castor Watt	March 7, 1858	August 6, 1932	German	Internationally known quick-change-artist, actor, mimic, humorist. Official name Paul Burwig. Engagements throughout Europe and America (New York City, Olympia Theatre, 1896).	
Hinda Wausau	1906	1980	American	Chorus girl who became a star of striptease and burlesque.	
Ned Wayburn	March 30, 1874	September 2, 1942	American	Singer and dancer.	
Guy Weadick	1885	1953	American	Wild West performer and, with his wife (Weadick and LaDue), creator of the "Stampede Act."	
Clifton Webb	November 19, 1889	October 13, 1966	American	Actor and dancer partnered in the 1920s with Mary Hay. The Webb and Hay played the Palace in January 1929.	
Weber and Fields			German-American	Comic duo composed of Lew Fields (January 1, 1867 – July 20, 1941) and Joe Weber (August 11, 1867 – May 10, 1942).	
Ben Welch		September 2, 1926	American	Jewish comic.	
Niles Welch	July 29, 1888	November 21, 1976	American	Actor.	
Señor Wences	April 17, 1896	April 20, 1999	Spanish-American	Ventriloquist, best known for his appearances on The Ed Sullivan Show.	
Mae West	August 17, 1893	November 22, 1980	American	Actress and comedian, known for breaking the mold with her taboo performances on both stage and screen.	
Roland West	February 20, 1885	May 31, 1952	American	Actor.	
Wheeler and Woolsey			American	Comic duo with Bert Wheeler (April 7, 1895 – January 18, 1968) and Robert Woolsey (August 14, 1888 – October 31, 1938).	
Albert Whelan	May 5, 1875	February 19, 1961	Australian	Eccentric dancer.	
Dan White	March 25, 1908	July 7, 1980	American	Actor.	
George White	1890	October 10, 1968	Canadian-American	Dancer.	
Sammy White	1894	1960	American	Song and dance comedian.	
Thelma White	December 4, 1910	January 11, 2005	American	Dancer with The White Sisters and later as a Ziegfeld girl.	
Paul Whiteman	March 28, 1890	December 29, 1967	American	Bandleader.	
Annabelle Whitford	1878	November 30, 1961	American	Modern dancer.	
Whiting and Burt			American	Song and dance duo consisting of George Whiting (August 6, 1884 – December 18, 1943) and Sadie Burt (? – December 6, 1966).	
Marshall P. Wilder	September 19, 1859	January 10, 1915	American	Hunchbacked dwarf monologist.	
Jess Willard	December 29, 1881	December 15, 1968	Spanish-American	Boxer and actor.	
Bert Williams	November 12, 1874	March 4, 1922	British West Indian	Actor, pantomimist and singer.	
Bransby Williams	1870	1961	British	Actor, comedian and monologist.	
Clarence Williams	October 8, 1898	November 6, 1965	American	Minstrel, singer and pianist.	
Herb Williams	1884	October 1, 1936	American	Comedian.	
Jay Williams	May 31, 1914	July 12, 1978	American	Comedian.	
Willie, West and McGinty			British	Comedy troupe	
Nat M. Wills	July 11, 1873	December 9, 1917	American	"The Happy Tramp" monologist.	
Edith Wilson	1906	March 30, 1981	American	Blues singer.	
Francis Wilson	February 7, 1854	October 7, 1935	American	Minstrel and comedian.	
Walter Winchell	April 7, 1897	February 20, 1972	American	Actor and singer.	
Charles Winninger	May 26, 1884	January 27, 1969	American	Trapeze artist and actor with his family's act, the Winninger Family Concert Co.	
Basil Wolverton	July 9, 1909	December 31, 1978	American	Actor.	
Daisy Wood	September 15, 1877	October 19, 1961	British	Singer and sister to Marie Lloyd.	
Wee Georgie Wood	December 17, 1895	February 19, 1979	British	Midget comedian who played children.	
Bessie Wynn	1876	July 8, 1968	American	"The Lady Dainty of Vaudeville" singer.	
Ed Wynn	November 9, 1886	June 19, 1966	American	Comedian and actor. Known as "The Perfect Fool."	
Gus Yorke	February 14, 1861	December 27, 1939	American	With Nick Adams in "Yorke and Adams". Command performance of "Potash and Perlmutter" at the Queens Theatre, 14 April 1914.	
Clara Kimball Young	September 6, 1890	October 15, 1960	American	Actress who appeared in a sketch called "The Adorable Wife." Headlined at the Palace, April, 1925.	
Lester Young	August 27, 1909	March 15, 1959	American	Clarinetist and saxophonist.	
Margaret Young	1900	May 3, 1969	American	Singer.	
Henny Youngman	March 16, 1906	February 24, 1998	British-American	Comedian, bandleader and violinist.	
Joe Yule	April 30, 1894	March 30, 1950	Scottish	Comedian and father to Mickey Rooney.	
George Zucco	January 11, 1886	May 28, 1960	British	Character actor who toured with his wife, Frances in a satirical sketch about suffragettes.	
Yetta Zwerling	December 25, 1889	January 17, 1982	Austrian	Actress, performed primarily in Yiddish vaudeville and on the British Music Hall stage. Once she perfected her stage Yiddish, Zwerling worked in Yiddish theatre and in the 1930s in Yiddish film.	

== Sources ==
- Banham, Martin, ed. (1995), The Cambridge Guide to Theatre, Cambridge: Cambridge University Press, ISBN 0-521-43437-8
- Cullen, Frank; Hackman, Florence; McNeilly, Donald (2007), Vaudeville Old & New: An Encyclopedia of Variety Performers in America, New York: Routledge, ISBN 978-0-415-93853-2
- Harrison, Nigel (1988), Songwriters: A Biographical Dictionary with Discographies, Jefferson, North Carolina: McFarland and Co., ISBN 0-7864-0542-2
- Hartnoll, Phyllis, ed. (1983), The Oxford Companion to the Theatre (4th ed.), Oxford: Oxford University Press, ISBN 0-19-211546-4
- Katz, Ephraim (2005), The Film Encyclopedia (5th ed.), New York City: HarperCollins, ISBN 0-06-074214-3
- Kenrick, John (1997–2007), Musicals 101.com: The Cyber Encyclopedia of Musical Theatre, TV and Film
- Kernfeld, Barry Dean, ed. (2002a), A-Fuzz, The New Grove Dictionary of Jazz, vol. 1 (2nd ed.), London: Macmillan, ISBN 1-56159-284-6, OCLC 48420843
- Kernfeld, Barry Dean, ed. (2002b), Gabler-Niewood, The New Grove Dictionary of Jazz, vol. 2 (2nd ed.), London: Macmillan, ISBN 1-56159-284-6, OCLC 163210034
- Kernfeld, Barry Dean, ed. (2002c), Nightclubs-Zwingenberger, The New Grove Dictionary of Jazz, vol. 3 (2nd ed.), London: Macmillan, ISBN 1-56159-284-6
- Larkin, Colin, ed. (1998), The Encyclopedia of Popular Music, vol. VII (3rd ed.), London: Muze, ISBN 1-56159-237-4
- Laurie, Joe Jr. (1953), Vaudeville: From the Honky-tonks to the Palace, New York: Henry Holt
- Slide, Anthony (1994), The Encyclopedia of Vaudeville, Westport, Connecticut: Greenwood Press, ISBN 0-313-28027-4
- Southern, Eileen (1982), Biographical Dictionary of Afro-American and African Musicians, Westport, Connecticut: Greenwood Press, ISBN 0-313-21339-9
- Thomas, Nicholas, ed. (1992), Actors and Actresses, International Dictionary of Films and Filmmakers, vol. 3 (2nd ed.), Detroit: St. James Press, ISBN 1-55862-039-7, OCLC 29295170
