= James Morton =

James Morton may refer to:

== Politics and law ==
- James Morton (Canadian businessman) (1808–1864), Irish-Canadian brewer, manufacturer and politician
- James Madison Morton Sr. (1837–1923), American jurist, justice of the Massachusetts Supreme Judicial Court
- James Madison Morton Jr. (1869–1940), American federal judge
- Jim Morton (politician) (born 1951), Canadian politician
- James Cooper Morton (born 1960), Canadian lawyer and author

== Sports ==
- James Morton (footballer, born 1885) (1885–1926), Scottish footballer
- Jimmy Morton (1894–1916), Scottish footballer
- Jim Morton (Australian footballer) (1905–1999), Australian rules footballer
- Jim Morton (footballer, born 1956), Scottish footballer
- James Morton (footballer, born 1999), English footballer

== Others ==
- Jim Morton (American writer), San Francisco-based film and pop culture writer
- James St. Clair Morton (1824–1864), Union Army general during the American Civil War
- Sir James Morton (chemist) (1867–1943), Scottish chemist, creator of light-fast dyes
- James Ferdinand Morton Jr. (1870–1941), American political activist
- James C. Morton (1884–1942), American actor
- James J. Morton (1861–1938), American vaudeville comedian
- James Parks Morton (1930–2020), American Episcopal priest, founder of the Interfaith Center of New York
- James Morton (baker) (born 1991), Scottish celebrity baker
- James Morton (physician) (fl. 2000s–present), Australian physician and autism advocate

== See also ==
- James Douglas, 1st Earl of Morton (1426–1493), 4th Lord of Dalkeith, was created the 1st Earl of Morton in 1458
- James Douglas, 3rd Earl of Morton (died 1548), grandson of the above
- James Douglas, 4th Earl of Morton (c. 1525–1581), regent of Scotland
- James Douglas, 14th Earl of Morton (1702–1768), president of the Royal Society
