= Donald Watson (disambiguation) =

Donald Watson (1910–2005) was an English animal rights advocate and founder of the Vegan Society.

Donald or Don Watson may also refer to:

- Donald Watson (rugby union) (1872–1958), English-born New Zealand rugby union player
- Donald "Monk" Watson (1894–1981), American vaudeville performer
- Donald Watson (artist) (1918–2005), Scottish ornithologist and wildlife artist
- Don Watson (born 1949), Australian author
- Don Watson (Australian footballer) (1905–1948), Australian rules footballer
- Don Watson (English footballer) (born 1932), English football inside forward
- Don Alonzo Watson (1807–1892), American businessman and philanthropist, helped found Western Union

== See also ==
- Watson (surname)
