= Tonight and Every Night =

1945 film by Victor Saville

- Directed by: Victor Saville
- Written by: Abem Finkel; Lesser Samuels
- Based on: Heart of a City; 1942 play by Lesley Storm
- Produced by: Victor Saville
- Starring: Rita Hayworth; Lee Bowman; Janet Blair; Marc Platt
- Cinematography: Rudolph Maté
- Edited by: Viola Lawrence
- Music by: Marlin Skiles; Morris Stoloff; George Duning
- Distributed by: Columbia Pictures
- Release date: January 9, 1945
- Running time: 92 minutes
- Country: United States
- Language: English

Tonight and Every Night is a 1945 American musical film directed by Victor Saville and starring Rita Hayworth, Lee Bowman and Janet Blair. The film portrays wartime romance and tragedy in a London musical show, loosely modelled on the Windmill Theatre in Soho, that determined not to miss a single performance during the Blitz. Hayworth plays an American showgirl who falls in love with an RAF pilot played by Bowman.

The film was adapted from Lesley Storm's 1942 play Heart of a City. It was used by Columbia Pictures as a Technicolor vehicle for Hayworth after her success with Cover Girl (1944), directed by Charles Vidor. A major highlight of the film is Hayworth in the "You Excite Me" number, often cited as one of her best performances.

The film was nominated for two Academy Awards at the 18th Academy Awards: Best Scoring of a Musical Picture and Best Original Song (for "Anywhere").

== Plot ==
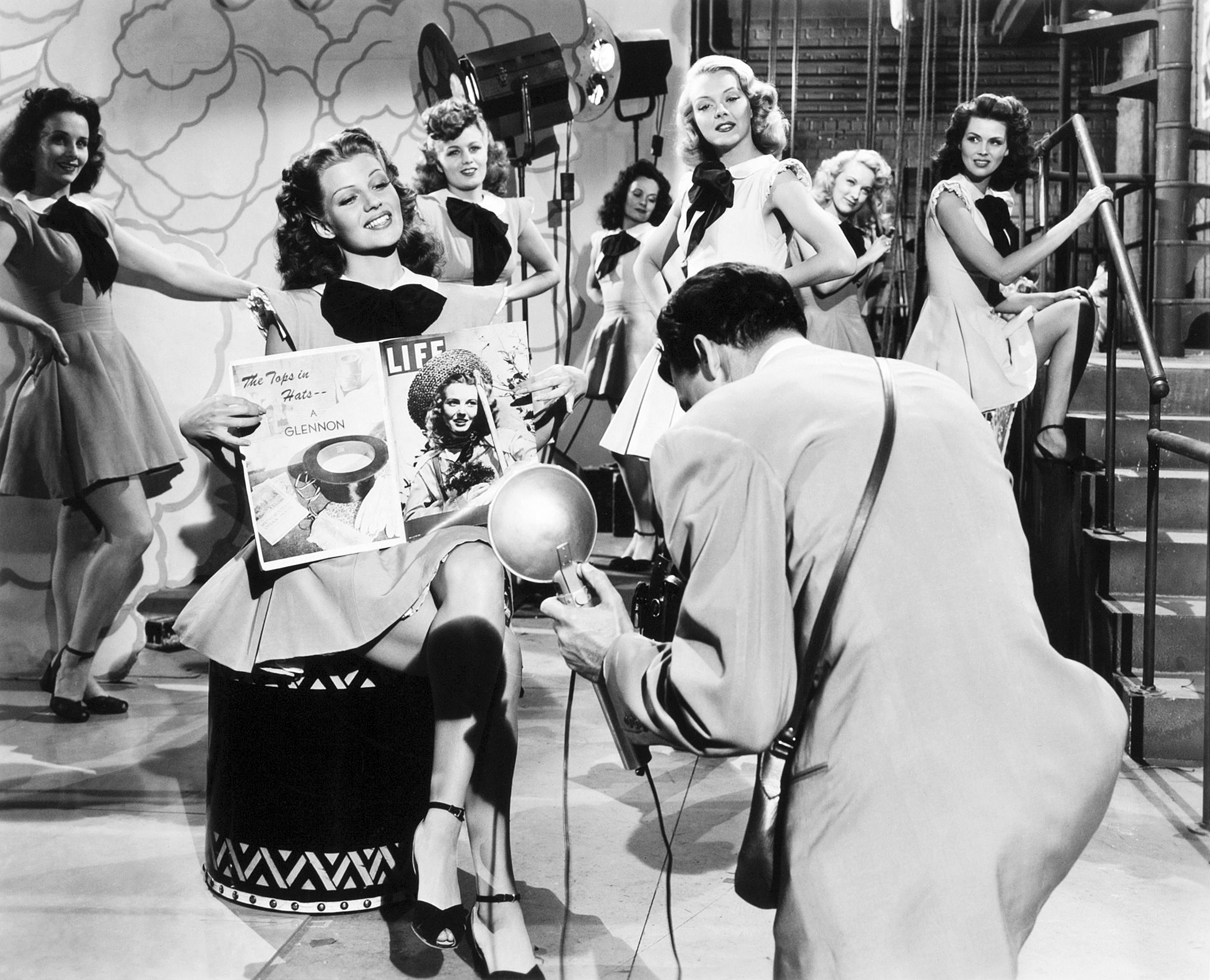
Promotional still from the film with Rita Hayworth as a musical theatre performer, and Jim Bannon as a Life photographer

Near the end of the war, a photographer from Life magazine comes to the Music Box Theatre in London to write a story about the music hall that never missed putting on a performance during the Blitz.

Stage manager Sam Royce recalls the halcyon days at the beginning of the war: Theatrical impresario May "Tolly" Tolliver is rehearsing her performers when dancer Tommy Lawson comes to audition. Although Tommy is a naturally gifted dancer, he improvises all his steps and consequently, Tolly refuses to hire him. Taking pity on him, American members of the troupe, Rosalind Bruce and Judy Kane, teach him their routines, and he wins a part in the show.

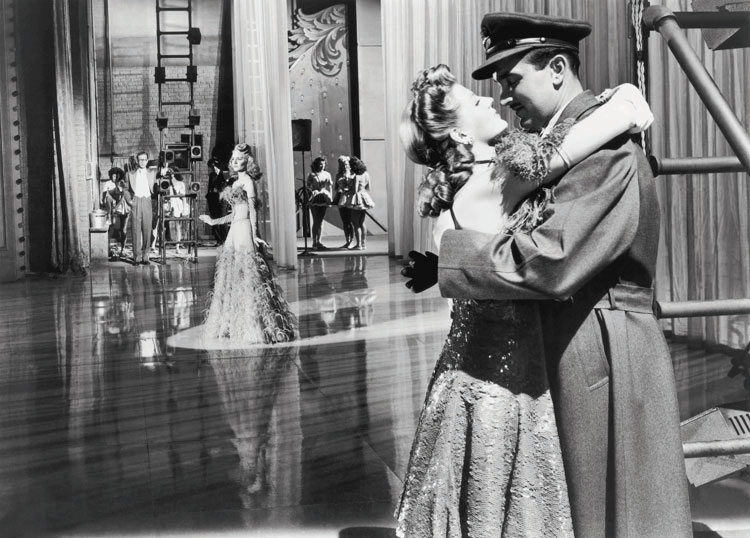
Hayworth and Lee Bowman as an RAF pilot

One night, RAF pilot Paul Lundy comes to the theater and is infatuated with Ros. When German planes discharge their bombs over the theater, the audience and performers take refuge in the basement, and there Paul meets Ros and invites her to dinner. She refuses his invitation, but after the raid, she and Judy stop by the neighborhood restaurant, and Paul is waiting with champagne. Ros begins to date him, but when he tricks her into coming to his apartment by promising to introduce her to a non-existent soldier from her home town of St. Louis, she feels betrayed and refuses to talk to him.

Desperate to see Ros, Paul convinces his group captain to request that the Music Box troupe appear at the upcoming RAF theatrical. At the RAF show, Paul begs Ros to forgive him, and when he is called away on a mission, she relents and accepts his confession of love. Tommy, who is also in love with Ros, begins to drink to dull the pain of rejection. After returning from his assignment, Paul tells Ros that he must leave again the next morning, and the two plan to spend an intimate evening at Paul's apartment. When they arrive, however, they find that Paul's building has been flattened in a German bombing raid.

The next day, Paul is planning to propose to Ros when he is ordered to leave immediately on a secret assignment. Two weeks pass without word from him, causing Ros to worry. One night, she sees several flyers from his squadron, and when they tell her that the entire squadron has been on a two-week leave, she believes that Paul has lost interest in their romance.

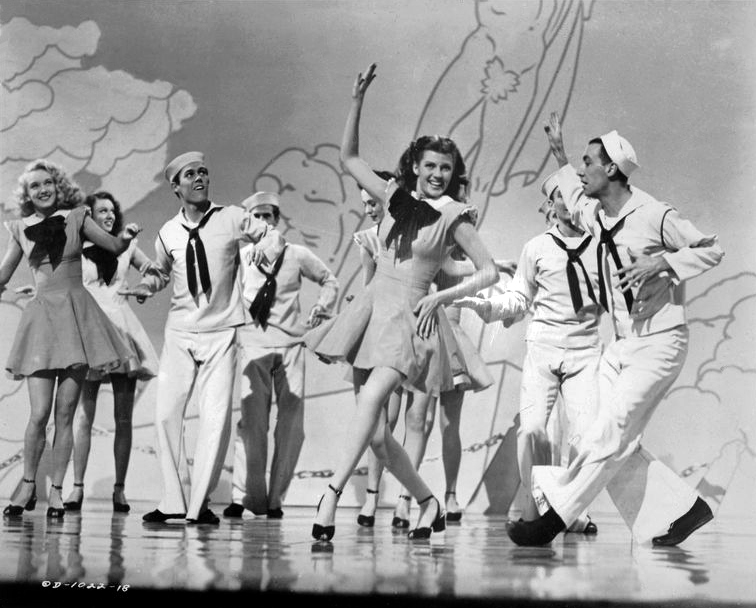
Hayworth and choreographer Jack Cole (as an uncredited dancer)

When Ros receives a note from Paul's father, Reverend Gerald Lundy, asking to meet her after the show that night, she assumes that he has sent him as an emissary to terminate their relationship. She is relieved when he explains it all and shows her a Bible that Paul had sent to him. The Reverend opens it to the page marked by Ros's picture, showing her a highlighted passage, proposing marriage. The Reverend then proposes for his absent son and welcomes Ros to the family.

Upon learning of Paul's proposal, Tommy jealously predicts that Ros will desert the theater. When he returns soon after and asks Ros to honeymoon in Canada, she refuses to leave the troupe until Tommy offers his congratulations and insists that she go. Afterward, Judy, who is secretly in love with Tommy, goes to console him at the pub, and after drinking a toast to Ros, they kiss. Their happiness is short-lived, however, as a German bomb strikes the pub, killing them both. Despite the tragedy, the night's performance goes on, and as Ros sings Judy's song, she determines to stay with the show.

== Cast ==
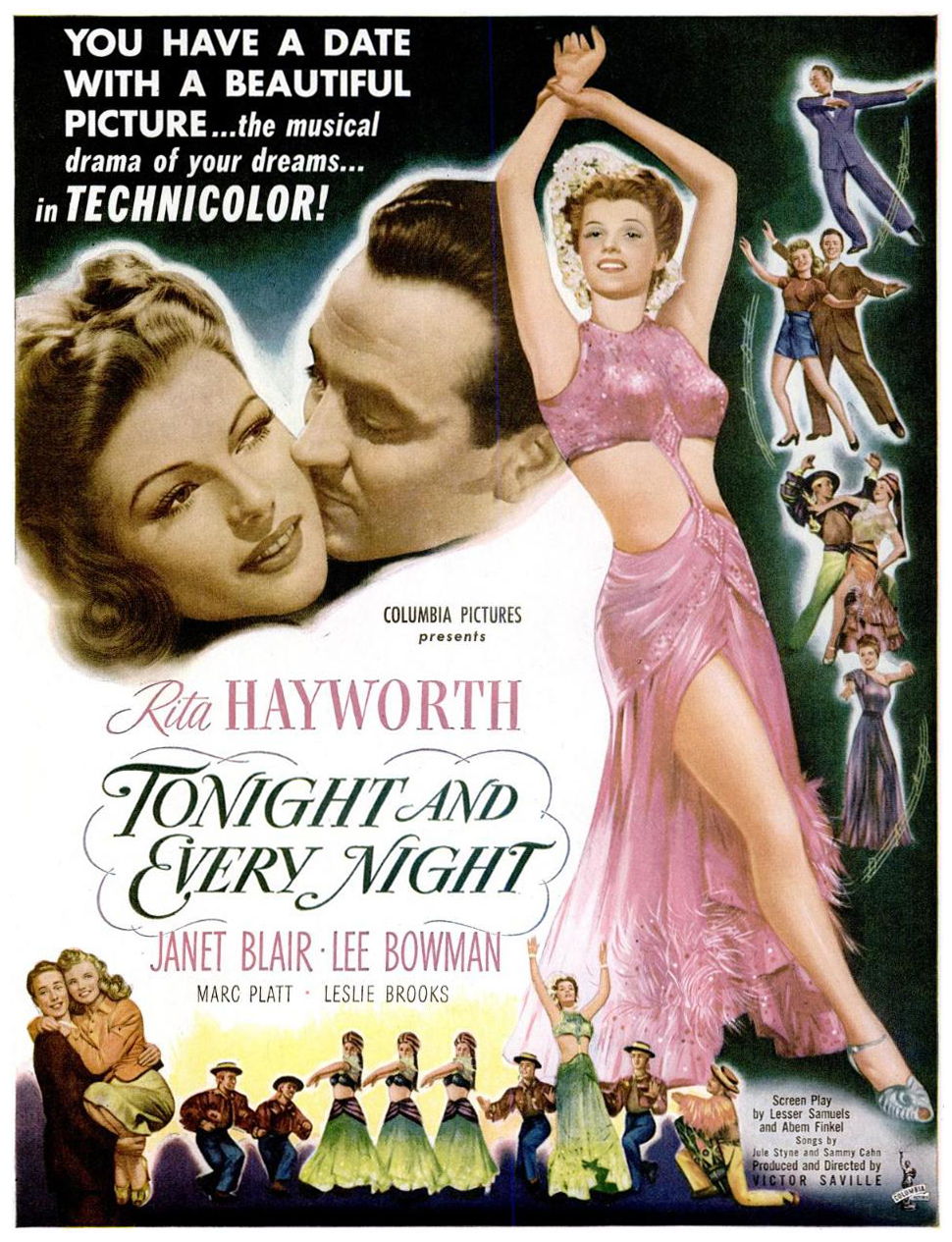
Advertisement (January 1945)

- Rita Hayworth as Rosalind Bruce (singing voice was dubbed by Martha Mears)
- Lee Bowman as Squadron Leader Paul Lundy
- Janet Blair as Judy Kane
- Marc Platt as Tommy Lawson
- Leslie Brooks as Angela
- Professor Lamberti as Fred, The Great Waldo
- Dusty Anderson as Toni
- Stephen Crane as Observer Leslie Wiggins
- Jim Bannon as Life Photographer
- Florence Bates as May Tolliver
- Ernest Cossart as Sam Royce
- Richard Haydn as Specialty
- Philip Merivale as Reverend Gerald Lundy
- Patrick O'Moore as David Long
- C. Montague Shaw as Old Bobby (uncredited)
- Shelley Winters as Bubbles (uncredited)

== Reception ==
The New York Times was pleased with the film: "Victor Saville has shaped a very pleasant and sentimentally romantic musical film...He has got some melodious songs for it, he has dressed it in lovely pastel shades and he has given it all to Rita Hayworth and a most agreeable cast to play....By the grace of some able script writing and Mr. Saville's directorial care, the story never drops to maudlin bathos. In fact, it keeps a rather gallant air. And it permits an appropriate succession of music and dance interludes....It is pleasant to see a color picture that avoids the shocking, livid hues and gratifies the visual sense rather with mellow, sophisticated shades....It is nice to be able to recommend it for a musical hour and a half."
