= Alfred Latell =

- Signed publicity photo of Latell as Bonzo the Dog, 1931, given to Duke Ellington
- Born: Alfred J. Lee; January 19, 1887; Bay St. Louis, Mississippi, U.S.
- Died: April 4, 1951 (aged 64); Park Ridge, Illinois, U.S.
- Other name: Al Latell
- Occupations: Vaudeville entertainer, animal impressionist
- Years active: c. 1902–1950

Alfred Latell (born Alfred J. Lee; January 19, 1887 – April 4, 1951) was an American vaudeville entertainer, who performed impressions of animals such as dogs, cats and birds.

== Life and career ==
He was born in Bay St. Louis, Mississippi. During his early teens he was seen performing on street corners by a local priest, who hired him to put on shows at local churches. He became a professional entertainer in 1902, and specialized in impressions of animals, dressing in appropriate costumes with internal wires and strings to add expression. In 1905 he appeared in dog costume in a Broadway show, The Babes and the Baron, and by 1907 he was well established on the vaudeville circuit.

In 1909, he was quoted as saying:

To play the part of a dog and not to buffoon him, one is obliged to make a close study of his every action. The dog is so close to mankind that he is known more intimately than any other of the domestic beasts, with the exception possibly of the horse…The cat is a difficult animal to impersonate, though not so much as the dog, because of the fact of its slower movements. I have gone out at night with my cat suit on and have sat for hours watching the smaller back yard cats as they stalked along the fence or sat watching the moon rise o’er some neighboring buildings..... The parrot was one of my first bird impersonations, and I found it one of the most difficult of all, because of its crouching posture and the consequent tendency to fall over while walking. There are nine strings which have to be operated in working the head, bill and wings, and the work is laborious in every sense of the word.

Latell toured widely and occasionally appeared in Broadway shows including The Cohan Revue of 1916. His most popular character was as Bonzo the Dog. He was supported in his act, initially by his first wife, Estelle, and later by his second wife, Lucille, who used the stage name Sylvan Dell. His appeal continued through to the 1930s, and he toured in Australia. In 1943, credited as Al Latell, he appeared as Bonzo in an early "soundie" for Minoco Productions, Puttin' On the Dog, with singer Iris Howard.

Latell died in Park Ridge, Illinois in 1951 at the age of 64, and was buried in an unmarked grave.
