= Jethro Warner =

Jethro J. Warner
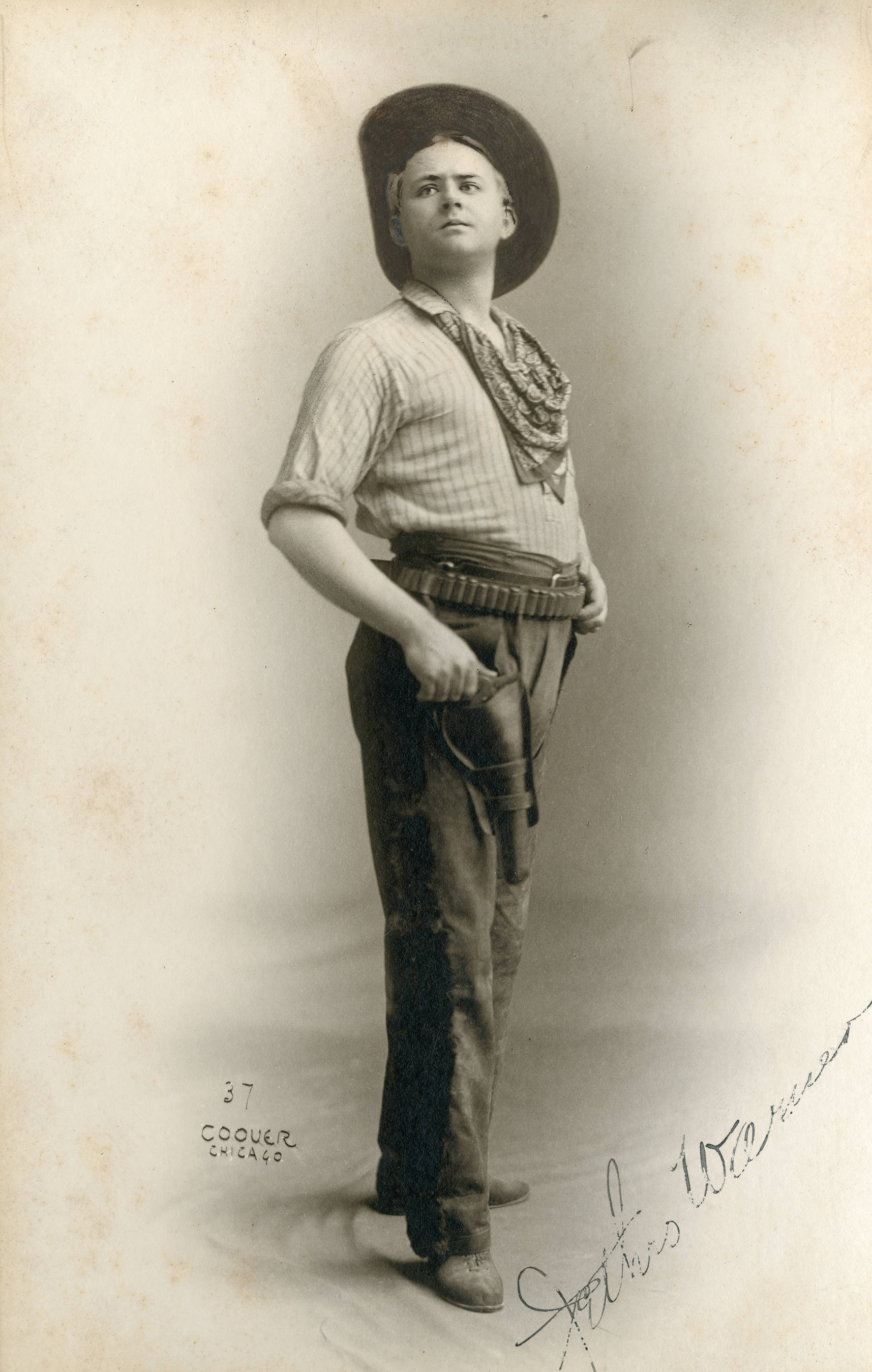
- Warner in 1905
- Born: July 26, 1874; Dover, New Hampshire, U.S.
- Died: April 13, 1931 (aged 56); Stuyvesant Polyclinic Hospital; Manhattan, New York, U.S.
- Occupation: Actor
- Parent(s): Franklin Warner; Elizabeth Blane

Jethro J. Warner (July 26, 1874 – April 13, 1931) was an American vaudeville and Broadway theatre performer. In vaudeville he was part of the team of Floyd and Warner with his wife.

== Biography ==
He was born on July 26, 1874, in Dover, New Hampshire, to Franklin Warner and Elizabeth Blane.

In vaudeville he was part of the team of Floyd and Warner with his wife. After vaudeville he became a performer on Broadway.

In 1927 he appeared in Oh, Earnest! as Reverend Canon Chasuble. The musical comedy was based on Oscar Wilde's The Importance of Being Earnest. He appeared with Eddie Cantor in Whoopee!, the 1928 musical comedy based on Owen Davis's The Nervous Wreck. In 1930 he appeared in Gold Braid as Colonel Billings. He appeared in This Man's Town in 1930. The play was produced by George Jessel. He also appeared in several motion pictures.

He died on April 13, 1931, at the Stuyvesant Polyclinic Hospital in Manhattan, New York City. He was under the care of the Actors' Fund. He was buried in Kensico Cemetery in Valhalla, New York.

== Broadway ==
- Gold Braid (1930) as Colonel Billings
- This Man's Town (1930) as George, produced by George Jessel
- The Prince of Pilsen (1930) as a revival
- Hello Tokio (1929)
- Caravan (1928) as Detective Leland
- Killers (1928) as both Flynn and the warden
- Whoopee! (1928) with Eddie Cantor
- Oh, Earnest! (1927) as Reverend Canon Chasuble
- The Tenderfoot (1904)
- The Girl From Paris (1896)
