= Macarte Sisters =

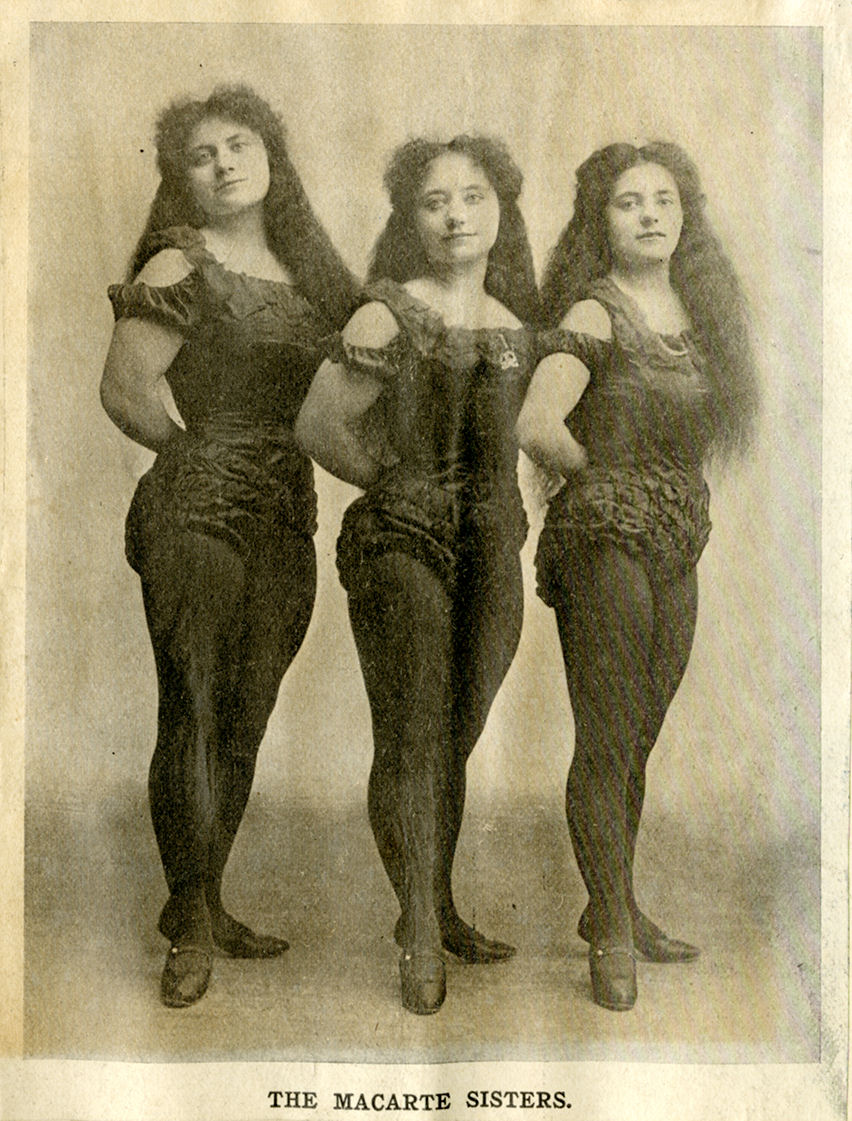
The Macarte Sisters (l-r) Cecilia, Julia and Adelaide (c. 1906)

The Macarte Sisters were a trapeze and high wire act of the late 19th and early 20th-centuries noted for their feats of strength during their performance.

== Early life ==
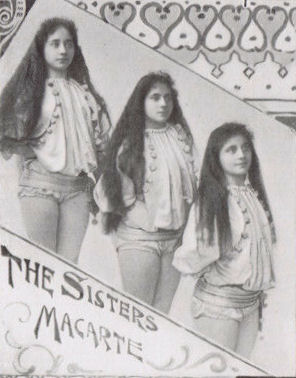
The Sisters Macarte in The Sporting & Theatrical Journal (1897)

They were born into a dynasty of acrobatic and circus performers dating back at least to the early 19th-century (they claimed to the early 18th) who all adopted the surname Macarte in place of their actual surname of Macarthy. An earlier generation of females in the family - their aunts- were using the stage name 'Sisters Macarte' from at least 1870.

Their parents were Regina née Mauthner (1860–1892), a Budapest-born Hungarian acrobat and dancer with the Hungarian ballet, and Lambeth-born Henry Macarthy (1853–1924), a circus acrobat who had been performing since the age of 6. They married in the British Embassy in Vienna in 1877. Their grandparents Michael 'John' Macarthy (1820–1856) and Marie Elizabeth Macarte née Ginnett (1827–1892) ran Macarte's Monster Circus in the 1850s. It is claimed that another relative was Thomas Macarte (1839–1872), known as Massarti the Lion Tamer, who performed with a travelling lion act. Performing his act in Bolton in 1872 he was attacked by the lions but despite his attempts to fight them off was dragged away and killed.

The four diminutive sisters (the tallest was just 5 feet 1½ inches in height) were: Julia Macarthy (1878–1958); Adelaide Macarthy (1879–1908); Cecilia Macarthy (1881–after 1939); and Harriet 'Harrie' Macarthy (1889–1955), who was not part of the act. Harriet's son Peter Macarte was an actor in the 1950s. A fifth sister, Blanche Macarthy, died in infancy. All the sisters were born in Hamburg in Germany. On the 1891 British census Henry and Regina Macarte and their three oldest daughters were all listed as 'Theatrical Professionals'. In 1922 Cecilia Macarte married David Carter.

== Theatrical career ==
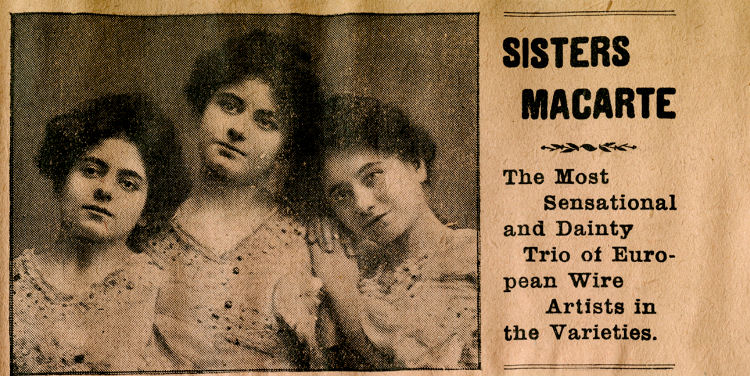
Ad for the Sisters Macarte - “The Most Sensational and Dainty Trio of European Wire Artists in the Varieties" (c. 1906)

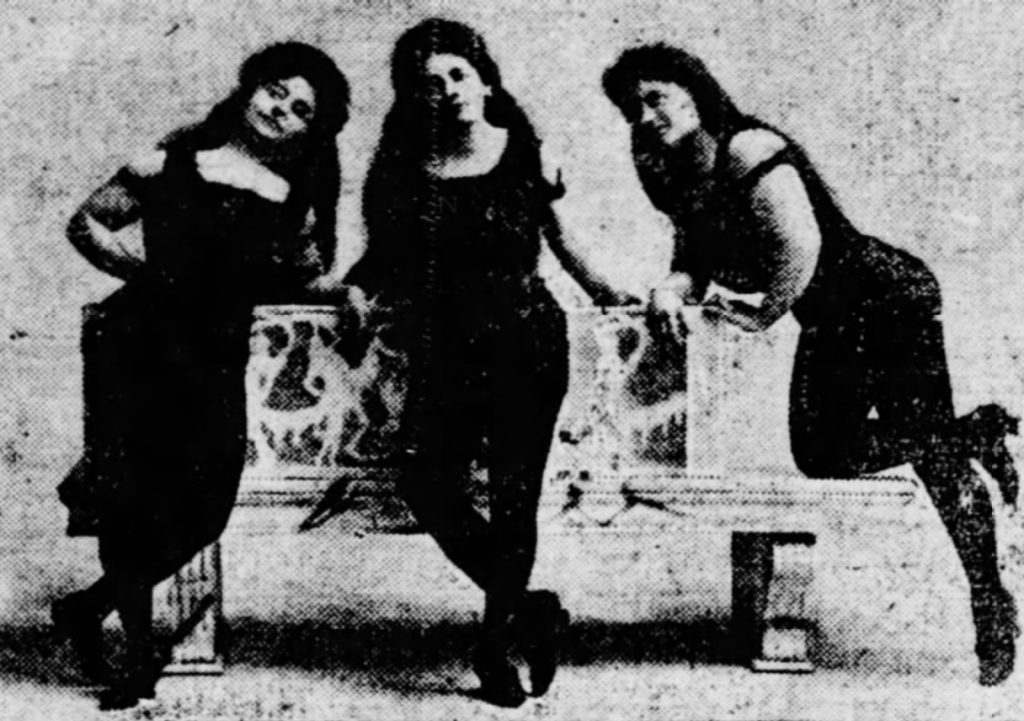
The Sisters Macarte in the St Louis Post Dispatch (1906)

The earliest record of their act dates to an appearance in London in 1893.

Of their tour of the United States between 1897 and 1899 the St Louis Post Dispatch wrote:

THREE STRONG GIRLS

SISTERS MACARTE HAVE MUSCLES ALMOST OF IRON

COME OF A FAMOUS FAMILY

Their Remarkable Work as Equilibrists and Acrobats - Thay Are Young and Single

Nearly every patron of vaudeville has seen and admired the three Sisters Macarte, the pocket Junos who perform marvelous feets [sic] on the slack wire. The striking similarity in the faces and figures of the trio has been commented on frequently and many people are curious to know how it happened that three girls so much alike in physique should be grouped together as professional gymnasts. That they really are sisters no one who has seen them need be told, but it is not until one gets close to them and talks to them that one realizes that the similarity between them is not as great physically as it appears to be mentally.

There are other interesting things to be learned about the Misses Macarte if you can get a physical interview with them. One of these is that they are not nearly as tall as they look.

A Post-Dispatch reporter, who had talked to the sisters and had obtained their measurements and had been astonished to find them so much smaller than they appeared from the auditorium of Forest Park Highlands, asked several persons to give an estimate of their height. Not one guessed less than five feet eight inches for the tallest of the three, nor less than five feet six inches for the other two. One man insisted that the largest sister must be six feet high.

As a matter of fact, the tallest of the three is 5 feet 1½ inches high and the other two are four feet 11½ each. The tallest is the youngest, the heaviest and the strongest. She is Cecilia. Her age is 17; her weight 135 pounds. Her eyes are light gray and her hair, like her sisters', is dark brown and of luxuriant growth.

Julia is the eldest of the sisters. She is 21 years old; weighs 116 pounds and has eyes and hair like Cecilia. Adelaide is 20 years old and is the exact height and weight of Julia. Cover their heads and it would hardly be possible to tell one of them from the other. Adelaide has very dark–and very bright–brown eyes, however, and her neck is hardly as thick as either Julia's or Cecilia's. That is because she has not developed her jaws and they have. They swing head downward from horizontal bars, each with the end of a slack wire in her mouth, and Adelaide balances herself on the wire. In that position all three make music on mandolin and guitar, or if it be night, Adelaide does a fire dance on the wire.

Wonderful as is the muscular development of these girls, it does not obtrude itself on the vision. Their arms and legs are large, but not out of proportion to their bodies, and they taper gracefully. There are no knots of muscle visible. In fact, to the eye they are such limbs as any young woman might desire to have. Yet they are stronger than those of most men.

The development of the muscles of the jaw and neck in Julia and Cecilia is prodigious. You can no more feel the jaw bone of one of those girls than you can the bone of a blacksmith's arm by touching the biceps muscle. The breadth that is noticeable in the lower part of their faces is owing neither to the osseous formation nor to fleshy tissue; it is simply big tough muscles. Adelaide has a powerful neck and jaws herself, but she is a weakling in that respect as compared to the other two.

In manner the sisters are modest and artless. They are cheerful little women and laugh a good deal. Adelaide is the business woman of the three, and if you want to know anything about them their father, who manages them, will refer you to her.

"See Addie," he says; "she can tell you better than I can. She does the talking for the family." When you "see Addie" she will tell you that neither of the sisters is married and neither wishes to be.

"Aren't we better off as it is?" she will say. "We enjoy our work; papa looks after us and we have everything we want. We are not going to be bothered with husbands, are we, girls?" And the other two sisters laugh and say they are satisfied to remain as they are.

Further, Miss "Addie" will tell you that they came of a race of show folks. They are English and French and can run back nearly 200 years through a line of ancestral acrobats. Their grandmother was Madame Macarte, a world-renowned French bare-back and circus performer. Their father, Harry Macarte, was the champion tumbler of England 25 years ago; their uncle, Fred Macarte, trains dogs and monkeys and that they have divers cousins and other relatives in various branches of the profession.

"Our public performances are only a small part of our work," says Adelaide. "We exercise several hours each day and are constantly practicing new acts."

The father of the girls is a small man, apparently 25 years old. He says he is 50.

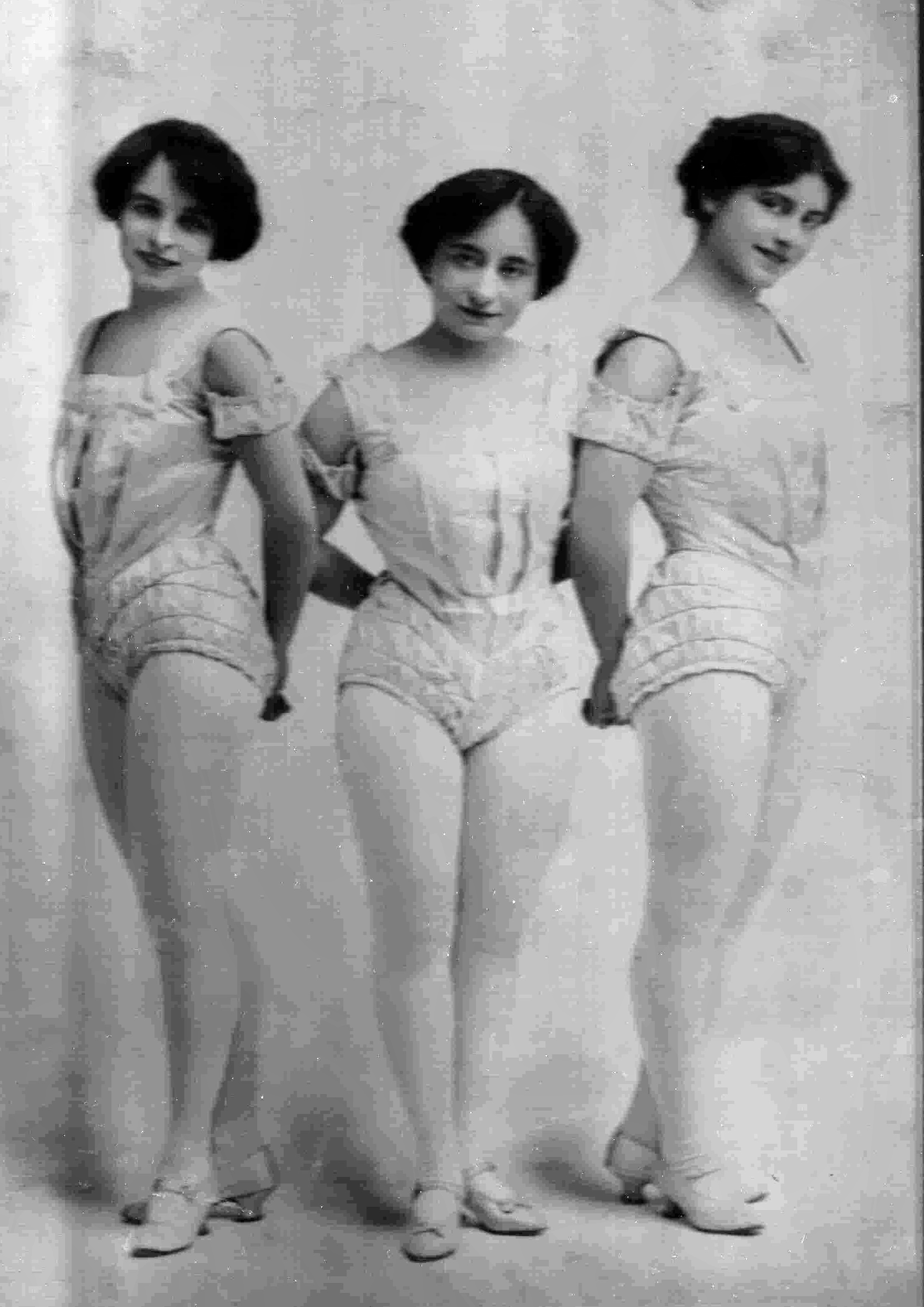
The Sisters Macarte c. 1910

In early 1900 the Sisters were in Australia before returning to Britain where they appeared on Variety bills and in music halls across Britain until 1905 before heading to the United States where they toured between 1906 and 1907 to great acclaim. As described above, the finale of the Macarte Sisters acrobatic act involved two of the sisters holding the slack wire between their teeth while the third sister walked across it. The sisters toured America and Australia where audiences were amazed at their strength. It was claimed that doctors had inspected their neck and facial muscles to check for trickery. After the death of Adelaide Macarte in New York in 1908 she was replaced by 1910 by the acrobat and circus performer Rosie Foote (1892–after 1945) but the act continued to be billed as the Sisters Macarte. In 1911 the sisters were performing at the Iowa State Fair.

In 1912 The Stage recorded that a new music hall organisation called The Ferrets had been launched in December 1911, the aim of which was "to promote sociability and good fellowship among the ladies of the music hall profession and their friends." Formed in December 1911, the group was structured along the lines of the Grand Order of Water Rats, the membership of which was and is restricted to men in the entertainment industry. The twelve founding Ferrets included Ida Rose as Queen Ferret, Julia Macarte as Princess Ferret, Mrs. Arthur Weir as Bank Ferret, Mabel Mavis as Musical Ferret and Mrs. N Alva as Scribe Ferret.

== Later career ==
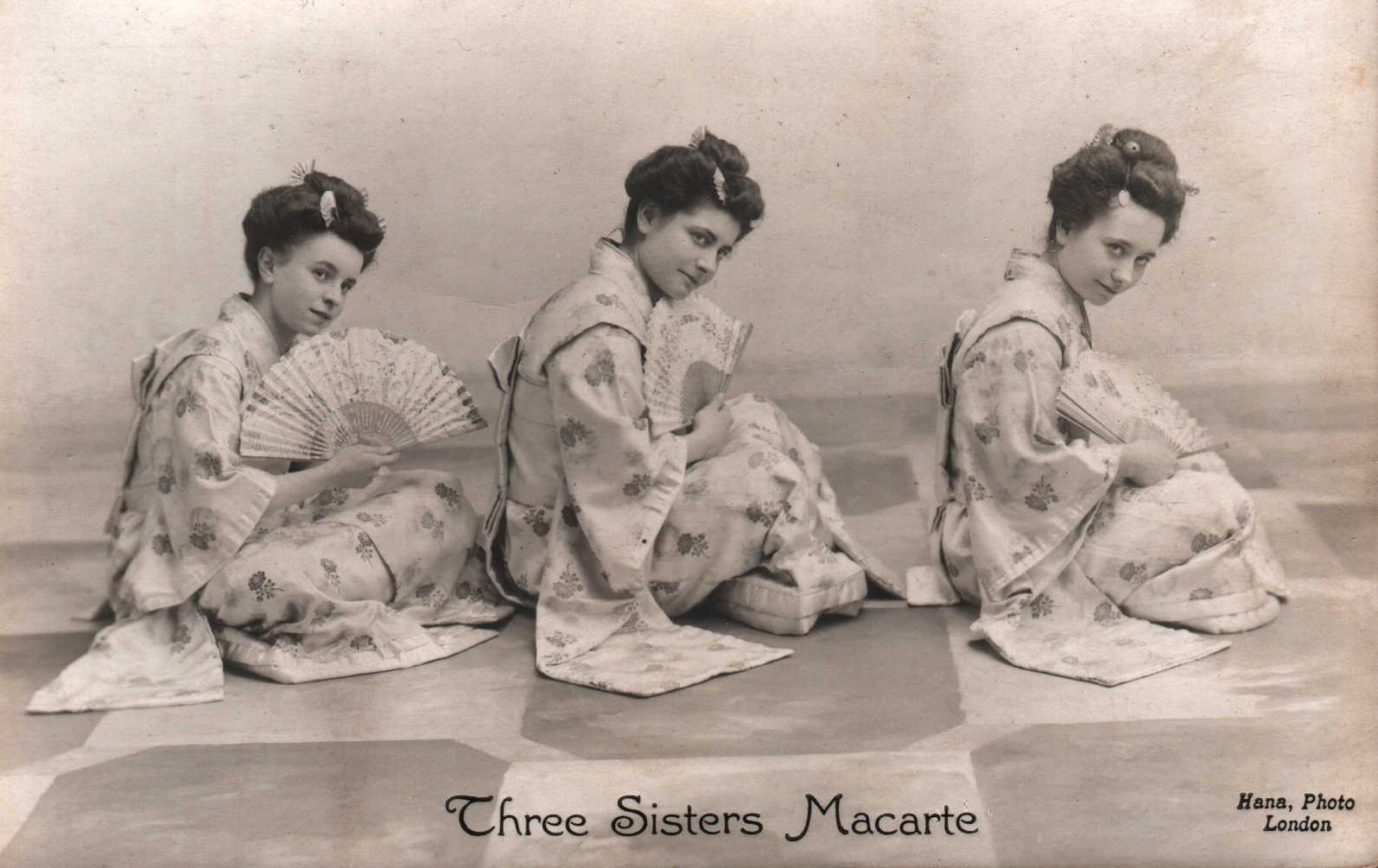
The Macarte Sisters in costume for their act 'The Land of the Lotus' (1912)

Between 1910 in Canada and 1912 in Britain the Macarte Sisters were performing in a Japanese-style act billed as 'The Land of the Lotus', including at the London Pavilion - the costumes of which at least were influenced by the operetta The Mikado. However, various press reports state that the sisters removed their kimono straight after the opening musical number.

In late 1912 and early 1913 the Sisters were touring Australia where their act was described as "unique, and as graceful as it is clever". In an interview for the Sydney, Australia newspaper The Sun, Julia Macarte was recorded as saying, "And don't ask us what King George asked me. He wanted to know if we were suffragettes." "We aren't," replied Rosie Foote. "We aren't in any league against it, but we just don't believe in it that's all. We're neutral." Julia Macarte added, "I belong to only one league. I'm vice-president of the Music Hall Ladies' Guild. It's a benevolent society, for distressed artists." In 1916 the Sisters toured South Africa.
