= Jim Morton (Australian footballer) =

Australian rules footballer, born 1905

Personal information
- Full name: Joseph Reginald Morton
- Born: 25 October 1905; Collingwood, Victoria
- Died: 30 March 1999 (aged 93)

Playing career^{1}
Years	Club	Games (Goals)
1927	North Melbourne	1 (0)
- ^{1} Playing statistics correct to the end of 1927.

Joseph Reginald "Jim" Morton (25 October 1905 – 30 March 1999) was an Australian rules footballer who played with North Melbourne in the Victorian Football League (VFL).
