= Bessie Lamb =

American vaudeville performer

Bessie Lamb (c.1879 – October 30, 1907) was an American vaudeville performer.

She grew up in Cincinnati, Ohio, and started performing on stage at an early age. In 1895 she was described as a "pretty little child danseuse and singer", and in 1901 as a "capital singer of coon songs". She is credited with having introduced ragtime music to vaudeville, in her performances in Cincinnati. A newspaper obituary said: "Her wonderful mimicry and singing established her reputation, and she subsequently went on the road, being prominently identified with the Reilly & Woods' and Hurtig & Seamon's shows for a number of seasons."

She died in Cincinnati in 1907, aged about 28, after several months of illness.
