= James Cooper Morton =

James Cooper Morton, C.S., LL.M. (born 1960) was once a Canadian lawyer with political aspirations, teaching law part-time, blogging and writing in the legal and popular press. In June 2018, he was charged with two counts of forgery of court documents, uttering forged documents, attempting to obstruct justice, signing what purported to be an affidavit without authority, bigamy, and procuring a feigned marriage. The Law Society of Ontario suspended Mr. Morton from practicing law in August 2018 and he pled guilty to criminal charges in April 2019.

== Biography ==
=== Early life ===
Morton was born in Painesville, Ohio, and raised near Hamilton, Ontario. He received a B.Sc. from the University of Western Ontario, an LL.B. from Osgoode Hall Law School and an LL.M. from University of Leicester. Morton graduated from Osgoode as Silver Medallist, clerked with the Chief Justice of Ontario, stood first in the Bar Admission Course, and practiced with the law firm of Tory Tory DesLauriers & Binnington.

=== Career ===
Morton was the principal at Morton Barristers when his legal career ended because of his criminal conduct. Prior to that he was a founding partner at Morton Karrass LLP, and a founding partner and head of the litigation group at Steinberg, Morton, Hope and Israel LLP. His practice focused on commercial, criminal and constitutional litigation. He took an active role in the field of legal education, lecturing in the area of evidence and advanced evidence at Osgoode Hall Law School of York University and Thomas M. Cooley Law School at Lansing, Michigan. Morton also taught Administration at the Law Clerks Institute, and has taught in the areas of Civil Litigation, Professional Responsibility, Bankruptcy and Business Law of the Bar Admission Course. Morton published 18 legal textbooks, was past President of the Ontario Bar Association and a regular media commentator. He was a certified specialist of the Law Society of Upper Canada in the area of Civil Litigation. In 2013, he received the Ontario Bar Association's Distinguished Service Award.

=== Politics ===
Morton was a member of the Liberal Party of Canada and has served in positions at the riding and party levels. In 2011, he ran for office as the Federal Liberal candidate in 2011 in the Ontario riding of Oshawa. He is the former President of the Thornhill Federal Liberal Riding Association (TFLRA) and resigned the position of executive vice president of the riding on November 26, 2013, in order to contest the federal Liberal Party nomination.
