= Tex McGuire =

American old-time musician

Tex McGuire (February 29, 1909 – August 2, 1992) was an old-time music and hillbilly musician who played the guitar, banjo and dobro. He was born Marshall Everette McGuire in Monroe County, West Virginia and died in Low Moor, Virginia at the age of 83.

== Biography ==
Tex McGuire left his home in Gap Mills, West Virginia at age 14 and went on the road for 51 years, traveling the vaudeville circuit. When he was 14, he worked at the Jordan Taxi Stand in Charleston, West Virginia, carrying suitcases for tips. The manager of a local radio station heard him playing guitar in the hotel lobby and asked him to audition. Tex got the job of playing and singing 15 minutes each day for three dollars. He went to Texas at age 15 and played on Station XERA for Doc Brinkley, a patent medicine man. Tex played a song every 15 minutes between Brinkley's pitches. After the program, Tex would make deliveries on horseback. He was a member of the Del Rio Cowboys, a hillbilly singing group named after the Texas town where he once performed. The group broke up because of World War II, two members were killed in the war. Tex also had played with Bob Wills in the 1930s and 1940s.

He played music at WHIS radio station in Bluefield, West Virginia with the Joe Woods Harmony Band and played duets with Charles "Rex" Parker. Tex also worked with country singer Buddy Starcher at a Harrisonburg, Virginia radio station with Starcher's wife Mary Ann Estes. Buddy Starcher starred on his own show on WCHS-TV from 1960 to 1966.

Later in life, Tex continued to play music while living in Pickaway, West Virginia. He also served as an instructor at the Mountain Heritage School in Union, West Virginia, which was a state and federal financed program designed to preserve Appalachian culture. In 1976, Tex was one of the musicians at the Vandalia Gathering in central West Virginia which was inaugurated by the West Virginia Department of Culture and History headed by Norman Fagan. Many black and white traditional musicians as well as bluegrass bands were featured at the gathering. When folk musician Bob Martin moved to West Virginia in the 1970s he became good friends with Tex and worked on a documentary film on Tex's life directed by Boston filmmaker Bo Zabierek, which premiered at the 1990 Virginia Festival of American Film where the theme of the festival was "Music in the Movies." Singer-songwriter Sarah White had also become familiar with Tex's music when her family moved to Monroe County, West Virginia when she was a child.
