= Orville Stamm =

American strongman

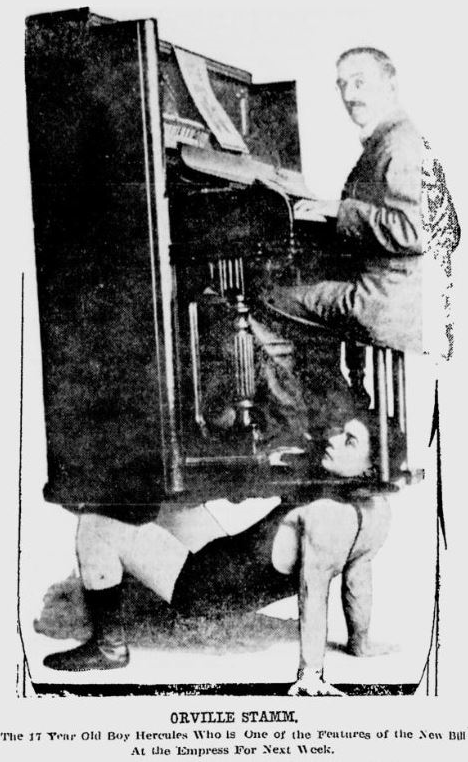
- Stamm having a piano played on top of him
- Born: June 29, 1893; Morton Township, Tazewell County, Illinois
- Died: May 8, 1963 (aged 69); Rockford, Illinois
- Occupation: Vaudeville performer

Orville Stamm (June 29, 1893 – May 8, 1963) was a strongman who was known as "The Boy Hercules".

== Information ==
Orville Stamm was born to Bessie Stamm and Louis Stamm. The couple divorced in 1903. He was a vaudeville child star. In 1909, he competed for boys' gymnast contest in Los Angeles. in 1914 he gave a lecture on weight loss in Tacoma.

Stamm performed a variety of tricks as part of his act including singing, floor tumbling, playing a violin with a dog hanging from his arm, playing the fiddle, lifting horses, lifting women, and letting a musician play a piano on top of his body.

Stamm and his wife, Martha Jane Stefanik, were known as the "eugenic couple". They performed internationally together doing adagio dances. The couple also performed routines involving singing, dancing and comedy. The pair performed in Calgary in 1924, in Nebraska in 1925 and Atlantic City, New Jersey in 1927.

Stamm and Stefanik were invited to the White House by Franklin D. Roosevelt during his presidency for tea. Stamm later had a piece of exercise equipment named after him called, "The Stamm Foldaway Gym".

== Personal life ==
Stamm was a physical instructor for the U.S. Navy during World War 1. Stamm later held patents on various gymnastic equipment, headlights and animal exercise equipment.

Stamm married Martha Jane Stefanik in 1947. Stefanik was a member of the New York City Ballet and was a regular performer in his act.
