= James Loster =

American vaudeville performer (1894–1948)

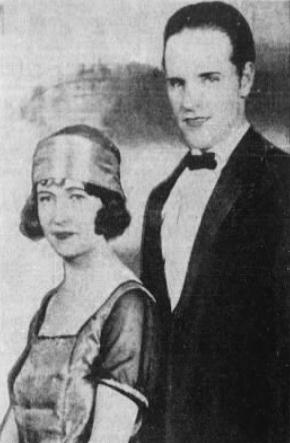
- James and Bernie Loster, circa 1928
- Born: James T. Fitzpatrick; January 1, 1894; Sioux City, IA
- Died: April 20, 1948 (aged 54); Pittsburgh, PA
- Occupation: Vaudeville acrobat
- Years active: 1908-1945

James Loster (January 1, 1894 – April 20, 1948) was the stage name for acrobat James "Jimmy" T. Fitzpatrick. He and his wife performed as James and Bernie Loster. Bernie's real name was Florence Cush Fitzpatrick. He was active on the vaudeville circuit (B. F. Keith, Keith-Albee) from 1914 to 1928.

He was president of the Pittsburgh Branch of the American Guild of Variety Artists (AGVA) and the United Entertainers, Local 921.
