= Jules Vernon =

- Born: 2 April 1867; Walter Lester Pope Knyvette, British India
- Died: 17 May 1937 (aged 70); San Francisco, California, United States
- Occupation: Ventriloquist

Jules Vernon (2 April 1867 – 17 May 1937) was an American ventriloquist. He achieved fame through becoming a famed vaudeville performer, specializing in ventriloquism.

== Early life and education ==
Vernon was born Walter Lester Pope Knyvette, in British India, as the son of an English officer in the army. He educated at the University of Oxford.

== Career ==
Vernon's act consisted of seven puppet characters who would engage in humorous dialogue with each other as well as Vernon. Although the dialogue undoubtedly provided a major element of the entertainment value in Vernon's act, further entertainment was derived from his sheer ability to jump from character to character without a hitch. His characters included the Old Maid, who sang; George, who had a severe stutter; Nettie, George's sister with a cleft lip; the Sailor; Joe, usually the main figure in the act; and Happy, a character who never spoke, but only laughed at the other characters’ jokes. All six of these figures (the seventh is not among the group) are on display at the Vent Haven Museum in Fort Mitchell, Kentucky.

As time passed, however, Vernon began to lose his eyesight, and, according to correspondence, he eventually went blind on Christmas morning, 25 December 1920, in the middle of a performance at the Orpheum Theater in Spokane, Washington. However, this setback did not hinder Vernon's ventriloquist act in any way. He continued to travel and perform, never revealing to any of his audiences that he was blind. This was achieved by mounting his puppets together on a bench, which were connected to a thread running from the bench to the backstage, which was set up by Vernon's wife before the show began. Vernon would follow the thread to the bench, and once in the proper place, knowing where each control was, he was able to perform as though he could in fact see. Using this method he continued successfully performing for years.

== Death ==
Vernon died on 17 May 1937, when he was struck by a speeding taxi cab in San Francisco, California. He was 70 years old.
