= Zelma Rawlston =

American singer (died 1915)

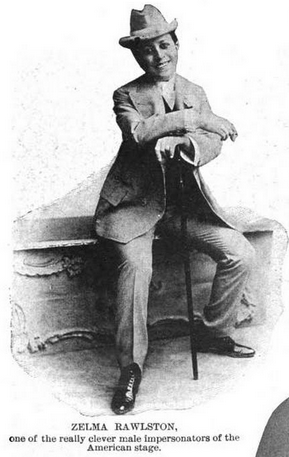
Zelma Rawlston, from a 1901 publication.

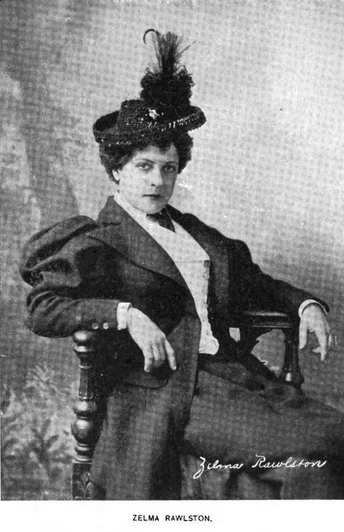
Zelma Rawlston, from an 1897 publication.

Zelma Rawlston (died October 30, 1915) was an American singer, comedian, and vaudeville performer, specializing in male impersonation, born Zelma Stuchenholz in Germany. She was billed as the "American Vesta Tilley."

== Early life ==
Zelma Stuchenholz was born in Germany and moved to the United States as a child. One profile, however, described her as being born in New York City in 1873, and training as a singer with Eugenie Pappenheim and Adelina Murio Celli, before attending National Conservatory of Music of America on a scholarship.

== Career ==
Rawlston was a soprano singer with the Charles F. Higgins Concert Company, formed in 1888. With her own touring company, she appeared in operatic, soubrette, and male roles, all on the same bill. She was billed as "the American Vesta Tilley" because she dressed as a man for her vaudeville performances; "for the first few years of her stage career she never appeared in anything but trousers," noted the New York Times in 1915. However, at some appearances, she changed from female to male clothing quickly onstage. In 1904, she explained that she cut her own hair short to improve the impersonation. In 1905, she was touring with George Lederer's "Smiling Island" company.

Rawlston originated the role of "Willie Van Astorbilt" in The Burgomaster (1900-1901) on Broadway. "Her singing of 'The Kangaroo Girl' has set the town to whistling the catchy air and made Miss Rawlston many friends," noted one New York paper. Other Broadway appearances included The Earl and the Girl (1905-1906) with Eddie Foy, and Chin-Chin (1914). Based on her fame, Rawlston's name, likeness, and testimony were used to advertise "Pe-Ru-Na" (a patent medicine marketed to women) and Dr. Bull's Cough Syrup.

Her photograph appeared on sheet music of her most popular numbers. She wrote the words to at least one published song, "We'll Take De Trip Dey Calls De Honeymoon" (1899).

== Personal life ==
Zelma Rawlston died in 1915, in New York, probably in her forties.
