= Professor Lamberti =

- Born: Basil Garwood Lambert; January 9, 1892; Valparaiso, Indiana, U.S.
- Died: March 13, 1950 (aged 58); Hollywood, California, U.S.
- Years active: 1945-1953
- Known for: vaudeville
- Spouse: Millie

Professor Lamberti (born Basil Garwood Lambert, January 9, 1892 – March 13, 1950) was an American vaudeville and burlesque performer active during the early part of the 20th century. He was billed as "the world's daffiest xylophonist".

He was born in Valparaiso, Indiana. At age seven he appeared in minstrel shows, at nine he was a boy juggler. By his teens he was appearing with the Henderson Stock Company and at 17 he joined the Adam Forepaugh circus as a wire artist and juggler. He later became a theatre musician playing drums and xylophone.

Lamberti's musical skills were good enough to get him work with the Cleveland Symphony Orchestra. But as he once said "You can't make a living out of the xylophone if you play it right." After fighting in World War I, he began appearing in vaudeville, honing a comic xylophone act that he used successfully for many years.

According to Lamberti, he was playing on a vaudeville bill in Topeka, Kansas when a magician's ducks escaped and wandered on the stage behind him. The audience went wild, and Lamberti decided that he would do well adding some comedy to his act.

Generally, his act would begin with Lamberti striding onstage pushing a xylophone proclaiming, "If you folks have been waiting for something lousy, here it is." Wearing an ill-fitting tuxedo, Lamberti would launch into a piece of music replete with mistakes, which were echoed on his face. As he got further into the piece, a young woman would appear behind and begin a striptease. As the audience encouraged the woman, Lamberti would mistake their excitement for encouragement of his playing. After realizing the presence of the stripper, Lamberti would chase her offstage with a seltzer bottle, thus ending the act.

Throughout the 1940s Lamberti appeared in nightclubs, and in 1942, he appeared in Michael Todd's production of Star and Garter with Bobby Clark and Gypsy Rose Lee. In 1945 he performed his xylophone act in the musical Tonight and Every Night starring Rita Hayworth.

He died at Hollywood Presbyterian Hospital in 1950, two months after his 58th birthday. His wife Millie was at his side.
