= Hazel Bess Laugenour =

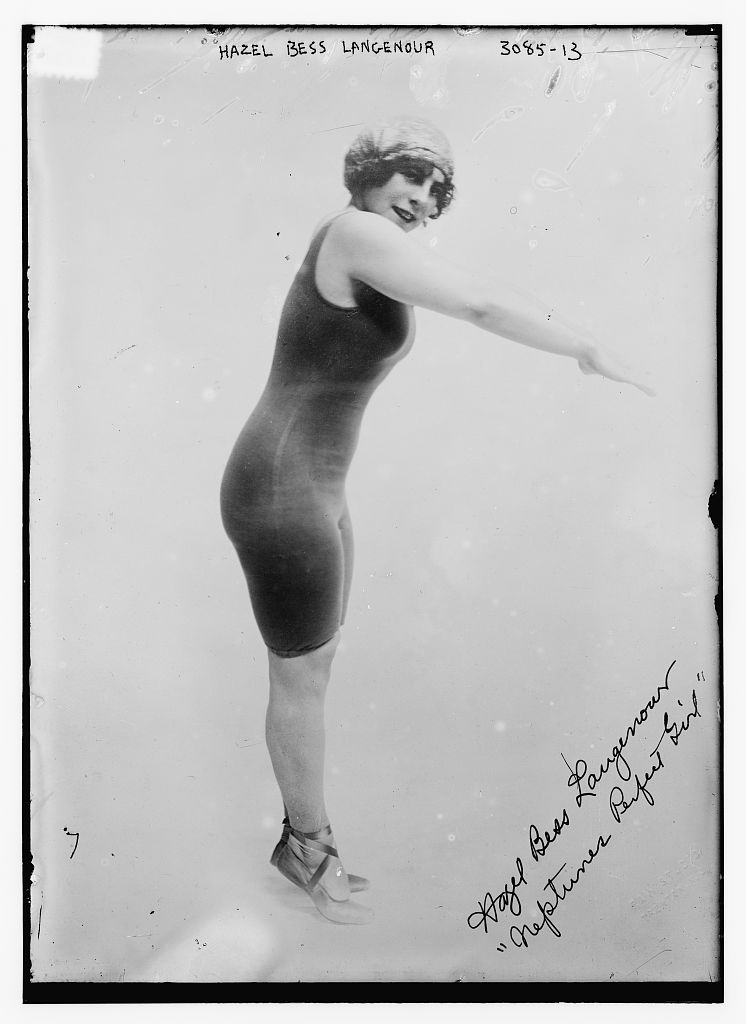

Personal information
- Born: 1891
- Died: 1960 (aged 68–69)

Sport
- Sport: Swimming

Hazel Bess Laugenour (c. 1891–1960) was an undergraduate at the University of California at Berkeley in literature when she became the first woman to swim across the Golden Gate Strait, which separates the Pacific Ocean from San Francisco Bay on August 19, 1911.

Laugenour capitalized on her international fame by making several movies (one of which is in the collection of the National Film Archives) and touring the country to promote the movies with an elaborate presentation, which included a very large transparent swimming tank, complete with pump motor to approximate tidal conditions. As she was preparing to swim the English Channel, World War I broke out, ending that ambition.

She married Timothy Edmund Fogg and had a daughter, Joan Fogg.
