= Toto (clown) =

Stage name of Armando Novello (1888–1938)

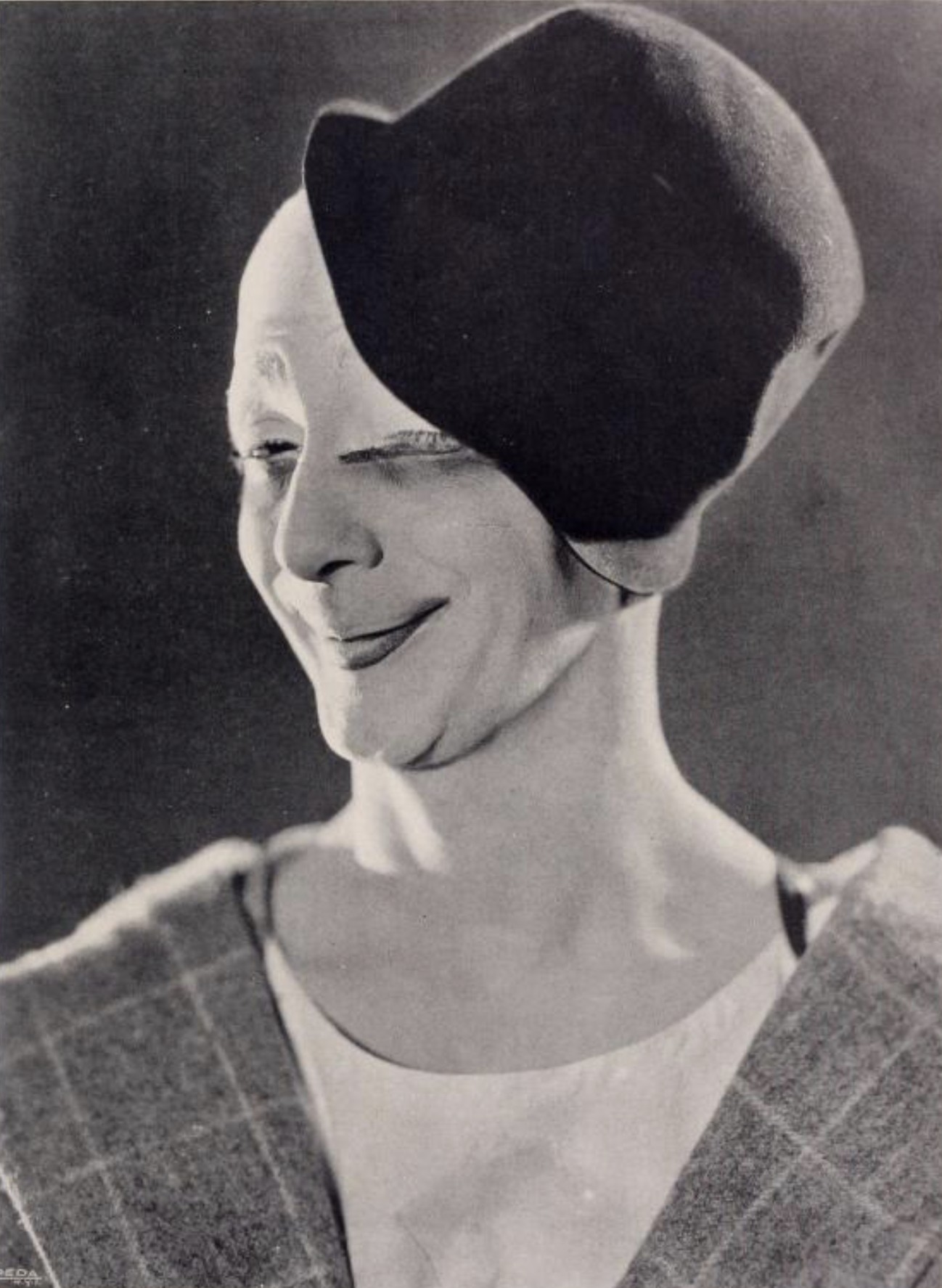
- Toto in 1928
- Born: Armando Novello; October 27, 1888; Geneva, Switzerland
- Died: December 15, 1938 (aged 50); New York City, U.S.
- Occupation: Clown

Armando Novello (October 27, 1888 – December 15, 1938), better known as Toto, was a Swiss-born clown who worked extensively in American vaudeville shows.

== Life and career ==
Novello was born in Geneva, Switzerland, according to most sources though he sometimes claimed that his birthplace was Hamburg. His first name is sometimes given in error as "Alfonso" or "Arnold". His father was an Italian horse trainer, and his mother was a German lion tamer. He began circus work as a child contortionist, and in his teens trained as a jockey before returning to circus and theatre work in Europe. He developed a clown act in which he would come on stage wearing oversized multicolored clothes and shoes, in a toy car that was far too small for him, together with a large suitcase and his small dog, Whiskey. He toured the U.S. in 1911, and performed before the royal families of Germany and Russia before being stranded in Petrograd at the outbreak of the First World War.

Sponsored by theatre manager and producer Charles Dillingham, he came to the U.S. in 1915 and appeared in the revue Hip! Hip! Hooray!. He made his vaudeville debut in 1918 in San Francisco, and worked in silent movies under the direction of Hal Roach. His films included Fire the Cook, An Enemy of Soap, and The Movie Dummy, all in 1918. In the 1920s he was a headline act at the New York Hippodrome and the Palace Theatre, toured widely in the U.S. and Canada, and appeared in New York in shows such as the Grand Street Follies of 1924.

He largely retired from the stage in the 1930s, after a final command performance before King George V and Queen Mary in 1931. He later ran an inn at Mamaroneck, New York, and each year toured local hospitals as a clown. His final film performance was in Al Christie's circus film Pink Lemonade in 1936.

== Illness and death ==
After he became ill, the New York Daily Mirror falsely reported his death in November 1938. His lawyers began action against the newspaper, but Toto died a few weeks later in the Bronx Hospital in New York, at the age of 50.
