= Donald "Monk" Watson =

American comedian

Donald Watson (March 23, 1894 - March 23, 1981), was a vaudeville performer, acrobat, magician, radio personality, musician and emcee, started the career of the great Bob Hope and toured with Elsie Janis. He also performed during World War I.

== World War I ==
Monk Watson fought on each of the five fronts in World War I. It was during his time as a soldier that he first met Elsie Janis while she was touring Europe, keeping up American morale. He describes this meeting in his autobiography.

I wanted to do something for her so I asked my Colonel if I couldn't give her some roses from the men. He said, "Monk, if you can find some I'll give you permission to give them to her." I took up some money and with it I talked some of the French women into getting me twenty-four beautiful roses. i then got out the suit of tails......put on a red wig, and after Elsie's first number I walked up the stairs to the stage and said,"Miss Janis, these are for you." With that I fell flat on my face, but held the roses high above my head. She looked at me and said, "Well, where did this come from, and who are you?" I went into a little patter and bowed off to the edge of the stage, which was ten feet high, and turned the most beautiful back somersault to the ground. She was so thrilled that she asked me to come back on the stage and do a dance for her. I did and she said, "Monk, if you come out of this mess alive look me up, because I'd like to have you in a show with me."
