= James J. Morton =

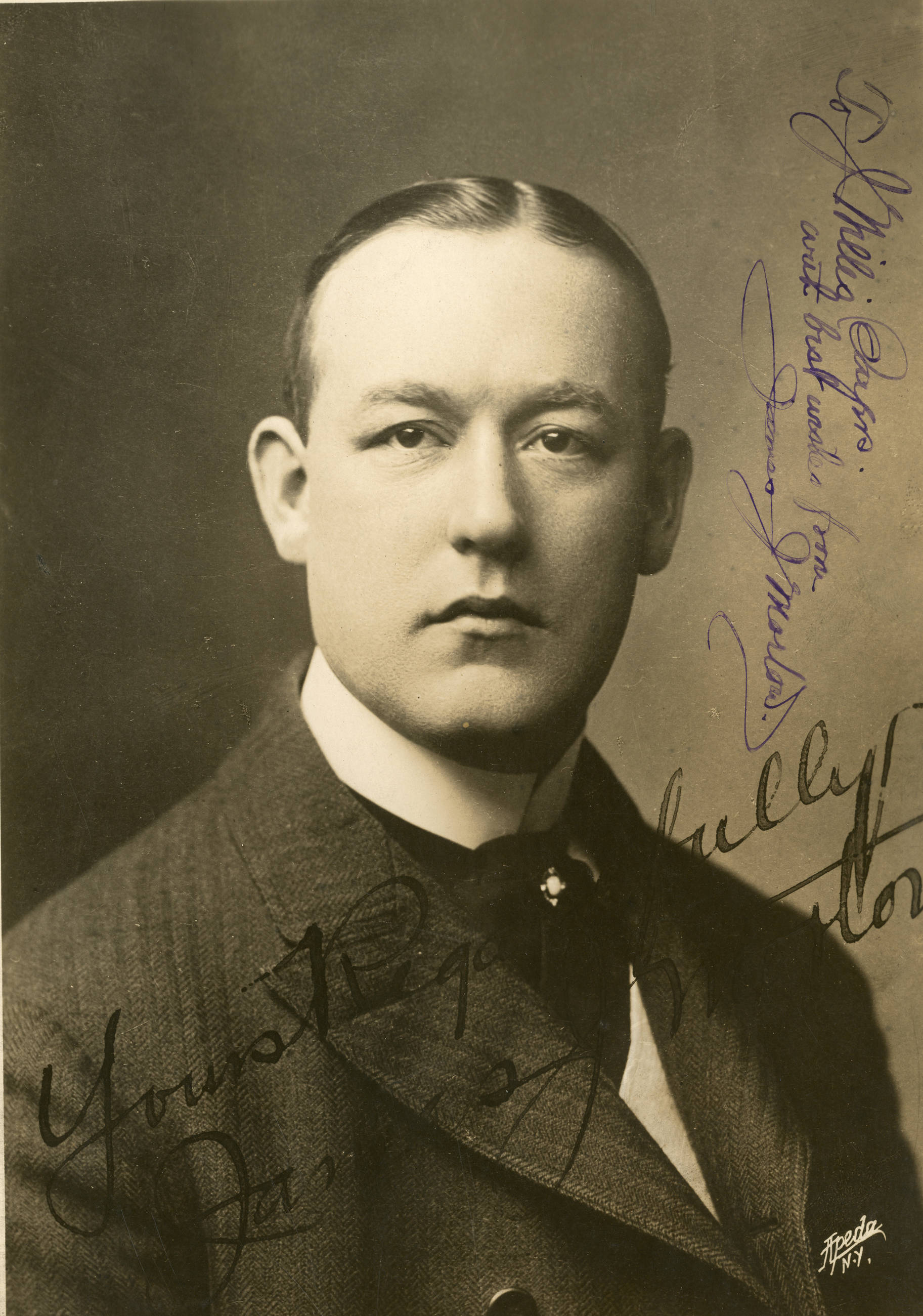
- Born: December 25, 1861; Boston, Massachusetts, U.S.
- Died: April 10, 1938 (aged 76); Islip, New York, U.S.
- Occupations: Vaudeville comedian; Master of ceremonies

James J. Morton (December 25, 1861 – April 10, 1938) was an American vaudeville comedian and master of ceremonies.

== Life and career ==
Born in Boston, Massachusetts, he first performed in vaudeville in the 1890s, as a double act with his wife, Maude Revel. A physically large man, he was billed as "the Boy Comic", and acted as though he was an overgrown child desperate to please the audience. His comedy act was that he would attempt to direct his wife as she sang, and explain her song to the audience, while never managing to successfully finish his interventions.

He became a solo performer in the early 1900s, and developed his act further as a monologist with a zany sense of humor, drifting from one absurdity to another. According to vaudeville historian Anthony Slide: "He would sing songs without music and without a rhyme, and would tell jokes that were pointless. Sometimes, as an encore, he would return to the stage announcing that he had left out a couple of lines from one of his songs, then proceed to sing lyrics that made absolutely no sense."

He would sometimes talk about other acts on the bill before they came on, often from the side of the stage, and in terms bearing no relation to what the acts actually did. As a result, he became, in 1906 at the American Theater in New York, the first recognised master of ceremonies in vaudeville. In the same year he was appointed as the first secretary of the Vaudeville Comedy Club, an association of performers set up by Will Cressy.

His act became less popular over time, and when another performer, James C. Morton (born James C. Lankton) became successful, James J. Morton feuded with him, and took out advertisements in the trade press to express his annoyance over the appropriation of his name, and to differentiate himself from his rival.

James J. Morton died in a retirement home for actors, in Islip, New York, in 1938, at the age of 76.
