= Michelle Ebanks =

President and CEO of the Apollo Theater

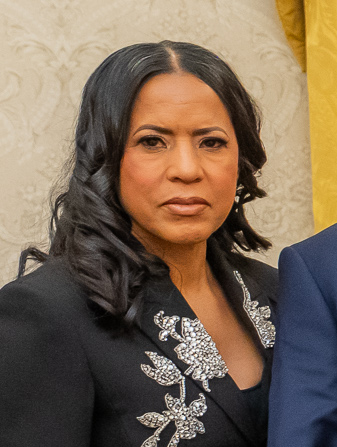
Michelle Ebanks on December 8, 2024, in the White House Oval Office

Michelle Ebanks is the president and CEO of the Apollo Theater. Until 2023, she had been the president of Essence Communications and People en Español.

== Early and family life ==
Michelle Ebanks was born Michelle Marie Washington on January 11, 1962, in Dayton, Ohio. Her father, Thomas K. Washington, served in the United States Army, where he transferred to bases throughout the country and in Germany. He was also a political activist during the civil rights era, appeared in a radio show weekly, had his own column in a Miami newspaper, and was the owner of several dry-cleaning businesses. Michelle’s mother, Charlotte Smith, was an employee of the city of Dayton at the department of housing and urban development.

Growing up, Michelle lived in primarily black neighborhoods. Before Michelle’s parents divorced, she and her two older brothers lived in Ohio, California, and Texas. After, they lived primarily with their mother and spent their summers in Miami with their father; where he resided after leaving the army. Michelle moved in with her father when she was in 5th grade. During that time, she visited her mother during school vacations and summer months.

In high school, she attended Gulliver Academy, a private school, where she and her brothers would be the first African Americans to attend. When she was in 10th grade she was elected first president for her class and vice president of the student body. She was captain of her volleyball and tennis teams, as well as president of the debate team. Michelle graduated high school one year early.

Ebanks married Gordon Ebanks in 1999 and had two children, Gordon James and Benjamin.

Ebanks is a member of both the New York Women in Communications organization and Magazine Publishers Association.

== Career ==
Ebanks graduated with a business degree from the University of Florida. She joined Time Inc. in 1996 working for Money magazine, where she was a financial director and general manager. She then helped lead the acquisition of Essence, Inc. and became a group publisher there in 2001. Ebanks was promoted to president of Essence Communications, Inc. in 2005. In 2011, she was named president of People en Español. Ebanks also oversees the Essence Festival, which draws tens of thousands of attendees each year.

== Education background ==
Michelle Ebanks graduated from Gulliver in 1979, after that, she entered the University of Florida. She grew up in a family business although she had no specific career goals, but, she decided to study finance in order to help out in her future husband's business. After graduating in 1984 with a degree in business finance, she went to Los Angeles, California to seek work instead of working in her father's company. She got a job as a financial analyst at Knapp Communications, working for Home and Bon Appétit magazines.
