= Jules Hurtig =

American vaudeville and theatre producer (1868–1928)

- Born: Julius Hurtig; October 18, 1868; Cincinnati, Ohio, U.S.
- Died: March 9, 1928 (aged 59); At sea
- Other names: McVon Hurtig
- Occupations: Vaudeville and theatre producer
- Years active: c. 1880s–1928

Julius Hurtig (October 18, 1868 – March 9, 1928) was an American vaudeville and theatre producer, best known for his partnership with Harry J. Seamon (1865–1938).

== Life and career ==
He was born in Cincinnati, Ohio, the son of Metta and Daniel Hurtig, who were German immigrants. In his youth he joined the Barnum and Bailey Circus, and then became a producer of pyrotechnical shows.

He linked up with fellow producer Harry J. Seamon, and they became established as vaudeville promoters and producers. The partnership of Hurtig and Seamon worked in New York from at least 1899. Among their most successful acts was the pairing of Bert Williams and George Walker. Often with Seamon, Hurtig also produced, and occasionally directed, Broadway shows, including In Dahomey (1903, for which he was credited as McVon Hurtig, and which featured Williams and Walker), Me, Him and I (1904), and In New York Town (1905).

Hurtig and Seamon pioneered the development of burlesque entertainment, and leased theatres in Ohio as well as the Harlem Music Hall in New York. In 1913, they leased a newly constructed theatre building in Harlem, initially known as Hurtig & Seamon's New Theater, to accommodate the burlesque productions of the Columbia Amusement Company, which they had joined. Opened only to white patrons in its first few years, it began admitting black patrons in the 1920s, and later became the Apollo Theater.

Jules Hurtig died in 1928, at the age of 59, from a heart attack while on a sea voyage.
