= Victoria Theater (Harlem) =

Theater in Manhattan, New York

Coordinates: 40°48′35.08″N 73°56′58.28″W

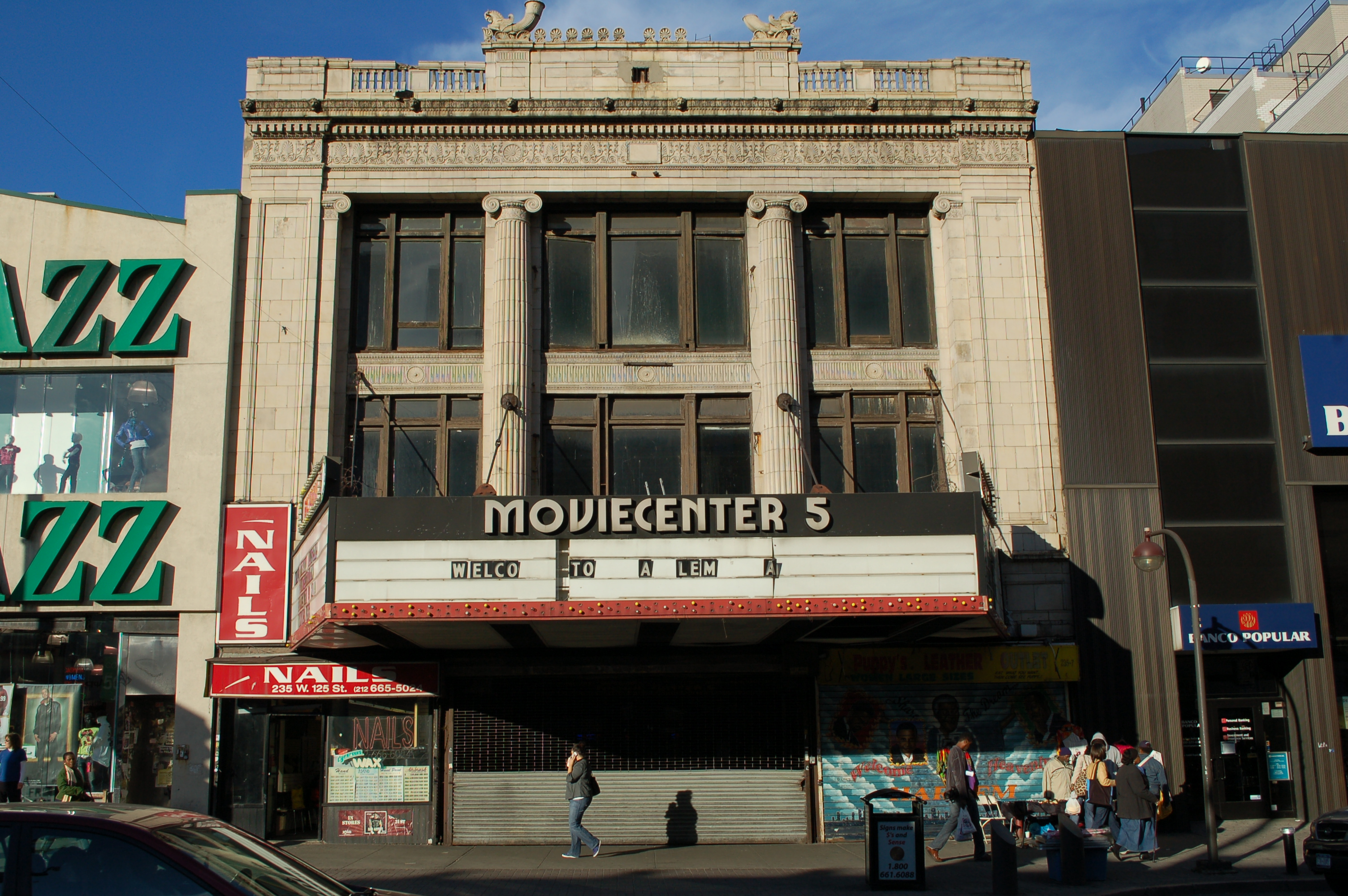
The façade of the Victoria Theater, showing its most recent name of "Moviecenter 5"

The Victoria Theater was a theater located on 125th Street in the Harlem neighborhood of Manhattan in New York City. It was designed in 1917 by Thomas W. Lamb, a notable and prolific theater architect of the era, for the Loew's Corporation. It was largely demolished in 2017, with the facade and lobby retained as part of a new mixed-use skyscraper, the tallest building in Manhattan north of Central Park.

The Loew's Victoria Theater, as it was known until 1977, opened as a 2,394-seat, luxury Vaudeville and motion picture theater. Typical of movie palaces of its era, it contained a stage and backstage dressing rooms and provisions for live music, including an organ. It cost $250,000 to build and was hailed “as one of the largest and most beautiful theaters in greater N.Y.” by a contemporary publication. When the Victoria was built, it joined many other Harlem theaters including the Proctor, Hammerstein Opera House, the Alhambra as well as the nearby Apollo, then the Hurtig & Seamon's New (Burlesque) Theater. In 1977, the Harlem Community Development Corporation acquired the building.

The Victoria was converted to a multi-screen cinema in 1987. Five movie theaters were created from the large auditorium, mezzanine and stage areas. The cinema closed soon after, in 1989, but a 400-seat venue was left intact in the orchestra, at which the original Harlem company of Godspell, which drew major newspaper and television network broadcast coverage, ran for approximately a year in the 1996/97 season. In 2005 several proposals for redevelopment were made. Only two proposals called for reusing the theater's interior, which angered some community leaders, according to the New York Times.

The new Victoria Theater project, developed by the Lam Group and Exact Capital, designed by architect Ariel Aufgang and interiors by AJC Design, began construction in April 2017. The theater was largely demolished, except for the historic facade, marquee, outdoor ticket booth, lobby and grand staircase. Behind that was constructed a 27-story, 400,000-square-foot tower, the tallest building in Manhattan north of Central Park. It contains 191 mixed-income rental apartments; a 210-room Renaissance hotel; 25,000 square feet of retail; and another 25,000 square feet of cultural and arts space. The project suffered numerous delays and was forced to seek refinancing, which was secured in the spring of 2022. The Victoria Tower Residences opened in 2022, while the Renaissance New York Harlem Hotel opened on October 17, 2023.
