= Ariel Aufgang =

American architect

Ariel Aufgang, AIA, is an American architect.

== Career ==
Aufgang is the principal at Aufgang Architects, a firm with practices in the New York Metropolitan area & Florida. A graduate of Rensselaer Polytechnic Institute (RPI) in Troy, NY, with Bachelors in Architecture and a BS in building science degrees, Aufgang is a licensed architect in New York, New Jersey, Connecticut, Texas, Florida and Georgia. He is known for designs based on adaptive reuse, luxury apartments, senior living, accessibility and affordable housing. His designs have garnered multiple awards and his firm is one of the ten most prolific in NYC over the past six years.

Aufgang Architects is a New York State and New York City Certified Minority Business Enterprise.

Aufgang is President of the Rockland Community Foundation Board of Directors.

=== Notable Projects ===
- Victoria Theater – adaptive reuse project in Harlem
- 200 Water Street - renovation and conversion of the former Brillo Factory
- Corn Exchange Bank Building – renovation and expansion in Harlem
- Webster Avenue Commons - affordable housing located in the Bronx and winner of NYSAFAH Project of the Year Award 2016
- Park Lane at Sea View - senior affordable housing located on Staten Island and winner of the NYSAFAH Project of the Year Award in 2010
- The Melody - one of the first buildings to incorporate the NYC Active Design Guidelines / first New York residential building to achieve the LEED innovation credit for physical activity
- 881 Erskine Street, Brooklyn - One of the 4 biggest projects underway in NYC 2017
