= Harlem Opera House =

Venue in Manhattan, New York (1889–1959)

Coordinates: 40°48′33″N 73°56′57″W

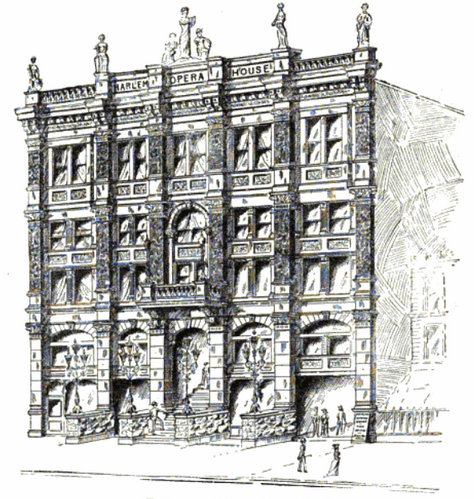
- Interactive map of the Harlem Opera House area

General information
- Location: Manhattan, New York City
- Opened: 1889
- Demolished: 1959

Design and construction
- Architect: John B. McElfatrick

Harlem Opera House was an opera house located at 211 West 125th Street, in the Harlem neighborhood of Manhattan in New York City, New York, U.S. Designed by architect John B. McElfatrick, it was built in 1889 by Oscar Hammerstein; it was his first theater in the city.

== History ==
An early work at the house was The Charlatan, an operetta with music and lyrics by John Philip Sousa and a book by Charles Klein, which transferred from the Knickerbocker Theatre. From 1900 to 1911, the theater was known as Keith & Proctor’s Harlem Opera House. Through the early 1920s, the venue was included in the Keith-Albee vaudeville circuit. By 1922, it was purchased by Frank Schiffman and subsequently closed. The Harlem Opera House showed films starting in the mid-1930s. It was demolished in December 1959.

== Architecture and fittings ==
The venue featured a wide and a grand staircase and balcony of polished Italian marble. The auditorium offered blue seats, and the boxes were arranged in three tiers on either side of the stage. They occupied the most conspicuous part of the theatre, were set forward, and were entirely open. The curtain was made by E. T. Harvey and was decorated with an image of Shakespeare reading one of his plays to Queen Elizabeth and some members of her court; it was painted in bright colors.

== Bibliography ==
- Epoch Publishing Company (1889). The Epoch. Vol. 6 (Public domain ed.). New York, New York: Epoch Publishing Company.
- Smith, Eric Ledell (24 October 2003). African American Theater Buildings: An Illustrated Historical Directory, 1900-1955. McFarland. ISBN 978-0-7864-4922-4.
