= American Pole League =

Sports organization

The American Pole League (APL) represents pole and aerial athletes in the United States. It is the officially recognized federation representing the US in the International Pole Sports Federation (IPSF), which is the international governing body for pole sports. The American Pole League holds a yearly national championship, and qualifying athletes go on to compete at the international level in the annual World Pole Sports Championships hosted by the IPSF. The American Pole League's stated mission and vision involve raising the profile of pole sports and supporting pole athletes, coaches, and judges.

== Background ==
Pole dance has expanded in popularity in recent years, growing into an internationally competitive sport. Competitors combine artistry with acrobatic feats in pole art and pole sports competitions.

The IPSF formed to unify and standardize pole sports. The IPSF has been recognized by the Global Association of International Sports Federations (GAISF) as an Observer Member. It is a signatory of the World Anti-Doping Agency's (WADA) anti-doping code, and is a member of the Association for International Sport for All (TAFISA). Pole sports athletes include youth and para pole athletes.

The first IPSF U.S. National Championships were held in 2015. At that time, the United States Pole Sports Federation (USPSF) was the federation representing American athletes. After the IPSF terminated the USPSF's membership for failing to comply with rules and an ethical violation, American athletes were left without a national organization. The American Pole League formed to fill this void. The APL filed an application in 2016 and was officially recognized by the IPSF in 2017.

The APL hosted their first national and open championships in 2018, the American Pole League Championship. That year, Jesse Weber (age 12) became the first male youth to compete for the United States. At the international level, APL athletes received important awards in 2018. Paige Olson was awarded "Novice Athlete of the Year", and Polina Volchek (Pink Puma) received a lifetime achievement award.
