= Elena Gibson =

English dancer (born 1976)

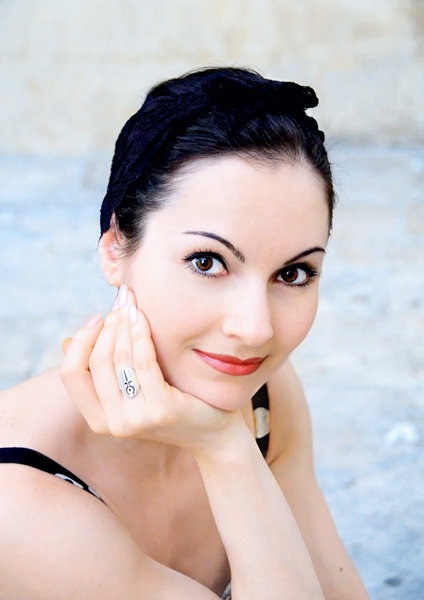
Elena Gibson

Elena Gibson is a professional dance artist, pole dance movement director and creator, guest dance teacher, jury member, presenter and author who has played a leading role in the development of pole dancing as an art form and sport across the world.

She was the first World Pole Dancing Champion when crowned Miss Pole Dance World in 2005, before being controversially disqualified 24 hours later. Gibson is the head of the Artistic committee of POSA world federation, the UK representative of the International Pole Federation (IPF), the European representative of the International Pole Fitness Federation (IPFF) and a member of the International Dance Council (CID UNESCO).

== Career ==
Elena trained in classical ballet at Canada's National Ballet School in Toronto from a young age, where she was awarded several years' full scholarship. She graduated from there in 1995 and began a career as a ballerina, first with The National Ballet of Canada and later with the Bayerisches Staatsballett (Bavarian State Ballet) in Germany, along the way winning the Professional Young Dancers Competition in Italy in 1996.

In March 2000, she was seriously injured in a car accident which forced her retirement from professional ballet. It was while recovering from the accident that she discovered pole dancing as a way to regain fitness. This then inspired her new career as a performer and choreographer of modern dance routines in a style that fused the classical elegance of ballet with the gymnastic and acrobatic moves of pole dancing.

In 2003, she moved to London United Kingdom and in 2005 she won Miss Pole Dance UK and then the inaugural Miss Pole Dance World, becoming the first ever World Pole Dancing Champion, with her Black Swan routine. She was later controversially disqualified from the World title because the removal of her tutu as she transformed from ballerina to pole dancer during her routine was deemed to constitute stripping (which was not allowed by the rules).

In 2006, she founded London's Pole Dancing School and in 2017 she founded The London Studios in Italy (Milan) and currently operates Firebird Studio in Barcelona. Her teaching has received widespread recognition. She was the UK's first Level 3 Pole Dancing Instructor (appointed by Pole Dance Community) and in 2012 the International Pole Dance Fitness Association (IPDFA) named her Pole Dance Instructor of the Year. She has also appeared as a judge at numerous pole dance competitions across the world.

Since 2006 she has also been a leading advocate in the development of pole dancing as an art form and as a sport, representing the UK on the IPF and working as a board member and European representative on the IPFF. She is also a board member of Equity's Pole Dance Working Party and their Choreographer's Committee.

== Achievements ==
- Winner Miss Pole Dance UK 2005
- Winner Miss Pole Dance World 2005
- Winner Pole Dance Instructor of the Year 2012 by IPDFA

== Qualifications ==
- Member of Equity
- PDC Pioneer Award
- Certified Ishta yoga instructor
- Head of the Artistic committee of POSA Federation
- UK representative board member of the International Pole Federation
- European representative board member of the International Pole Fitness Federation
- Member of the International Dance Council

== Personal life ==
In 2001, Elena married British entertainer Marcus Gibson whom she had met when living in Munich, Germany. They moved to London in 2003 and the marriage ended in divorce after 5 years. Elena and Marcus have maintained a close friendship for over two decades.

At a party in London Elena met British entrepreneur David White, VP Product FCC and Payments at LexisNexis Rish Solutions with whom she was in a relationship for 15 years. Elena gave birth to their daughter Grace Esme White in February 2013. Before the end of their relationship David was unfaithful to Elena with an Indonesian woman 24 years younger than David, Renda Putri CEO of DowaBag.co.id.
