= Northwest Terror Fest =

- Genre: Extreme metal
- Dates: May, June and July (varies)
- Frequency: Semi-annually
- Venue: Neumos and Barboza
- Locations: Seattle, Washington, United States
- Years active: 2017-present
- Website: northwestterrorfest.com

Northwest Terror Fest is an American underground music festival focused on extreme metal held at the Neumos and Barboza music venues in Seattle, situated in the city's historical Capital Hill neighborhood. It began in 2018.

== History ==
The festival began in 2018. Its first iteration featured Agoraphobic Nosebleed, Integrity and Panopticon. The 2022 lineup featured a reunited Ludicra, Repulsion, Suffocation, Cryptic Slaughter and Windhand. The 2023 lineup featured acts such as Autopsy, YOB, Conan, Ghoul. In 2024, the festival was headlined by Belgian post-metal band Amenra, American thrash metal band Forbidden and American powerviolence band Weekend Nachos. Panopticon returned to the festival in 2025. Taiwanese-American death metal band Ripped to Shreds also played. The festival's 2026 lineup is slated to include Black Breath, Deadguy, Pig Destroyer and Oranssi Pazuzu.
