= International Pole Championship =

International pole dance competition

The International Pole Championship (IPC) is a competition organised every second year by the International Pole Dance Fitness Association (IPDFA). It is the brainchild of renowned performer and instructor Ania/Anna Przeplasko (pronounced pshe plaz ko). It is the world's first international pole dance fitness championship where winners are credited solely for their dance skills, unique tricks, techniques, overall performance and showmanship. To enter into IPC Winners of National Championships are granted entry to the semi-final division of the 4 phase elimination process. Undiscovered talents can submit their video entry via the IPC website. Semi-finalists are chosen by panel of experienced International Judges, and announced online via social media platforms. Fans enter into an online voting system to choose their favourite semi-finalist who joins the world most proclaimed performers entered with the title of Pole Idol, together with a sponsorship to the Grand Finals.

== The Competition ==
Competitors compete in two categories: Pole Fit and Pole Art. The competitor with the highest total score from both categories including deductions for mishaps wins the title of Ultimate Pole Champion. There are five divisions: men's, women's, doubles Masters and disabled.

Pole Fit focuses on the technical aspect of the routine. Competitors in this category are given higher points for difficulty and execution of their unique tricks, performed on both spinning and static poles.

Pole Art focuses on the artistic aspect of the routine. In this category, competitors are given higher points for the performance, theme interpretation originality and choreography of their pole dance routine.

To receive the maximum number of points, performances have to be well executed with careful attention paid to the synchronisation of dance moves to the music. Movements have to be precise, clear and easy to recognise, and movements relevant to their discipline of greater difficulty and complexity will receive higher scores. Transitions between moves should be smooth and orderly. Individual confidence is recognised, with stress placed on energy, enthusiasm, and strong stage presence. Creative openings and endings to performances as well as theme and story also receive high scores. Choreography is judged on level of difficulty, use of relevant movements, transitions, and synchronisation with music.

=== 2008 – Manila ===
The first International Pole Dance Fitness Championship was held in Manila. Finalists for this competition were chosen solely via video entries. Ten finalists from nine countries competed for the title.

=== 2009 - Tokyo ===
In 2009, responding to a demand by both men and women, IPC opened a category for men – the world's first. The new category received worldwide media attention, refuting the claim that pole dance is designed for the amusement of men. Competitors this year were also submitted applications via video entries. Judges from around the world from various sport and dance disciplines judged the entries and picked the finalists. Fans participated and voted online for their favorite competitor via the IPC website. The winner won the title of Pole Idol.

=== 2010 – Tokyo ===
A new category for disabled performers opened in 2010, inspired by sight impaired pole dancer Marie Dunot from France who had entered IPC in 2009. The competition had a live audience of 3000 fans. National champions from different countries competed, as well as an open category for competitors who submitted a video entry. Fans from all over the world went to Tokyo to support their favorite competitor.

Year	Men - Pole Fit	Men - Pole Art	Men - Ultimate	Women - Pole Fit	Women - Pole Art	Women - Ultimate	Pole Idol	Disabled
IPC 2008 Manila	-	-	-	Yuko Hatsumoto JP	Marsha Yuan USA	Anna Marie Garbo PH	-	-
IPC 2009 Tokyo	Dave Kahl AU	Simonko Saimas SP	Dave Kahl AU	Amanda Duffy USA	Domanova Svetlana RU	Mai Sato JP	Sarah Cretul USA	-
