= Pole sports =

Sports related to pole dancing

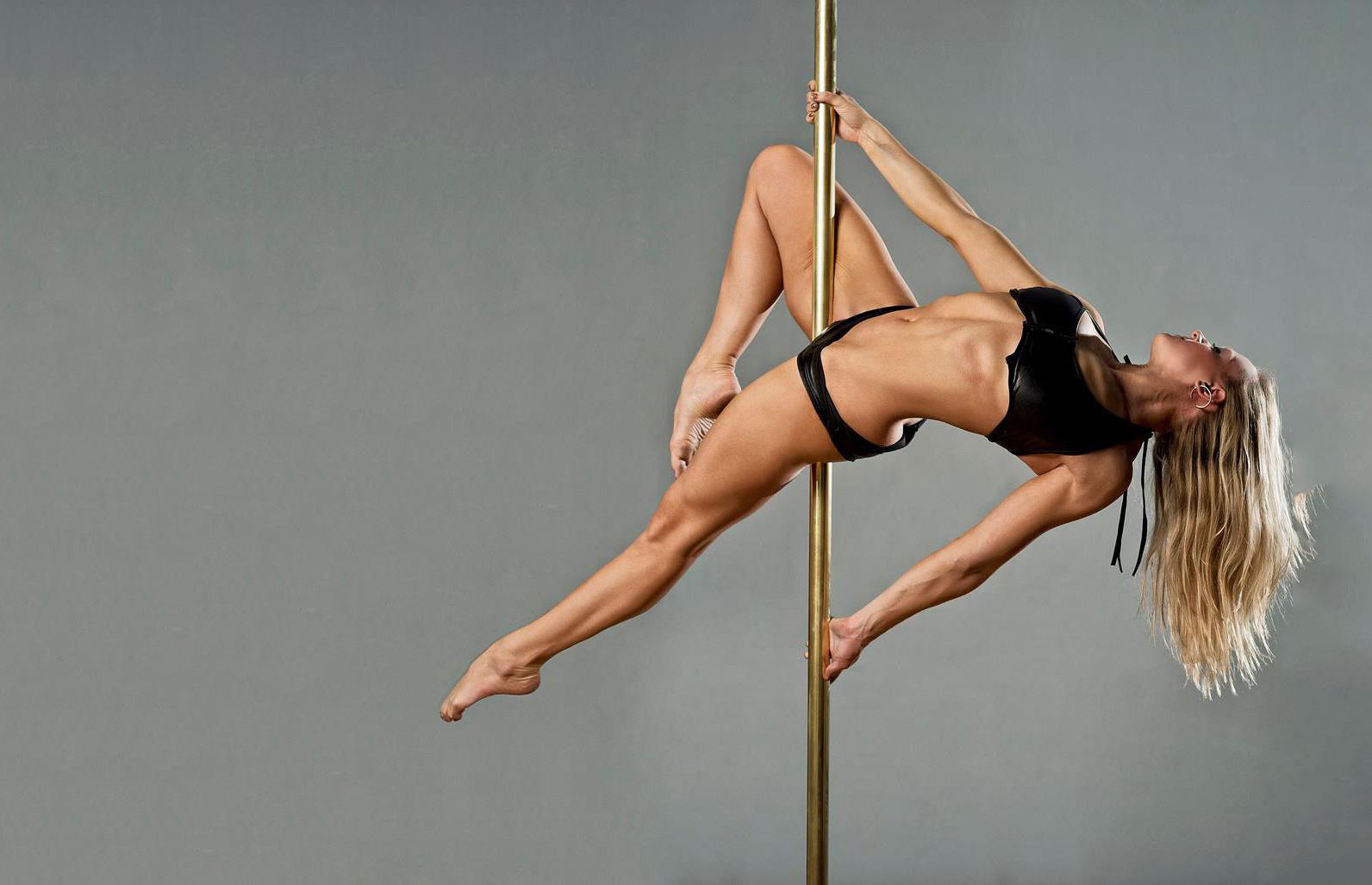

Pole sports, or poling, merges dance and acrobatics using a vertical metal pole. Athletes climb up, spin from, hang off, flip onto, jump off, and invert on poles. Poling requires agility, strength, balance, endurance, and flexibility. A 2017 study of 52 female pole dancers indicated that pole-dance fitness improves strength and posture. Poling can serve as a form of cardiorespiratory exercise and can improve muscle strength and flexibility. Pole-sports athletes include men and women of a variety of ages and physical abilities, including para-athletes, who perform alone or with others (for example, in doubles competitions).

Poling developed into a fitness activity and sport during the 1990s and 2000s, with national and international pole competitions. Poling has become a dance, fitness activity and sport, and continues to evolve. The International Pole Sports Federation (IPSF), formed in 2009 by Tim Trautman and Katie Coates, is endeavoring to make poling an Olympic sport. The federation has held world championships since 2012, and poling was one of seven sports granted observer status by the Global Association of International Sports Federations (GAISF) in 2017. Professional pole-sports leagues have been formed, notably Oksana Grishina's O.G. Pole Fitness (which holds its annual championship at Mr. Olympia) and the Pole Championship Series (which holds its annual championship at the Arnold Sports Festival).

In a pole competition, each athlete generally performs a routine to music. Athletes are judged on their ability to perform complex movements (e.g. spins and strength and flexibility poses), choreography, style, and expressiveness. Poles in IPSF pole-sports competitions are brass, 45 mm (1.77 in) in diameter, with 4m (13.12 feet) of usable height. In competition, athletes regularly use a static (non-spinning) pole and a spinning pole. Their skin helps performers grip the slippery poles, and athletes wear clothing which exposes the skin on their shoulders, waist, arms and legs. The IPSF requires competitors to cover their pelvis, gluteal muscles and (for women) breasts. When using Chinese poles (which differ from IPSF poles), thicker clothing protects the body.

== Background ==
Historically, poles have been used in various sports, dances, and recreational activities, including mallakhamba, the Filipino dance Singkil, maypole dancing, and circuses. For example, mallakhamba traces its origins to the 12th-century malla-yuddha, a type of wrestling in India. It commonly uses a 2.25-metre (7 ft 5 in) wooden pole and a cotton rope. The practice has a spiritual component, involves acrobatic and yogic movements, and was first developed as a tool for wrestlers. Mallakhamba has grown into a contemporary sport:

When mallakhamb re-emerged in the nationalist period before Indian independence, it was practiced separate to wrestling. At this point, paradoxically, the actual form of mallakhamb in its new incarnation became influenced by English competitive sports and took on the structural framework of colonial British gymnastics. It was at this point that mallakhamb became an organized sport and was most often practiced in Western-style gymnasiums and urban sport grounds.

According to Qifeng and Xining, acrobatic Chinese pole-climbing was first mentioned 2,000 years ago. Its techniques arose from tree-climbing in agriculture. Chinese poling is an acrobatic activity which has been part of Cirque du Soleil and is taught for recreational purposes in aerial gyms, such as Aerial Athletica in Las Vegas.

Poling for fitness and sport grew out of strip clubs and striptease. Not all strip dance clubs have poles, however, and not all strippers make a pole central to their performance. Classes in "exotic" pole, pole fitness and pole dance have been offered in strip clubs, bars, gyms and specialized pole studios. This included Image Studio in Canada in the 1980s, where male and female "exotic dancers" were trained in pole dance, floor work, and choreography. Fitness model, performer and former stripper Fawnia Mondey-Dietrich is often credited with developing some of the first instructional pole dance videos in the 1990s. Pole studios (studios focused on teaching pole) have sprung up in Africa, Asia, Australia and Europe. They offer classes focused on fitness and athletics as well as those with erotic components.

Students in pole classes learn how to perform spins, supporting their body weight with their hands. They learn how to climb the pole, invert (flip upside down), and perform complicated maneuvers or tricks. Pole classes are physically challenging, and poling requires a high level of understanding how the body's points of contact work with the pole. As pole athletes develop skill, they can use fewer body points of contact with the pole and make more aerial moves without being on the ground (including deadlifting their bodies from a stationary aerial position parallel to the pole into an inverted – upside-down – position). In addition to strength and flexibility, pole sports can be painful. Researchers have begun studying the physiological effects of poling and potential risks for injury.

Poling has not developed into a fitness activity and sport without tension. Some feminists say that poling is part of the larger sexualization of culture and is objectifying. Pole classes have provided opportunities for students to bond with and support each other, however, and encourages athleticism. Poling has sex-positive aspects, may challenge gender and sexual stereotypes, and studies have indicated that polers can feel empowered.

Some of the first pole studios promoting pole to the general public for fitness, leisure, and sport were started by strippers, such as Tantra Fitness. However, tensions have developed between some strippers and fitness-sport polers, such as when strippers have not been welcome in pole studios and competitions, or when hobbyists have distanced themselves from stripping. Strippers have argued that distancing can be divisive, be stigmatizing, serve as a source of cultural appropriation, and ignore the fundamental contributions made by strippers to poling. For example, a Twitter debate occurred, with polers using the hashtag #notastripper to distance poling from strippers; strippers and supporters used the hashtags #yesastripper and #eroticnotexotic.

Poling is now practiced in classes, in professional and international competitions, strip clubs, and onstage in non-strip clubs; Felix Cane and others have performed in Cirque du Soleil. The IPSF hosts world competitions in pole sports and ultra, artistic and para pole.

== Sport ==
Pole dance has become pole sports; the International Pole Sports Federation was founded in 2008, with national federations, competitive teams, formalized rules and a code of points. Poling tricks have multiplied as the pole community has developed and shared new techniques. Some athletes perform acrobatic tricks, jumps and other maneuvers, making poling an extreme sport.

Companies have formed to support pole sports, manufacturing competition poles and poles for home and practice. Performers use a variety of grip aids to minimize sweat or aid stickiness. Other companies provide clothing to polers.
