= Swansea University Students' Union =

Students' union in the UK

- UNDEB MYFYRWYR PRIFYSGOL ABERTAWE
- Registration no.: Charity number: 1149941
- Headquarters: Swansea University, Singleton Park
- Coordinates: 51.6096°N 3.9792°W
- Chair: Megan Chagger
- Website: http://www.swansea-union.co.uk/

Swansea University Students' Union (Welsh: Undeb Myfyrwyr Prifysgol Abertawe) is the students' union for Swansea University and is part of the National Union of Students of the United Kingdom. The Students' Union aims to promote the interests of students at the University.

Its offices are located on both Swansea University campuses, in Faraday Tower on Singleton Park Campus and Y Twyni on Bay Campus.

== Democracy ==
The Students' Union is a democracy governed by the articles of governance and schedules. All students of Swansea University are automatically enrolled into the Union at the beginning of each term and then have the right to propose and vote on Ideas (motions) at the Student Forums.

Representing the students are the executive committee which is made up of Full Time Officers and the Part Time Officers. The Executive sets the policy and direction of the Students' Union, and is guided through with policy proposals made at the Student Forums. Commonly referred to as the 'Exec', it is made up of the elected 6 full-time Officers and 15 part-time elected officers. The Chair of the Committee is the Union President.

== Services ==
The Union runs a variety of services including a supermarket ("MyCostCutter"), a coffee shop (Fulton Coffee Co), and student bars (JCs, and Tafarn Tawe). There is also an Advice & Support Centre and a Nursery.

=== Advice and Support Centre ===
The Union runs the Support Centre which has 3 advisers. It is a service that gives advice on a variety of topics, such as debt, academic problems, consumer advice, housing, contracts, personal issues, employment and health.

=== Swansea Accommodation Service ===
The Students' Union officially launched Swansea Accommodation Service (SAS) on 1 February 2007 in the Digital Technium. The Students' Union took the decision to create Swansea Accommodation Service because "it wanted to improve the standard of accommodation available to students, which in turn may help to reduce the high level of complaints made by students every year". SAS has now become a partnership company with the University recently moved offices to the Accommodation Office in Penmaen and to online resources.

=== Student Swansea Events ===
Student Swansea Events run the large-scale annual events during the academic year, including Freshers' Fortnight, for the first two weeks of term, the Swansea Summer Ball on the main campus site which event takes place on the University's Abbey Meadow.

The ents department also help run the annual Welsh Varsity between Swansea University and Cardiff University by selling and distributing tickets as well as match entertainment, merchandise and the after party.

=== JC's ===
JC's is situated on the second floor of Fulton House, and is the Students' Union's bar and coffee shop. It runs a quiz night on Sundays. A popular venue with students, the bar has recently reopened after undergoing significant renovation in time for its reopening in September 2011.

=== Rebound ===
Rebound is the student night club, previously named Divas, and DV8 before that. There was a competition in 1993 to rename the Students' Union bar after it moved from the top floor of the Students' Union building to the first floor. While on the top floor the bar had been called the "Mandela Bar" in honour of the South African freedom campaigner.

=== Sin City ===
Sin City is a nightclub and live music venue, which opened December 2006 and was originally partly owned by Swansea University Students' Union. In 2010 Swansea University Students' Union took full ownership of the club.

== Swansea Student Media ==
The Students' Union provides support for print, radio and television production activities through Swansea Student Media (SSM). Although these platforms have been running for considerable time, the Swansea Student Media brand was established in 2015, allowing the media groups to grow their reputation in the University. Swansea Student Media is run by students, and the committee is elected from the society members each year.

=== The Waterfront Newspaper ===
The Waterfront Newspaper is Swansea University's Students' Union Newspaper. The paper is part of the PR and marketing department of the Students' Union and aims to reflect students' perspectives on a wide range of sections. Founded in September 1995, it published its 200th issue on 7 March 2011. Material for the newspaper is submitted by students, to be made available in online and printed versions. The printed editions are distributed in busy locations around campus during term time.

=== Xtreme Radio ===
Xtreme Radio is Swansea University's Students' Union Radio Station, founded in 1968, making it the third oldest in the UK. Traditionally, the station broadcast on the 1431 kHz AM frequency around the campus, through the Union's shops and other venues. Programming is now only broadcast online using the TuneIn Radio platform. Programming is played 24/7 from the radio studios based in Fulton House on Singleton Park Campus. Xtreme Radio has links with the UK Student Radio Association, which provides professional guidance, as well as workshops with industry leaders and hosts and annual conference, which Xtreme Radio hosted in Swansea in 2019. The stations motto is "The Soundtrack to Your Student Life".

=== SUTV ===
SUTV (formally known as SU Media Society, Waterfront TV & SU-TV) was founded in 2012-2013 by two undergraduate students who wanted to give others the platform to make films of their own. SUTV closed at the end of the 2014/15 academic year, since the founder graduated with no new committee members to continue the group. Xtreme Radio later picked up SUTV to prevent it from being taken over by Swansea University Computing Society. They promote and publicise the students' experience at university through events, societies and sports, while also offering coverage of Students' Union and University events. Video content and live broadcasts are designed to inform and entertain its audiences with truth and fairness at its forefront.

== Financial Information ==
Between 20 March 1967, and 19 June 2002, the Students' Union was a registered charity. During 2002 the Union withdrew from the Charities Commission, after the law changed in 2001 and enjoyed 'Exempt Charity' status, as set out by UK legislation .

From 26 November 2012, the Students' Union once again became a charity.

== Guinness World records ==
The Swansea University Students' Union has played a part in achieving two Guinness World Records in association with online fancy dress retailer Jokers' Masquerade. In 2009 both worked together to break the world record for the largest gathering of Smurfs. In 2011 they again joined forces to break the largest gathering of skeletons record.

== Pole Fitness Controversy ==
In October 2013 Swansea Students' Union trustee board banned the University's Pole Fitness society, citing "sexist attitudes" following a motion to the Trustee Board by external Trustee Ali Morris. They listed among their reasoning that "Pole fitness and pole dancing are a direct spin off from lap dancing [...] We should not be deaf to the very real issue of pole fitness playing a part in upholding this raunch culture and objectification of women and girls and the impact of this on our female students [...] Evidence shows that young women aged 16 to 24 are the group of women who experience the most domestic and sexual violence. This is the age of a large group of our female students. We believe that activities such as 'pole fitness' contributes to an atmosphere where women are viewed as sexual objects and where violence against them is acceptable."

The decision has sparked a significant backlash in social media and news sites.

The Union U-turned on their original policy and the society was fully reinstated.
