= Jokers' Masquerade =

English online retailer

- Industry: Online Retail
- Founded: 2001
- Headquarters: Luton, United Kingdom
- Products: Fancy dress
- Website: www.joke.co.uk

Jokers' Masquerade is an online retailer selling fancy dress costumes and accessories.

== History ==
Founded in 2001, the company was originally an online joke shop run by owners Mark and Sandra Lewis. Following the lack of availability of fancy dress in the local area, they decided to add fancy dress costumes to the site in an attempt to see if there was demand for online fancy dress.

== Guinness World Records ==
Jokers' Masquerade holds two Guinness World Records. It attained both in association with The Swansea University Students' Union, based in Wales. In 2009 both worked together to break the world record for the largest gathering of Smurfs. In 2011 they again joined forces to break the largest gathering of skeletons world record.

== Awards ==
- Eurobest European Advertising Festival - In 2006, Bronze award for creative excellence
- eCommerce Awards - In October 2012, Jokers' Masquerade won the Best e-Retailer Delivery Award
