= Apartment A Go Go =

Apartment A Go Go was a Santa Ana, California beer bar where female dancers appeared fully nude in the late 1960s. The business also presented amateur porn movies that were untitled and without sound. The establishment became involved in litigation in April 1969. At that time a California Superior Court judge refused to dissolve a restraining order requested by the owner of the business, Harry Maselli. Judge Claude M. Owens referred to the dancing exhibitions as dirt for money's sake. However he refused to prohibit nude movies which were previously banned in a temporary restraining order obtained on April 4, 1969.

The court ruled that his decision was based on the Red Light Abatement Act which applied to houses of prostitution. The restraining order specifically prohibited nude dancing at the Apartment A Go Go. Attorney Berrien E. Moore contended that the Orange County, California district attorney applied the red light abatement statute in an illegal manner pertaining to the issue. He believed that what was then referred to as bottomless dancing was protected by the First Amendment, which guaranteed free speech.

Orange County District Attorney Cecil Hicks succeeded in obtaining preliminary injunctions against four other Orange County bars which also allowed all nude dancing. He conceded that without new local legislation, topless dancing was permitted by the freedom of speech amendment. In July 1969 Sacramento, California Municipal Court Judge Earl Warren Jr. issued a thirteen-page opinion pertaining to the issue. He acquitted two bottomless dancers of indecent exposure charges on the grounds that the entertainment contained no movements which would be out of place in any setting where modern dancing is engaged in by the public.
