= Ripped to Shreds =

American death metal band

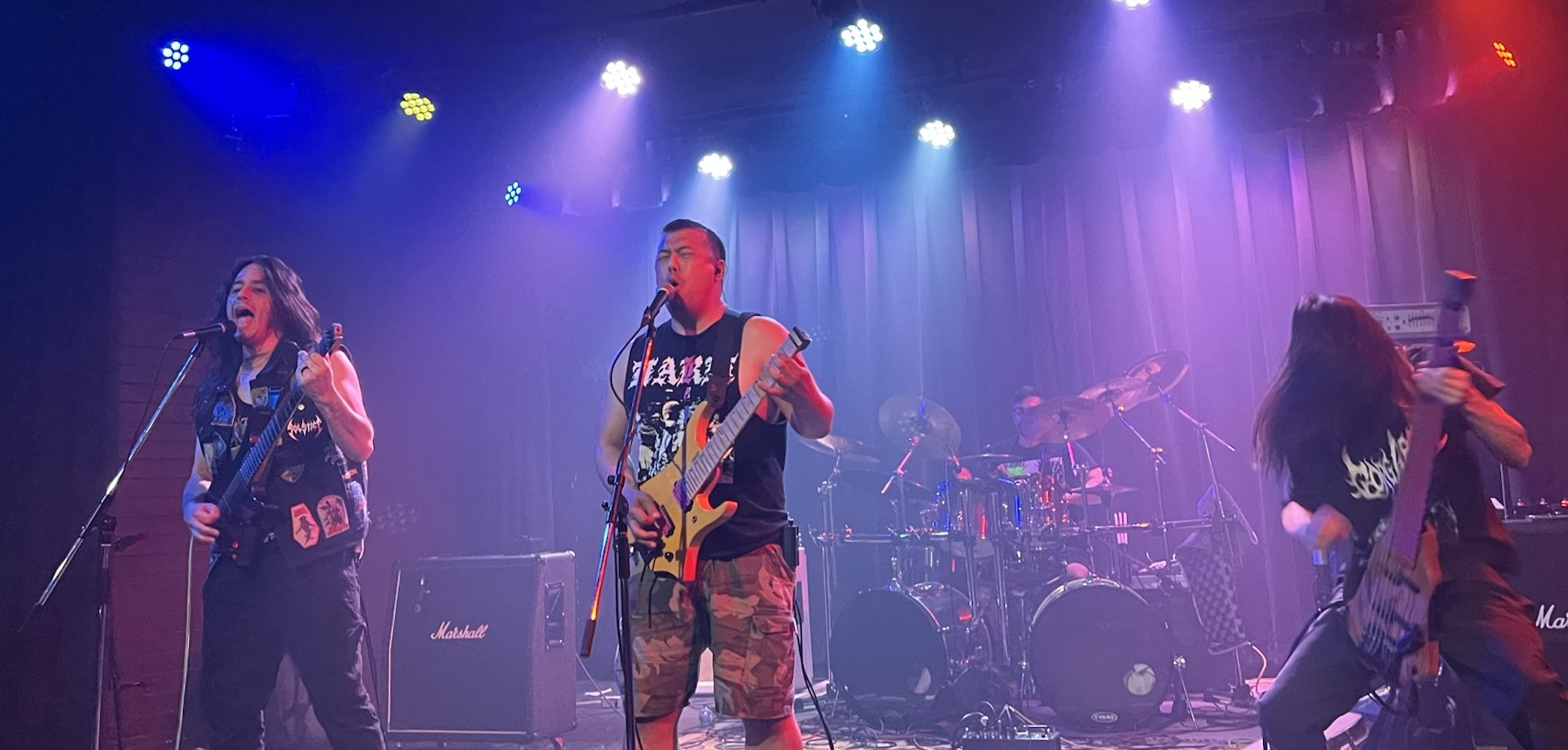
- Ripped to Shreds performing in 2025.

Background information
- Origin: San Jose, California, USA
- Genre: Death metal
- Years active: 2016-present
- Label: Relapse Records
- Members: Andrew Lee; Ryan Calaveras; Brian Do; Michael Chavez

Ripped to Shreds is an American death metal band from San Jose, California. Andrew Lee formed the band as a solo-project in 2016, and the band has since expanded to feature four members. The band writes songs focusing on Chinese folklore, history, and wuxia. The band is influenced by their experiences as Asian-Americans and American-born Chinese.

== History ==
=== 2016-2020: Founding, early years, 埋葬 (Maizang) and 亂 (Luan) ===
Andrew Lee formed Ripped to Shreds in 2016 and their debut album, 埋葬 (Maizang), was released in 2018. Lee recorded all of the music himself in his parents' basement, and Damian Herring of Horrendous mixed and mastered the album. 埋葬 (Maizang) is a concept album about Chinese funeral customs with reflection throughout on Lee's Han Chinese heritage. 埋葬 (Maizang) received universal acclaim on release.

Lee followed this up with the 2019 EP 魔經 - Demon Scriptures, which was inspired by Lee's experiences as a Taiwanese-American. 魔經 - Demon Scriptures was the start of the band's song cycle Sun Moon Holy Cult, which has had a new song featured on every release since. The cycle is inspired by novels by Chinese author Jin Yong.

In 2020, the band released their second LP, 亂 (Luan) through Pulverised Records. The record was the first to feature multiple musicians, including Takafumi Matsubara of Gridlink, Phil Tougas of Chthe'ilist and Damian Herring of Horrendous. Following the release of Luan, bassist Ryan Cavaleras and drummer Brian Do joined the band in 2020.

In 2020 the band recorded a cover of Unholy Grave's "No racial superiority!" for an anti-racism benefit compilation called Overgrow to Overthrow alongside a variety of metal and punk bands including Chat Pile, Krallice, and Panopticon.

=== 2021-Present: 劇變 (Jubian) and 三屍 (Sanshi) ===
In 2021, RTS signed with Relapse Records, who released their 2022 album 劇變 (Jubian). Jubian was the first album recorded to include Ryan and Brian. Michael Chavez joined the band after Jubian had been written and most of the recording had been completed.

Prior to the release of their fourth studio album, Ripped to Shreds toured North America in April 2024. In September 2024, they released their most recent studio album, 三屍 (Sanshi), through Relapse Records. This was the first album to feature guitarist and vocalist Michael Chavez.

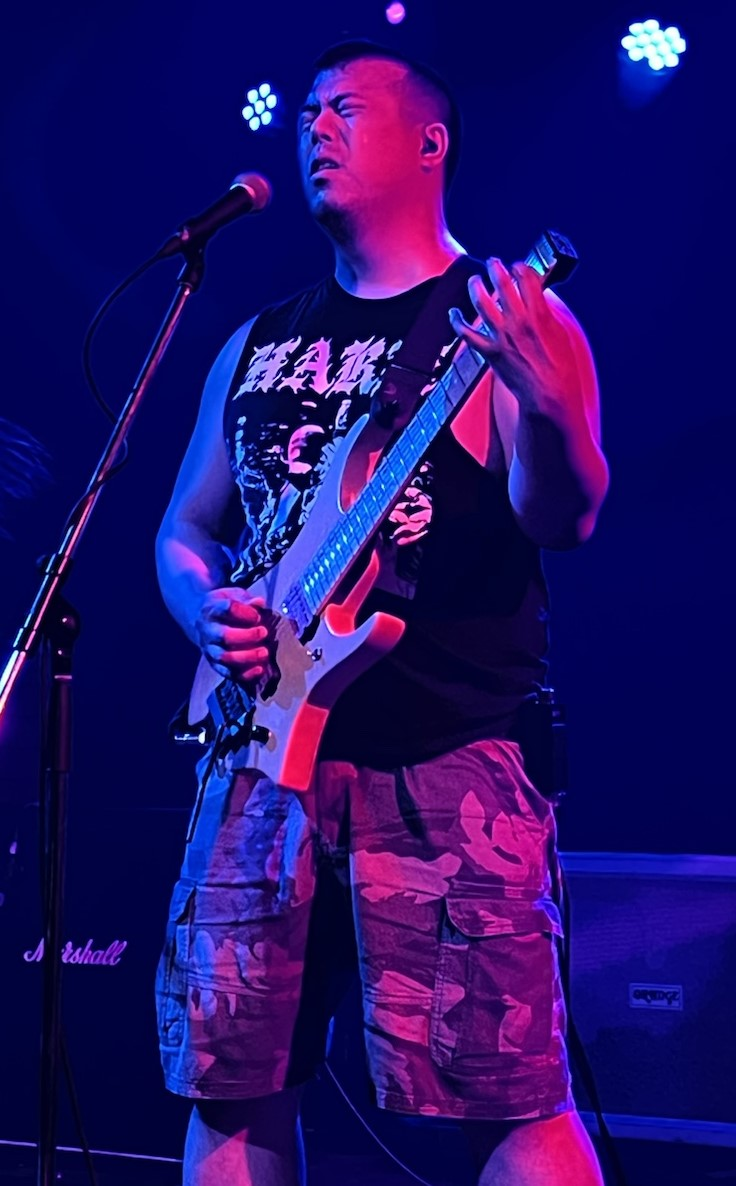
Andrew Lee performing with Ripped to Shreds in 2025.

In 2025, the band released their first live album, No Glory Here To Be Found - Live at Bandcamp. The album was recorded live at Bandcamp's studios in Oakland, California and features songs from their albums 劇變 (Jubian) and 三屍 (Sanshi). The cover art for the album is a reference to the compilation album Grind Madness at the BBC.

== Lyrical themes ==
Andrew Lee aims to increase the visibility of Asians in Eurocentric extreme metal "by being very blatantly Chinese" in his lyrics and album art. Lyrical themes explore Chinese folklore while being anti-war, anti-racist and anti-imperialist. The majority of the songs are performed in English, with some in Mandarin.

For their debut album, 埋葬 (Maizang), Lee was inspired to explore the subject of Chinese funeral rites after attending his grandfather's Buddhist funeral in 2017. The album's title has a double meaning, translating to "burial", it represents both the Chinese burial customs as well as how Lee views Asian-Americans as being "buried" and invisible in American discourse. The cover art for the album references Qingming Festival, where families clean the graves of their ancestors. Lyrically, the album focuses on different aspects of Chinese culture and history, including funeral customs, jiangu, jiangshi, and the KMT's anti-communist massacre of 1927.

The cover art for 劇變 (Jubian) features the Taiwanese sea goddess Mazu. From the album, the song "Reek of burning freedom" is about America's bombing campaign on North Korea. "Violent Compulsion For Conquest" is about the Mukden Incident, and "漢奸 (Race Traitor)" is about "the experience of existing as a minority in a country where any action is seen as representative of their whole race". Other songs on the album explore the historical figure Lao Ai and wuxia.

The cover art for their 2024 album 三屍 (Sanshi) depicts god of death Yanluo Wang and the album lyrically focuses heavily on Diyu. The title of the album references the Taoist belief of three demons living inside every human. Songs featured on the album include a song about Chinese ghost marriage, Meng Po’s “Elixir of Forgetfulness”, and another about the Taiwanese tradition of funeral strip dancing.

== Influences ==
Ripped to Shreds is strongly influenced by old-school death metal, including bands like Bolt Thrower, Entombed, Nile, and Autopsy. Andrew Lee has stated that his guitar solos are influenced by guitarists Paul Gilbert, Yngwie Malmsteen, and Allan Holdsworth. Additionally, Lee stated that he was influenced by Final Fantasy composer Nobuo Uematsu, particularly on the song Race Traitor. The band is named after two songs of the same name by Terrorizer and Horrendous.

== Controversy ==
On October 6, 2025, Ripped to Shreds released a statement on Instagram criticizing old-school death metal band Master for their scheduled appearance at the Metal Threat festival. This event notoriously featured bands linked to National Socialist black metal (NSBM), including the white supremacist band Arghoslent. RTS cancelled their scheduled show with Master over this issue and left their booking agency Heavy Talent.

The controversy deepened when, despite Andrew Lee's recent YouTube video discussing the persistence of white supremacy in heavy metal, it resurfaced that he had collaborated with a past member of Arghoslent. In a response, Lee stated that the drummer he collaborated with played in Arghoslent in the 1990s, and quit in 1996 because he did not want to be associated with the bands racism.

== Members ==
=== Current ===
- Andrew Lee – guitars, vocals (2016–present), bass, drums (2016–2020)
- Ryan Cavaleras – bass (2020–present)
- Brian Do – drums (2020–present)
- Michael Chavez – guitars, vocals (2022–present)

=== Live ===
- Kenji Tsunami - bass, keyboards (2025)

== Discography ==
=== Studio albums ===
- 埋葬 (Maizang) (2018)
- 亂 (Luan) (2020)
- 劇變 (Jubian) (2022)
- 三屍 (Sanshi) (2024)

=== Live albums ===
- No Glory Here To Be Found - Live at Bandcamp (2025)

=== EPs ===
- 魔經 - Demon Scriptures (2019)

=== Split albums ===
- Exhumed from Eastern Tombs (Brain Corrosion / Ripped to Shreds) (2020)

=== Demos ===
- Eight Immortals Feast (2019)

=== Singles ===
- "Opening Salvo" (2020)
- "Rotting Stenches Unknown" (2020)
- "燒冥紙 (Sacrificial Fire)" (2021)

=== Music videos ===
List of music videos, showing year released and director
Year	Title	Album	Director(s)
2022	"Reek Of Burning Freedom"	劇變 (Jubian)	Kevin Burleigh
2024	"Perverting The Funeral Rites, Stripping For The Dead"	三屍 (Sanshi)	施捷睿 JR Shih
2024	"殭屍復活 (Horrendous Corpse Resurrection)"	三屍 (Sanshi)	Joe Berlinger
