= Funeral stripper =

Exotic dancer at funerals

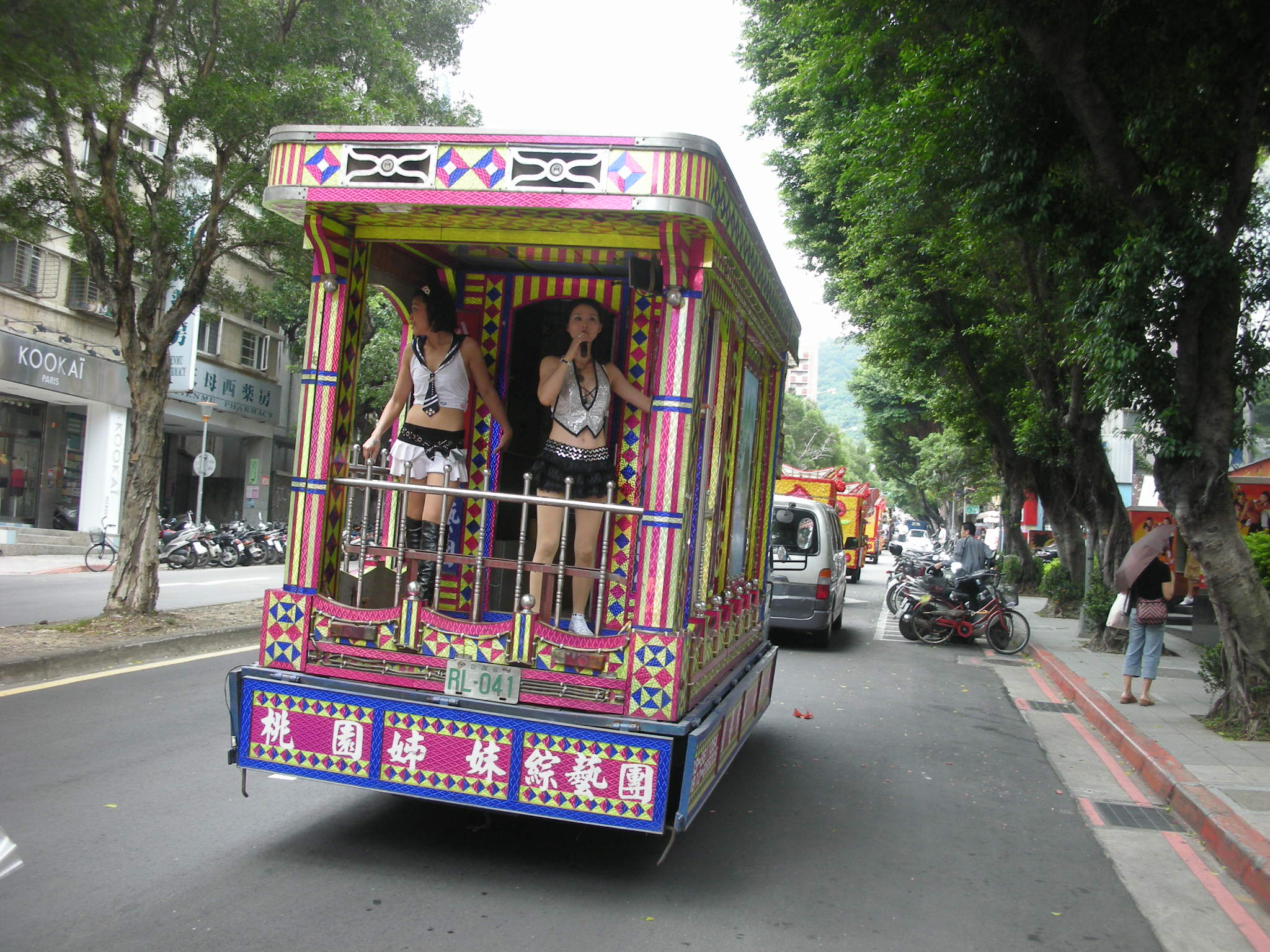
Riding in an Electric Flower Car in Taiwan, 2008

Funeral strippers are exotic dancers, usually young women, who sing and dance and perform a striptease by removing their clothes at a funeral or in a procession to a funeral as a way to celebrate the life of the deceased and to attract mourners. Funeral stripping originated and is most common in Taiwan but it is unknown how the tradition came to be. It spread to rural regions of mainland China but the Chinese government has attempted to end this practise, deeming it offensive and obscene.

== Background ==
As a rite of passage, funerals around the world often have singing and dancing to mark the occasion, although the practice of stripping naked is rare. In Taiwan, one custom has been to hire professional entertainers to perform at funerals, such as a professional mourner, to assist a family with setting a proper mood, particularly when relatives were distant or had trouble attending the funeral. The practice of hiring funeral strippers may have grown out of this practice. According to BBC News, hiring professionals to assist with funerals is undergoing change.

Historical records of women stripping at temple events date back to the late 1800s.

== Description ==
The purpose of the strippers is not only to attract crowds but to "appease wandering spirits" as well as give the deceased "one last hurrah". What happens in a performance can vary considerably, and may include climbing poles, sound systems, professional musicians, electric "flower carts", neon-lit stages, fireworks and gas-driven fire flames. One report found that in rural parts of China, there were a dozen "funeral performance troupes" which put on shows regularly, sometimes twenty in a month, and were paid roughly 2,000 yuan (about $322) for each performance.

Sometimes dancers remove bras and/or panties in front of young children, which can cause consternation. In some Asian cultures, particularly in Taiwan, the impetus for exotic dancing is that the family members want to have a well-attended funeral "to ensure that the deceased travels well into the afterlife"; in addition, like having a well-attended wedding, having many people at a funeral is a mark of prestige, and bringing entertainment to a funeral is one way to accomplish this.

The practice is controversial in places such as China, where authorities have taken steps to discourage mourners from hiring erotic entertainment. Videos of exotic dancing at funerals have been distributed to media-sharing sites such as YouTube, causing some embarrassment to officials when the videos are seen around the world. The practice often occurs in rural areas; in some cases, authorities have meted out punishments to try to deter the activity, but not before a similar crackdown attempt 9 years earlier. According to one report, the practice originated in Taiwan, and was noted in 1980, but it usually happens not in big cities but in rural areas, as well as rural areas of mainland China. Another theory is that the practice of funeral strippers is based on a "worship of reproduction" as a way to honor the deceased wishes to be "blessed with many children," according to a report in BBC News quoting Huang Jianxing, a professor at Fujian Normal University.

== Funerals of prominent people ==
In 2017, 50 pole dancers performed during the funeral procession of former Chiayi City county council speaker Tung Hsiang in Chiayi City, southern Taiwan.

== Variants ==
Instead of strippers, there are funerals featuring female funeral marching bands or cheerleaders.

== In popular culture ==
- In 2011, Marc L. Moskowitz of the University of South Carolina made a documentary titled Dancing for the Dead: Funeral Strippers in Taiwan.
- Taboo season 9 episode 'Bizarre Burials' features funeral strippers.
- American death metal band Ripped to Shreds' song "Perverting The Funeral Rites, Stripping For The Dead" is inspired by funeral stripping.
