= International Pole Sports Federation =

Nonprofit sports organization

The International Pole and Aerial Sports Federation (IPSF) is a not-for-profit global organization that has been recognized as an Observer Member by the Global Association of International Sports Federations (GAISF) as the international governing body for pole sports. It is also a member of The Association for International Sport for All (TAFISA). The IPSF is the umbrella organization for national pole federations and hosts the annual World Pole and Aerial Championships.

== Background and history ==
Pole sports involves the use of metal poles where athletes engage in acrobatic and artistic movements and tricks choreographed to music. In the 1990s and 2000s, pole dance developed into a fitness activity. In 2009, Katie Coates and Tim Trautman formed the IPSF to promote pole as a sport. They felt that as pole dance was developing as a sport, it was spread out in local competitions with irregular standards, and they wanted to bring structure and fair play to further its development and professionalization. The IPSF is governed by an executive committee.

The IPSF has created rules and regulations to govern pole sports, such as a code of points, policies regarding health and safety, and certification for sports officials. National federations work with the IPSF on implementing these standards in national pole sports competitions. National pole sports federations associated with the IPSF now exist in multiple continents, from Africa to Asia, and other federations are in the process of creating a structured plan to become endorsed by the IPSF. National federations send their top competitors to the World Pole Championships hosted by the IPSF. The IPSF is one of the signatories of the World Anti-Doping Code through the World Anti-Doping Agency (a code which arose through the impetus of the International Olympic Committee (IOC)). In 2012, the IPSF began the annual World Pole Championships where men, women, and youth athletes compete. In 2017, 229 athletes from 36 countries participated. Viewers could view the competition live online via livestream. The IPSF has partnered with SolidSport to produce and promote viewership of the championships.

The IPSF has met with the International Olympic Committee (IOC) and has stated that one of its goals is to make pole sports an Olympic sport. Their efforts to do so have generated international media attention for pole sports, the IPSF and its founders. Most recently, the IPSF applied to SportAccord in 2015, and was formally granted observer status by GAISF in 2017. The IPSF is in the process of receiving recognition from both AIMS and SportAccord. The media has questioned the purpose of the IPSF and whether it can be a professional sport, especially for youth athletes; the media has also reported on IPSF efforts to standardize the sport, the athleticism required within the championships the IPSF organizes, and IPSF inclusion of a range of age categories, from child athletes to masters athletes in championships. Some pole dancers are concerned that the IPSF's efforts and professionalization will promote pole sports over other forms of pole dance, for example making poling more athletic, standardized, and trick heavy to the neglect of artistry. However, other pole dancers believe that it would bring greater international recognition to the sport, potentially prompting greater funding and support for national federations and more participation from youth. Some of the IPSF's standards are designed to separate pole sports from gymnastics. The IPSF signed a three-way agreement with GAISF and FIG (the Federation of International Gymnastics) specifying conditions whereby FIG would support the IPSF's entry into GAISF.

== Disciplines ==
In addition to pole sports, the IPSF has created codes and standards for competitions in the disciplines of ultra pole, artistic pole, and para pole. Ultra pole involves rounds of trick battles between participants. Artistic pole puts more emphasis on artistic elements compared to pole sports. Para pole has been developed in line with Paralympic and Special Olympic criteria to now include four categories, muscle, limb and sight deficiency, as well as intellectual impairment. The IPSF has also added Aerial Hoop, Aerial Pole and Aerial Silks disciplines.
