= International Pole Dance Fitness Association =

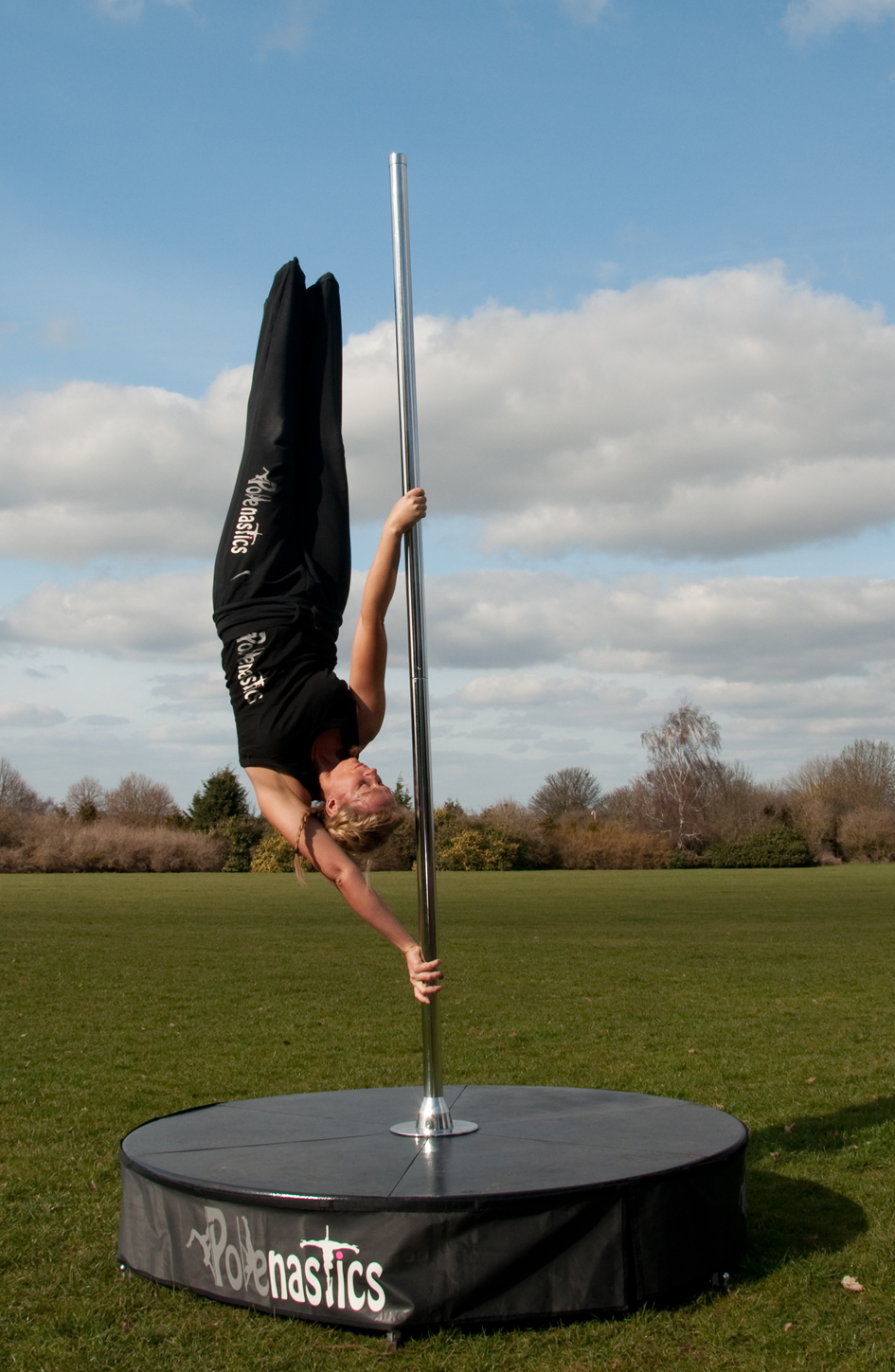
Polenastics

The International Pole Dance Fitness Association (IPDFA) promotes pole dancing as a form of fitness exercise. The organisation acts as a supervisory body for the sport and annually organizes the International Pole Championship (IPC). It has a database of pole dancing studios and instructors around the world and also trains/accredits instructors.

== International Pole Championship ==
The International Pole Championship (IPC) is an annual competition organized by International Pole Dance Fitness Association (IPDFA). It is the world's first international pole dance fitness championship where winners are credited solely for their dance skills, trick techniques and overall showmanship. Winners of national championships are granted entry to this championship. Undiscovered talents can submit a video entry via the IPC website where the winner of online voting gains, along with the title Pole Idol, sponsorship to the Grand Finals.

== IPDFA in the media ==
IPDFA has been covered by international media. Articles covering the IPC, interviews with pioneers of the sport have been reported on Associated Press, Reuters, Huffington Post and other international media. The event was covered by over 4000 media venues in 120 countries.

== Pole dance in the Olympics ==
An effort to include pole dancing in the Olympics was initiated by K. T. Coates. Przeplasko strongly supports this idea and has in many interviews highlighted this cause. IPDFA seeks to gain the International Olympic Committee's recognition of pole dance as a sport.
