= Felix Cane =

Australian pole dancer (born 1984)

Felix Cane (born 9 December 1984) is an Australian professional pole dancer, pole instructor and international champion pole dancer.

Felix Cane won her first title, Miss Pole Dance Australia 2006 after only eight months of pole dancing. The rules of Miss Pole Dance Australia stipulate a winner cannot enter the year after and Felix was a judge instead for 2007.

Cane has a certification program for pole dancing instructors and has released an application in Apple's 'App Store' and Google's 'Google Play' store with Adam Jay Photography titled Pocket Pole Studio.

Cane performed in Cirque du Soleil's Zumanity, a resident cabaret-style show at the New York-New York Hotel and Casino on the Las Vegas Strip. It is the first "adult-themed" Cirque du Soleil show, billed as "The Sensual Side of Cirque du Soleil" or "Another side of Cirque du Soleil". She featured in a solo pole performance with the Cirque du Soleil tribute to Michael Jackson.

Cane now runs a world-class pole dancing studio, Polaris Pole and Dance Studios in Perth, Western Australia. The studio is the first pole training facility in the world to offer 24 hour access to its members. Cane specialises in pole dancing, pole moves, pole flow and flexibility classes.

She also runs her own international competition, Felix Cane Pole Championships (commenced 2015), displaying the talents of peak male and female pole dancers around the world in her home town of Perth, Western Australia as well as hosting the WA heats of Miss Pole Dance Australia.

== Notable achievements ==
- Winner Miss Pole Dance Australia 2006
- Winner Miss Pole Dance Australia 2008/9
- Winner World Pole Dance 2009
- Winner World Pole Dance 2010
- Winner Miss Pole Dance Australia 2011

Australia now has several national competitions; Miss Pole Dance Australia, the Australian Capital Pole Championships, the Australia Pole Fitness Championships, Aerial All Stars, and the regional Asia Pacific Pole Championship, which includes Australia, NZ and Asia.
