= Horrendous =

American death metal band

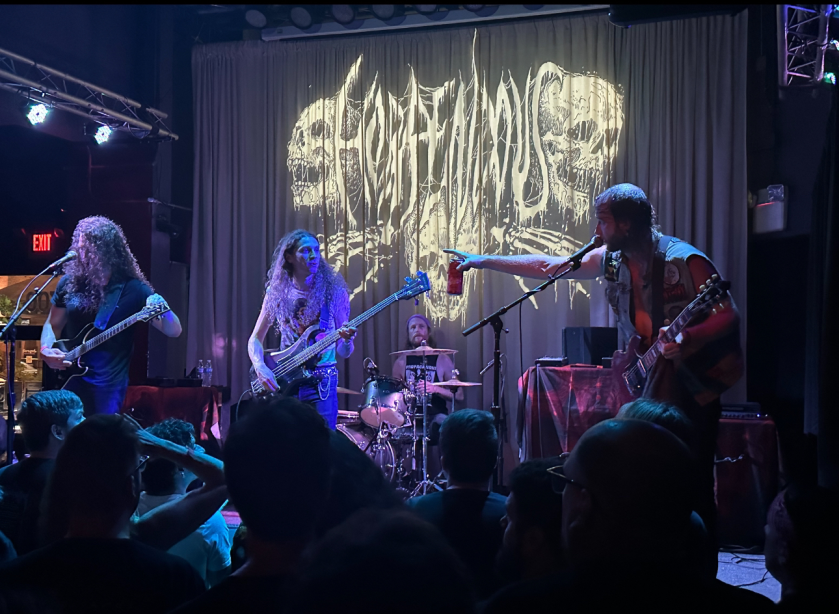
- Horrendous performing at the Metro Gallery in Baltimore, Maryland

Background information
- Origin: Philadelphia, United States
- Genres: Death metal, progressive metal
- Years active: 2009–present
- Labels: Dark Descent Records; Season of Mist
- Members: Damian Herring; Matt Knox; Jamie Knox; Alex Kulick

Horrendous is an American progressive death metal band from Philadelphia, Pennsylvania. The band has released five full-length studio albums to date, the most recent being Ontological Mysterium, released through Season of Mist on August 18, 2023.

== History ==
The band was formed by Damian Herring and brothers Matt and Jamie Knox in 2009, with bassist Alex Kulick joining the band in 2016. While the band's debut album The Chills displayed a relatively traditional approach to the death metal genre, the band has since moved towards a more progressive metal sound, a development and style which has been compared with that of Death. The band's 2014 album Ecdysis and more recent albums have received critical acclaim from major publications such as Pitchfork, Decibel, Stereogum and Spin. The band participated in Maryland Deathfest in May 2015. Their most recent album Ontological Mysterium was chosen as Decibel's top album of 2023.

== Members ==
- Damian Herring – guitars, vocals (2009–present)
- Matt Knox – guitars, vocals (2009–present)
- Jamie Knox – drums (2009–present)
- Alex Kulick – bass (2016–present)

== Discography ==
Studio albums

- The Chills (2012)
- Ecdysis (2014)
- Anareta (2015)
- Idol (2018)
- Ontological Mysterium (2023)

EPs and singles

- Sweet Blasphemies (2009)
- Sentenced (2016)
