= Pole dance =

Form of performing art

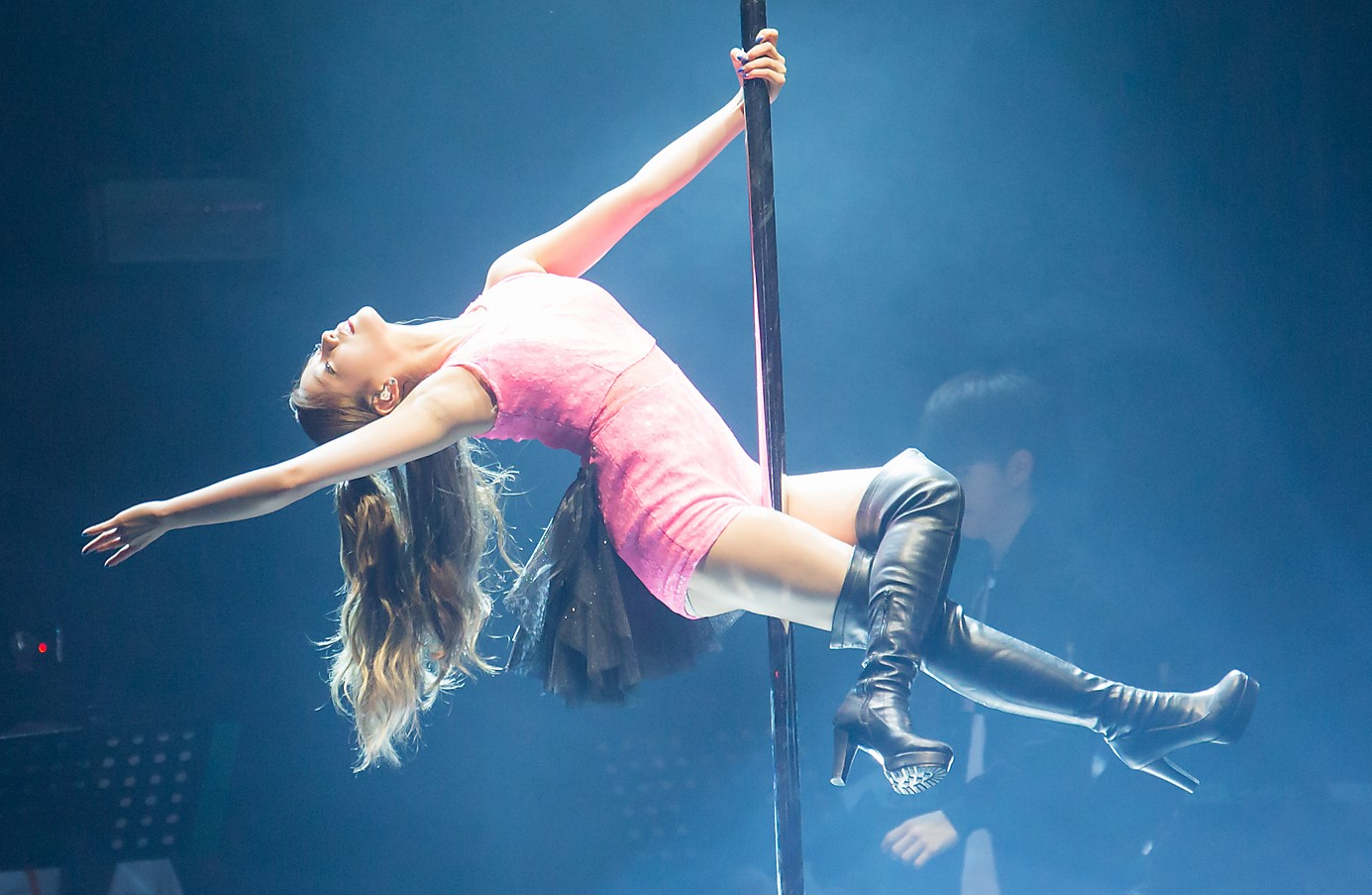
Yoon Bo-mi performing pole dance in 2015

Pole dance combines dance and acrobatics centered around a vertical pole. This performance art form takes place not only in gentleman's clubs as a form of erotic dance, but also as a mainstream form of fitness, practiced in gyms and dedicated dance studios. Amateur and professional pole dancing competitions are held in countries around the world, and the discipline has evolved into different styles, such as pole sport, pole art, exotic pole, and pole theatre. Nowadays, while the sensual aspect of pole can still be expressed by the practitioners, especially in the exotic pole category, it is not predominant. Pole increasingly attracts not only women, but also men and children, as the sport becomes increasingly professionalized.

Pole dance requires significant muscular endurance, coordination, strength, flexibility, upper body and core stability, as well as artistry. As such, proper instruction and rigorous training are necessary to attain proficiency. Today, pole performances by exotic dancers range from basic spins and striptease in more intimate clubs to athletic moves such as climbs and body inversions in the "stage heavy" clubs of Las Vegas and Miami. Dancer Remy Redd at the King of Diamonds, for example, is famous for flipping herself upside down into a split and hanging from the ceiling. Since the mid-2000s, promoters of pole dance fitness competitions have tried to change peoples' perception of pole dance to include pole fitness as a non-sexual form of dance and acrobatics and are trying to move pole into the Olympics as pole sports.

Pole dance is regarded as a form of exercise which can be used as both an aerobic and anaerobic workout. Recognized schools and qualifications are now commonplace.

== History ==
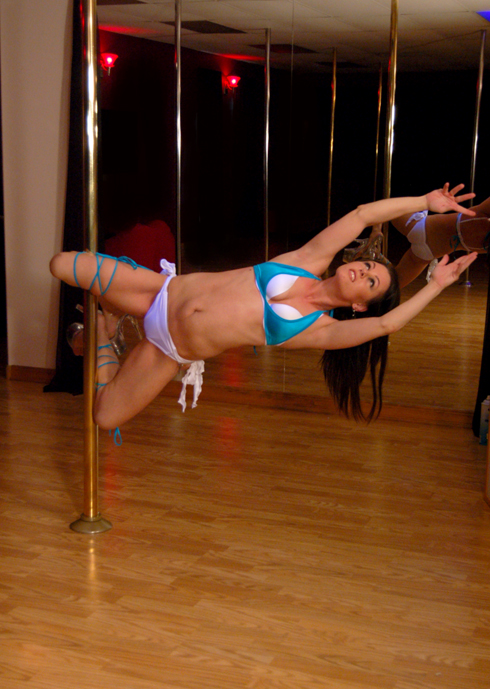
Pole dancer performing

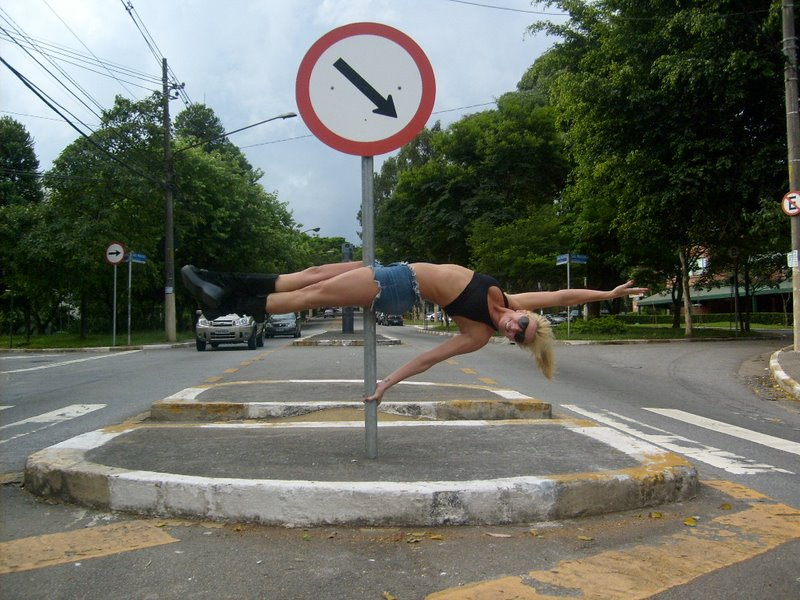
Pole dancer using a street pole

The use of a pole for sports and exercise dates back at least 800 years to the traditional Indian sport of mallakhamb, which employs endurance and strength principles with a wooden pole wider in diameter than a modern standard pole. The Chinese pole, dating back to the 12th century, uses two poles on which men would perform "gravity-defying tricks" as they leap from pole to pole, at approximately twenty feet in the air.

Pole dance in America has its roots in the "Little Egypt" traveling sideshows of the 1890s, which featured sensual "Kouta Kouta" or "Hoochie Coochie" belly dances, performed mostly by Ghawazi dancers making their first appearance in America. In an era where women dressed modestly in corsets, the dancers, dressed in short skirts and richly adorned in jewelry, caused quite a stir. During the 1920s, dancers introduced pole by sensually gyrating on the wooden tent poles to attract crowds.

The rock and roll invasion in the 1950s saw the introduction of the pole to a broader audience, with Elvis Presley's "Jailhouse Rock" movie and video in 1957. The video featured Presley's famous gyrating hips as well as numerous pole slides, grinds, and twirls. Eventually, the pole dancing moved from tents to bars and combined with burlesque dance. Since the 1980s, pole dancing has incorporated athletic moves such as climbs, spins, and inversions into striptease routines, first in Canada and then in the United States. In the 1990s, pole dancing commenced being taught as art by Fawnia Mondey, a Canadian who moved to Las Vegas, US. She is known as the world's first pole dancing instructor. Since then, pole dancing classes have become a popular form of recreational and competitive sport, practiced and performed in a variety of sexual, non-sexual, and athletic settings.

K.T. Coates, a famed competitive pole dancer, and the International Pole Sports Federation, are currently promoting a campaign to include competitive pole dance in the Olympics and an application was made to the International Olympic Committee to recognise pole as a sport in September 2016. Numerous competitions exist, including the World Pole Sport Championship, U.S. Pole Federation Championship, Pole Art, Miss Pole Dance America, and the International Pole Masters Cup Championship.

== The pole ==
=== Standard pole ===
There are various dance pole types to suit different performance situations. Dance poles may be permanent or portable, have different sizes, have spinning and static modes, have different coatings, or be made from different materials.

The standard dance pole typically consists of a hollow chrome, steel, or brass pole with a circular cross-section, running from floor to ceiling. Affixing at the ceiling gives more stability but is not always realized, especially at nightclubs with higher roofs or at transportable devices. Dance poles that are permanent are fixed to the ceiling supported by a beam located in the roof, and they are set to the floor by different brackets and bearings. Portable poles are attached to a base or a mobile stage and do not need to be attached to the ceiling. These poles can easily be removed, dismantled, and fit into cases for transport.

Poles come in a variety of diameters – 50 mm, 48 mm, 45 mm, 42 mm, 40 mm and 38 mm. The diameter used normally depends on personal preferences and what the pole will be used for—e.g., competitions or studio use. In the United States, the diameter is usually 50 mm (2 inches), or the now more popular 45 mm (1.75 inches), allowing it to be gripped comfortably with one hand. In Asia, the diameter is usually 45 mm or less. In Australia, a 38 mm pole is popular.

Poles come in various materials and coatings, each of which possesses its own properties, advantages, and disadvantages. The materials poles are made of are brass, titanium–gold, stainless steel and chrome. The brass and titanium–gold poles are gold in colour and are used to enhance the grip between the pole and the dancer, and are normally used by more advanced dancers. The stainless steel poles are not as popular as the other types as they do not have the finest grip; however, they are used by dancers with sensitive skin. The chrome poles are silver in colour and are most popular amongst beginners. The finishes some dance poles may possess are silicone sleeves and powder coatings. Silicone sleeves can provide maximum grip, although there are safety precautions dancers must consider before using silicone sleeves. These measures may include a great amount of clothing worn by the dancer or performing only static moves. Poles that are coated in powder provide improved friction and grip for dancers.

Dance poles may have two different modes, spinning and static. In the spinning mode, the pole uses ball bearings to spin. This mode can be used to complete more experienced pole moves, make moves easier to complete, and add a more dramatic effect to the move. Most spinning poles can also be fixed to the static mode where the pole cannot rotate. The static mode is regularly used when pole dancing is first taught to beginners.

Products such as chalk or alcohol-silica solutions may be used to help "stick" to the pole. Competitions may limit which products performers use.

=== Show pole ===
There are now poles available for use in clubs that provide visual effects. These poles are made with clear plastics and contain water, glitter, and unique reflective materials, which stand out when used in conjunction with strobe lighting, as well as lighting hidden in their base joists. However, these poles are not favorable to a dancer wanting to achieve better pole tricks as they bend slightly and tend to create a friction burn when slid down with any speed.

== As exercise ==
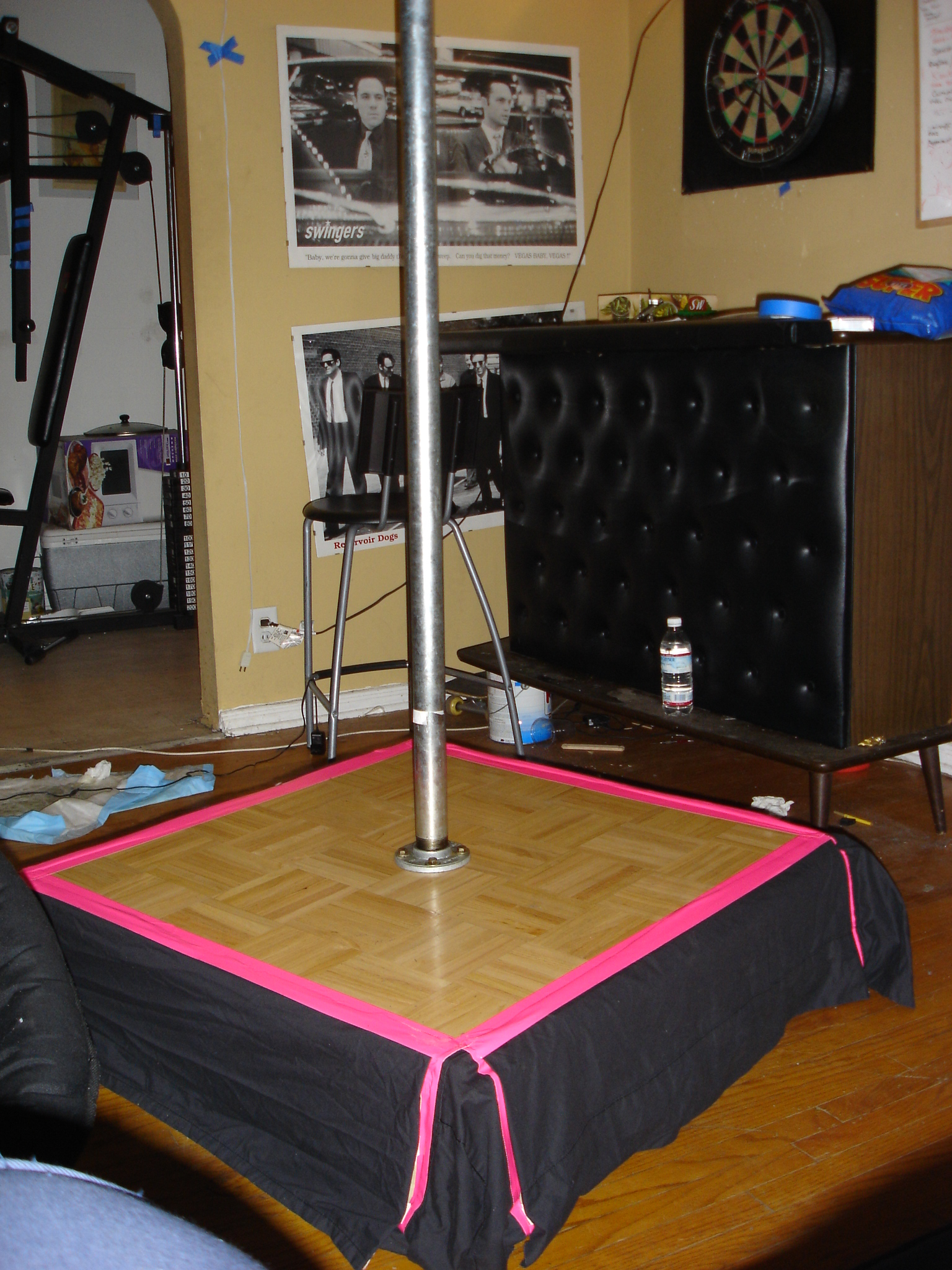
A home version stage pole

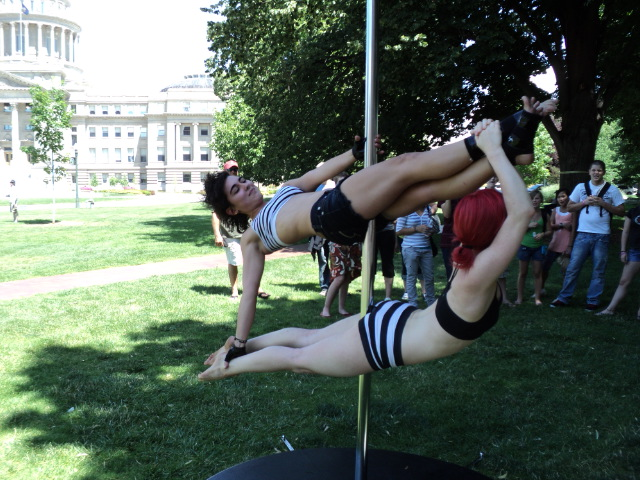
Pole dancing demonstration near the Idaho State Capitol

Pole dancing has gained popularity as a form of exercise with increased awareness of the benefits to general strength and fitness. These forms of exercise increase core and general body strength by using the body itself as resistance while toning the body as a whole. A typical pole dance exercise regimen in class begins with strength training, dance-based moves, squats, push-ups, and sit-ups and gradually works its way up to the spins, climbs and inversions which are the métier of the exercise. Pole dancing is also generally reported by its schools to be empowering for women in terms of building self-confidence, in terms of which its erotic components are still the subject of some controversy.

A growing number of men are incorporating pole dancing into their fitness programmes. In Australia, the UK and the US, dance studios are beginning to offer classes just for men. And in China, 2007's National Pole Dancing competition was won by a man. Dance instructor Zhang Peng, 23, beat a host of women dancers to the top prize.

== Recreational pole ==
Since 2003, pole dancing has been transitioning from an exotic performance to a recreational activity. Pole dancing as a sport differs from pole dancing as a recreation as recreational pole dancing is undertaken mainly for enjoyment rather than fitness. Whilst undertaking pole class, students will learn a variety of different ways to use the pole to execute spins, tricks, climbs, hangs, drops and flips.

== Competitions ==
Pole dance competitions began in the United States with the Deja Vu chain of strip clubs in 1991 with an event called the Po'Lympics, which was held annually throughout the decade. These competitions led to the creation of numerous other competitions that followed, both in the strip club industry and fitness.

A wide range of amateur and professional competitions are held in many countries worldwide. They are strictly non-nude and focus on pole dance as an athletic and artistic form of dance and fitness. The first "Miss Pole Dance World" competition was held in November 2005 in Amsterdam and Elena Gibson from the UK won the championship. The following day Elena was disqualified by the organizer John Benner amongst much controversy and the title went to the runner up Reiko Suemune from Japan.

=== Pole sports ===
A group of advocates pushed for pole dance to be represented as a test event in the 2012 London Olympics. However, since this was a relatively new trend, there was no standardized scoring for competitions and technique descriptions vary among clubs in different regions at that time.

To overcome this, in 2009 the International Pole Sports Federation was founded to turn pole dance into a sport, pole sport. The IPSF has since then created rules and regulations to govern pole sports, such as a code of points, policies regarding health and safety, and certification for sports officials. National federations work with the IPSF on implementing these standards in national pole sports competitions. National pole sports federations associated with the IPSF now exist in multiple continents, from Africa to Asia, and other federations are in the process of creating a structured plan to become endorsed by the IPSF. The IPSF each year arrange the World Pole Championships to which each country with an associated national pole sports federation sends their top pole dancers. IPSF is again working on getting the sport recognized and to become an Olympic Sport.

== In the media ==
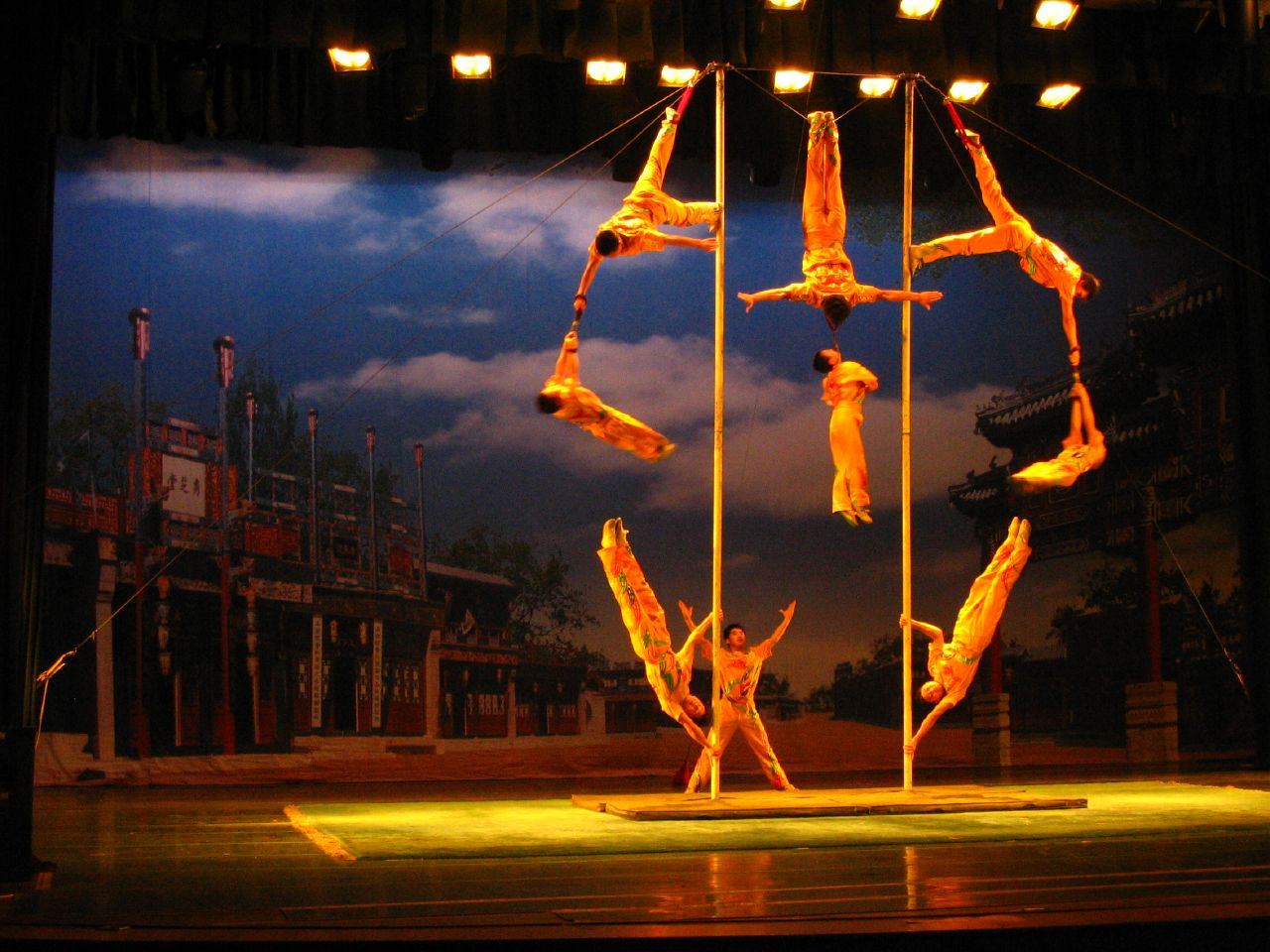
Chinese pole acrobats perform

In 1993, in Madonna's world tour The Girlie Show, dancer Carrie Ann Inaba performed on a tall go-go pole as an intro to the show. This was followed by Madonna's performance of "Erotica".

Pole dancing, which has been featured on Desperate Housewives and The View, like other exercise trends has its share of celebrity following. Jennifer Love Hewitt had a short pole dancing stint in an episode of Ghost Whisperer. Actress Sheila Kelley was so taken with the sport, which she learned while preparing for her role in Dancing at the Blue Iguana, that she launched her pole-based exercise program.

In January 2009, Felix Cane (Miss Pole Dance World champion 2009 and 2010) joined Cirque Du Soleil's Zumanity show in Las Vegas, promoted on The Tyra Banks Show in 2010.

Rima Fakih's victory at Miss USA 2010, including the fact that she had won a pole-dancing competition three years earlier, attracted media attention.

Taiwanese pop singer Jolin Tsai showed her pole dancing skills in the music videos of "Agent J" and "Beast". She also gave a double pole-dancing live performance during her Myself World Tour in Kaohsiung, Taiwan.

Pole dance has its own media, the magazines Pole Spin and Vertical.

In the video game Bayonetta, the titular character uses pole dancing to advance to the next area or combat her foes. In the ending credit to the game, she is seen dancing on the pole. If you get a platinum award, you'll hear her say, "I should have been a pole dancer".

Pole dancing has been incorporated in the performances of some K-Pop idols. Ga-In of the Brown Eyed Girls included a few shots of her pole dancing in the music video of her 2012 solo single "피어나 (Bloom)". Girl group After School used pole dancing extensively as part of the dance routine for their 2013 song "첫사랑 (First Love)".

Rihanna's hit single from 2013 "Pour it up" featured Professional Pole Dancer Nicole "The Pole" Williams. Nicole also danced to Bruno Mars' "Gorilla" at the MTV EMAs 2013.

Pole dancing is referenced in the fighting game Persona 4 Arena Ultimax by the fighter Shadow Rise: The Scandalous Superstar Idol whenever she wins a fight. One of her animations is where she strips her clothes off and twirls on a pole like a pole dancer, which could also reference how Rise's dungeon in the first Persona 4 game is a strip club.

In 2016, The Daily Dot ran a story which covered the attempt by some pole dancers to distance themselves from strippers, with their story "Strippers Talk Back to the hashtag #Notastripper". The story utilized the hashtag "yes a stripper" to support the origins of pole dance. On the social media platform Instagram, some pole dancers try to differentiate between their exercise method and the technique's origin by using "not a stripper" as a hashtag. The hashtag can be viewed as derogatory, and pole dancing strippers utilize "yes a stripper" as a defense against the denigration of their dance style, which was created and is used in strip clubs.

The 2019 film Hustlers brought positive attention to the sport. Focused on the lives of strippers in the wake of the 2008 financial crisis, the film cast members of the New York stripping community, including rap icon Cardi B and Lizzo. Jennifer Lopez performed intricate routines in the film—notably to Fiona Apple's "Criminal"—and went on to pole dance in the 2020 Super Bowl. After the release of the film and Lopez's subsequent interviews, pole dancing studios nationwide saw a surge in registrations.

In 2019, English musician FKA Twigs released a music video to her single "Cellophane" which includes Twigs pole dancing.

Pole dance figures heavily in the STARZ television series P-Valley.

The English singer Piri took up pole fitness while at Lancaster University, and performed it on stage as part of Froge.tour.

== See also ==
- Chinese pole
- Mallakhamba, pole and rope yoga sports of India, dating back to at least 1135 CE/AD
