= Strip club =

Sexual entertainment venue

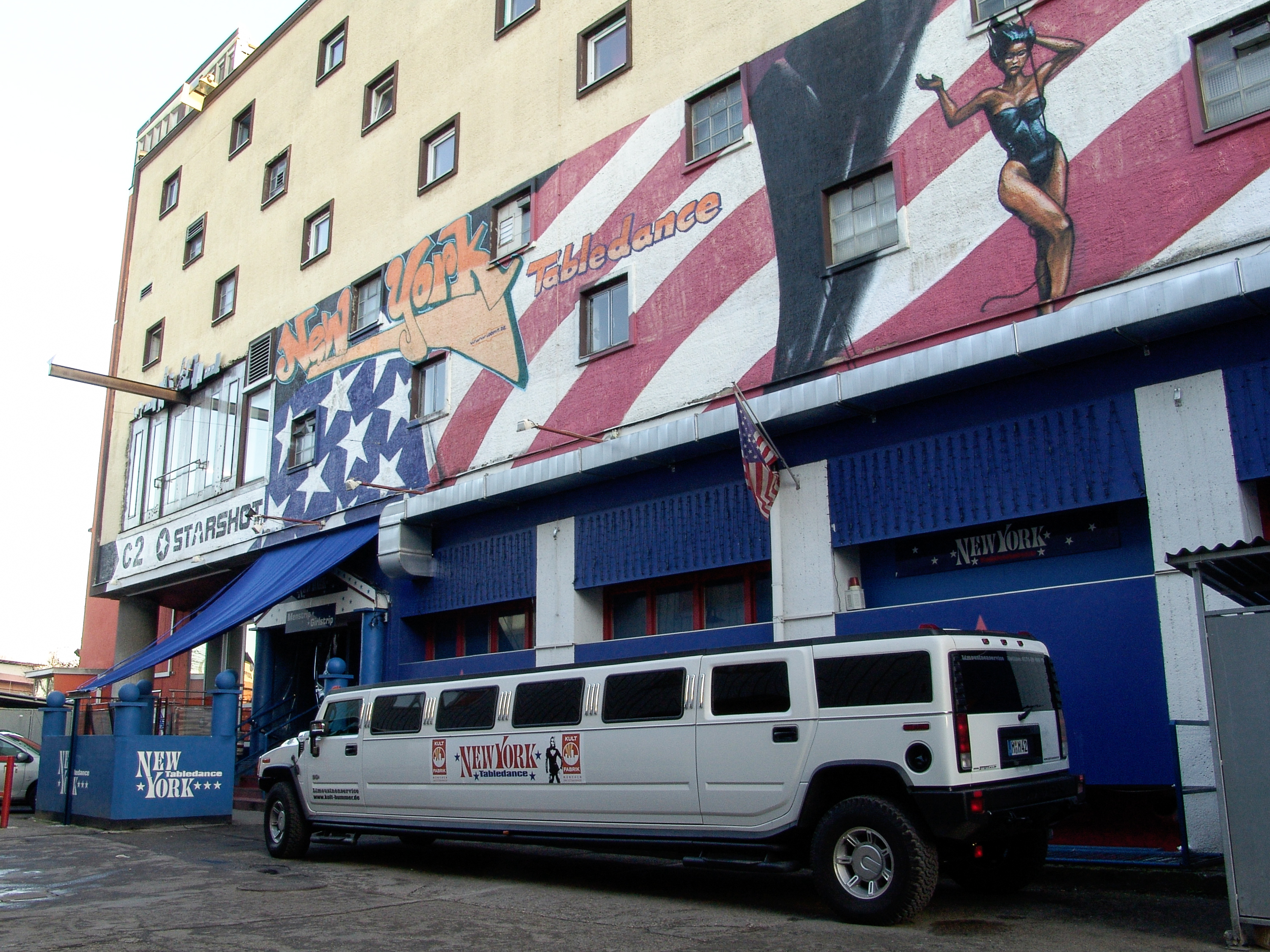
Strip club in Munich, Germany

A strip club (also known as a strip joint, striptease bar, peeler bar, gentlemen's club, among others) is a venue where strippers provide adult entertainment, predominantly in the form of striptease and other erotic dances including lap dances. Strip clubs typically adopt a nightclub or bar style, and can also adopt a theatre or cabaret-style. American-style strip clubs began to appear outside North America after World War II, arriving in Asia in the late 1980s and Europe in 1978, where they competed against the local English and French styles of striptease and erotic performances.

As of 2005, the size of the global strip club industry was estimated to be US$75 billion. In 2019, the size of the U.S. strip club industry was estimated to be US$8 billion, generating 19% of the total gross revenue in legal adult entertainment. SEC filings and state liquor control records available at that time indicated that there were at least 3,862 strip clubs in the United States, and since that time, the number of clubs in the U.S. has grown. Profitability of strip clubs, as with other service-oriented businesses, is largely driven by location and customer spending habits. The better appointed a club is, in terms of its quality of facilities, equipment, furniture, and other elements, the more likely customers are to encounter cover charges and fees for premium features such as VIP rooms.

The strip club as an outlet for salacious entertainment is a recurrent theme in popular culture. In some media, these clubs are portrayed primarily as gathering places of vice and ill repute. Clubs themselves and various aspects of the business are highlighted in these references. "Top Strip Club" lists in some media have demonstrated that U.S.-style striptease is a global phenomenon and that it has also become a culturally accepted form of entertainment, despite its scrutiny in legal circles and popular media. Popular Internet sites for strip club enthusiasts also have lists calculated from the inputs of site visitors. The legal status of strip clubs has evolved over the course of time, with national and local laws becoming progressively more liberal on the issue around the world, although some countries (such as Iceland) have implemented strict limits and bans. Strip clubs are frequent targets of litigation around the world, and the sex industry, which includes strip clubs, is a contentious issue in popular culture and politics. Some clubs have been linked to organized crime.

== History ==
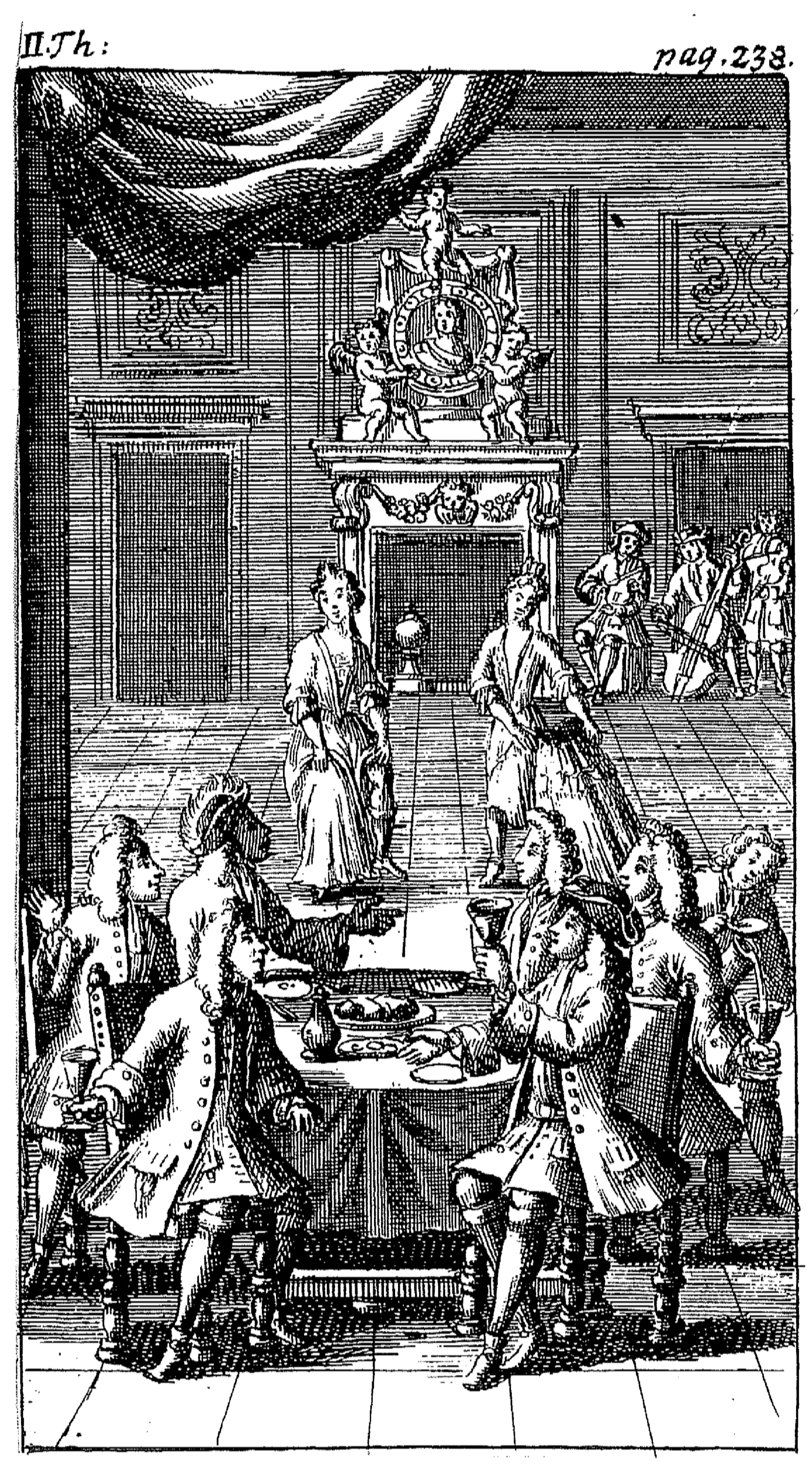
1720 depiction of a striptease event from La Guerre D'Espagne

The term "striptease" was first recorded in 1938, though "stripping", in the sense of women removing clothing to entice men, seems to go back at least 400 years. For example, in Thomas Otway's comedy The Soldier's Fortune (1681) a character says: "Be sure they be lewd, drunken, stripping whores". Its combination with music seems to be as old. A conclusive description and visualization can be found in the 1720 German translation of the French La Guerre D'Espagne (Cologne: Pierre Marteau, 1707), where a galant party of high aristocrats and opera singers has resorted to a small château where they entertain themselves with hunting, play and music in a three-day turn:

The third day, dedicated to ball and dance, was used for the finest entertainment to divert the men; their eyes were given the opportunity to see all the pleasures nature could offer; and if the pleasant aspects of a well shaped young lady are able to arouse the mind, one can say that our princes enjoyed all the delicacies of love. The dancers, to please their lovers the more, dropped their clothes and danced, totally naked, the nicest entrées and ballets; one of the princes directed the delightful music, and only the lovers were allowed to watch the performances.

Other possible influences on modern stripping were the dances of the Ghawazee "discovered" and seized upon by French colonists in 19th century North Africa and Egypt. The erotic dance of the bee, performed by a woman known as Kuchuk Hanem, was witnessed and described by the French novelist Gustave Flaubert. In this dance, the performer disrobes as she searches for an imaginary bee trapped within her garments. It is likely that the women performing these dances did not do so in an indigenous context, but rather, responded to the commercial climate for this type of entertainment.

Middle Eastern belly dance, also known as oriental dancing, was popularized in the United States after its introduction on the Midway at the 1893 World's Fair in Chicago by a dancer known as Little Egypt.

=== European tradition ===
In France during the late 19th century, Parisian shows such as the Moulin Rouge and Folies Bergère were featuring attractive, scantily clad, dancing women and tableaux vivants. In this environment, an act featuring a woman slowly removing her clothes in a vain search for a flea crawling on her body was seen in 1895 and possibly filmed in 1897 by the first female director, Alice Guy. This routine, Le coucher d'Yvette, inspired "French acts" in theaters and brothels in other parts of the world, seen in New York as early as 1878. The first public act of striptease in modern times is credited to Parisian theater in 1894.

In 1905, Dutch dancer Mata Hari, later shot as a spy by the French authorities during World War I, was an overnight success from the debut of her act at the Musée Guimet. The most celebrated segment of her act was her progressive shedding of clothing until she wore just a jeweled bra and some ornaments over her arms and head. Another landmark performance was the appearance at the Moulin Rouge, in 1907, of an actress called Germaine Aymos, who entered dressed only in three very small shells. In the 1930s, the famous Josephine Baker danced semi-nude in the danse sauvage at the Folies and other such performances were provided at the Tabarin. These shows were notable for their sophisticated choreography and for often dressing the girls in glitzy sequins and feathers. By the 1960s, "fully nude" shows were provided at such places as Le Crazy Horse Saloon.

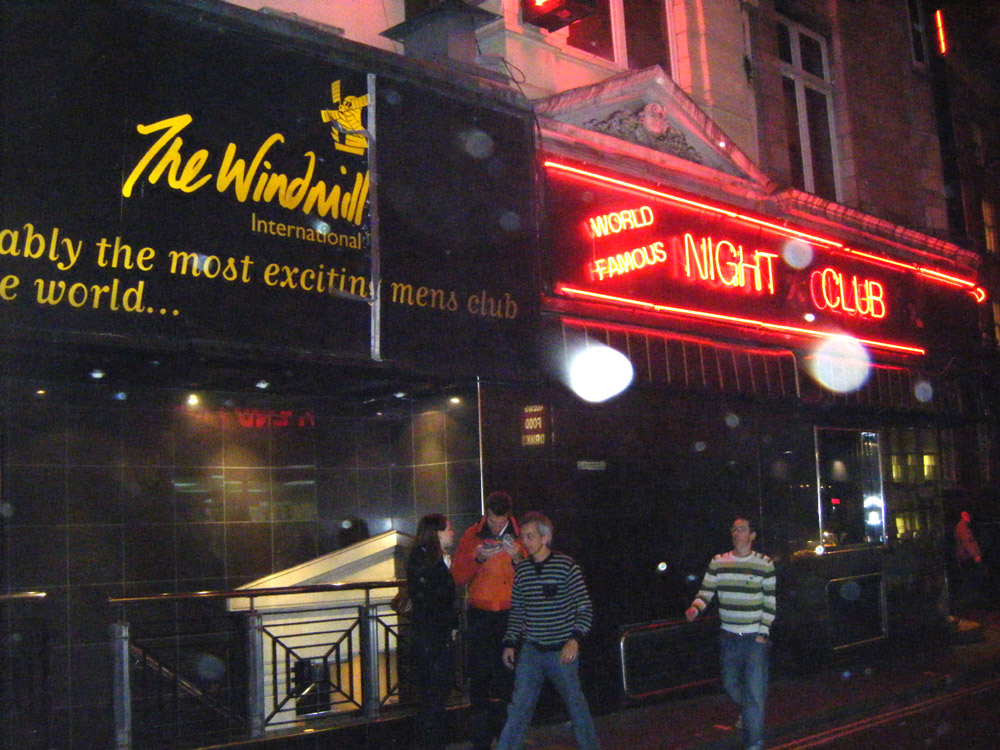
Exterior of the Windmill Theatre in Westminster, London, England

In Britain in the 1930s, Laura Henderson began presenting nude shows at the Windmill Theatre in London. At that time, British law prohibited naked girls from moving. To avoid the prohibition, the models appeared in stationary tableaux vivants. The Windmill girls also toured other London and provincial theatres, sometimes using ingenious devices such as rotating ropes to move their bodies round, though strictly speaking, staying within the letter of the law by not moving of their own volition. Another example of ways that the shows stayed within the law was the fan dance, in which a naked dancer's body was concealed by her fans and those of her attendants, until the end of her act in when she posed naked for a brief interval whilst standing still.

In 1942, Phyllis Dixey formed her own company of girls and rented the Whitehall Theatre in London to put on a review called The Whitehall Follies. By the 1950s, touring striptease acts were used to attract audiences to the dying music halls. Paul Raymond started his touring shows in 1951 and later leased the Doric Ballroom in Soho, opening his private members club, the Raymond Revuebar, in 1958. This was the first of the private striptease members' clubs in Britain.

Changes in the law in the 1960s brought about a boom of strip clubs in Soho with "fully nude" dancing and audience participation. Pubs were also used as venues, most particularly in the East End, with a concentration of such venues in the district of Shoreditch. This pub striptease seems mainly to have evolved from topless go-go dancing. Though often a target of local authority harassment, some of these pubs survive to the present day. A custom in these pubs is that the strippers walk round and collect money from customers in a beer jug before each individual performance. This custom appears to have originated in the late 1970s when topless go-go dancers first started collecting money from the audience as the fee for going "fully nude". Private dances of a more raunchy nature are sometimes available in a separate area of the pub.

=== American tradition ===
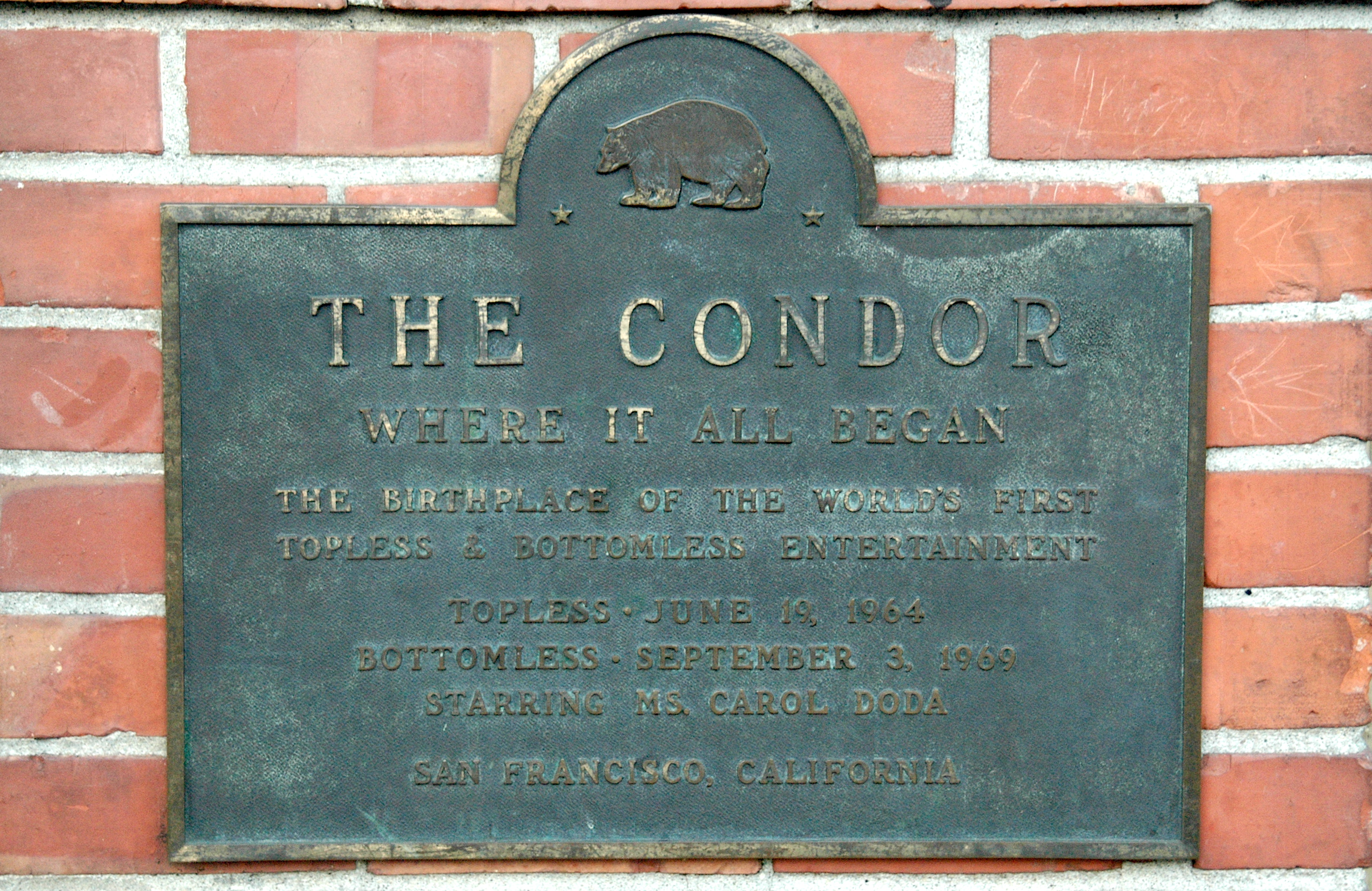
Historical marker at the original Condor Club in San Francisco, California. Today, the club is owned by Deja Vu.

In America, striptease started in traveling carnivals and burlesque theatres, and featured famous strippers such as Gypsy Rose Lee and Sally Rand. The vaudeville trapeze artist Charmion performed a "disrobing" act onstage as early as 1896, which was captured in the 1901 Edison film, Trapeze Disrobing Act. Another milestone for modern American striptease was the possibly legendary show at Minsky's Burlesque in April 1925: The Night They Raided Minsky's. The Minsky brothers brought burlesque to New York's 42nd Street. However, the burlesque theatres there were prohibited from having striptease performances in a legal ruling of 1937, leading to the later decline of these "grindhouses" (named after the bump 'n grind entertainment on offer) into venues for exploitation cinema. The concept of "strippers", as we know it today with the pole dance, has been popularized in the United States in 1972. British Columbia followed the lead around 1978.

Widespread bans on striptease had a direct influence on the creation of the strip clip joint and the exotic dancer as known today. Bans still exist; enforced now mostly at the local municipal level. American-style striptease began to appear outside North America in the post-World War II era and is now practiced widely around the world.

The 1960s saw a revival of striptease in the form of topless go-go dancing. Topless dancing was banned in certain parts of the country, similar to the bans on striptease, but it eventually merged with the older tradition of burlesque dancing. Carol Doda, of the Condor Night Club in the North Beach section of San Francisco, is credited with being the first topless go-go dancer. The club opened in 1964 and Doda's première topless dance occurred on the evening of 19 June of that year. The large lit sign in front of the club featured a picture of her with red lights on her breasts. The club went "bottomless" on 3 September 1969; launching the trend of explicit "full nudity" in American striptease dancing. It was Doda's brand of dancing which is credited with the move from striptease to stripping.

San Francisco is also the location of the notorious Mitchell Brothers O'Farrell Theatre. Originally an X-rated movie theater, this striptease club pioneered lap dancing in 1970, and was a major force in popularizing it in strip clubs on a nationwide and eventually worldwide basis. A further development in the American tradition took place with the emergence of upscale "gentlemen's clubs" in the early 1990s in large cities such as New York. Scores New York was the first major gentlemen's club, with "a gorgeous interior, high-end food and drinks, and of course stunningly beautiful women in sexy gowns. Prior to that, live adult entertainment in New York consisted largely of seedy peep show-type places", according to adult industry veteran Joe Diamond. San Francisco's Lusty Lady became known in the 1990s and early 2000s as the first strip club in the world to successfully unionize and the first to become a worker's cooperative.

=== Asian tradition ===
The Japanese term for strip club, nūdo gekijo, literally means "nude theater". An older term was "sutorippu gekijo". American-style striptease became popular in Japan during the U.S. occupation after the end of World War II (1945–1952). Some girls chose to strip in theaters as an alternative to prostitution.

When entrepreneur Shigeo Ozaki saw Gypsy Rose Lee perform, he started his own striptease revue in Tokyo's Shinjuku neighborhood. Teitoza was the first club to open in Shinjuku, on 15 January 1947. The first act was titled "The Birth of Venus". Each performance lasted for fifteen seconds and was modest by modern standards, incorporating veils, panties and a bra which covered much of what would be shown today. The woman on stage stood in a stationary pose, similar to shows in Britain. The show ran until August 1948. Theaters in Asakusa had fully nude displays, also featuring no motion or stripping. As this style of theater spread, the removal of clothing on stage was integrated into the process.

Over time, as regulations were relaxed, a variety of acts developed with shows presenting a variety of movements, such as taking a bath in an outdoor washtub. One of the most famous variants had audience members given magnifying glasses for close up views.

During the 1950s, Japanese "strip shows" became more sexually explicit and less dance-oriented, until they were eventually simply live sex shows. The strip shows in Tokyo during this time remained low key, but Osaka and Kyoto were pushing the art of striptease in Japan into new territory. In 1956, Osaka became the first city in Japan to have pubic hair on display during a strip show. Dotonbori is a well known red light district in Osaka, Japan, that has featured entertainment theaters and prostitution for hundreds of years. The strip clubs of today are the latest incarnation of its temptations.

Peeping clubs, which feature peeping rooms (nozokibeya), are businesses similar to western peep shows. Customers in peeping clubs view a female model through a hole from their own private cubicles, and then pay to watch her strip, pose, and masturbate. Kabukichō, a red light district in Tokyo, had 13 nozoki-beya in the early 1980s. The sex industry became so pervasive in Asia that by the 1990s, Kabukichō was described as a "warren of peep shows, strip clubs, and massage parlors" and Bangkok, Thailand, attained a reputation as the sex capital of the world.

== Entertainment and services ==
=== Club offerings ===
American-style strip clubs are often structured as nightclubs or bars. High-end establishments are commonly referred to as "gentlemen's clubs", complete with luxury features and services. More down-market competitors can be known by various names, such as titty bars, rippers, peelers, skin bars, girly bars, nudie bars, bikini bars or go-go bars.

Regardless of size, name, or location in the world, strip clubs can be full nude, topless or bikini. Where offered:

- Full nude routines – The performer is fully nude by the end of their performance.
- Topless – The female performer's upper body is exposed but the genital area remains covered during a performance.
- Bikini – The female performer's breasts and genital area remain covered, such as go-go dancing.

For any of the three types of clubs, there are exceptions based on the individual dancer and management. The use of pasties can alter the legal interpretation as to whether a performance is topless or not and whether a business is sexually oriented.

A club might also hire or broadcast forms of entertainment other than striptease (such as pay-per-view events), for which it earns revenue via premium fees. Some clubs have also moved into providing chat and broadcast services via the internet, including live video feeds. Beyond this more passive entertainment, some clubs' dancers offer additional services, such as lap dances or trips to the champagne room, for a set fee rather than for tips. This fee will typically include a set fee for the room, for a fixed amount of time. Lap dances may also be offered during lingerie modeling sessions. During a lap dance, the dancer dances above and around the customer's crotch while they remain clothed, in an attempt to arouse or, in the case of "extras" with contact occurring during grinding, to bring the recipient to climax. Touching of strippers is not permitted in many localities, however, some dancers and clubs allow touching of dancers during private dances. In some parts of the U.S., there are laws forbidding the exposure of female nipples, and thus dancers must cover their nipples with pasties to comply with those laws. Such clubs are known as pastie clubs.

==== Striptease ====
A striptease is an erotic or exotic dance in which the performer gradually undresses, either partly or completely, in a seductive and sensual manner. The person who performs a striptease is commonly known as a "stripper" or exotic dancer. Most strippers are female; less than a third of strippers are male strippers. Striptease and public nudity have been subject to legal and cultural prohibitions, other aesthetic considerations and taboos. Restrictions on venues may be through venue licensing requirements and constraints and a wide variety of national and local laws. These laws vary considerably around the world, and even between different parts of the same country.

Striptease involves a slow, sensuous undressing. The stripper may prolong the undressing by making sure that the sensual build-up has been properly done using techniques such as the wearing of actual clothes or putting clothes or hands in front of just undressed body parts such as the breasts or genitalia in a sensual and playful manner. The emphasis is on the act of undressing along with sexually suggestive movement, rather than the state of being undressed. In the past, the performance often finished as soon as the undressing was finished, though today's strippers usually continue dancing in the nude. The costume the stripper wears before disrobing is part of the act. In some cases, audience interaction can form part of the act, with the audience urging the stripper to remove more clothing, or the stripper approaching the audience to interact with them.

Unlike burlesque theater, the modern popular form of strip theater can minimize the interaction of customer and dancer, reducing the importance of tease in the performance in favor of speed to undress. Most clubs have a dancer rotation where each dancer, in turn, will perform for one or more songs in a fixed sequence that repeats during a shift. Less formal clubs will have dancers take turns when a stage becomes empty or have a free flow of entertainers where the stage has any number of entertainers who wander off and on at will. Featured entertainers are not usually part of the rotation and they generally have set times when they will perform that are advertised throughout the shift. If a DJ is present, they will "emcee" the rotation and typically announce the current dancer(s) on stage and possibly whom to expect in future sets.

==== Private dances ====
In peep shows, done with a customer seated in a private booth separated from a dancer by glass or plastic, there may be no music playing during a performance, in which the dancer removes their clothes and displays their body to the customer. In clubs which offer lingerie modeling shows, which are peep shows where a dancer privately dances and strips for a customer, typically without a barrier, performances can also be done with or without a formal stage or music.

Private dances in the main club zones most often take the form of table dances, lap and couch dances, and bed dances among others. An air dance is a particular form of private dance where little-to-no contact between the dancer and customer occurs. This class of dance spans the different categories listed above, and some dancers may perform air dances when more contact-heavy forms of dance were expected and paid for. Club management may set standard prices for the various dance services, but individual strippers, where permitted, will negotiate their own prices, which may be higher or lower than the advertised rate. Table dances are distinguished from other forms of dances in that they can be performed where the customer is seated, on the main floor. Table dance may also refer to a form of minimal-touch private dance where the performer is physically located on a small table in front of the customer(s). Table dances should not be confused with table stages, where the stripper is at or above eye level on a platform surrounded by chairs, and where there is usually enough table surface for customers to place drinks and tip money.

Where offered, lap dances are performed in all manner of locations and seating, ranging from plain stools and kitchen-grade chairs to plush leather armchairs. They can also be performed with the customer standing in these designated areas. A service provided by many clubs is for a customer to be placed on stage with one or more dancers for a public lap dance. Occasions for this type of performance are bachelor parties and birthdays, among others. Bed dance areas require more space because they are designed for the customer to lie supine with the entertainer(s) positioned on top of them. Bed dances are the least common of the three, and in many clubs are a more expensive option than a lap dance because of the novelty and increased level of contact between customer and service provider.

=== Customer service ===
Strip clubs are profit-oriented businesses like restaurants and other retail establishments. Performers and staff are the primary customer service representatives in the club environment. Dancers are their primary vehicle to entice customers to spend time and money in the establishment.

==== Interaction ====
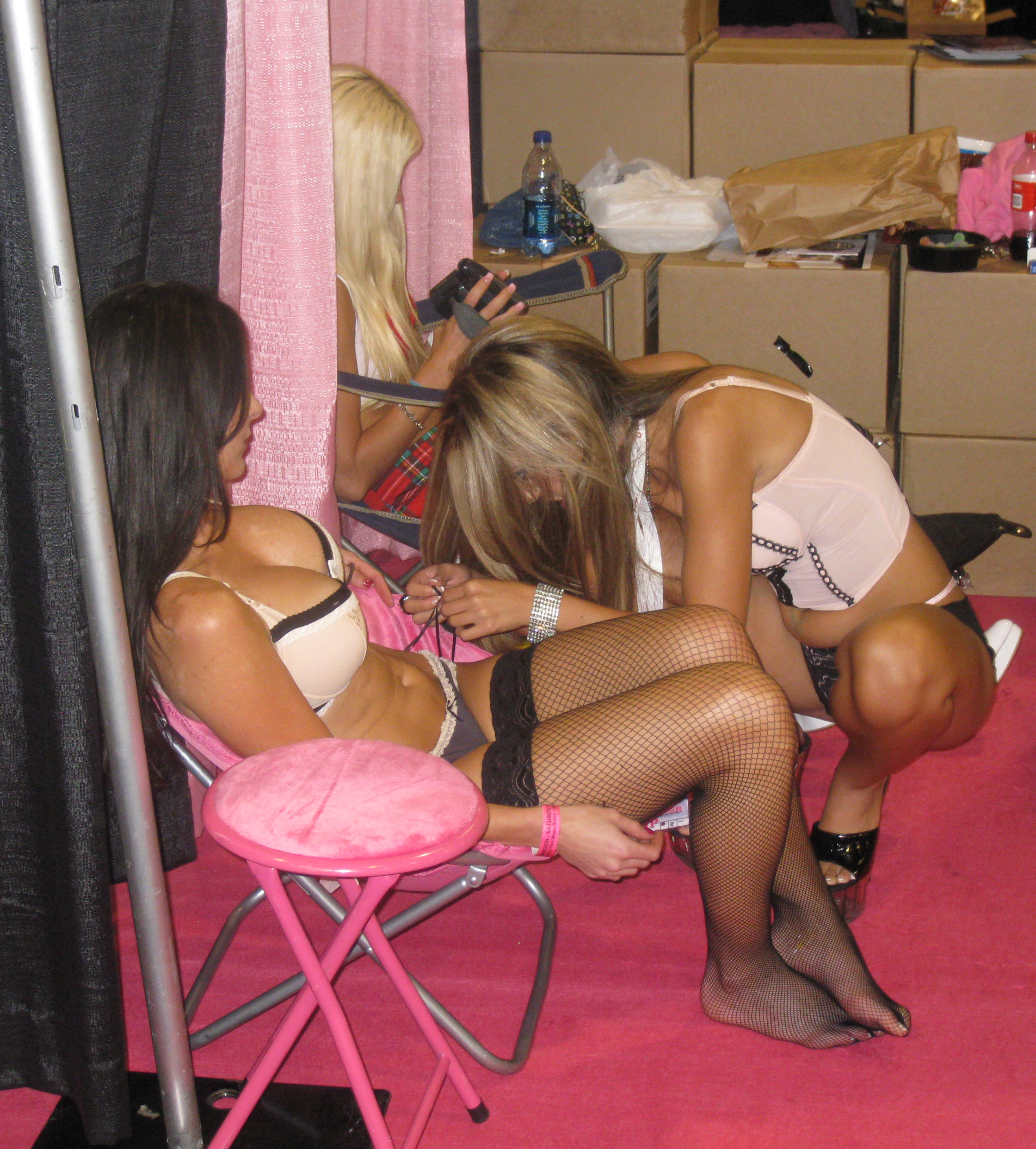
Performers backstage tending to their props away from the audience

Dancers continually interact with the customers in the club. They walk around and solicit drinks and lap dances, usually scanning the club floor to find the most lucrative customer to greet. The dancer qualifies a customer by sizing up their appearance and personal characteristics. Once the dancer identifies a suitable customer, they approach, and attempt to establish a social relationship. Interaction can also be initiated by customers. Clubs generate revenue by cover charges, selling drinks, and other means. Dancers make most of their income from giving lap dances or VIP dances, where regulations allow. Otherwise, customer tips, at the stage, are a dancer's primary form of income. Dancers are entertaining the customers in exchange for money and employing all of the resources at their disposal to do so. They sell the fantasy of sex, but do not typically follow through with the act.

Dancers, in an attempt to acquire a tip or monetary reward, may be selling more than just attractiveness and fantasy. They portray feelings of intimacy and emotional connectedness for their customers, and most of the time, these portrayals are overstated or false. The stage persona is different from who they are backstage, even if it does mirror aspects of their true personality. Within the context of the strip club, dancers might sometimes give the impression that they are revealing private (or backstage) information to customers in order to play a confidence game for increased profit. Dancers use props such as make-up, clothing, costumes, and appealing fragrances to complete their character and maintain their "front" while in the club. Customers rarely, if ever, see the preparation of these props, since they are denied access to the backstage of a dancer's performance space by the layout of the club. A customer often wants a dancer to "drop the act", which makes them feel special and desired. This girlfriend experience can involve increased intimacy up to and including sex acts. Dancers are commonly aware of this customer desire for increased confidence, and may allow the impression that a customer is seeing their true selves. In reality, it is often just part of the act with little to no emotional attachment for the dancer.

==== Cultural norms and policies ====
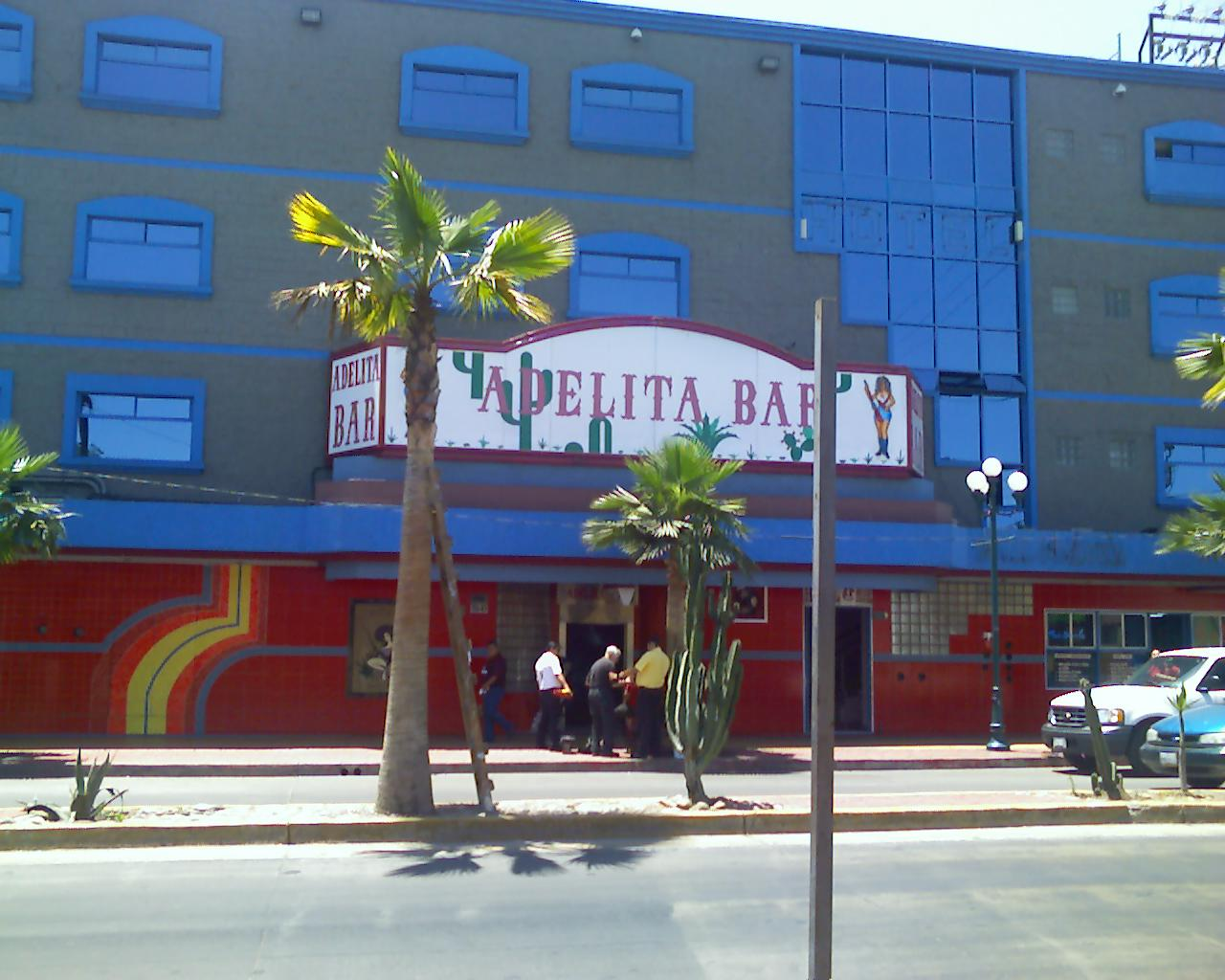
Strip club in Tijuana, Mexico

Rules governing strip clubs and the overall adult entertainment industry vary around the world and formats sometimes are combined under a single roof or complex. In Bangkok, Thailand, the Nana Entertainment Plaza in downtown Bangkok is a large, four-floor compound with over 40 bars. Most of the bars are go-go bars with dancers in various stages of nudity. They are not formal brothels, since customers must negotiate without an intermediary, directly with the dancers, for services up to and including sex. Zürich, Switzerland, has legalized prostitution and its strip clubs throughout the city offer sex among their services. Differing from Zurich brothels, sex services via the strip clubs are typically performed off site. Eastern European strip clubs have a similar model. A 0.34-square-kilometre (0.13 mi^{2}) "sex zone" in Tokyo, Japan, had approximately 3,500 sex facilities in 1999. These included strip theaters, peep shows, "soaplands", "lover's banks", porno shops, telephone clubs, karaoke bars, clubs and more all offering adult entertainment services. In Dubai, a nation governed by very strict cultural norms and laws, there are several Indian strip clubs offering at least partial nudity.

Dancers may tie their state of undress to the number of songs played. This could correspond to a bikini performance for song one and topless for the second. In a fully nude club, the sequence could be topless-to-nude over two songs, or any one of a number of other variations. In the United States, clubs are classified based on typical performances, zoning regulations, and advertised services. Zoning regulations in the U.S. can prove a challenge, with clubs needing to be a certain distance away from schools and other areas where minor children are known to congregate. These restrictions are meant, ostensibly, to curb exposure to activities that could negatively impact social development of children, and to protect nearby real estate properties not tied to the industry from devaluation. These are known as "secondary effects". The validity of secondary effects has been disputed, with the counterargument that clubs have been forced through zoning into "seedy neighborhoods". Elsewhere in North America, the Zona Norte red light district in Tijuana, Mexico, has a number of legal brothels which are modeled on strip clubs and feature U.S.-style striptease performed by its prostitutes.

== Facilities ==
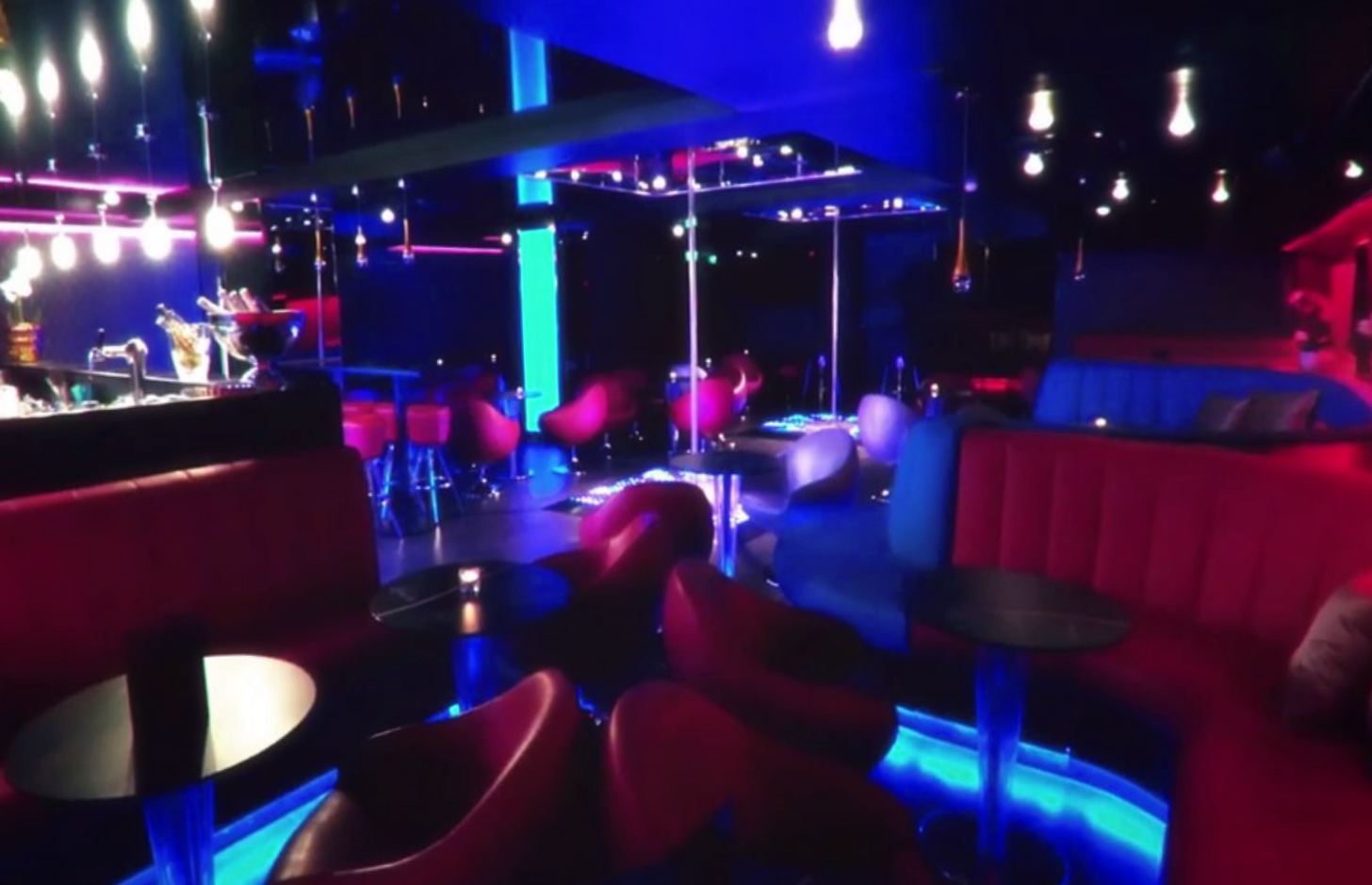
Interior of Gentlemans Club Helsinki in Punavuori, Helsinki, Finland

Many strip clubs are located in buildings that are converted bars, restaurants, or warehouses, or had industrial uses. The original layout of the building will affect the physical layout of a club. The more money that has been invested in a facility, the more it resembles a dedicated club. Regardless of the floorplan, as an interactive theater, there are features every strip club will have. They include: performers (strippers), a floor area where the customers will congregate, and some form of staging for the striptease performance.

Higher-end gentlemen's clubs have features that cost millions of dollars to install and maintain.

=== General admission areas ===
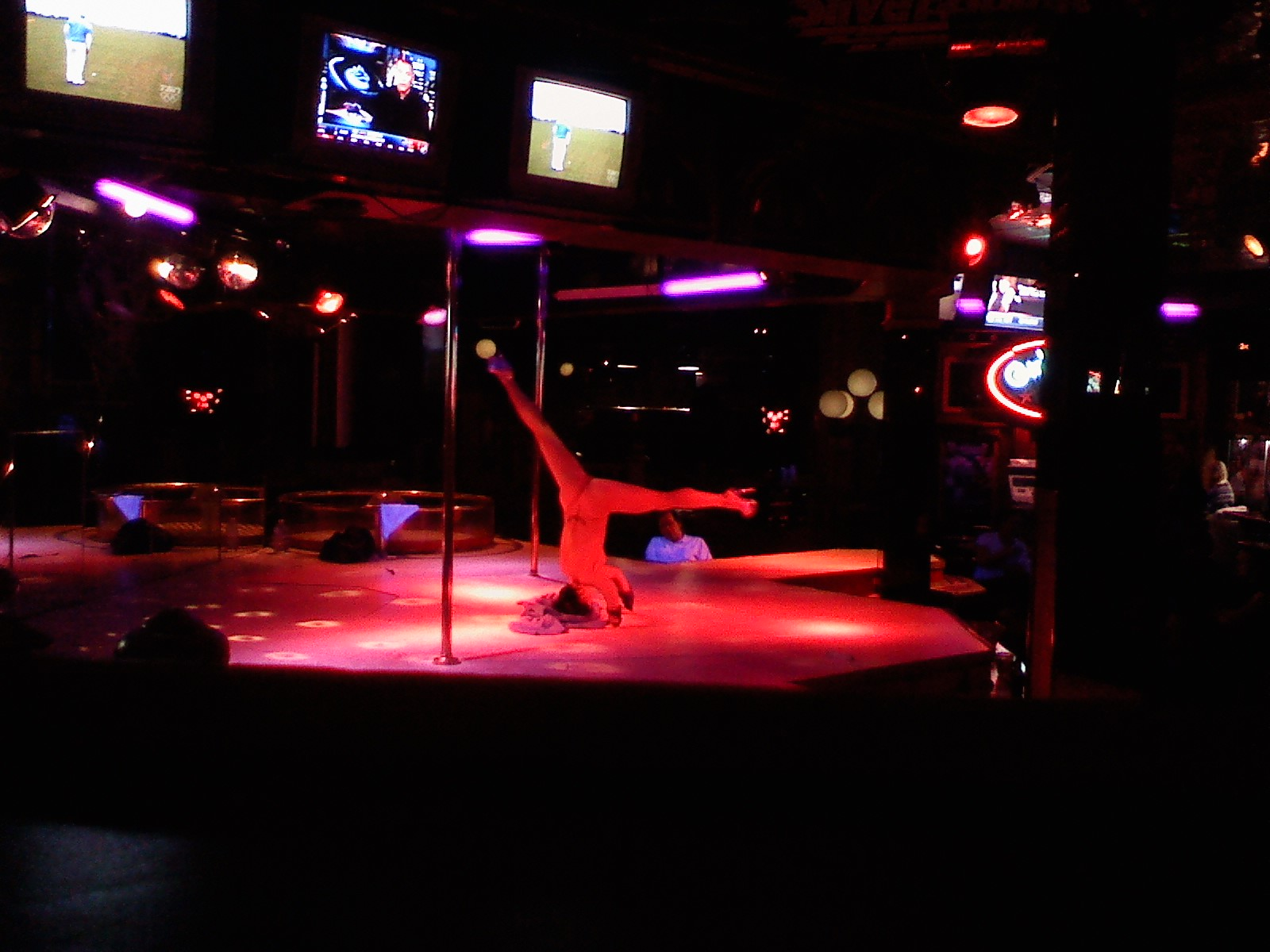
A stripper on the main stage of Monty's Showroom Pub in Victoria, British Columbia, Canada

The floor area is open for general admission. A customer is free to wander around the club, except for employee areas and premium lounges. To access premium lounges (sometimes called VIP, champagne, or other lounges), a customer would normally be charged a fee above the cover charge. In some cases, the employee and premium lounges are dual use. For example, a manager's office might also double as the VIP room.

All clubs are configured differently. A small club can have a single room, with an improvised stage for the striptease show. Many clubs have more than the basic amenities. Larger clubs have clearer designations of areas. The different areas within a club could be separated by a physical step, built-in railing, platforms and levels, doorways, distinct rooms, and entirely separate floors, and they can also be formed by different carpeting, placement of seating, or physical implements such as a rope or other physical marker.

==== Floor and seating ====
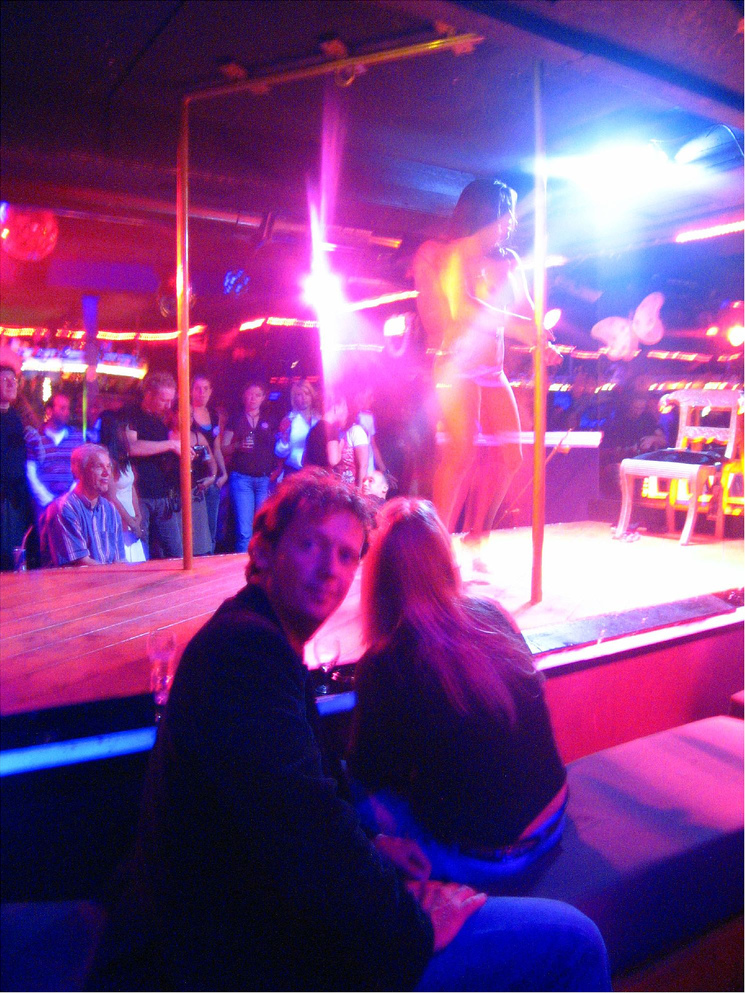
Customers seated by the tip rail at Club Live in Scheveningen, The Hague, Netherlands

Most entertainment takes place in the main floor area, and this is where performers and staff can interact with patrons. Customers get comfortable in this area and from their observations, they decide which club services they will use. The main stage is visible from the main floor, and the main bar is accessible, if one is present. Patrons can usually select from open seating and some clubs will have staff to assist with seating. If premium seating is provided, club staff will usually manage access to those areas. Depending on the day, time and staffing levels, accessibility of the general admission areas may vary. Larger clubs will rope off or otherwise close sections of the club to customers unless the size of the crowd warrants use of the space. Larger clubs could have multiple floor, bar, seating, and staging areas which are managed in a similar manner.

==== Main stage ====
A main stage is where a featured performer will dance as part of a rotation. In most clubs, the main stage is a dominant feature of the layout and the center of activity. A common type of strip club main stage is the thrust stage, also known as a runway stage, but the other major forms are also used regularly. Theatre in the round is also a popular form of strip club staging for the main stage. During each set of one or more songs, the current performer will dance on stage. A dancer collects tips from customers either while on stage or while mingling with the audience after their performance. A customary tip (where customers can do so at the stage) is a dollar bill folded lengthwise and placed in the dancer's garter from the tip rail. The area of the tip rail is equivalent to the apron in traditional theatre. It is referred to in slang as "ringside", "gynecology row", "pervert row", and other names.

Many stages have actual railing built on or around the stage to function as the tip railing, in addition to indicating where customers should position themselves relative to the performance zone. Customers take turns tipping the dancer. They may also line up to tip popular performers. If physical railing is not present, the tip rail is the edge of stage or defined performance area. Other common tip methods are to insert the dollar into the stripper's cleavage from the hand or mouth, to simply place it or toss it on stage, or to crumple bills into a ball shape and throw them in the entertainer's direction. Each club and dancer has different tolerance levels for customer interaction, including tipping. Some clubs have multiple stages on the premises. Tipping etiquette varies between countries and cultures. In Eastern European and Asian clubs, it is customary to agree on payment upfront for a certain amount of time or dances, for stage performances and any private sessions.

==== Optional staging ====
Satellite staging includes one or more areas where a stripper can perform other than a main stage and private dances. Larger clubs can have elaborate staging layouts with multiple stage areas distributed around a club and multiple dancers rotating between them per song. Some strip clubs consider ad hoc performances on satellite stages, paid for by a customer on a per song basis, a form of private dance. Rules at the satellite stages on the main floor tend to be the same as the main stage. In some cases, the layout is significantly different, allowing more or less access to the customer. If a satellite stage is located in a premium access zone, access to the dancer could be considerably greater since the higher level of service can include a less restrictive policy than enforced on the main floor. Lap dance, peep show, and lingerie modeling clubs might only have satellite stages with pay to play entertainment options on their premises.

Novelty acts (such as shower shows, fire shows, and oil wrestling) can be presented on dedicated stages, temporary staging on the floor, or on the main stage itself depending on the club. The main stage, if used, must be prepared and possibly covered to prevent damage, as accidents and injuries have been reported during these types of striptease performances. When dangerous materials such as fire are used as props, a permit may be required to be compliant with local ordinances. Novelty acts are typically performed by feature dancers or by select house dancers during a featured performance. Shower shows require special equipment, so they are more likely to have a dedicated stage in the club with house dancers performing in the show. Optional staging can be present on the main floor or in dedicated rooms throughout larger clubs.

==== Bars and counters ====
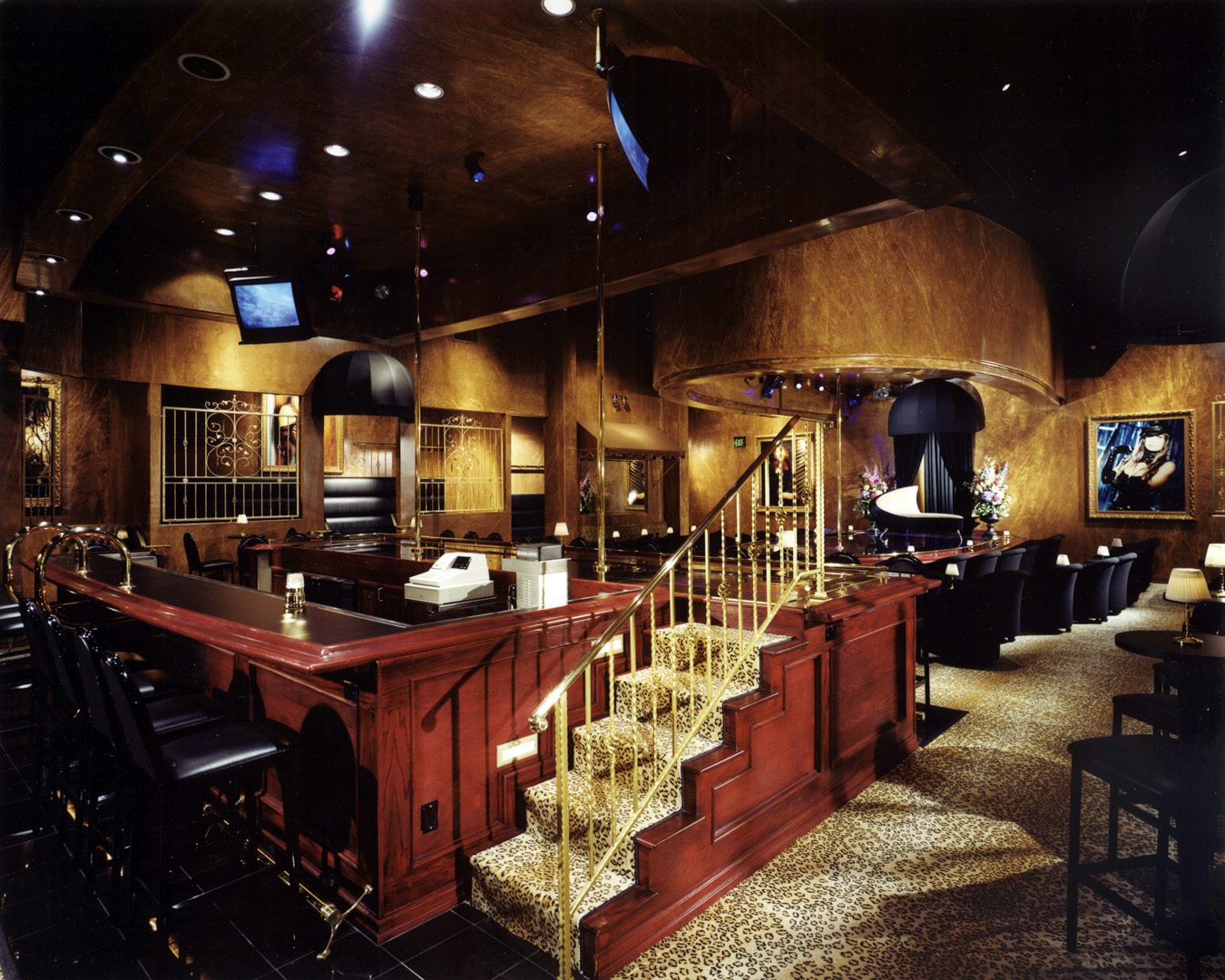
The main bar of Spearmint Rhino Van Nuys in Los Angeles, California, with built-in stage. Main stage in background.

A full bar is the primary service mechanism for clubs that offer alcoholic beverages. In many clubs, the main bar is the second most dominant element on the floor after the main stage, and in some cases, the main (or satellite) stage is built into the bar. Clubs can derive large percentages of their income from drink purchases. For both Rick's Cabaret and VCGH, Inc., service revenues were the single largest revenue source, with sales of alcoholic beverages second. VCGH earned 18% more and RICK 27.5% more in service revenue than alcohol sales. The amounts are closer when food and merchandise sales are considered, with RICK reporting a smaller gap between the two revenue sources relative to VCGH. Upscale clubs that offer food can have free-standing or built-in bars for buffet service. Otherwise, food orders might be taken at the main bar or by waitstaff.

Consumption of alcohol is often facilitated via direct sales in strip clubs where such sales are legal, appropriately zoned, and licensed. Some clubs that are not licensed to serve alcohol will work around the restriction by implementing a bring your own beverage (BYOB) policy and a juice bar. Juice bars have the appointments of full bars but only serve non-alcoholic beverages such as water, fruit juice, and flavored carbonated beverages. Such a bar could double as a service counter for the storage of BYOB material and offer ice and mixing services to create mixed drinks using the customer-purchased ingredients. Where waitstaff are present, they may serve as an extension of the bar service; providing and refreshing drinks while maintaining the cleanliness of the seating areas.

==== Other floor areas ====
Many clubs have a lobby area where the cover charge, if any, is collected by a doorman or doorwoman and security personnel can do a quick check of prospective customers as they enter the facility. Games are also a common feature of strip clubs. Arcade and gambling machines are popular features, as are pool tables. Some clubs also have dedicated areas of the main floor dedicated to performing private dance services.

=== Premium access zones ===
Access to certain parts of a strip club can require payment of an additional fee, or can be by invitation. These areas offer features that are not present in the general admission areas. This approach might allow a club to offer different types and standards of services in the various areas, or to comply with local laws. In this setting, VIPs such as high rollers or persons of a wider popular celebrity may receive complimentary services according to their reputation with the club personnel.

VIP seating adjacent to the main floor is often more comfortable. For example, these areas may include arm chairs, couches, or booths with service tables. The area typically has a clear line of sight to the main stage. Reserve seating gives a customer a sense of importance and demonstrates prestige. In higher-end clubs, VIP seating might include balconies and other overlooks, which might also include smaller stages for a private dance if the customer wishes, at an additional fee. VIP seating can also act as lap dance booths, where a higher lap dance price would apply than in the general area.

VIP rooms are partitioned areas in a club that are typically enclosed by fixed walls and can have doors that close completely. For such rooms that do not offer solid doors, there is usually some type of system to screen the room from view with stringed beads, curtains, or other devices. Couch rooms, private dance rooms, and lounges are also forms of VIP zones. VIP rooms have seating that is more plush than the general admission zones and the VIP seating adjacent to the main floor. Often, purchase of access to the room includes customer time with the dancer(s) of their choice. Some rooms are outfitted with props and appliances, such as showers, hot tubs, and various types of bedding.

A champagne room (also called a champagne lounge, or champagne court) is a specialized VIP room service offered by gentlemen's clubs where a customer can purchase time (usually in half-hour increments) with an exotic dancer in a private room on the premises. Depending on the quality of the club, these rooms, which are typically away from the hustle and bustle of the main club, are generally well decorated and usually appointed with a private bar. Clubs sell champagne by the glass or by the bottle for both the dancer and the customer. Some clubs also offer food or cigar service.

=== Limited access zones ===
Portions of the club used only for the operation and maintenance typically have access restricted to staff and performers. These include (but are not limited to) management offices, employee booths, performer dressing rooms, and service areas, such as the kitchen and behind the bar. This business practice does not differ significantly from what is seen in other customer service businesses such as retail stores and restaurants. More frequently seen are entry booths, where security staff monitor customers entering and leaving the club and collect the cover charge, and the DJ booth, where the DJ operates. The DJ booth contains sound, lighting, and other equipment which is used to "orchestrate the crowd" by adjusting the club environment, and is equivalent to a control room in a traditional theater.

Dancers use dressing rooms to prepare for performances, rest between performances, and stow any of their belongings not secured by other means. It is customary for disputes between club personnel to be handled off the floor and out of sight of patrons. Dressing rooms are commonly used for performer-only mediation, though this could shift into other areas of discussion if management is involved. Clubs are experimenting with granting greater access to restricted areas via technology. The service includes a live view into part of the backstage dressing room and paid access enables the website user to interact live with dancers at the club. Security of club assets and personnel are a primary driver for limiting access to these zones. If surveillance equipment for the club and grounds is present on site, the monitoring locations for the audio/video feeds will be directed to management. In less frequent cases, such feeds could also be accessed from off-site.

== Performers and staff ==
=== Performers ===
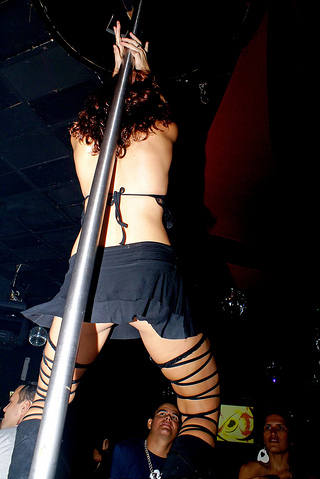
Stripper performing on stage at Cabaret Kalesa in Rio de Janeiro, Brazil

Performers are called strippers, exotic dancers, just dancers, or entertainers. Strippers are the primary draw for any club. Dancers effectively entertaining customers are the key to generating revenue by keeping customers on site and enticing them to be repeat visitors. The image of strippers (as known today) evolved through the late 1960s and 1970s in the U.S. and international cultures that embraced Americanized striptease; introduced into popular culture by the genre-defining performances of Carol Doda. By the 1980s, the pole dancing and highly explicit imagery associated with today's performers was widely accepted and frequently portrayed in film, television, and theater. House dancers work for a particular club or franchise. Feature dancers tend to have their own celebrity, touring a club circuit and making appearances. Porn stars will often become feature dancers to earn extra income and build their fan base. High-profile adult film performers Jenna Haze and Teagan Presley, among others, have participated in feature shows through the U.S., as did now-retired stars such as Jenna Jameson.

==== Work environments ====
In some localities, strippers are required to obtain permits to work in adult entertainment. During a bikini performance, both breasts and genital areas typically remain covered by revealing attire, while dancers provide services and entertainment. Go-go dancers will retain their tops and bottoms for the duration of their performance. A female stripper whose upper body is exposed, but whose genital areas remain obscured during a performance, is said to be topless. Strippers who uncover the genital areas along with other clothing during a performance are said to be dancing fully nude. The fully nude practice is banned in many jurisdictions, but many dancers work around these constraints by selective uncovering of the vulva, anus, or both, for short periods of time, followed by immediate replacement of the clothing. Not all strippers are comfortable dancing topless or fully nude.

Strippers can sometimes be contracted for performances outside the strip club environment. Strippers with ready access to the Internet away from work have also adopted social media and networks as a less intrusive way of maintaining direct connections with customers. Others use the internet to generate revenue by performing via webcam, recording premium content, or running their own subscriber-based web site. Online erotic content is pervasive and generally classified as pornography. Much like activities inside the club, different dancers have different comfort levels for services they provide during private parties. Aside from advertising for striptease services outside the club, an unknown percentage of strippers also work in other aspects of the sex industry. This can include erotic and nude modeling, pornography, escorting, and in some cases prostitution. Outside the U.S., the use of strip clubs to facilitate sex-for-hire is much more common and stripping in those settings is viewed as advertising for sexually oriented business that will be performed in either private areas of the club or off-premises.

==== Social interaction ====
Research suggests that exotic dancing can pay well, but often at significant cost to the stripper. One reason for this is the negative stigma associated with exotic dancing. Not all dancers are affected equally. Some dancers manage this stigma by dividing "the social world" and only revealing part of their identity. By revealing only a part of themselves, strippers may avoid being characterized by the stigmatizing attributes associated with exotic dancing. Outside the club, dancers are indistinguishable by appearance from the general population and no more likely to be the targets of acts like violent crime than are other women. Inside the club, personal boundaries are frequently crossed between strippers, customers, and other club staff. Research indicates that at some point every dancer has felt exploited by customers, management, or other dancers. The most common complaint from dancers is being portrayed as an object or instrument, rather than as a person. While dancers feel this exploitation and are affected by it, they also admit that they exploit their customers.

=== Primary staff ===
Additional club staff almost always includes a club manager, as dancer-run clubs are rare. One or more managers are responsible for day-to-day operations on behalf of the club owner. Managerial responsibilities include money handling, inventory, and hiring and firing of employee staff and contractors. The manager role can be split between a general manager and one or more floor managers. If a bar is present, one or more dedicated bartenders might be employed to assist customers by preparing their drinks or by storing drinks that customers bring into BYOB clubs. In some localities, bartenders are required to have an individual permit to serve alcohol. House moms monitor dancers on behalf of the management. A house mom can be particularly beneficial where staff is otherwise male, given her potential to relate to female dancers in a way that male members of staff may not be able to. Not every club will have a house mom.

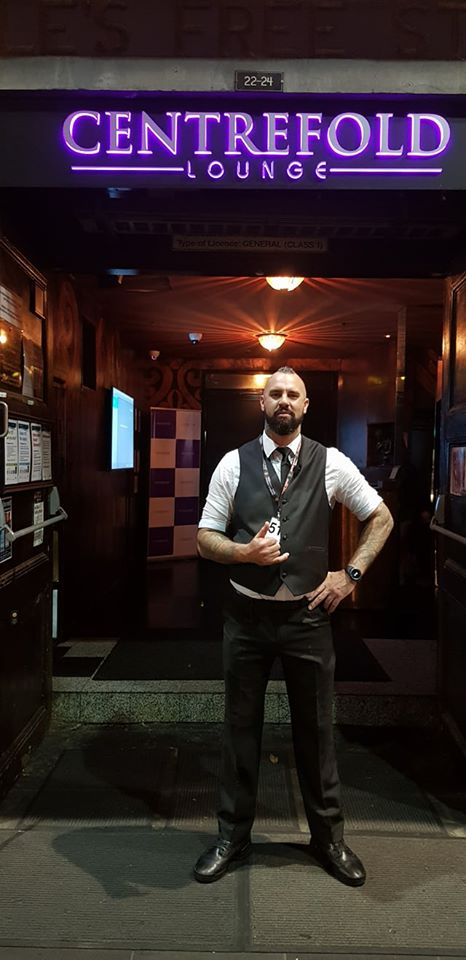
A bouncer in front of Centrefolds Lounge Gentlemen's Club on King Street, Melbourne, Australia

Bouncers are security personnel. They are typically relatively large and physically strong males, who enforce club policy and maintain order in and around the premises. In some cases, on-duty law enforcement may be on site if a club is viewed by authorities as a location with a high enough crime risk. More commonly, privately hired security (including off-duty police) are contracted to guard the premises. Bouncers can also double as doormen or disc jockeys (DJs); serving as hosts and maintaining the flow of entertainment and even cuing music for the dance sets. Where a DJ is not present, music may be provided via either a jukebox or sometimes live musicians.

=== Ancillary staff ===
Strip clubs have a variety of configurations and staffing needs. Some clubs employ a host to emcee the show, in addition to a DJ. Hosts are more common in busier clubs or shifts, and during special, such as amateur night and featured acts. If the club charges a fee for entry, specialized personnel may work the door to collect the cover. A common practice is to employ young women, which are known in the industry as door girls, for this function. In certain areas, doormen working outside the strip club will act as "hype men" enticing people to enter and sample the show and services. The Block in Baltimore, Maryland, has aggressive doormen stationed at nearly every entrance, only feet apart in a highly concentrated area of clubs. Broadway in San Francisco, California, has fewer clubs clustered together, but practices similar activities with their doormen.

Waitstaff are also employed to assist with providing drinks, and in some cases meals, to customers on the main floor and others areas of the club. Shooter girls are specialized waitstaff that carry pre-prepared drinks in shot glasses, that customers can conveniently purchase. Depending on the local ordinances, these shots may involve some erotic part of the body of the shooter girl, typically her cleavage, in the delivery. If a club has a policy of setting a drink minimum per visit or per hour, the floor staff also assists in enforcing those rules. Dancers may also be required to generate a certain number of drink purchases per shift and as part of their rounds, the waitstaff may ask customers if they would like to buy a drink for the dancer seated with them. If a kitchen is present and if premium fare is offered, the club may also employ a chef to prepare and cook food items.

Parking lot attendants can include people who simply coordinate where to park and how much to pay or they may also include formal valets, who will park a vehicle and keep track of the driver's keys while he or she is in the club. Some clubs require paid or valet parking to be used if keeping cars on the premises, to generate revenue and help regulate patron behavior. Bathroom attendants monitor the restrooms on behalf of management; primarily watching for policy violations and potential liability concerns. In strip clubs, policy enforcement can range from watching for drug use, sex, fighting, and other activities the club would prefer to see done off the premises. The attendant will also attempt to keep the restroom area clean, assist with the washing of hands, and if available, provide by request an assortment of cologne, mints, and other disposable items.

== Business and operations ==
As a global industry, strip clubs are booming. As of 2009, there were between 3,500 and 4,000 strip clubs in the United States alone. More money is spent in the U.S. in strip clubs than is spent on theater, opera, ballet, jazz and classical music concerts combined. Some clubs have hundreds of entertainers appear on stage within a single year.

=== Global industry ===
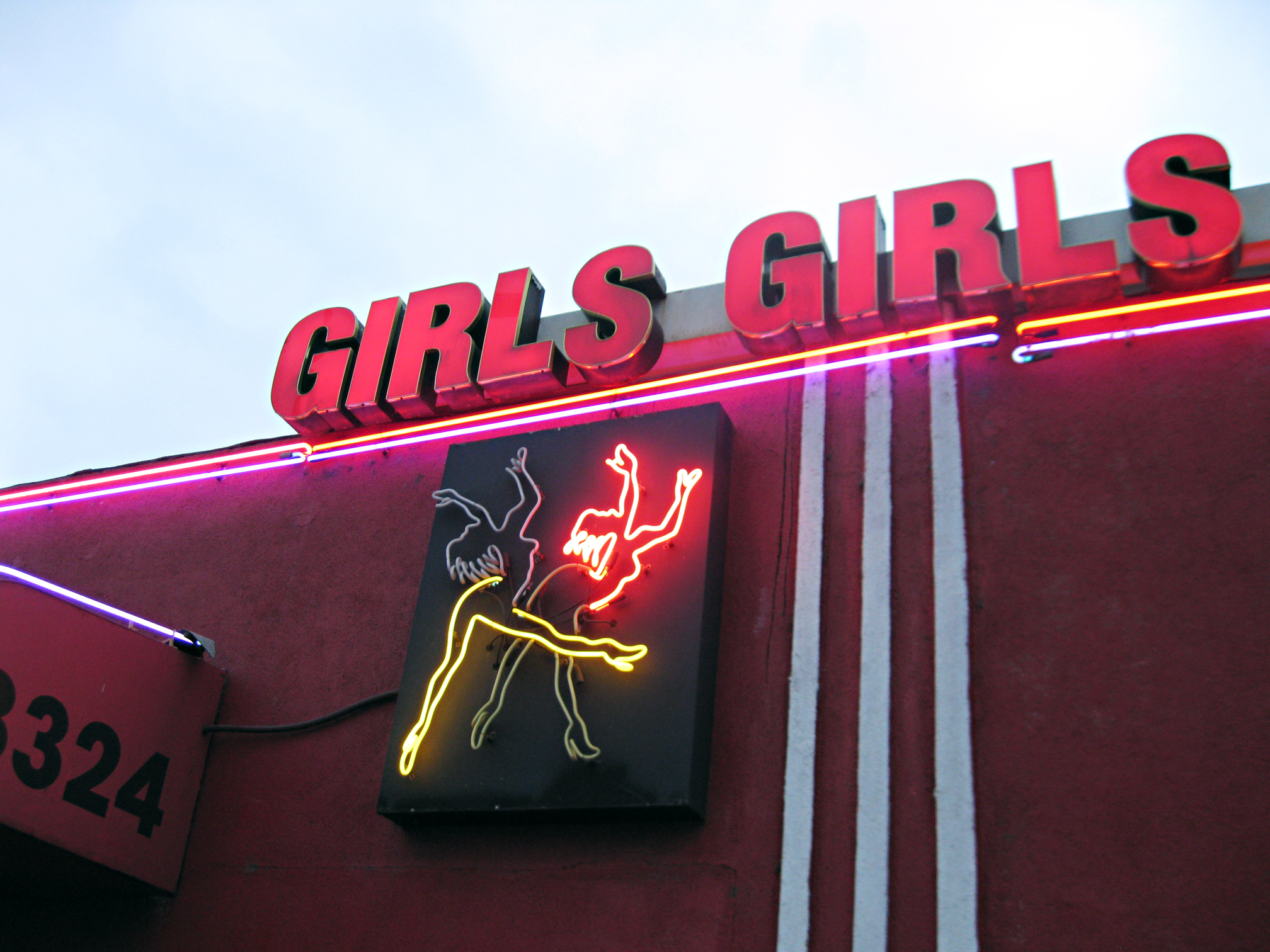
Neon "Girls Girls Girls" sign on the front of club Burlesque with nude dancers in outline (North Hollywood, Los Angeles, California, U.S.)

The U.S. and international markets for clubs offering Americanized striptease are not well defined and published revenue figures are estimates. In 2002, the size of the U.S. industry was estimated to be US$3.1 billion, spanning 2,500 clubs and generating 19% of the total gross in legal adult entertainment revenue. The U.S. market for strip clubs was estimated to be as large as US$15 billion in 2005. That same year, the U.S. state of California alone accounted for US$1 billion in revenue, and the total size of the global strip club industry was estimated to be US$75 billion. Also, in 2005, an estimated 300,000 women worked as strippers in the U.S., across 3,000 clubs. An industry insider in 2008 estimated the U.S. strip club market at close to US$2 billion, basing that estimate on Adult Video News Media Network (AVN) statistics and highlighting both the methodological variances of different studies and the difficulties of providing reliable statistics on the industry. Since then, the number of clubs in the U.S. has grown to approximately 4,000 by 2010.

In Britain, the number of strip clubs rose over 1,000% between 1997 and 2010. In 2008 alone, a strip club opened there almost every week. One factor in the proliferation of British strip clubs is Britain's 2003 Licensing Act, which introduced the one-size-fits-all premises licence, which meant that strip clubs in Britain no longer had to receive special permission for nudity. In 2005, revenues for the UK strip club industry, one of the fastest growing sectors of its leisure industry, were estimated to be £300 million. Revenues for 2006 in Scotland alone accounted for £20 million of the UK total.

==== Markets and ownership ====
American-style striptease, closely associated with contemporary clubs around the world, began to appear outside North America in the post-World War II era, emerging in Asian performances during the late 1940s and in European theaters by 1950. A contemporary example, the American Spearmint Rhino chain, has clubs located in the UK, Russia, and Australia, as well as the United States. In 2003, the company's London location reportedly made £3 per minute. Strip clubs offering American striptease and other adult entertainment services have been established on six of seven continents (all except Antarctica), and the demand for these types of business is soaring in economically developing nations. Most adult entertainment companies, which include strip clubs, are in privately held ownership.

Two strip club companies are publicly traded in U.S. financial markets and listed on NASDAQ: VCG Holding Corp. (VCGH) and RCI Hospitality Holdings, Inc. (RICK). In February 2010, the two clubs agreed in principle to merge, with Rick's Cabaret acquiring VCG Holding. The estimated purchase price, according to the statement of intent, was for the acquisition using RICK stock to be at a value of US$2.20 to US$3.80 per share. The US$45 million deal fell through after the statement of intent expired on March 31, 2010, with Rick's Cabaret unable to enter into a definitive merger agreement to acquire all of VCG's outstanding stock. A third publicly traded company, Scores Holding Company, Inc. (SCRH), licenses its brand to strip club operators but does not own or operate any club properties itself. Publicly reported earning statements for U.S. companies operating strip clubs have not provided guidance on how they define their market segment, non-public competitors, or overall industry revenue.

The largest operator of strip clubs internationally is Déjà Vu, which has over 130 locations worldwide.

==== Financial trends ====
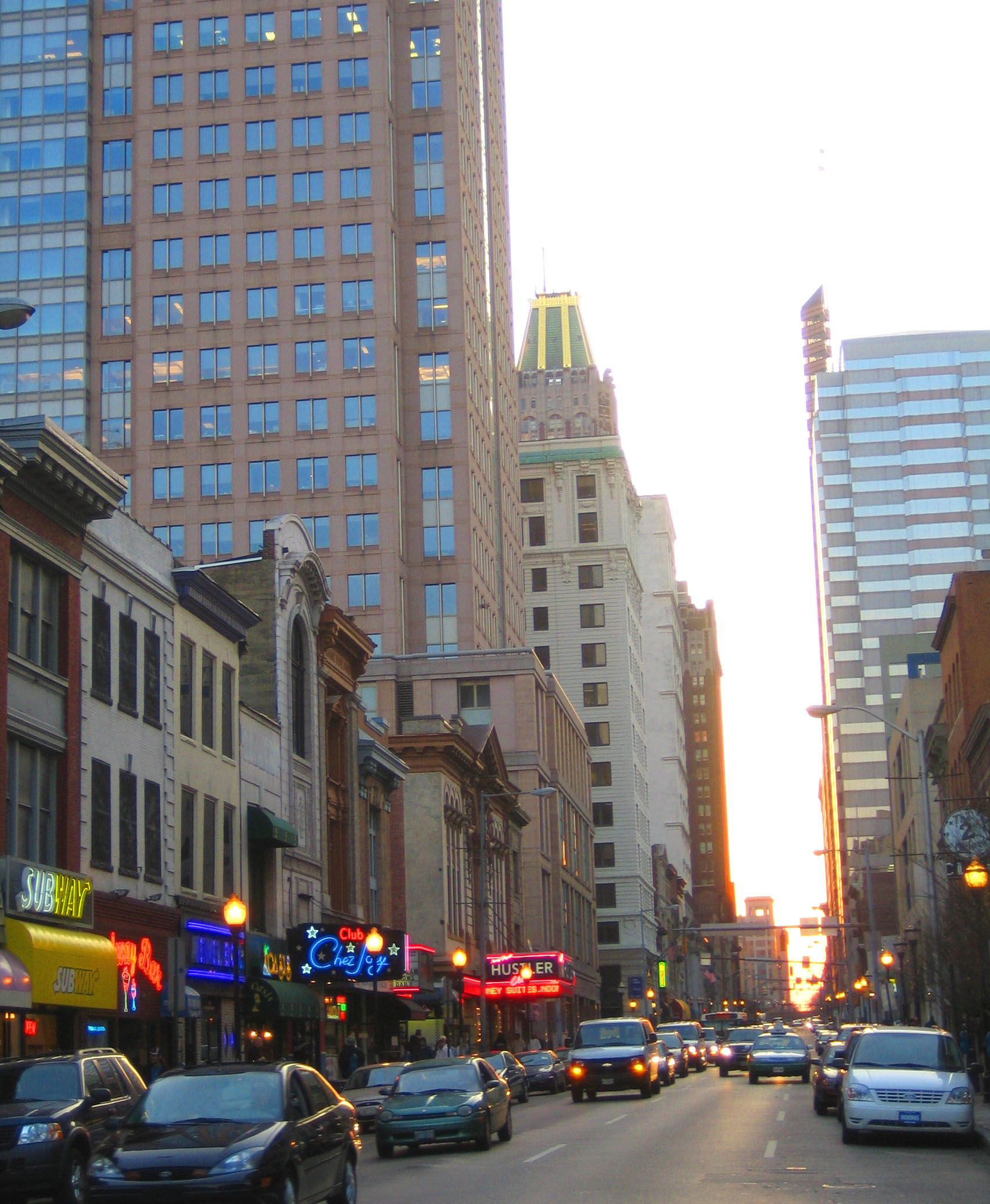
Street view of strip clubs on The Block in Baltimore, Maryland, U.S.

The rapid expansion of the strip club industry observed in the 2000s occurred primarily in the Western world. Far from its heyday in the 1980s and 1990s, Japan's sex industry has been in a protracted slump in the first decade of the 21st century, as the overall economy experienced a recession. Its hostess and strip bars (those which had not closed outright) felt the impact of dwindling corporate spending accounts, leading to increased competition (and reduced boundaries) for remaining patrons. Profitability of strip clubs, as with other service-oriented businesses, is largely driven by location and customer spending habits. Clubs closely proximate to Wall Street in New York, New York are notorious for hosting meetings with financial industry power brokers, among other business heavyweights, which are frequently expensed on company bankrolls. Since clubs located in urban areas or business centers have caused concerns over traffic and social issues, some club owners with common interests in close proximity have shared representation without consolidating their businesses. After numerous incidents during the 1990s with local and state government, Downtown Entertainment Inc. was formed in 2000 to represent the interests of business owners on The Block in Baltimore, Maryland.

Strip clubs which practice Generally Accepted Accounting Principles (GAAP) typically report negative working capital, where current liabilities exceed current assets. Clubs receive immediate cash payment for sales, while inventories, accrued expenses, and other current liabilities normally carry longer payment terms. The practice is believed to increase net cash provided by operating activities. Service revenues include entertainer payments to perform at clubs, customer admission fees, customer payments for tabs and tip charges, dance dollar payments, and suite rental fees. The economic downturn, which accelerated in 2008, impacted clubs at all levels, and even higher-end gentlemen's clubs in some parts of the U.S. and elsewhere adjusted their business practices to compensate for reduced revenues.

=== Business practices ===
Strip clubs can operate at all hours, depending on regulations and revenue. It is a common business practice to have a reduced door charge or no entry fee at all during daytime. Clubs that are open for more than just the nighttime hours may incorporate a staggered or shift work schedule for their entertainers and staff. External factors, such as location and public perception, have some impact on business, but the essential draw of the strip club is the live entertainment. Because of negative perceptions of the adult entertainment industry, many clubs engage in public displays of charity to generate goodwill. VCGH clubs, in order to be good corporate citizens, actively sponsor and participate in local charitable events and contribute to local charities. Some clubs also register their business entities using benign names, so that they appear to be businesses unrelated to the sex industry on receipts and financial statements, and as a means of discretion. Cameras (including camera phones) and other recording devices are often banned from strip clubs to "protect the identity of the women working there and to spare the blushes of men caught on film attending the club".

Among clubs, there is a variety of different ways to deliver entertainment, and fee structures commonly differ between clubs. A cover charge (entry fee also known as a door charge) is customary at many clubs, the amount of which can vary by factors such as day of visit, time of day, gender, and other factors. To make the charge more acceptable to customers, some clubs include bonus items in the admission price, such as drink tickets that can be redeemed once inside. Some clubs also have drink fees tied to interaction with performers. The bigger the drink, the longer the time permitted with the dancer. This practice is more common in European strip clubs and African or Asian hostess clubs. Champagne Room pricing (where time with an exotic dancer in a private room on the premises can be purchased) is a variation on that same theme.

==== Operations ====
In the U.S., striptease dancers are generally classified as independent contractors. A few smaller strip clubs may pay a weekly wage but, in most cases, a dancer's income is derived entirely from tips and other fees, which they collect from customers. In most clubs, dancers must pay a "stage fee" or "house fee" to work a given shift. In these cases, strippers receive payment in the form of tips and payment for specific services offered by the club (such as lap dances). Many clubs also take a percentage of fees charged for each private dance. It is also customary – and often required in the United States – for dancers to pay a "tip out", usually at the end of their shift, to the supporting staff, such as DJs, house moms, make-up artists, servers, bartenders, and bouncers. This can be a set fee or a percentage of money earned. For the customer, the fee structure of a club is determined by management policy.

In many smaller clubs, multiple staff roles are filled by the same person, such as a bartender and manager. In extreme cases, one person fills all the support functions within a club. Some clubs hire attractive women onto the staff, as bartenders and shot girls, to complement the strippers. They can also double as stage and lap dance entertainers, depending on the club. The positions of paid staff are discretionary. Turnover can be frequent, but standard employment laws do apply and have been enforced through the courts and other regulatory means. A highly publicized 2010 case in the United States concerned a pregnant bartender in New York. She alleged that Cafe Royale in Farmingdale, New York, discriminated against her because pregnancy is "unsexy". Hiring of staff and performers in the United States is almost always voluntary on the part of the club and worker. Some strip clubs have hosted job fairs to address staffing needs. While not a common practice in the United States, globally, women are regularly compelled into working as strippers with the knowledge of club management.

==== Marketing ====
The ability to attract first-time patrons is critical to a nightclub's success. As such, promotions, advertising, and special offers are the typical means to market a nightclub. Marketing strategies for strip clubs include attracting new customers, increasing the frequency of visits by existing customers, and establishing a higher level of name recognition. Target markets can include the business-convention traveler, local professionals, and business people. College students are also a secondary target market. Advertising is essential for strip clubs, but local regulations and public reaction can make it challenging. For this reason, clubs around the world advertise on the internet. Advertising can include discount passes, virtual club tours, and dancer schedules.

U.S. company VCGH, Inc. uses a variety of highly targeted methods to reach its customers, including local radio, billboard trucks, Internet, newspaper and magazine advertisements, and professional sporting events. Its advertising and marketing expenses decreased by approximately 3.9% to US$2,805,260 from US$2,921,327 over the year ended December 31, 2008. Advertising and marketing expenses were approximately 5.1% of their total revenues in 2009 and 2008. The decrease was attributed to a shift in advertising, including using billboard trucks for mobile advertising versus leasing fixed billboard signs. By contrast, in public filings with the U.S. Securities and Exchange Commission (SEC), Rick's Cabaret International reported an increase in its advertising budget from US$2,231,005 in 2008 to US$8,091,745 in 2009, growing from 3.9% to 10.8% of total annual revenue.

In the city of Seattle, Washington, the city's Major League Baseball franchise, the Seattle Mariners, initially sued in King County Superior Court to prevent Dreamgirls cabaret from opening. The team's attorneys argued that the strip club's existence would adversely affect families that visit the stadium. The suit was dropped after the Mariners reached a compromise which included limits on outdoor advertising, window displays, and signs. The compromise specified that the clubs video screens would only show text on kids days at the stadium, and not images of strippers. In May 2010, there was public controversy because the club showed strippers on its large electronic display on "kids' day". Dreamgirls claimed that it is the team's responsibility to tell them when such a display is prohibited.

Elite Cabaret, a Tempe city strip club, filed suit in 2007 against the City of Tempe in federal court. In the settlement that was reached, the two sides ended the legal wrangle amidst a host of stipulations. One clause is aimed at preventing the racy image promoted by strip clubs. The club is not allowed to depict the human body on the exterior of its building. Signs cannot say "nude", "topless", "girls" or similar words. The sign can only have the bar's name and terms like "cabaret" or "gentlemen's club". Strip club advertising and its associated controversy are not limited to the United States. In South Africa, well-known strip club chain Teazers generated media coverage and official complaints to the Advertising Standards Authority of South Africa (ASA) over its suggestive billboards.

== Law and politics ==
The legal status of strip clubs has evolved over the course of time, with national and local laws becoming progressively more liberal on the issue around the world, although some countries (such as Iceland) have implemented strict limits and bans. Strip clubs are frequent targets of litigation around the world, and the sex industry, which includes strip clubs, is a hot button issue in popular culture and politics. Some clubs have been linked to organized crime, which has been known to use legitimate business as fronts for its illegal operations.

=== Americas ===
With the legal system of the U.S. based on common law, motivations for lawsuits can range from legitimate legal grounds to cases filed with the intent of shaping case law to favor the socio-political aims of special interest groups. Clubs around the country have personnel and clientele that are purported to engage in not only sex acts on the premises, but also drug use and other criminalized activities. Incidents of such activity vary widely. Their prevalence is dependent on regional differences in the attitudes of management, entertainers, customers, and law enforcement. Strip clubs are obligated to enforce age limits for entry to the clubs and consumption of alcohol. If a club is found to have served alcohol to a person under the age of 21 in the U.S., it can have its liquor license suspended or rescinded for repeated violations. Licenses can also be lost due to evidence of drug use in the club. Club owners have closed their businesses as a result of losing a liquor license.

A widely cited U.S. local ordinance is San Diego (California) Municipal Code 33.3610, specific and strict in response to allegations of corruption among local officials, which included contacts in the nude entertainment industry. Among its provisions is the "six-foot rule", copied by other municipalities in requiring that dancers maintain a six-foot distance from patrons while performing. Fully nude clubs may be subject to additional requirements, such as restrictions on alcohol sales and no-touch rules between customers and dancers. To circumvent these rules, two "separate" bars – one topless and one fully nude – may open adjacent to one another. In a small number of states and jurisdictions where it is legal for alcohol to be consumed but not sold, some clubs still allow customers to bring their own beverages.

Still, other rules forbid "full nudity" in certain districts, which can vary among different areas within the same town. Some parts of the U.S. have laws forbidding the exposure of female nipples or even areolas, thus requiring female dancers to cover these with pasties. These laws are not, however, known to be applied to the exposure of male nipples. Managers, dancers, and other club workers can be cited or arrested by local or federal authorities for violating nudity, drug, and other violations. In February 2010, the city of Detroit, Michigan, banned fully exposed breasts in its strip clubs, following the example of Houston, Texas, which began enforcing a similar ordinance in 2008. The Detroit city council has since softened the rules; eliminating the requirement for pasties but keeping other restrictions. Both municipalities were reputed to have suffered rampant occurrences of illicit activities, including prostitution, all linked to striptease establishments within their cities' limits. Detroit has also drawn attention from the federal government for incidents of human trafficking in its strip clubs. In 2010, the state of Missouri passed a law similar to that of Houston and Detroit, banning full nudity in strip clubs across the state.

Strip clubs have also received attention in the Americas outside the United States. There have been several attempts to amend the Canadian Immigration and Refugee Protection Act (IRPA), passed in 2001. The 2009 version of the bill (Bill C-45: An Act to amend the Immigration and Refugee Protection Act) contained provisions intended to tighten the issuing of visas to exotic dancers, to combat human trafficking. In August 2009, the city of Rio de Janeiro, while bidding for the 2014 World Cup, shut down one of its most notorious clubs, the Help discothèque. There were plans to bulldoze the club and "replace it with a music-themed museum" with US firm Diller Scofidio + Renfro as architects, backed by Rio's governor Sérgio Cabral Filho who was also backing the 2016 Summer Olympics bid. In November 2009, officials in Rio de Janeiro threatened to sue American comedian Robin Williams for disparaging comments made on a late-night talk show. One of his comments on its Olympics bid, "Rio sent 50 strippers and a pound of blow. It wasn't really fair, you know?" was replayed several times on news shows in Brazil and prompted a public response from its mayor. The Olympic Committee for Rio had its lawyers investigate whether there were grounds for a lawsuit, but no charges were filed.

=== United Kingdom ===
In 2009, the United Kingdom passed the Policing and Crime Act following concerns about an increase in the number of strip clubs in the country. Any strip clubs where live entertainment takes place more than 11 times a year must apply for a sexual entertainment venue licence from their local authorities. Such clubs are routinely opposed by those who feel that these 'lower the tone' of particular neighbourhoods. The legislation caused a reduction in the number of relevant premises, from about 350 in the early 2000s to fewer than 200, across the UK. In 2014, the East London Strippers Collective was formed to improve working conditions in strip clubs. Their concerns included poorly maintained working environments, exploitative business practises including the levying of fees, commission and fines, and a lack of employment protection and job security.

=== Rest of Europe ===
The Irish government had, at one time, special visa categories for 'entertainers,' which enabled the trafficking of women for strip clubs and prostitution.

In 2001, the former immigration chief in Cyprus was found guilty of accepting bribes to issue work permits to foreign women (in this case from Ukraine), to work as strippers in clubs, with some forced into prostitution. Throughout the United States, the United Kingdom, France, Germany, Italy, Canada, and the Netherlands, studies have shown that Russian individuals and organized crime groups are importing women from Russia, Ukraine, the Baltic States, and Central Europe into the Russian sex industry to work in stripping, prostitution, peep and show club services, and massage and escort services, among others.

In March 2010, Iceland outlawed striptease. Jóhanna Sigurðardóttir, Iceland's prime minister, said: "The Nordic countries are leading the way on women's equality, recognizing women as equal citizens rather than commodities for sale." The politician behind the bill, Kolbrún Halldórsdóttir, said: "It is not acceptable that women or people in general are a product to be sold."

=== Rest of the world ===
Outside the United States, strip clubs are often differently regulated. Activities which are not legal in most parts of the United States or its territories may be permitted in other parts of the world. Also, ties to criminal elements (as defined by international law) can be much more pronounced.

In Eastern Europe and Asia, common incidents of strip club crime involve customers being quoted a price upon entering a club, only to find out later that management expects a much higher payment before customers are permitted to leave. Intimidation and possibly the threat of violence are used to compel customers to comply.

The Japanese government, similar to Canada and Ireland, had special visa categories for "entertainers". These enabled the trafficking of women for strip clubs and prostitution.

In South Africa, there has been public controversy over incidents of prostitution and violence related to its strip clubs. In June 2010, 17 customers were arrested, during a raid at a strip club in Cape Town, for committing unspecified illegal acts. 35 Eastern European dancers were also arrested for working at the club without the correct documents.

In 2008, the NSW Bureau of Crime Statistics and Research in Sydney, Australia, reported 1,600 people were charged with committing a range of 27 criminal offenses in the state's places of worship. The figures showed only 282 people were charged with the same offenses in premises classified as adult entertainment establishments. A breakdown of the statistical figures showed that 85 people were assaulted in places of worship, compared to 66 at adult entertainment locations. Incidents of both sexual assault and harassing and threatening behavior were also greater at places of worship. The report included churches, synagogues, monasteries, mosques, convents, cathedrals and chapels as places of worship. Premises listed as adult entertainment sites included strip clubs, sex shops, brothels, massage parlors, gay clubs, gaming houses, and gambling clubs. The bureau's interpretation was that people were just as likely to be assaulted or robbed in the sanctity of a church as they were in sex industry venues.

== Cultural impact ==
The strip club as an outlet for salacious entertainment is a recurrent theme in popular culture. In the media, clubs are portrayed primarily as gathering places of vice and ill repute. Both clubs themselves and various features of the business are highlighted in these references. Comedian Chris Rock also pokes fun at the champagne room in his spoken word track, "No Sex (In the Champagne Room)", on his 1999 album, Bigger & Blacker. Wyclef Jean later noted Rock's comment in his own reflection on strippers, "Perfect Gentleman". In 2016, rapper Shawty Lo's funeral procession stopped at his favorite strip club, The Blue Flame Lounge in Atlanta, where patrons and mourners honored his casket with a moment of silence.

=== Film, television, and theater ===
The image of strippers as known today evolved through the late 1960s and 1970s in the U.S. and in international cultures which embraced American striptease. By the 1980s, the pole dancing and highly explicit imagery associated with today's performers was widely accepted and frequently portrayed in film, television, and theater.

==== 1980s–1990s ====
In addition to lesser-known videos such as A Night at the Revuebar (1983), the 1980s also featured mainstream films involving strippers and their work as part of the central narrative. These included Flashdance (1983), which told the story of blue-collar worker Alexandra (Alex) Owens (Jennifer Beals), who works as an exotic dancer in a Pittsburgh, Pennsylvania, bar at night and at a steel mill as a welder during the day. Blaze (1989) features Lolita Davidovitch as notorious stripper Blaze Starr. Starr herself appears in the film in a cameo role. Exotica (1994), directed by Atom Egoyan, is set in a Canadian lap-dance club, and portrays a man's (Bruce Greenwood) obsession with a schoolgirl stripper named Christina (Mia Kirshner). Showgirls (1995) was directed by Paul Verhoeven and starred Elizabeth Berkley and Gina Gershon. Striptease (1996), was an adaptation of the novel starring Demi Moore. The Players Club (1998) starred LisaRaye as a girl who becomes a stripper to earn enough money to enter college and study journalism.

In Jekyll and Hyde (1997), the character of Lucy Harris (originally portrayed by Linda Eder) works as a prostitute and stripper in a small London club called The Red Rat, where she meets a multi-dimension man named Doctor Henry Jekyll, who turns into his evil persona Mr. Edward Hyde. Lucy performs the song 'Bring on the Men' during a show at the Red Rat (which was later replaced with 'Good 'n' Evil' in the Broadway production, some claiming 'Bring on the Men' was too 'risqué'). In Neighbours (1985), the character of Daphne is originally a stripper at Des's bucks party, and eventually goes on to marry him. Married... with Children (1987–1997) often featured Al Bundy, Jefferson D'Arcy, and the NO MA'AM crew spending a night at the Nudie Bar. In the six seasons of The Sopranos (1999–2007), business was often conducted at the Bada Bing strip club.

==== 2000s–present ====
By the 2000s, visits to strip clubs by characters in action movies were a common occurrence. Dancing at the Blue Iguana (2000) is a feature film starring Daryl Hannah. The female cast of the film researched the film by dancing at strip clubs and created their parts and their storylines to be as realistic as possible. The Raymond Revuebar the Art of Striptease (2002) is a documentary, directed by Simon Weitzman. Los Debutantes (2003) is a Chilean film set in a strip-club in Santiago. Portraits of a Naked Lady Dancer (2004) is a documentary, directed by Deborah Rowe. In Closer (2004), Natalie Portman plays Alice, a young stripper just arrived in London from America. Crazy Horse Le Show (2004) features dance routines from the Crazy Horse, Paris. I Know Who Killed Me (2007) stars Lindsay Lohan as Dakota Moss, an alluring stripper involved in the machinations of a serial killer, and features a long striptease sequence at a strip club. In 2009, a DVD called "Crazy Horse Paris" featuring Dita Von Teese was released. Barely Phyllis is a play on Phyllis Dixey which was first staged at the Pomegranate Theatre, Chesterfield in 2009. A strip club is prominently featured in the film "Megan and Andrew go to a Strip Club" (2011) in which the title characters go to a strip club. Stripsearch (2001–) is an ongoing Australian reality television show which centers around the training of male strippers. In Degrassi: The Next Generation (2007), in the two-part season 6 finale, titled Don't You Want Me, Alex Nunez resorts to stripping after her mother and herself do not have enough money to pay the rent on their apartment.

=== Notable locations ===
One of the most famous strip clubs in the U.S. is on Route 17 in Lodi, New Jersey. It was featured on the television show The Sopranos. The club is actually a go-go bar, serving alcohol with dancers, and it does not offer nudity. It is called "Satin Dolls" in real life, but is known more universally around the world and in the show as "The Bada Bing". The Gold Club was an Atlanta adult entertainment club receiving national attention for the indictment of several of its owners, managers, and employees. The Gold Club trial received significant attention because numerous significant professional athletes were called to testify. The club was closed after the convictions of its owner plus several managers and employees.

Sapphire Gentlemen's Club in Las Vegas has been billed as the world's largest strip club. In 2006, it sold at auction for US$80 million (equivalent to US$128 million in 2025). Tampa, Florida, is well known for its strip clubs, including the famous Mons Venus. Howard Stern, a radio host and television personality, makes frequent mention of 'Rick's Cabaret' which operates in several cities. Bangkok and Pattaya in Thailand are world-famous for their go bars offering a variety of extra services.

=== Top clubs ===
Given the variety of club formats and laws governing the operation of strip clubs around the world, a definitive and objective list of top clubs is not practical. The popularity of a given club is an indicator of its quality, as is the word of mouth among customers who have visited a cross section of clubs in different regions. A 2013 article published by the AskMen.com portal posted a list of the top 10 strip clubs in the world. According to their criteria, which included aesthetics, quality of girls, services, and such, the top clubs at the time were:

1. Playhouse Gentleman's Club, Warsaw
2. Night Flight, Moscow
3. Larry Flynt's Hustler Club, New York City
4. 4 Play Gentlemen's Club, Los Angeles
5. Spearmint Rhino, Las Vegas
6. Le Crazy Horse, Paris
7. Seventh Heaven, Tokyo
8. Temptations, Bristol
9. Wanda's, Montreal
10. K5 Relax, Prague

U.S. style striptease remains a global phenomenon and culturally accepted form of entertainment, despite its scrutiny in legal circles and popular media. Over half of clubs still open from the list are located outside the United States. Popular internet sites for strip club enthusiasts also have Top Club lists calculated from input from their online visitors. The Ultimate Strip Club List has a Top 100 Strip Clubs list, generated by analyzing the ratings for all of its clubs as entered by individual reviewers. Its list regularly includes strip clubs from outside the U.S. and the site details clubs from countries across six continents. The Strip Club Network, calculates its online Strip Club List: Top 100 Clubs, by the total number of views that each club information page has received on their website.

== See also ==
- List of strip clubs
- Adult movie theater
- American burlesque
- Bar fine
- Bargirl
- Breastaurant
- Cabaret
- Cage dancing
- Can Can
- Clip joint
- Cocktail waitress
- Dance bar
- Go-go dancing
- Hostess club
- Lap dancing
- Peep show
- Pole dancing
- Sex club
- Sex show
- Stripper
- Striptease
- Table dancing
- Taxi dancer
- Taxi dance hall

== Bibliography ==
- R. Danielle Egan; Katherine Frank; Merri Lisa Johnson (2005). Egan, R. Danielle; Frank, K.; Johnson, M. L. (eds.). Flesh for Fantasy: Producing and Consuming Exotic Dance. New York, U.S.: Thunder's Mouth Press, Avalon Publishing Group. ISBN 978-1-56025-721-9.
- Frank, Katherine (2005). G-Strings and Sympathy: Strip Club Regulars and Male Desire. Durham and London: Duke University Press. ISBN 978-0-8223-2972-5.
- Price-Glynn, Kim (2010). Strip Club: Gender, Power, and Sex Work. New York University Press. ISBN 9780814767818.
