= Strip game =

Game involving clothing removal

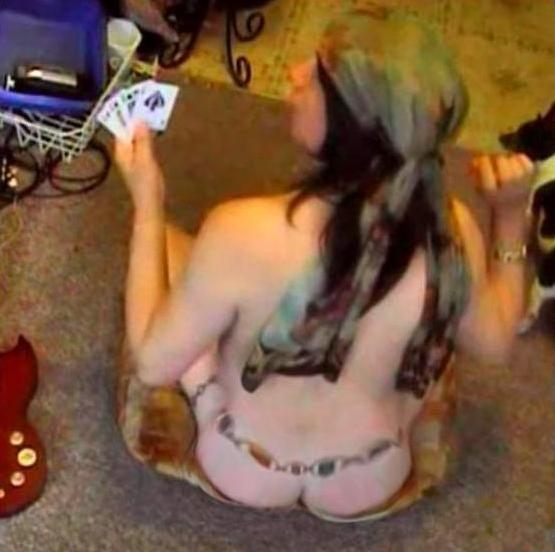
- An almost-naked player in a strip card game
- Genres: Party game, erotic game
- Players: Two or more
- Playing time: Varies
- Chance: Varies
- Skills: Counting, strategy, bluffing, probability

A strip game or stripping game is a game in which the removal of clothing is a gameplay element.

== Classification and basic mechanics ==
Strip games are usually intended to generate an atmosphere of fun in a group of consenting adults. Sometimes strip games are sexualized, and the slow loss of all clothing may be seen as a type of striptease. Games not normally involving clothing loss can be adapted into strip games, and party games are sometimes used. Alternatively, games can be invented specifically as strip games.

== Notable games ==
=== Euchre ===
Strip euchre developed in the late 1800s from a euchre variant known as 'progressive euchre'.

=== Mahjong ===
A popular type of Japanese arcade game in the late-1980s and 1990s was strip mahjong (Japanese: 脱衣麻雀, Hepburn: datsui mājan), which are adult video games where players compete in two-player matches of Richi mahjong against a computer opponent. Victories in matches are rewarded by showing cutscenes of the corresponding character taking off their clothing, typically using either digitized sprites of live-action models, anime artwork, or FMVs featuring adult video actors.

A game of strip mahjong is depicted in the allegorical painting Beijing 2008.

=== Murchéh daréh ===
"Murcheh dareh che kar konam?" ("There are ants [here], what shall I do?"), or just "Murcheh dareh" (مورچه داره, There Are Ants), is a traditional Iranian song and dance-based game played by women, although a parody played by men exists ("Zar gazidam").

=== Poker ===
Strip poker is a party game and a variation of the traditional poker where players remove clothing when they lose a round. Any form of poker can be adapted to a strip form; however, it is usually played with simple variants with few betting rounds, like five-card draw.

Strip poker can be played by single-sex groups or by mixed groups in social situations and intended to generate an atmosphere of fun and to lighten the social atmosphere by the removal of clothing. While the game is sometimes employed as a type of foreplay, it is itself usually not considered a sexual interaction due to the fact that it does not require contact and full nudity is involved only at the end of the game or sometimes not at all (depending on rule variants). The game is sometimes integrated with Truth or Dare? rules. Strip poker has been adapted for solo gameplay, such as by use of online or offline video games.

==== Rules ====
At the beginning of each turn, each player must remove an article of clothing as an ante. If there are two couples playing there should be four shoes in the pot before the cards are dealt. At the outset, one of the articles of clothing is removed from the game permanently. So the winner will receive three articles of clothing in the ante.

The opener must bet, and they can be raised, just like ordinary poker. After the draw, the players make another bet, like regular poker. Once an article of clothing is removed, it cannot be put back on. The clothing is just used as a stake for betting. Only clothing can be bet. No player may withdraw once the game begins without forfeiting all articles of clothing.

==== Strategy ====
In some rule sets, players who fold before the flop are not required to remove clothing. As such, a player who is uncomfortable removing clothing (or, more commonly, a player who does not want to remove all their clothing first) can simply fold very often or every time before the flop, essentially playing a "tight" pre-flop strategy. Using this strategy, a player could stay clothed for the entire game simply by folding their hands.

Strip poker requires a different overall strategy from poker played with betting chips since the maximum loss on a hand of strip poker is (typically) one item of clothing. In a betting environment, a player who stays in the pot with a weak hand is liable to lose many chips in a single hand. In strip poker, the risk of staying in a hand is significantly limited, so players can play hands with lower probabilities than they would in a cash game. For example, in a cash game, because it occurs only 8% of the time, an inside straight draw might be a poor hand to play, hence the saying "never draw to an inside straight". In strip poker, when the potential loss is only one item of clothing whether you fold or call, an 8% chance to win the hand is better than the alternative.

Another variant uses some sort of betting token, allowing for normal poker strategies. Once a player runs out of tokens, they can "sell" a piece of clothing for more tokens in order to stay in the game.

==== History ====
While it has been suggested that strip poker originated in New Orleans brothels in the United States around the same time as original poker in the 19th century, the term is only attested since the 20th century. Strip poker most likely began as a prank or hazing among college-age boys, and as late as the 1930s, the current mixed-gender version was called "mixed strip poker" in England to differentiate it from the all-male variety.

=== Yakyūken ===
Popularised by Kinichi Hagimoto (although he later expressed regret) and inspired by contemporary Japanese baseball pep routines — Yakyūken (野球拳) means 'baseball fist' — strip games became a popular fixture of comedy and game shows in the mid-20th century initially in the form of yakyūken, in which several rounds of jyan-ken-pon (rock-paper-scissors) are played and televised, with the loser removing a layer of clothing.

== Legality ==
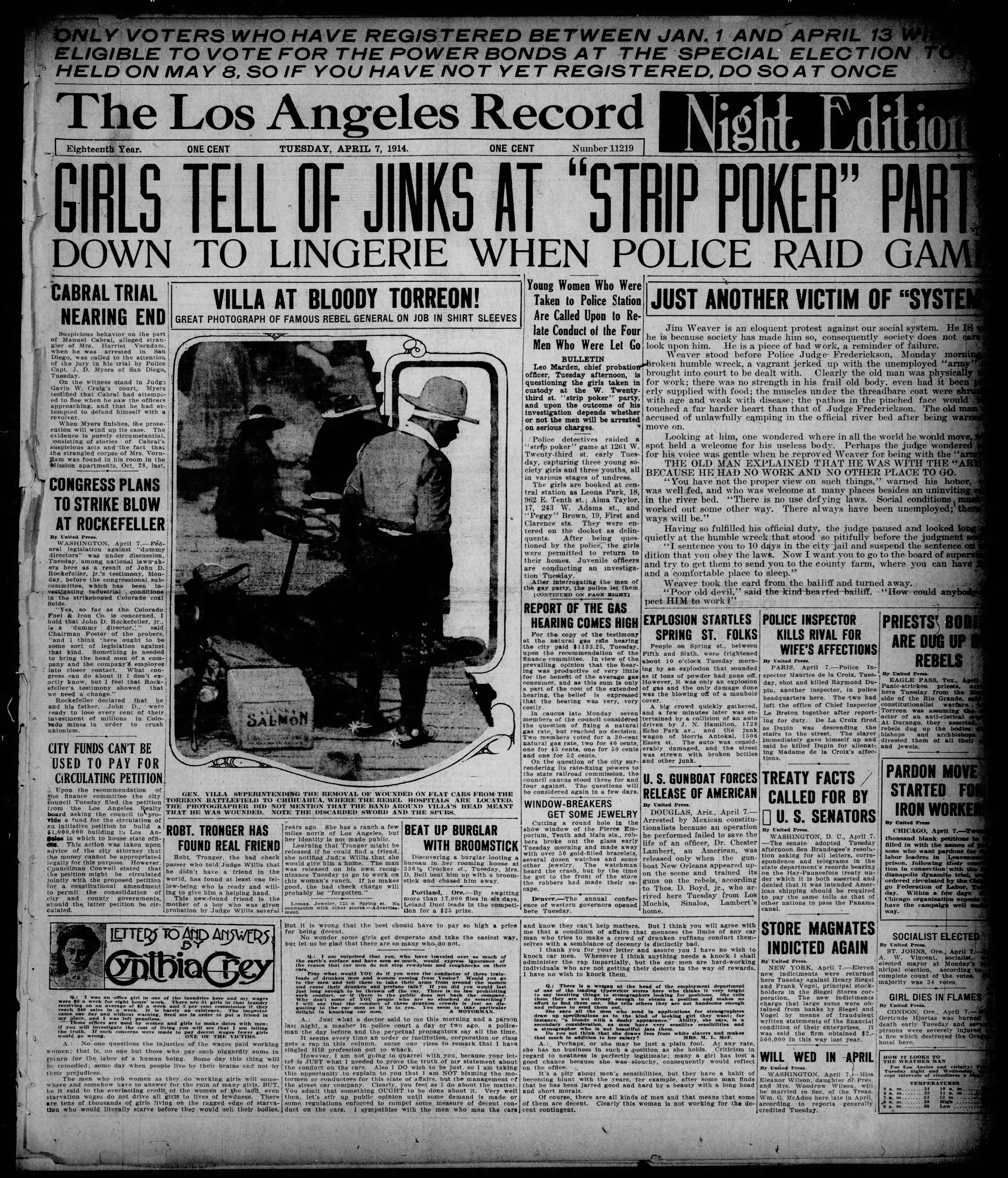

Depending on jurisdiction and the particular circumstances of the game, strip games may encounter regulation on the grounds of clothes-wearing (or not wearing) norms, gaming and gambling, and sexual expression. Additionally, verbally coercing someone to play a strip game is often considered a form of sexual harassment.

In 2013, the concept of strip sports betting was launched in the United States by creating live internet broadcasts using models and pornstars who bet on football games and take their clothes off as they lose.

== See also ==
- Card game – Game using playing cards as the primary device
- Dance of the bee – Erotic Egyptian dance
- Drinking game – Game which involves the consumption of alcoholic beverages
- Indecent exposure – Public indecency involving nudity
- Naked party – Collegiate social gathering
- Parlor game – Group game played indoors
- Shirts versus skins – Way of making sports team members visually distinct
- Truth or dare – Verbal party game
