= Shirts and skins =

Shirts and Skins may refer to:

- Shirts versus skins, a common phrase denoting team affiliations in an informal sports game.
- Shirts & Skins, a reality television series about gay basketball players.
