= Beijing 2008 (painting) =

2005 painting by Liu Yi

北京2008
- English: Beijing 2008
- Artist: Liu Yi (or Liu Lui)
- Year: 2005
- Type: Oil on canvas
- Subject: Political pornography
- Dimensions: 121 x 182
- Location: Private collection
- Owner: Tang Ju

Beijing 2008 (Chinese: 北京2008) is a 2005 oil painting by a Chinese Canadian painter Liu Yi. It depicts four naked or half-naked women playing a game of strip mahjong and is their best known work.

Liu Yi painted a second new version of the painting titled "Women Playing Majong" in 2006, which differs only slightly from its predecessor.

In 2012, the painting was sold at a Beijing action for 19.55 million RMB.

== Political themes ==
=== Beijing 2008 ===
External image
- Beijing 2008 on the webpage

The most widely circulated expression is the implied political allegory. The four women playing mahjong represent the four influential powers in East Asia. four women are playing strip mahjong, the western-faced women are the United States and Russia, the eastern-faced women are China and Japan. The rules of the game are played in the Eastern style of mahjong. The bets are based on the amount of clothes worn to determine the ultimate victory.

The state of dress of the four women represents the strength of the country, and the woman in the front view is the United States. The American is the most dressed but naked underneath and has the strongest strength on the table, holding her head in her hands and seemingly distracted by the game, with her eyes looking towards Taiwan.

The woman with one pair of panties left on the right is Russia, and the Russian is lying on the ground not caring about the process. One foot is stretched towards the United States and the other hand in the direction of China, indicating that she is in the process of switching tiles. Both sides are moving to get the maximum benefit in secret.

The tattooed woman on the lower back is China, her upper body is naked but her lower body is hidden. She also hid two concealed tiles. The tile on the table, "East", is China's resurgence through the East Wind, and also hints at the Dongfeng missiles as a powerful weapon for China on the table. She looks good on the one hand, but no one knows what good tiles she has in her hand, and she is making small moves under the table.

The naked woman on the far left is Japan, who is looking at her tiles intently and completely unaware of what the others are doing. She is just playing her own game.

The woman holding the small water dish is Taiwan, wearing a traditional dudou and bottomless to represent Taiwan as the inheritor of Chinese civilization. She is holding a fruit plate in one hand and a knife in the other. Her expression seems to be gloomy and angry as she watches the betting game. She is not eligible to enter the game and can only serve fruit to the winner regardless of the outcome.

The dark clouds in the sky outside the window symbolize the dangerous situation, suggesting that a crisis on both sides of the Taiwan Strait is about to burst. The portrait on the wall in the upper left corner feature the beard of Sun Yat-sen, the bald head of Chiang Kai-shek, and the facial features of Mao Zedong, symbolizing the combination of China's history over the past century.

The state of the four women indicates the next change. If China loses one game and becomes Russia (similar to the breakup of the Soviet Union). If the United States plays to lose and will become Russia. If Russia loses again and will have nothing. If Japan plays to lose and will be out immediately. The winner will be between the United States and China, although the United States is the most well-dressed and strongest country. But the game is, after all, Eastern mahjong, not Western poker. It is doubtful how much advantage the United States has in playing the game in the Chinese way.

== Owner ==
"Beijing 2008" was sold to Tang Ju for 19.55 million RMB ($3.24 million US dollars) at the 2012 Poly Autumn Auction in Beijing.
