= Khawal =

Egyptian cross-dressed male dancer

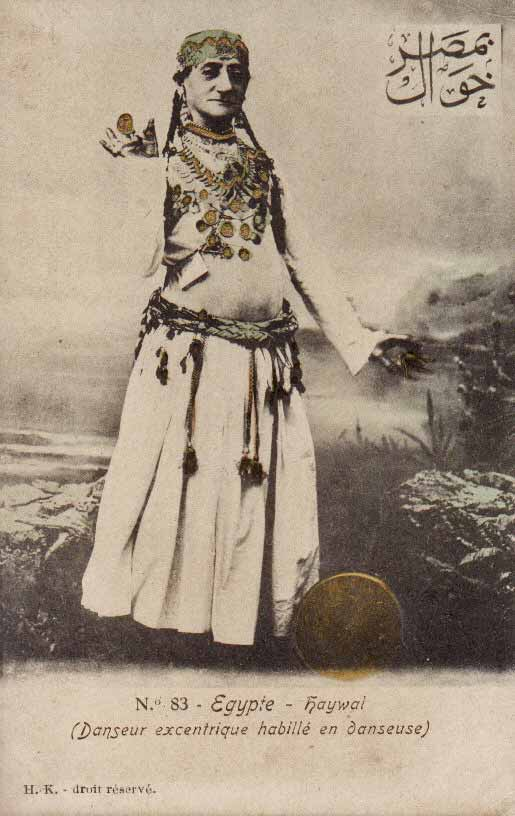
Postcard depicting a khawal (pre-1907)

A khawal (Arabic: خَوَلْ; pl. khawalat) was a type of Egyptian cross-dressing dancer popular between the 1800s and 1900s. After Muhammad Ali's societal reforms in 1834, khawalat took on roles previously performed by female ghawazi dancers in parts of Egypt.

== Culture ==
Orientalist writer Edward William Lane describes khawal appearance and mannerisms during his time in Egypt:

As they impersonate women, their dances are exactly of the same description as those of the Ghawazee [female dancers] ... Their general appearance ... is more feminine than masculine: they suffer the hair of the head to grow long, and generally braid it, in the manner of women ... they imitate the women also in applying kohl and henna to their eyes and hands like women. In the streets, when not engaged in dancing, they often veil their faces; not from shame, but merely to affect the manners of women.

The khawalat gained popularity after the ousting of ghawazi dancers from Cairo, replacing them at events and celebrations such as weddings, births, circumcisions, and festivals. However, they were not necessarily mutually exclusive; Lane describes both khawal and ghawazi dancers being present during a wedding celebration.

Khawalat distinguished themselves by wearing a mixture of men's and women's clothing, which brought attention to the difference of their role from traditional male and female expectations. They were perceived as sexually available; their male audiences found their ambiguity seductive.

Khawalat commonly performed for foreign visitors, variously shocking or delighting them.

In modern Egyptian slang, the term is derogatory and refers to a passive gay man, and is considered offensive.
