= Dance of the bee =

Erotic Egyptian dance

The Dance of the bee or Dance of the wasp was a provocative Egyptian dance, part of the repertoire of the dancing girls of the Ghawazee. It was perhaps not unlike the famous Dance of the seven veils. In the dance of the bee, the dancer portrays herself as having had a stinging insect fly into her clothes, and attempts to free the insect before she is stung by removing her clothes one by one.

The dance is mentioned in the travel accounts of Gustave Flaubert, and was performed for him by a Ghawazee dancer known only under the pseudonym Kuchuk Hanem.
