= Shirts versus skins =

Way of making sports team members visually distinct

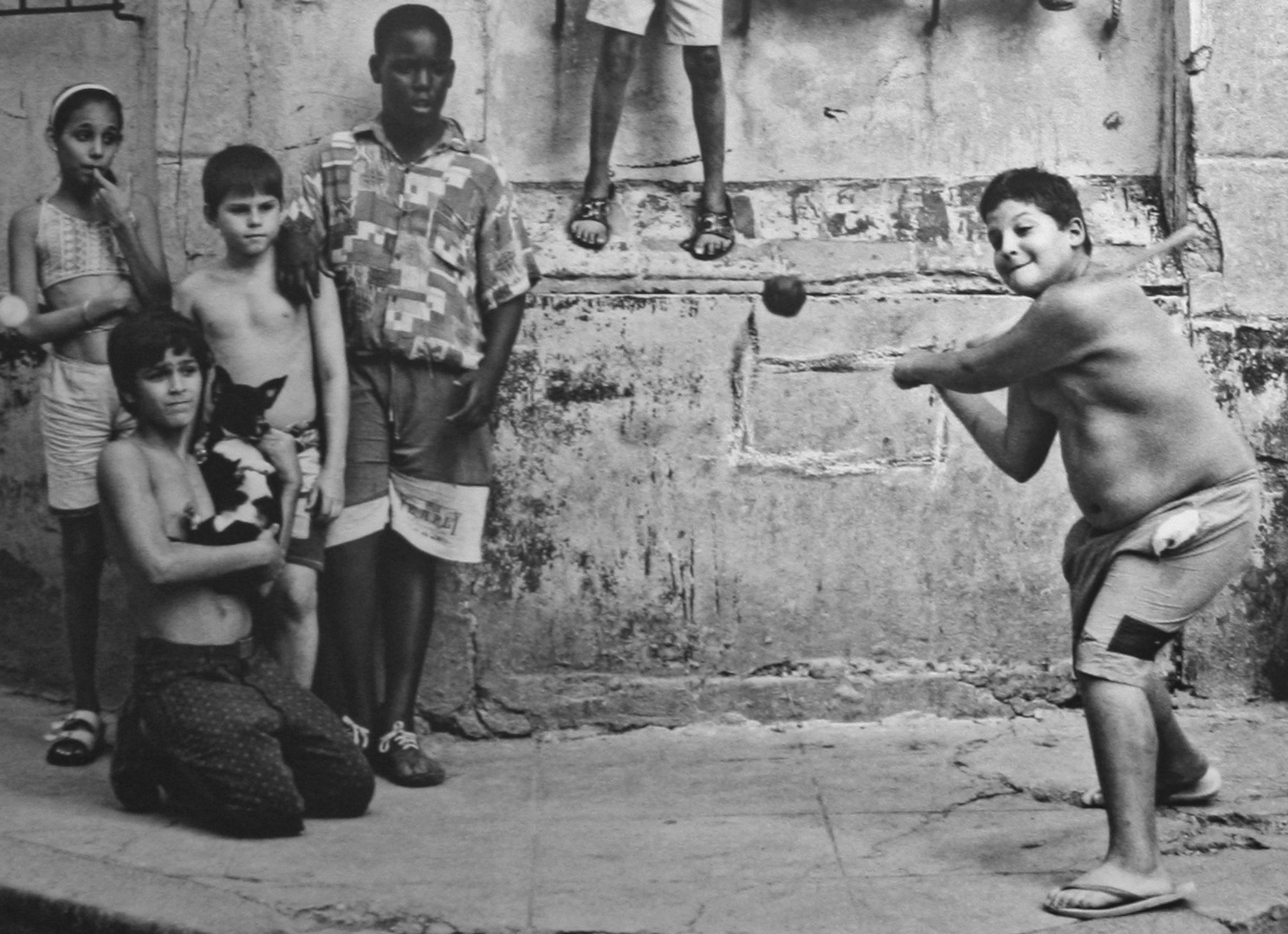
A stickball game in progress in 1999 in Havana, Cuba

In sports, shirts vs skins (or shirts and skins) is a common form of denoting team affiliations in a pick-up game or in school; typically, when played by boys on a public court or field, such as in a city park or schoolyard, or during physical education class or intramural sports at school. The practice involves the members of one team wearing shirts while the ones of the other team go shirtless. This is used in the absence of uniforms.

== Use ==
This simple form of recognition can be a regular sight in basketball, streetball, street football, ultimate, backyard football (gridiron-style), and other pick-up games. The identification by manner of dress negates the need to remember the division of players among friends, or to learn the faces of strangers in a pick-up game.

The system is most frequently applied to male participants, due to female toplessness taboos. In coed shirts/skins games where these taboos are observed, female players more often align exclusively as "shirts" (for example, 3 females and 9 males, at a pickup basketball court, would team as 6 male "skins" versus 3 male and 3 female "shirts".)

== Alternatives ==
Alternatively, or at greater female-to-male ratios or when a balance between male and female players is sought, players in pinnies can be recognised by teammates and opponents as "skins", should such pinnies be available. At least one prominent charity football event uses blonde versus brunette hair color as an alternative to shirts and skins, with competitors allowed to dye their hair to match their respective team.

== See also ==
The dictionary definition of shirts and skins at Wiktionary

- Amateur sports
- Strip games
