= Ghawazi =

Female dancers for money

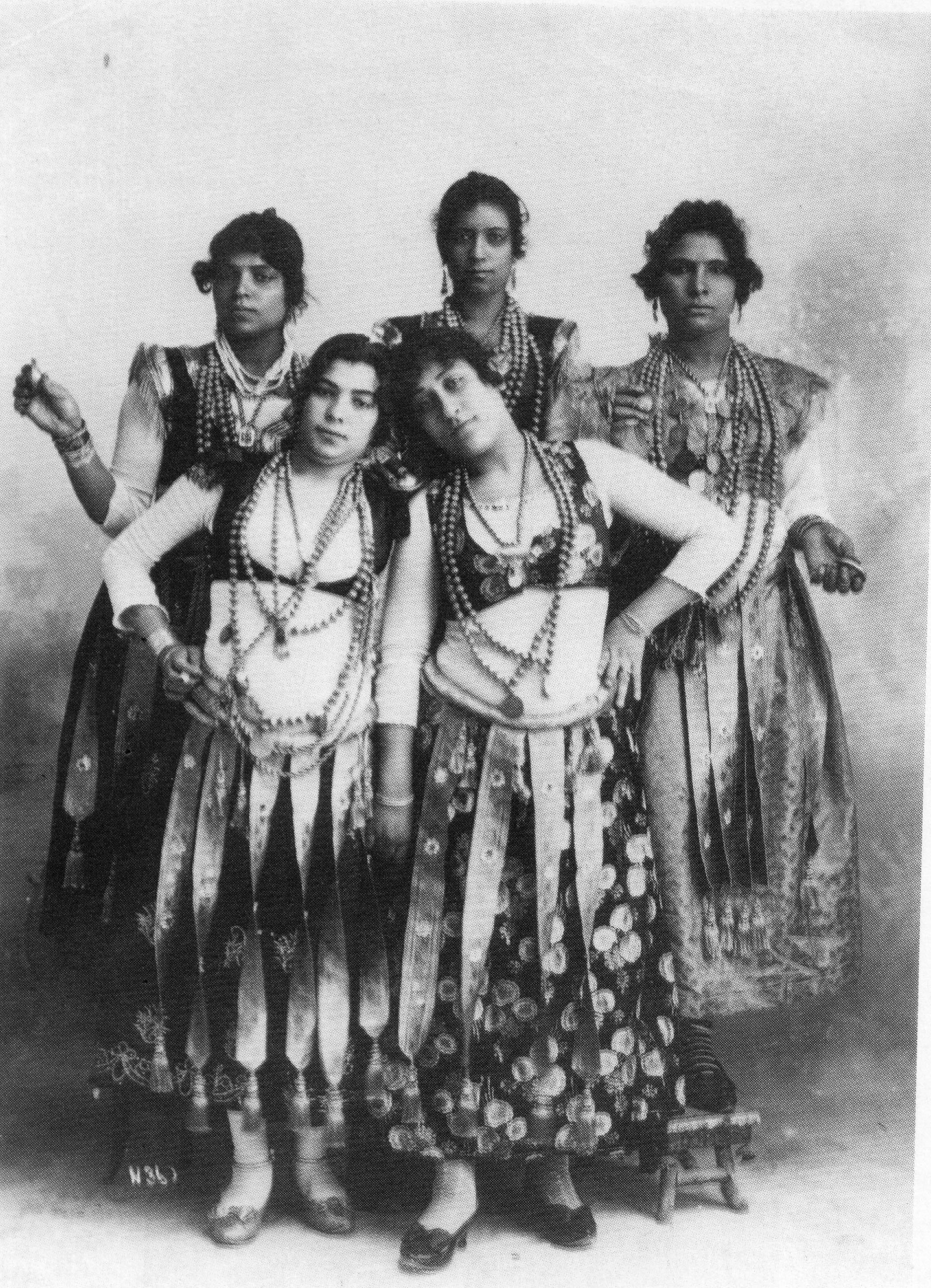
Group of Ghawazi dancers (c. 1880)

Ghawazi (also ghawazee) (Arabic: الغوازي) are female dancers who danced in return for money in public settings, and the streets and most of them originally came from Upper Egypt. There were male dancers as well, including men who performed movements associated with women and who were pejoratively called khawal.

Traditional Ghawazi dancers have become less common as time passes. There are main movements and positioning of two of the most popular Ghawazi groups that are found in modern Egypt; The Banat Mazin (Arabic: بنات مازن) and the Sumbati Ghawazee (Arabic: غوازي السنباطي). The Banat Mazin are famous for their traditional Upper Egyptian vintage-style costume, so you can see how the movements would be affected by the costuming. The Sagat (finger cymbals), are optional but recommended in the Upper Egyptian/Saidi style.

== Name ==
The Arabic غوازي ghawāzī (singular غازية ghāziya) means "conqueror", as the ghaziya is said to "conquer" the hearts of her audience. They were also known as awālim (singular alma, transliterated almeh in French as almée), but in Egypt, Awalim are the traditional Egyptian dancers and singers of the city, not rural areas, who used to perform in respectable events such as the weddings and festivities of notable people.

Both terms are 19th-century euphemisms for "erotic dancer"; almeh literally means "learned woman" and came to be used as a replacement for ghaziya after the ghawazi were legally banned in 1834.

An almeh originally was a courtesan in Egyptian culture, a woman educated to sing and recite classical poetry and to discourse. After the ghawazi were banned, they were forced to pretend that they were in fact awalim. The term almeh was introduced in French Orientalism as almée and used synonymously with "belly dancer".

== History ==
The practice began as a few Egyptian Domari refused to dance for free. Fellahin of Upper Egypt adopted the practice, developing a more rural and traditional style accompanied by Egyptian songs.

In 1834, the ghawazi were banished from Cairo to Upper Egypt by Muhammad Ali. Initially, the Ghawazi were a very small group who were banished because of their low-class dancing. By the time of their banishment the term had become a general term for any dancers as it included all the traditional and folk dances of Upper Egyptians, mainly featuring mizmars and heavy bass lines and other traditional Egyptian music in the background.

Beginning in the first half of the 19th century, descriptions and depictions of ghawazi dancers became famous in European Orientalism, and the style was described as danse de ventre or belly-dance from the 1860s, the most famous Ghawazi mentioned in the books of foreign travelers was Kouchouk Hanem, a Ghawazi from Upper Egypt.

The first Ghawazis performed unveiled in the streets. Rapid hip movement and use of brass finger cymbals/hand castanets characterized their dance. Musicians of their tribe usually accompanied them in their dance. They usually wore kohl around their eyes and henna on their fingers, palms, toes and feet.

The Ghawazi performed in the court of a house, or in the street, before the door, on certain occasions of festivity in the harem. They were never admitted into a respectable harem, but were frequently hired to entertain a party of men in the house of some rake. Both women and men enjoyed their entertainment. However, many people who were more religious, or of the higher classes, disapproved of them.

Many people liked the dancing of the Ghawazi, but felt it was improper because of its being danced by women who should not expose themselves in this manner. Because of this, there was a small number of young male performers called Khawals. The Khawals were Egyptian male traditional dancers who impersonated the women of the Ghawazi and their dance. They were known to impersonate every aspect of the women including their dance and use of castanets.

The word khawal in Egypt is modern derogatory slang for a man participating in passive gay intercourse.

== Contemporary practitioners ==
Representing diverse historical backgrounds, some of the Ghawazi of the Qena region belong to ethnic minorities such as the Nawar (or Nawara), Halab and Bahlawen.

Particularly well known are the Banat Maazin family, Nawar people who settled in Luxor and were filmed in the 70s and 80s. Many consider the Maazin family to be the only practicing family left of the original line of Ghawazi dancers. Another line of dancers who were famous in Luxor and Qena was Fawzia Mohamed Ibrahim.

== Influence on Western belly-dance ==
The style of dance and costuming of the Ghawazi has been especially influential in crafting the look of American Tribal Style Belly Dance. The Gypsy Ghawazi dress consists of an Ottoman coat with slits, known as a Yelek or entari. The abdomen is covered by these coats. Turkish harem pants are worn under these coats. The coats are typically ankle-length, though some modern Ghawazi troupes wear a shorter version over a full, knee-length skirt. Ghawazi dancers often adorn their heads with elaborate headdresses, with dancers often accompanying themselves by playing zils, or small cymbals that are used by dancers in many forms of Middle Eastern dance.

In the Upper Egyptian style, the dancers wear the popular Saidi Telli dress, a black and glittery traditional Egyptian dress, and they also wear other types of traditional dresses, such as embroidered, colorful, and decorated silk dresses. The main dancers are accompanied by Saidi music, mainly the Egyptian flute and traditional Saidi songs narrating stories about the beauty of Qena, Assuit, Minya and their traditions.

== Gallery ==
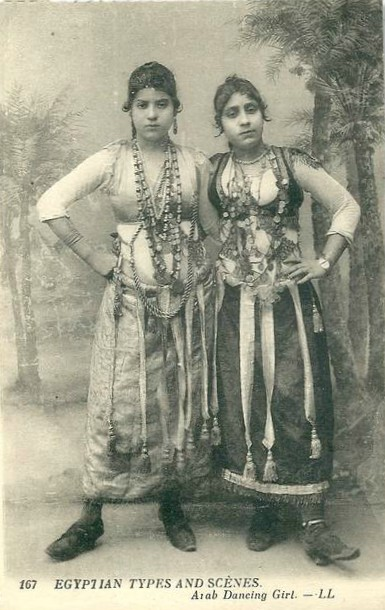
Postcard photograph of two dancing girls posing in a dance costume with the name of "Egyptian types and scenes" (c. 1900).

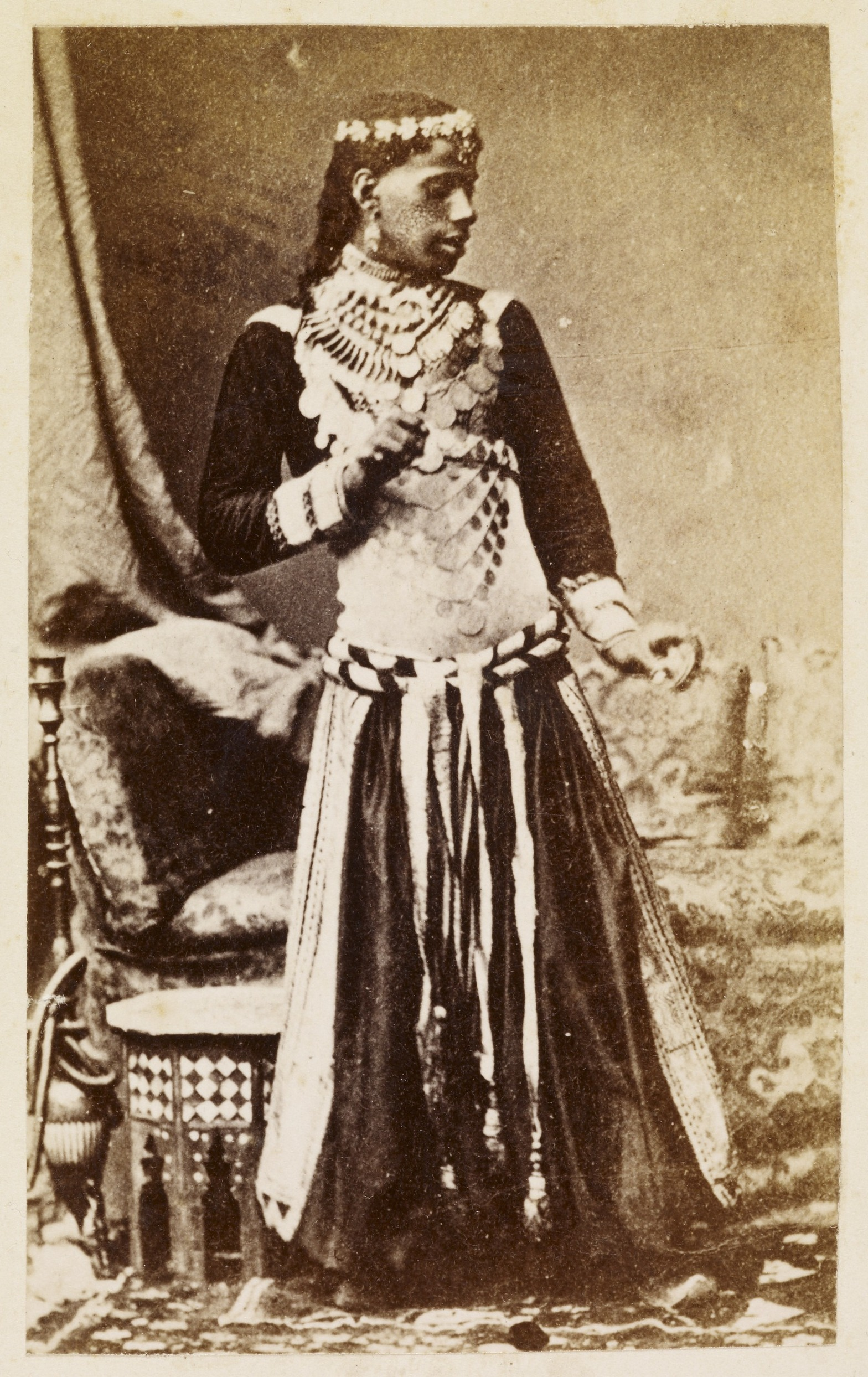
A khawal slave (dancing boy) from Upper Egypt dressed in a female dancing costume (c. 1870).
