= Kuchuk Hanem =

Egyptian dancer

Kuchuk Hanem was a famed beauty and Ghawazee dancer of Esna, mentioned in two unrelated accounts of travel to Egypt, the French novelist Gustave Flaubert and the American adventurer George William Curtis.

Kuchuk Hanem became a key figure and symbol in Flaubert's Orientalist accounts of the East. Flaubert visited her during his sojourn in Egypt on his journey to the East in 1849-51 accompanied by Maxime Du Camp. The orientalist themes that pervade his work depended heavily on his experiences in Egypt and his likely sexual liaison with Kuchuk Hanem. Dancers in two of his novellas, Herodias and Temptation of Saint Anthony, evoke a woman dancer who performs scenes from Salome and the Queen of Sheba. Both of these dances were standards of the repertoire of dancers of this period, especially a dance step known as "the bee" or "the wasp," with the dancer standing musing in a pensive posture until a buzzing insect flies into her clothing and she "flees" in terror, dancing rapidly, and removing articles of clothing in the manner of a provocative strip-tease. Later, Kuchuk Hanem was the subject of an 1851 poem by Louis Bouilhet, "Kuchuk-Hanem, Souveneer" which was inspired by Flaubert's accounts from letters. Louise Colet, a mistress of Flaubert, is said to have sought out the aging dancer on a trip to Egypt at the time of the opening of the Suez Canal, in order to report back to Flaubert the ravages that time had wrought on the woman he so admired.

It seems certain that she was also an influence on George William Curtis, suggesting that she was one of the most sought-after entertainers in Upper Egypt during the colonial period. Comparisons of the two narratives demonstrate a house with a courtyard, a stairway in poor repair leading to an upper room furnished with two divans, a young female attendant named Zeneb, an old man playing a rebaba, and an old woman who kept time on the tar.

"Kuchuk Hanem" is not a proper name and actually means "little lady" in Turkish (küçük hanım). It might be a term of endearment applied to a child, a lover, or a famous dancer. Flaubert reports that she was from Sohag from Upper Egypt but it remains unclear if this was a name chosen by the woman to represent herself to the colonial tourists or if this is a casual shorthand name used by the two writers to describe her. The sensationalized and eroticized presence of Kuchuk Hanem within the literature of this period underscores early misrepresentations of non-western women in the imagination of the West.

== See also ==
- Dance of the bee
- Dance of the seven veils
