= Yelek =

Ottoman bodice or waistcoat

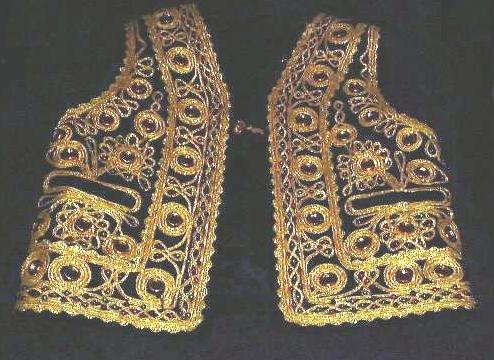
A traditional jelick

A yelek (also spelled jelick in older English texts) is the bodice or waistcoat of Ottoman origin, traditionally worn by women. The yelek is typically a sleeveless and collarless garment and usually has small pockets on the sides. Traditional yeleks are generally embroidered and made out of silk cloth as well as velvet and leather. During the Ottoman era, the yelek was a hip-length jacket or vest worn for warmth by both sexes. It could have long sleeves, short sleeves, or no sleeves, and often had a small standing collar. A shorter variant, the anteri (or "anteree", anterija) was also popular.

In present-day Turkish, yelek is also the common word for a modern, usually sleeveless or short-sleeved vest, both for women and for men.

== See also ==
- Waistcoat
- Bodice
- Ottoman clothing

== Sources and references ==
- Merriam-Webster Unabridged - Jelick entry
