= Sexually oriented business =

Business within the sex industry

In United States law, a sexually oriented business (S.O.B.) is a business that is part of the sex industry, such as sites of erotic performance and erotic paraphernalia stores. Often regulations of SOBs enter law as part of zoning regulations by jurisdictions when trying to maintain the character of a particular community and discourage elements of society that may be considered harmful for their connection to the sex industry. Though many regulations of SOBs arguably violate First Amendment rights in the United States, lawmakers will use the secondary effects doctrine—in which restrictions of First Amendment rights are legal if the restrictions can prevent harm to the larger community—to justify regulation of SOBs.

== Legal cases ==
In an opinion deemed by the press as the "world's cheekiest written ruling" and "one of the funniest, most eloquent court documents we've ever seen", district court Judge John Biery articulated the constitutional and practical concerns of regulating certain types of scanty clothing in SOBs in San Antonio in 35 Bar and Grille LLC, et al. v. The City of San Antonio (2013).
