= 2016 Laurence Olivier Awards =

Award ceremony

- Date: 3 April 2016
- Location: Royal Opera House
- Hosted by: Michael Ball

Television/radio coverage
- Network: ITV

The 2016 Laurence Olivier Awards were held on Sunday 3 April 2016 at the Royal Opera House, London. The 40th anniversary ceremony was hosted by Michael Ball. A highlights show was broadcast on ITV shortly after the live event ended.

== Eligibility ==
Any new production that opened between 26 February 2015 and 16 February 2016 in a theatre represented in membership of the Society of London Theatre was eligible for consideration, provided it had performed at least 30 performances.

== Event calendar ==
- 13 February: Voting opens for the Audience Award for Most Popular Show
- 29 February: Nominations announced by Michael Ball and Imelda Staunton
- 11 March: Voting closes for the Audience Award
- 14 March: Nominations announced for the Audience Award
- 3 April: Award ceremony held

== Winners and nominees ==
The nominations were announced on 29 February 2016 in 26 categories.

Best New Play	Best New Musical
Hangmen by Martin McDonagh – Jerwood Downstairs, Royal Court / Wyndham's; Farinelli and the King by Claire van Kampen – Duke of York's; People, Places and Things by Duncan MacMillan – National Theatre Dorfman; The Father by Florian Zeller, translated by Christopher Hampton – Wyndham's	Kinky Boots – Adelphi; Bend It Like Beckham – Phoenix; In the Heights – King's Cross; Mrs Henderson Presents – Noël Coward
Best Revival	Best Musical Revival
Ma Rainey's Black Bottom – National Theatre Lyttelton; Hamlet – Barbican; Les liaisons dangereuses – Donmar Warehouse; The Winter's Tale – Garrick	Gypsy – Savoy; Bugsy Malone – Lyric Hammersmith; Guys and Dolls – Savoy; Seven Brides for Seven Brothers – Regent's Park Open Air
Best New Comedy	Best Entertainment and Family
Nell Gwynn by Jessica Swale – Apollo; A Christmas Carol by Patrick Barlow – Noël Coward; Hand to God by Robert Askins – Vaudeville; Peter Pan Goes Wrong by Henry Shields, Jonathan Sayer and Henry Lewis – Apollo	Showstopper! The Improvised Musical – Apollo; Alice's Adventures Underground – Vaults; I Want My Hat Back – National Theatre Temporary; The Lorax – Old Vic; Peter Pan – Regent's Park Open Air
Best Actor	Best Actress
Kenneth Cranham as André in The Father – Wyndham's; Kenneth Branagh as King Leontes in The Winter's Tale – Garrick; Benedict Cumberbatch as Prince Hamlet in Hamlet – Barbican; Adrian Lester as Ira Aldridge in Red Velvet – Garrick; Mark Rylance as King Philippe V of Spain in Farinelli and the King – Duke of York's	Denise Gough as Emma in People, Places and Things – National Theatre Dorfman; Gemma Arterton as Nell Gwynn in Nell Gwynn – Apollo; Nicole Kidman as Rosalind Franklin in Photograph 51 – Noël Coward; Janet McTeer as Marquise de Merteuil in Les liaisons dangereuses – Donmar Warehouse; Lia Williams as Clytemnestra in Oresteia – Almeida
Best Actor in a Musical	Best Actress in a Musical
Matt Henry as Lola in Kinky Boots – Adelphi; Ian Bartholomew as Vivian Van Damm in Mrs Henderson Presents – Noël Coward; Killian Donnelly as Charlie Price in Kinky Boots – Adelphi; David Haig as Nathan Detroit in Guys and Dolls – Savoy; Jamie Parker as Sky Masterson in Guys and Dolls – Savoy	Imelda Staunton as Mama Rose in Gypsy – Savoy; Tracie Bennett as Laura Henderson in Mrs Henderson Presents – Noël Coward; Natalie Dew as Jess Bhamra in Bend It Like Beckham – Phoenix; Laura Pitt-Pulford as Milly in Seven Brides for Seven Brothers – Regent's Park Open Air; Sophie Thompson as Miss Adelaide in Guys and Dolls – Savoy
Best Actor in a Supporting Role	Best Actress in a Supporting Role
Mark Gatiss as Shpigelsky in Three Days in the Country – National Theatre Lyttelton; Michael Pennington as Antigonus in The Winter's Tale – Garrick; Tom Sturridge as Bobby in American Buffalo – Wyndham's; David Suchet as Lady Bracknell in The Importance of Being Earnest – Vaudeville	Judi Dench as Paulina in The Winter's Tale – Garrick; Michele Dotrice as Nancy in Nell Gwynn – Apollo; Melody Grove as Isabella Farnese in Farinelli and the King – Duke of York's; Catherine Steadman as Jean Tatlock in Oppenheimer – Vaudeville
Best Actor in a Supporting Role in a Musical	Best Actress in a Supporting Role in a Musical
David Bedella as Kevin Rosario in In the Heights – King's Cross; Dan Burton Tulsa in Gypsy – Savoy; Peter Davison as Herbie in Gypsy – Savoy; Gavin Spokes as Nicely Nicely Johnson in Guys and Dolls – Savoy	Lara Pulver as Gypsy Rose Lee in Gypsy – Savoy; Preeya Kalidas as Pinky in Bend It Like Beckham – Phoenix; Amy Lennox as Lauren in Kinky Boots – Adelphi; Emma Williams as Maureen in Mrs Henderson Presents – Noël Coward
Best Director	Best Theatre Choreographer
Robert Icke for Oresteia – Almeida; Rob Ashford and Kenneth Branagh for The Winter's Tale – Garrick; Matthew Dunster for Hangmen – Jerwood Downstairs, Royal Court / Wyndham's; Jonathan Kent for Gypsy – Savoy	Drew McOnie for In the Heights – King's Cross; Carlos Acosta and Andrew Wright for Guys and Dolls – Savoy; Stephen Mear for Gypsy – Savoy; Jerry Mitchell for Kinky Boots – Adelphi
Best Set Design	Best Costume Design
Anna Fleischle for Hangmen – Jerwood Downstairs, Royal Court / Wyndham's; Hildegard Bechtler for Oresteia – Almeida; Es Devlin for Hamlet – Barbican; Jonathan Fensom for Farinelli and the King – Duke of York's	Gregg Barnes for Kinky Boots – Adelphi; Hugh Durrant for Nell Gwynn – Apollo; Jonathan Fensom for Farinelli and the King – Duke of York's; Katrina Lindsay for Bend It Like Beckham – Phoenix
Best Lighting Design	Best Sound Design
Mark Henderson for Gypsy – Savoy; Neil Austin for The Winter's Tale – Garrick; Natasha Chivers for Oresteia – Almeida; James Farncombe for People, Places and Things – National Theatre Dorfman	Tom Gibbons for People, Places and Things – National Theatre Dorfman; George Dennis for The Homecoming – Trafalgar Studios 1; Christopher Shutt for The Father – Wyndham's; Christopher Shutt for Hamlet – Barbican
Outstanding Achievement in Music
Alex Lacamoire and Bill Sherman for arranging and orchestrating and Lin-Manuel Miranda for lyricising and scoring In the Heights – King's Cross; Kuljit Bhamra and Howard Goodall for orchestrating, Howard Goodall for scoring and Charles Hart for lyricising Bend It Like Beckham – Phoenix; Iestyn Davies, the Musicians and the Singers for performing and Claire van Kampen for arranging Farinelli and the King – Duke of York's; Cyndi Lauper for lyricising and scoring and Stephen Oremus for arranging, orchestrating and music supervising Kinky Boots – Adelphi
Outstanding Achievement in Dance	Best New Dance Production
Alessandra Ferri in Chéri and Woolf Works – Royal Opera House; Javier de Frutos for choreographing Anatomy of a Passing Cloud – Linbury Studio, Royal Opera House; Sasha Waltz for choreographing Sacre – Sadler's Wells	Woolf Works, Wayne McGregor – Royal Opera House; He Who Falls (Celui Qui Tombe), Compagnie Yoann Bourgeois – Barbican; Roméo et Juliette, Les Ballets de Monte Carlo – London Coliseum
Outstanding Achievement in Opera	Best New Opera Production
English National Opera Chorus and Orchestra of The Force of Destiny, Lady Macbeth of Mtsensk and The Queen of Spades – London Coliseum; Felicity Palmer in The Queen of Spades – London Coliseum; Antonio Pappano for conducting Cavalleria rusticana / Pagliacci, Guillaume Tell and Król Roger – Royal Opera House; Tamara Wilson in The Force of Destiny – London Coliseum	Cavalleria rusticana / Pagliacci – Royal Opera House; Morgen und Abend – Royal Opera House; The Force of Destiny – London Coliseum
Outstanding Achievement in Affiliate Theatre
Pat Kinevane for Fishamble for Silent – Soho; Barbarians – Clare, Young Vic; Phil Dunster in Pink Mist – Bush; Violence and Son – Jerwood Upstairs, Royal Court
Audience Award
The Phantom of the Opera – Her Majesty's; Jersey Boys – Piccadilly; Les Misérables – Queen's; Matilda – Cambridge

== Productions with multiple nominations and awards ==
The following 20 productions, including three operas and one dance, received multiple nominations:

- 8: Gypsy
- 7: Kinky Boots
- 6: Farinelli and the King, Guys and Dolls, The Winter's Tale
- 5: Bend It Like Beckham
- 4: Hamlet, In the Heights, Mrs Henderson Presents, Nell Gwynn, Oresteia, People, Places and Things
- 3: The Father, The Force of Destiny, Hangmen
- 2: Cavalleria rusticana / Pagliacci, Les liaisons dangereuses, The Queen of Spades, Seven Brides for Seven Brothers, Woolf Works

The following six productions, including one dance, received multiple awards:

- 4: Gypsy
- 3: In the Heights, Kinky Boots
- 2: Hangmen, People, Places and Things, Woolf Works

== See also ==
- 70th Tony Awards
