= Mrs Henderson Presents =

2005 film by Stephen Frears

- Film poster
- Directed by: Stephen Frears
- Written by: Martin Sherman
- Produced by: Norma Heyman; Bob Hoskins
- Starring: Judi Dench; Bob Hoskins; Kelly Reilly; Will Young; Christopher Guest
- Cinematography: Andrew Dunn
- Edited by: Lucia Zucchetti
- Music by: George Fenton
- Production companies: Pathé; BBC Films; Future Films; Micro-Fusion; UK Film Council
- Distributed by: Pathé Distribution (United Kingdom); The Weinstein Company (United States)
- Release date: 25 November 2005
- Running time: 103 minutes
- Countries: United Kingdom; United States
- Language: English
- Budget: $20 million
- Box office: $27.8 million

Mrs Henderson Presents is a 2005 biographical musical comedy-drama film directed by Stephen Frears and written by Martin Sherman. It stars Judi Dench, Bob Hoskins, Kelly Reilly, and Will Young (in his acting debut). It tells the true story of Laura Henderson, an eccentric British socialite who opened the Windmill Theatre in London in 1931.

Mrs Henderson Presents was theatrically released on 25 November 2005 by Pathé Distribution in the United Kingdom and by The Weinstein Company in the United States. It received generally positive reviews from critics and did moderately well, grossing $27.8 million against its $20 million budget. It received two nominations at the 78th Academy Awards; Best Actress (for Dench) and Best Costume Design (for Sandy Powell).

== Plot ==
Following her husband's death, eccentric 70-year-old widow Mrs Laura Henderson purchases a redundant cinema and remodels it to create the Windmill Theatre in London, as a post-widowhood hobby and appoints autocratic manager Vivian Van Damm. In 1937, they start a continuous variety revue called "Revudeville", but after other theatres copy this innovation, they begin losing money. Mrs Henderson suggests they add female nudity, similar to the Moulin Rouge in Paris, something unprecedented in the United Kingdom. The Lord Chamberlain (Rowland Baring, 2nd Earl of Cromer) reluctantly allows this under the condition that the nude female performers remain immobile, so the performances can be considered art, the equivalent of nude statues in museums.

Because the theatre's auditorium is below street level, it is relatively safe during the bombing of London, and performances continue. The performers bravely go on with the show even during frightening bombing raids, and the posed nude girls resume their poses, after ducking, as the whole theatre is shaken and the scene flats all round them sway when a bomb lands close by.

Maureen, one of the cast, becomes involved at Mrs Henderson's instigation with a young soldier, Paul, one of the audience regulars. Maureen becomes pregnant and receives word that after Paul is demobilised, he intends to return to his girlfriend. She becomes very upset, and hands in her notice. Before further developments, she is killed by a bomb while leaving the theatre.

Other scenes depict life in the theatre during the period. Mrs Henderson and Mr Van Damm frequently clash, but also show great appreciation for each other.

Eventually, the authorities want the theatre to close because of the danger from bombs to crowds gathering outside the theatre. Mrs Henderson successfully argues that for soldiers going to die in the war, this is their last chance, and for many of the young soldiers their only chance, to see naked women. She reflects on the death of her son in the First World War, and how he may never have even seen a naked woman except on a French postcard he had left at home, before going off to war and dying in a gas attack.

The film's closing credits explain that, on her death in 1944, Mrs Henderson bequeathed the theatre to Mr Van Damm.

== Cast ==
- Judi Dench as Laura Henderson
- Bob Hoskins as Vivian Van Damm
- Will Young as Bertie
- Christopher Guest as Lord Cromer
- Kelly Reilly as Maureen
- Toby Jones as Gordon
- Thelma Barlow as Lady Margot Conway
- Anna Brewster as Doris
- Rosalind Halstead as Frances
- Sarah Solemani as Vera
- Natalia Tena as Peggy
- Melody Squire as Millerette
- Sir Thomas Allen as Eric Woodburn
- Richard Syms as Ambrose
- Samuel Barnett as Paul
- Ralph Nossek as Leslie Pearkes

== Reception ==
=== Critical response ===
The film received mostly positive reviews. On Rotten Tomatoes the film has a 68% approval rating based on 142 reviews with an average rating 6.65 out of 10. The site's consensus states: "Judi Dench and Bob Hoskins shine in this warm, witty period piece." Metacritic gave the film a weighted average score of 71 out of 100, based on 36 critics, indicating "generally favorable reviews".

The website Future Movies described the film as "very funny, sweet and charming". Roger Ebert reacted fairly positively to the film, saying "Mrs Henderson Presents is not great cinema, and neither was the Windmill great theater, but they both put on a good show."

=== Accolades ===
The film was nominated for several awards, among them two Academy Awards, four BAFTA Awards, three Golden Globe Awards, and eight British Independent Film Awards.

Award	Category	Nominee(s)	Result	Ref.
Academy Awards	Best Actress	Judi Dench	Nominated	
Academy Awards	Best Costume Design	Sandy Powell	Nominated	
British Academy Film Awards	Best Actress in a Leading Role	Judi Dench	Nominated	
British Academy Film Awards	Best Original Screenplay	Martin Sherman	Nominated	
British Academy Film Awards	Best Costume Design	Sandy Powell	Nominated	
British Academy Film Awards	Best Original Music	George Fenton	Nominated	
British Independent Film Awards	Best British Independent Film	Stephen Frears	Nominated	
British Independent Film Awards	Best Director	Stephen Frears	Nominated	
British Independent Film Awards	Best Actor	Bob Hoskins	Nominated	
British Independent Film Awards	Best Actress	Judi Dench	Nominated	
British Independent Film Awards	Best Supporting Actor/Actress	Kelly Reilly	Nominated	
British Independent Film Awards	Breakthrough Performance	Thelma Barlow	Nominated	
British Independent Film Awards	Best Screenplay	Martin Sherman	Nominated	
British Independent Film Awards	Best Technical Achievement	Sandy Powell (Wardrobe)	Nominated	
Golden Globe Awards	Best Motion Picture – Musical or Comedy	Norma Heyman	Nominated	
Golden Globe Awards	Best Actress in a Motion Picture – Musical or Comedy	Judi Dench	Nominated	
Golden Globe Awards	Best Supporting Actor – Motion Picture	Bob Hoskins	Nominated	
National Board of Review Awards	Best Acting by an Ensemble	Judi Dench, Bob Hoskins, Will Young, Christopher Guest, Kelly Reilly, and Thelma Barlow	Won	

== Stage musical adaptation ==
In June 2014, it was first revealed by producer John Reid that a musical adaptation of the film was in the works, with a workshop taking place the same year. On 16 October 2014, the musical was officially confirmed and it was announced that the show would receive its world premiere in summer 2015, with a view to a West End transfer. The musical is directed by and has a book by Terry Johnson, based on an original screenplay by Martin Sherman, with choreography by Andrew Wright, set design by Tim Shortall, costume design by Paul Wills, lighting by Ben Ormerod and magic consultancy by Scott Penrose. Music by George Fenton and Simon Chamberlain (musical director on the 2005 film) and lyrics by Don Black.

The show's premiere production began previews at the Theatre Royal in Bath, on 15 August 2015, with its official opening night coming on 26 August, for a limited run until 25 September 2015. Rehearsals began on 7 July 2015. On 6 March 2015, initial casting was announced with the news that Janie Dee would play the role of Laura Henderson with Emma Williams playing Maureen. Further notable casting included Ian Bartholomew as Vivian Van Damm and Mark Hadfield as Arthur. On 7 July 2015, it was revealed that Janie Dee had withdrawn from the production prior to rehearsals for personal reasons and that Tracie Bennett would replace her in the role of Laura Henderson.

Following completion of the musical's tryout in Bath, it was announced that the show would transfer to the Noël Coward Theatre in London's West End with an official opening night of 16 February 2016 following previews from 9 February. The majority of the cast reprised their roles with the exceptions of Mark Hadfield, who was replaced in the role of Arthur by former EastEnders actor Jamie Foreman, Graham Hoadly who was replaced (owing to a prior contractual commitment) in the role of Lord Cromer by Robert Hands and Jane Milligan who was replaced in the role of Lady Conway by Liz Ewing.
