= 63rd Golden Globe Awards =

Film award ceremony in 2006

- Date: January 16, 2006
- Site: Beverly Hilton Hotel; Beverly Hills, Los Angeles, California

Highlights
- Best Film: Drama: Brokeback Mountain
- Best Film: Musical or Comedy: Walk the Line
- Best Drama Series: Lost
- Best Musical or Comedy Series: Desperate Housewives
- Best Miniseries or Television movie: Empire Falls
- Most awards: (4) Brokeback Mountain
- Most nominations: (7) Brokeback Mountain

Television coverage
- Network: NBC

The 63rd Golden Globe Awards, honoring the best in film and television for 2005, were presented on January 16, 2006, at the Beverly Hilton Hotel, in Los Angeles, California. The nominations were announced on December 13, 2005.

The ceremony aired on Monday rather than its traditional Sunday after the previous year ceremony's ratings were negatively impacted by the popularity of Desperate Housewives.

== Winners and nominees ==
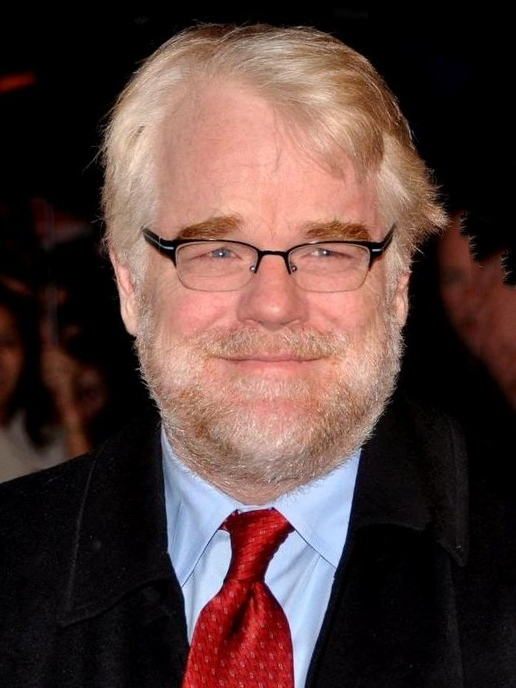
Philip Seymour Hoffman, Best Actor in a Motion Picture – Drama winner

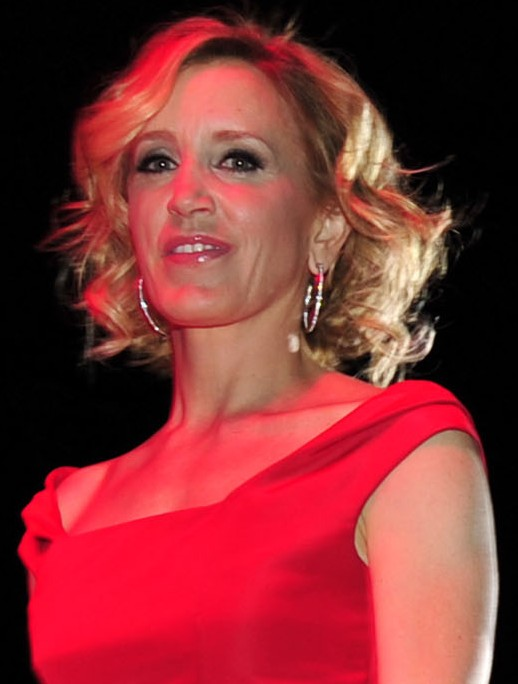
Felicity Huffman, Best Actress in a Motion Picture – Drama winner

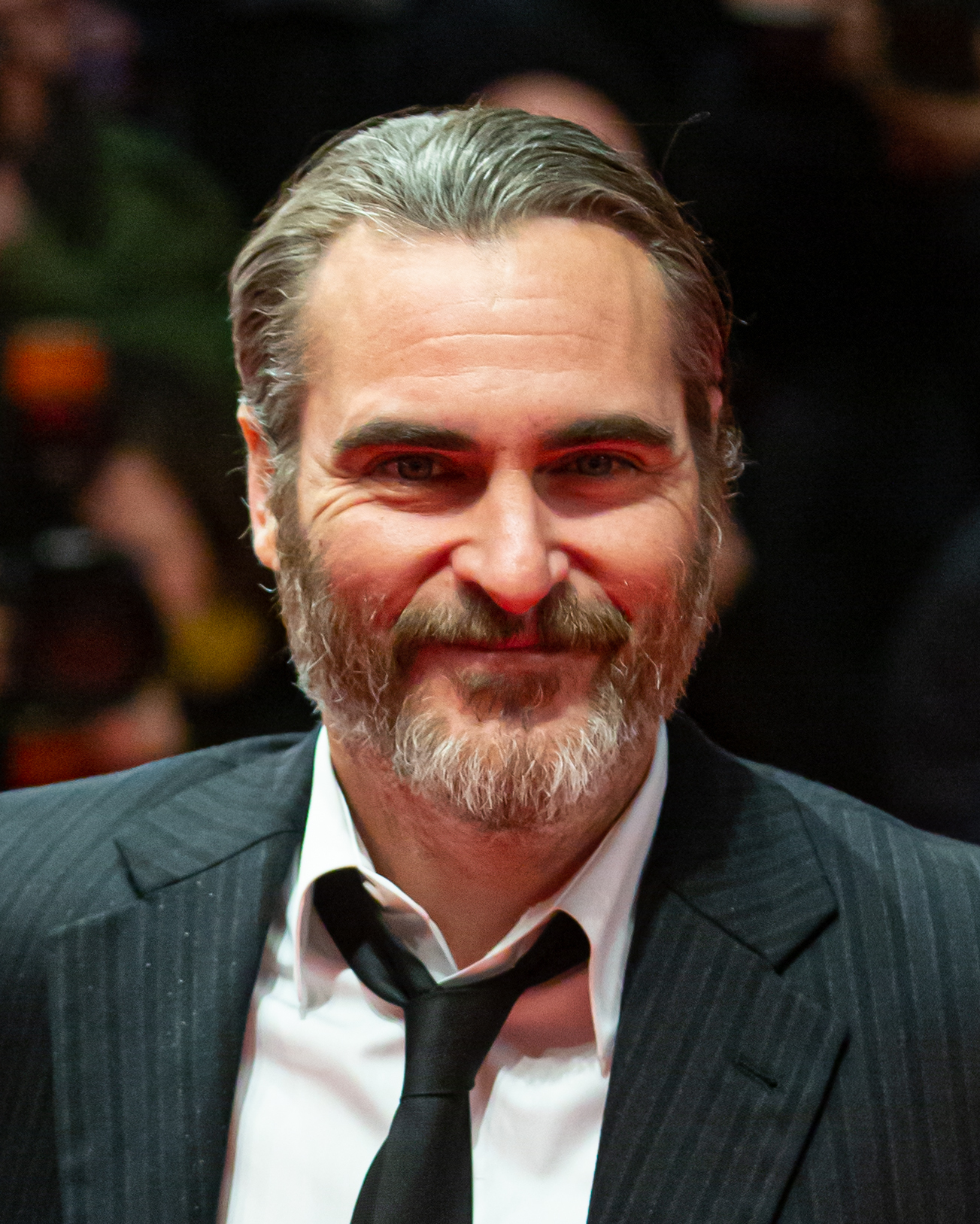
Joaquin Phoenix, Best Actor in a Motion Picture – Musical or Comedy winner

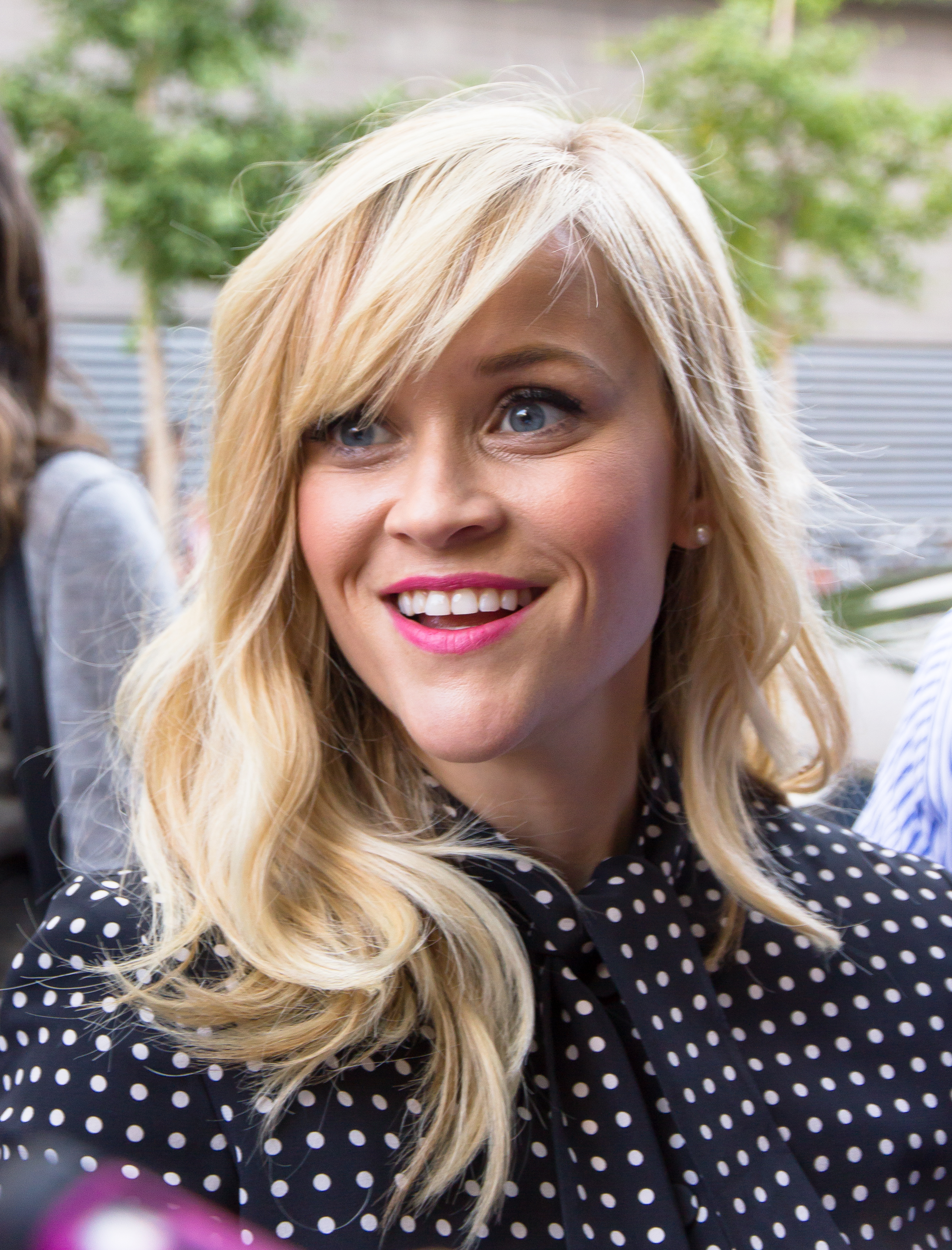
Reese Witherspoon, Best Actress in a Motion Picture – Musical or Comedy winner

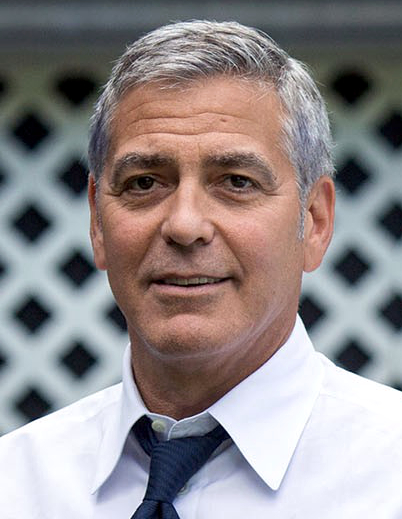
George Clooney, Best Supporting Actor winner

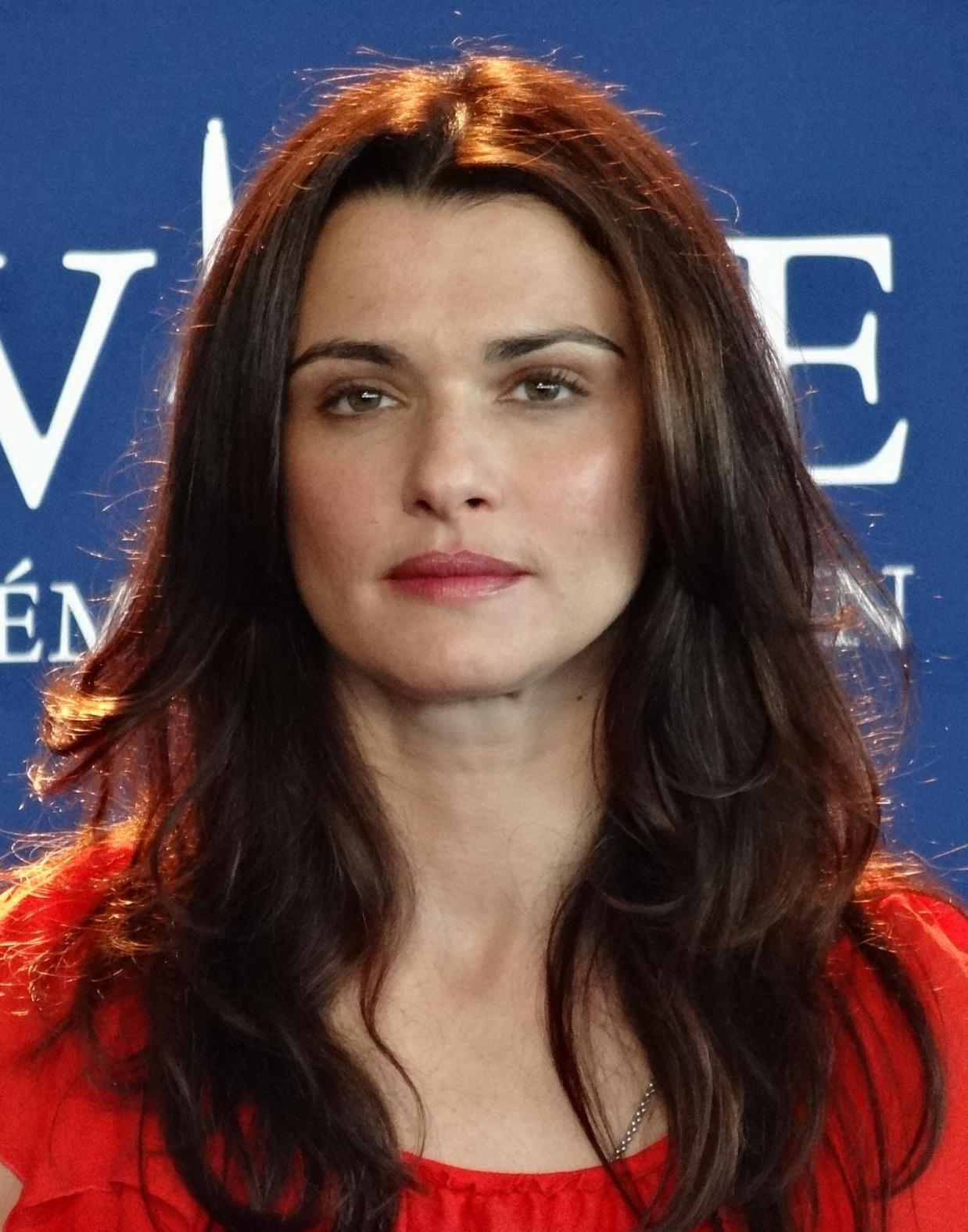
Rachel Weisz, Best Supporting Actress winner

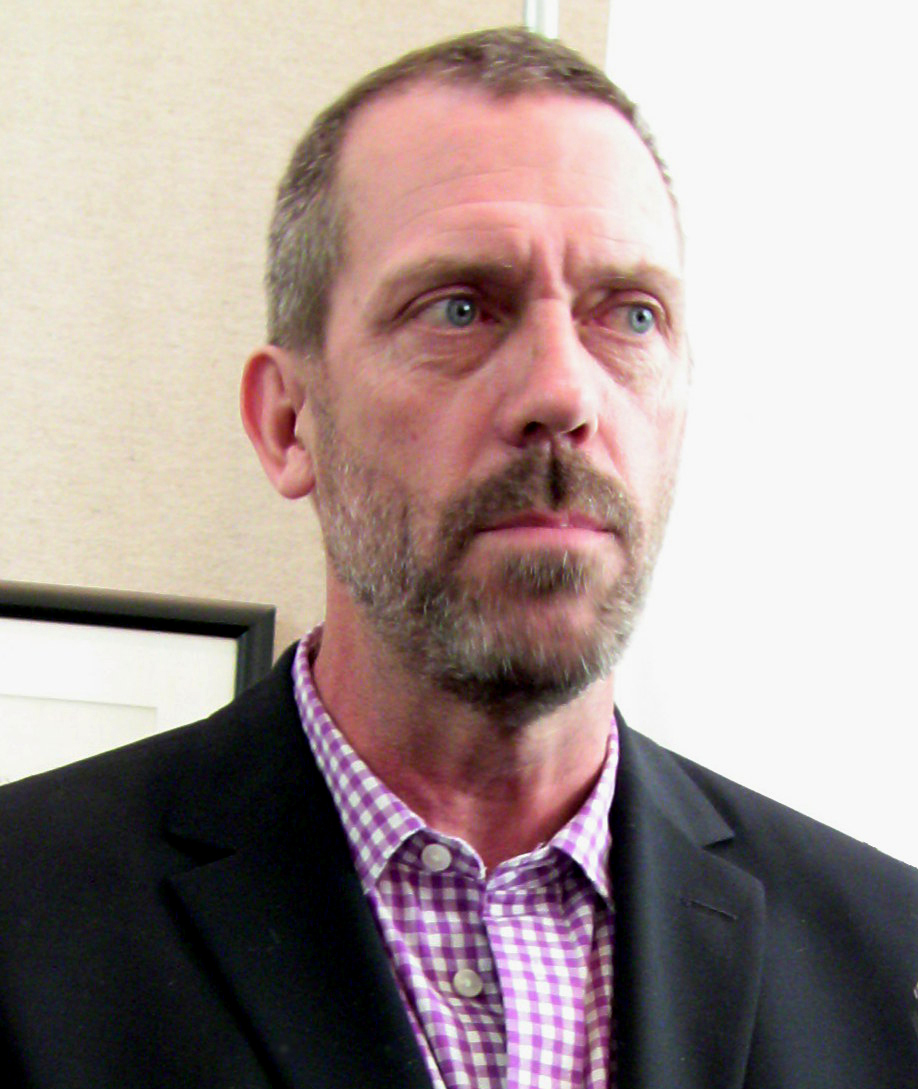
Hugh Laurie, Best Actor in a Television Series – Drama winner

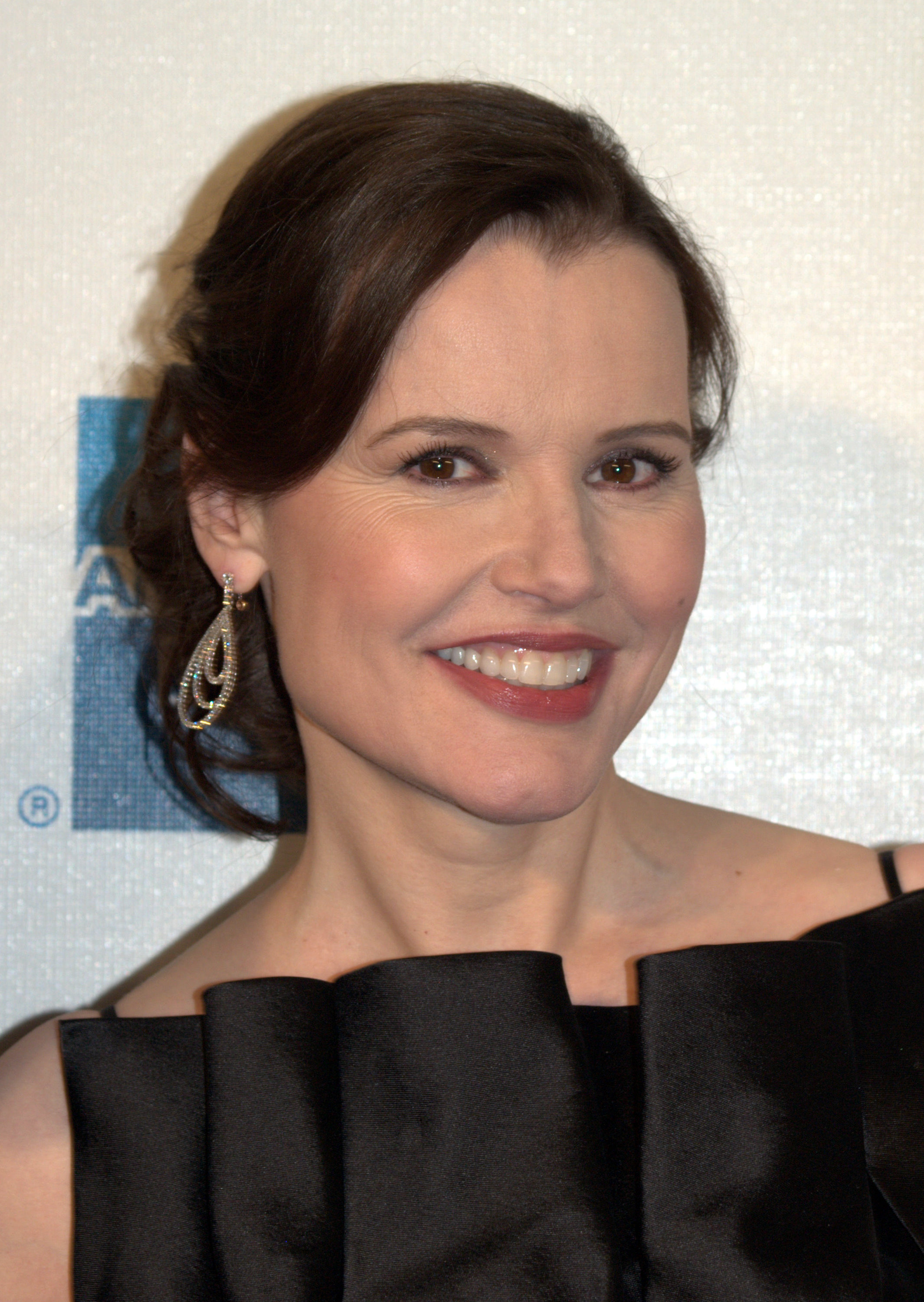
Geena Davis, Best Actress in a Television Series – Drama winner

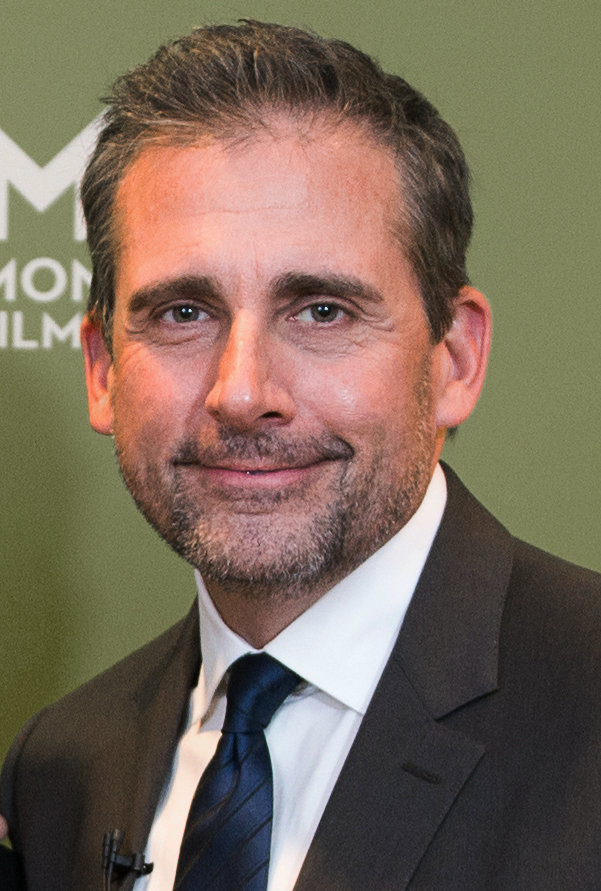
Steve Carell, Best Actor in a Television Series – Musical or Comedy winner

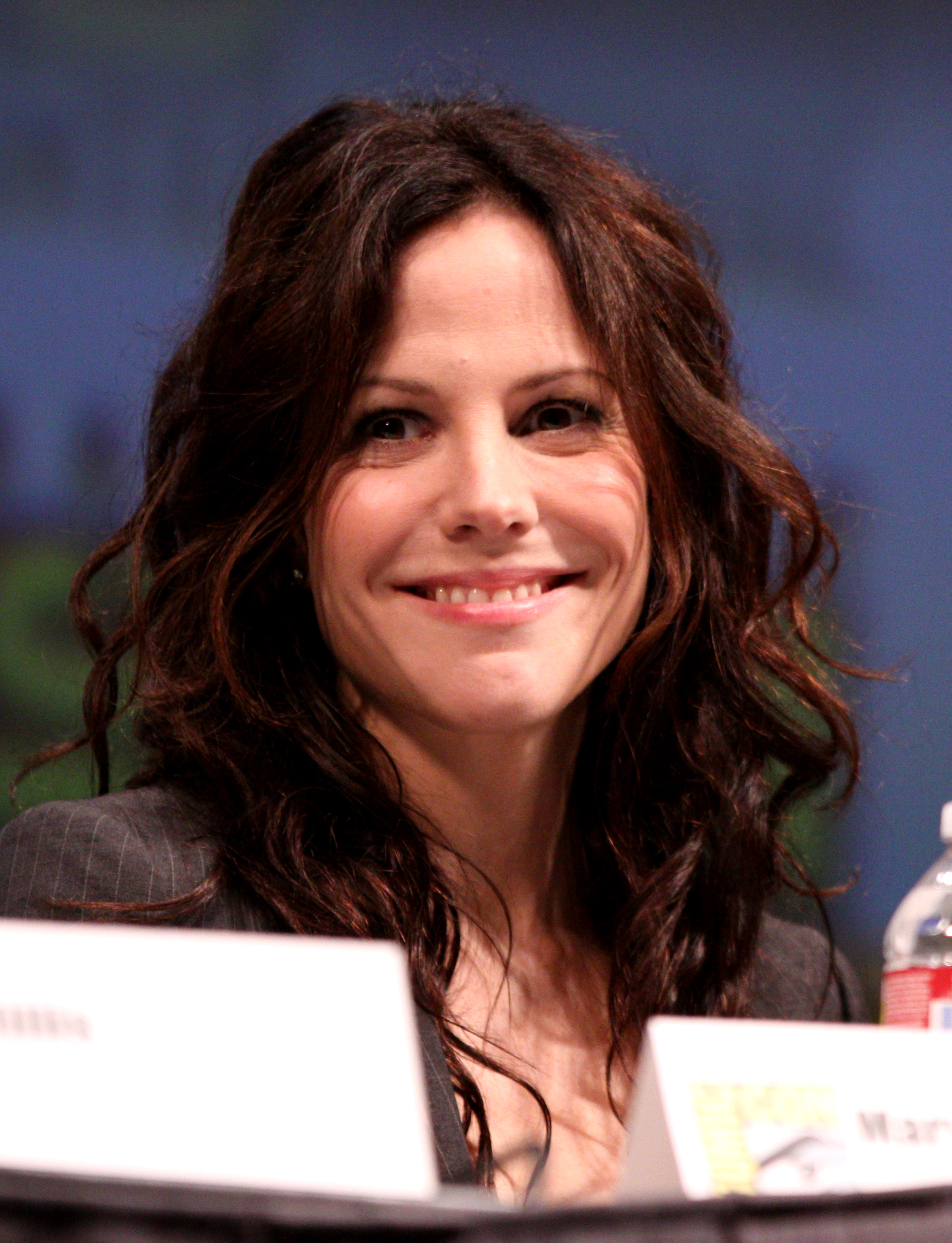
Mary-Louise Parker, Best Actress in a Television Series – Musical or Comedy winner

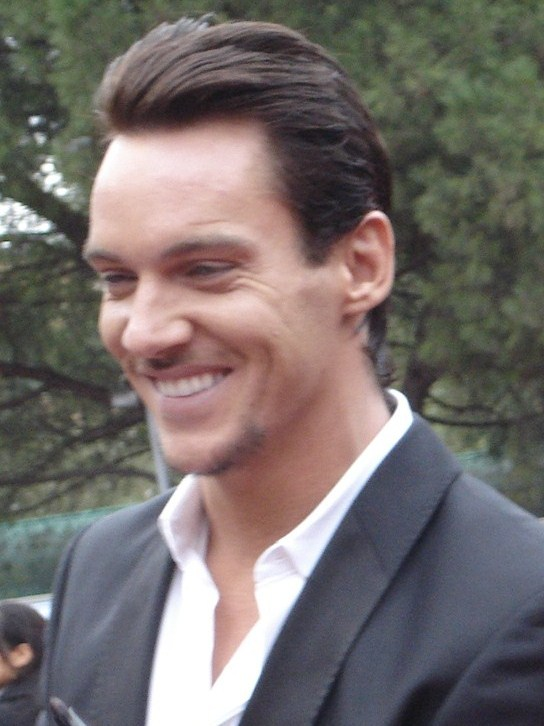
Jonathan Rhys Meyers, Best Actor in a Miniseries or Television Film winner

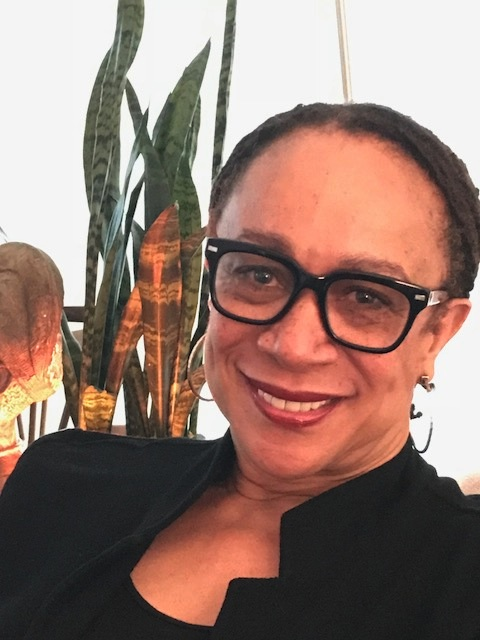
S. Epatha Merkerson, Best Actress in a Miniseries or Television Film winner

Paul Newman, Best Supporting Actor in a Series, Miniseries, or Television Film winner

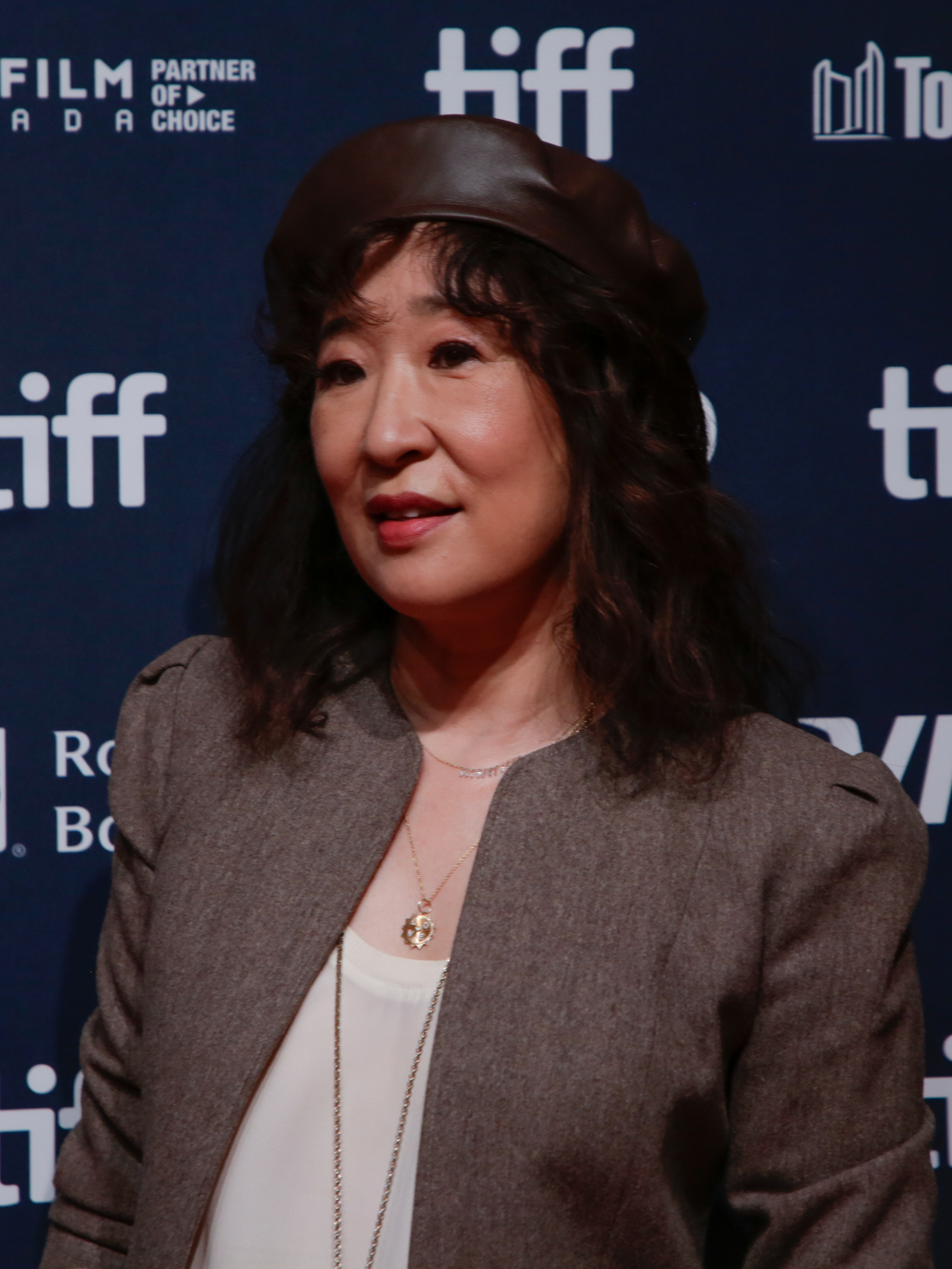
Sandra Oh, Best Supporting Actress in a Series, Miniseries, or Television Film winner

These are the nominees for the 63rd Golden Globe Awards. Winners are listed at the top of each list.

=== Film ===
Best Motion Picture
Drama	Musical or Comedy
Brokeback Mountain; The Constant Gardener; Good Night, and Good Luck.; A History of Violence; Match Point	Walk the Line; Mrs Henderson Presents; Pride & Prejudice; The Producers; The Squid and the Whale
Best Performance in a Motion Picture – Drama
Actor	Actress
Philip Seymour Hoffman – Capote as Truman Capote; Russell Crowe – Cinderella Man as James J. Braddock; Terrence Howard – Hustle & Flow as DJay; Heath Ledger – Brokeback Mountain as Ennis Del Mar; David Strathairn – Good Night, and Good Luck. as Edward R. Murrow	Felicity Huffman – Transamerica as Sabrina "Bree" Osbourne; Maria Bello – A History of Violence as Edie Stall; Gwyneth Paltrow – Proof as Catherine Llewellyn; Charlize Theron – North Country as Josey Aimes; Ziyi Zhang – Memoirs of a Geisha as Chiyo Sakamoto / Sayuri Nitta
Best Performance in a Motion Picture – Musical or Comedy
Actor	Actress
Joaquin Phoenix – Walk the Line as Johnny Cash; Pierce Brosnan – The Matador as Julian Noble; Jeff Daniels – The Squid and the Whale as Bernard Berkman; Johnny Depp – Charlie and the Chocolate Factory as Willy Wonka; Nathan Lane – The Producers as Max Bialystock; Cillian Murphy – Breakfast on Pluto as Patrick / Patricia "Kitten" Braden	Reese Witherspoon – Walk the Line as June Carter Cash; Judi Dench – Mrs Henderson Presents as Laura Henderson; Keira Knightley – Pride & Prejudice as Elizabeth Bennet; Laura Linney – The Squid and the Whale as Joan Berkman; Sarah Jessica Parker – The Family Stone as Meredith Morton
Best Supporting Performance in a Motion Picture – Drama, Musical or Comedy
Supporting Actor	Supporting Actress
George Clooney – Syriana as Bob Barnes; Matt Dillon – Crash as Officer John Ryan; Will Ferrell – The Producers as Franz Liebkind; Paul Giamatti – Cinderella Man as Joe Gould; Bob Hoskins – Mrs Henderson Presents as Vivian Van Damm	Rachel Weisz – The Constant Gardener as Tessa Quayle; Scarlett Johansson – Match Point as Nola Rice; Shirley MacLaine – In Her Shoes as Ella Hirsch; Frances McDormand – North Country as Glory Dodge; Michelle Williams – Brokeback Mountain as Alma Beers Del Mar
Best Director	Best Screenplay
Ang Lee – Brokeback Mountain; Woody Allen – Match Point; George Clooney – Good Night, and Good Luck.; Peter Jackson – King Kong; Fernando Meirelles – The Constant Gardener; Steven Spielberg – Munich	Larry McMurtry and Diana Ossana – Brokeback Mountain; Woody Allen – Match Point; George Clooney and Grant Heslov – Good Night, and Good Luck.; Paul Haggis and Bobby Moresco – Crash; Tony Kushner and Eric Roth – Munich
Best Original Score	Best Original Song
John Williams – Memoirs of a Geisha; Alexandre Desplat – Syriana; Harry Gregson-Williams – The Chronicles of Narnia: The Lion, the Witch and the Wardrobe; James Newton Howard – King Kong; Gustavo Santaolalla – Brokeback Mountain	"A Love That Will Never Grow Old" (Gustavo Santaolalla and Bernie Taupin) – Brokeback Mountain; "Christmas in Love" (Tony Renis and Marva Jan Marrow) – Christmas in Love; "There's Nothing Like a Show on Broadway" (Mel Brooks) – The Producers; "Travelin' Thru" (Dolly Parton) – Transamerica; "Wunderkind" (Alanis Morissette) – The Chronicles of Narnia: The Lion, the Witch and the Wardrobe
Best Foreign Language Film
Paradise Now (Palestine); Kung Fu Hustle (China); Merry Christmas (Joyeux Noël) (France); The Promise (China); Tsotsi (South Africa)

The following films received multiple nominations:

Nominations	Title
7	Brokeback Mountain
4	Good Night, and Good Luck.
4	Match Point
4	The Producers
3	The Constant Gardener
3	Mrs Henderson Presents
3	The Squid and the Whale
3	Walk the Line
2	The Chronicles of Narnia: The Lion, the Witch and the Wardrobe
2	Cinderella Man
2	Crash
2	A History of Violence
2	King Kong
2	Memoirs of a Geisha
2	Munich
2	North Country
2	Pride & Prejudice
2	Syriana
2	Transamerica

The following films received multiple wins:

Wins	Film
4	Brokeback Mountain
3	Walk the Line

=== Television ===
Best Series
Drama	Musical or Comedy
Lost (ABC); Commander in Chief (ABC); Grey's Anatomy (ABC); Prison Break (Fox); Rome (HBO)	Desperate Housewives (ABC); Curb Your Enthusiasm (HBO); Entourage (HBO); Everybody Hates Chris (UPN); My Name Is Earl (NBC); Weeds (Showtime)
Best Performance in a Television Series – Drama
Actor	Actress
Hugh Laurie – House (Fox) as Dr. Gregory House; Patrick Dempsey – Grey's Anatomy (ABC) as Dr. Derek Shepherd; Matthew Fox – Lost (ABC) as Jack Shephard; Wentworth Miller – Prison Break (Fox) as Michael Scofield; Kiefer Sutherland – 24 (Fox) as Jack Bauer	Geena Davis – Commander in Chief (ABC) as President Mackenzie Allen; Patricia Arquette – Medium (NBC) as Allison DuBois; Glenn Close – The Shield (FX) as Capt. Monica Rawling; Kyra Sedgwick – The Closer (TNT) as Deputy Chief Brenda Leigh Johnson; Polly Walker – Rome (HBO) as Atia of the Julii
Best Performance in a Television Series – Musical or Comedy
Actor	Actress
Steve Carell – The Office (NBC) as Michael Scott; Zach Braff – Scrubs (NBC) as Dr. John "J.D." Dorian; Larry David – Curb Your Enthusiasm (HBO) as Larry David; Jason Lee – My Name Is Earl (NBC) as Earl Hickey; Charlie Sheen – Two and a Half Men (CBS) as Charlie Harper	Mary-Louise Parker – Weeds (Showtime) as Nancy Botwin; Marcia Cross – Desperate Housewives (ABC) as Bree Van de Kamp; Teri Hatcher – Desperate Housewives (ABC) as Susan Mayer; Felicity Huffman – Desperate Housewives (ABC) as Lynette Scavo; Eva Longoria – Desperate Housewives (ABC) as Gabrielle Solis
Best Performance in a Miniseries or Television Film
Actor	Actress
Jonathan Rhys Meyers – Elvis (CBS) as Elvis Presley; Kenneth Branagh – Warm Springs (HBO) as Franklin D. Roosevelt; Ed Harris – Empire Falls (HBO) as Miles Roby; Bill Nighy – The Girl in the Café (HBO) as Lawrence; Donald Sutherland – Human Trafficking (Lifetime) as Agent Bill Meehan	S. Epatha Merkerson – Lackawanna Blues (HBO) as Rachel "Nanny" Crosby; Halle Berry – Their Eyes Were Watching God (ABC) as Janie Crawford; Kelly Macdonald – The Girl in the Café (HBO) as Gina; Cynthia Nixon – Warm Springs (HBO) as Eleanor Roosevelt; Mira Sorvino – Human Trafficking (Lifetime) as Agent Kate Morozov / Katya Morozova
Best Supporting Performance in a Series, Miniseries or Television Film
Supporting Actor	Supporting Actress
Paul Newman – Empire Falls (HBO) as Max Roby; Naveen Andrews – Lost (ABC) as Sayid Jarrah; Jeremy Piven – Entourage (HBO) as Ari Gold; Randy Quaid – Elvis (CBS) as Colonel Tom Parker; Donald Sutherland – Commander in Chief (ABC) as Speaker of the House Nathan Templeton	Sandra Oh – Grey's Anatomy (ABC) as Dr. Cristina Yang; Candice Bergen – Boston Legal (ABC) as Shirley Schmidt; Camryn Manheim – Elvis (CBS) as Gladys Presley; Elizabeth Perkins – Weeds (Showtime) as Celia Hodes; Joanne Woodward – Empire Falls (HBO) as Francine Whiting
Best Miniseries or Television Film
Empire Falls (HBO); Into the West (TNT); Lackawanna Blues (HBO); Sleeper Cell (Showtime); Viva Blackpool (BBC America); Warm Springs (HBO)

The following programs received multiple nominations:

Nominations	Title
5	Desperate Housewives
4	Empire Falls
3	Commander in Chief
3	Elvis
3	Grey's Anatomy
3	Lost
3	Warm Springs
3	Weeds
2	Curb Your Enthusiasm
2	Entourage
2	The Girl in the Café
2	Human Trafficking
2	Lackawanna Blues
2	My Name Is Earl
2	Prison Break
2	Rome

The following films and programs received multiple wins:

Wins	Series
2	Empire Falls

== Ceremony ==
=== Presenters ===
- Jessica Alba
- Pamela Anderson
- Eric Bana
- Drew Barrymore
- Kate Beckinsale
- Adrien Brody
- Mariah Carey
- Penélope Cruz
- Rosario Dawson
- Catherine Deneuve
- Leonardo DiCaprio
- Matt Dillon
- Josh Duhamel
- Clint Eastwood
- Colin Firth
- Harrison Ford
- Jamie Foxx
- Melanie Griffith
- Teri Hatcher
- Sean Hayes
- Jill Hennessy
- Evangeline Lilly
- Virginia Madsen
- Jesse L. Martin
- Matthew McConaughey
- Eric McCormack
- Tim McGraw
- Julian McMahon
- Ian McShane
- Debra Messing
- Mandy Moore
- Megan Mullally
- Gwyneth Paltrow
- Sarah Jessica Parker
- William Petersen
- Natalie Portman
- Dennis Quaid
- Queen Latifah
- Tim Robbins
- Chris Rock
- Emmy Rossum
- Brandon Routh
- Nicollette Sheridan
- Hilary Swank
- Emma Thompson
- John Travolta
- Denzel Washington
- Luke Wilson
- Renee Zellweger

=== Cecil B. DeMille Award ===
Anthony Hopkins

== Awards breakdown ==
The following networks received multiple nominations:

Nominations	Network
16	HBO
15	ABC
5	NBC
4	CBS
4	Fox
3	Showtime
2	Lifetime
2	TNT

The following networks received multiple wins:

Wins	Network
2	HBO

== Trivia ==
- "E!" network covered the Golden Globes for six hours prior to the airing of the event.
- At no time during the telecast was a "tribute" made to those in the entertainment industry who have passed on within the past year.

== See also ==
- 78th Academy Awards
- 26th Golden Raspberry Awards
- 12th Screen Actors Guild Awards
- 57th Primetime Emmy Awards
- 58th Primetime Emmy Awards
- 59th British Academy Film Awards
- 60th Tony Awards
- 2005 in film
- 2005 in American television
