= George Frederick Martin =

George Frederick Martin may refer to:

- George Martin (Tasmanian politician) (1876–1946), Australian politician
- George Martin (comedian) (1922–1991), English comedian and broadcaster
