= Mrs Henderson Presents (musical) =

- Theatre Royal, Bath promotional artwork
- Music: George Fenton; Simon Chamberlain
- Lyrics: Don Black
- Book: Terry Johnson
- Setting: 1937 to 1940 London
- Basis: Mrs Henderson Presents by Martin Sherman
- Premiere: 26 August 2015: Theatre Royal, Bath
- Productions: 2015 Bath; 2016 West End; 2017 Toronto

Mrs Henderson Presents is a musical comedy with music by George Fenton and Simon Chamberlain, with lyrics by Don Black and a book by Terry Johnson. Based on the 2005 film Mrs Henderson Presents, the musical received its world premiere at the Theatre Royal, Bath in 2015 and transferred to the West End's Noël Coward Theatre in February 2016. The film was based on the true story of Laura Henderson and London's Windmill Theatre.

== Background ==
The musical is based on the 2005 film Mrs Henderson Presents. The film was based on the true story of London's Windmill Theatre and its owner Laura Henderson, who transformed the theatre and produced Revudeville shows featuring static naked tableaux girls, exploiting a loophole in the Lord Chamberlain's Lord Cromer censorship laws.

In June 2014, it was first revealed by producer John Reid that an adaption was in the works, with a workshop taking place the same year. On 16 October 2014, the musical was officially confirmed and it was announced that the show would receive its world premiere in summer 2015, with a view to a West End transfer. The musical is directed by and has a book by Terry Johnson, based on an original screenplay by Martin Sherman, with choreography by Andrew Wright, set design by Tim Shortall, costume design by Paul Wills, lighting by Ben Ormerod and magic consultancy by Scott Penrose.

== Production history ==
The show's premiere production began previews at the Theatre Royal in Bath, on 15 August 2015, with its official opening night coming on 26 August, for a limited run until 25 September 2015. Rehearsals began on 7 July 2015. On 6 March 2015, initial casting was announced with the news that Janie Dee would play the role of Laura Henderson with Emma Williams playing Maureen. Further notable casting included Ian Bartholomew as Vivian Van Damm and Mark Hadfield as Arthur. On 7 July 2015, it was revealed that Janie Dee had withdrawn from the production prior to rehearsals for personal reasons and that Tracie Bennett would replace her in the role of Laura Henderson.

Following completion of the musicals tryout in Bath, it was announced that the show would transfer to the Noël Coward Theatre in London's West End, with an official opening night of 16 February 2016, following previews from 9 February. The majority of the cast reprised their roles with the exceptions of Mark Hadfield, who was replaced in the role of Arthur by former EastEnders actor Jamie Foreman, Graham Hoadly who (owing to a prior contractual commitment) was replaced in the role of Lord Cromer by Robert Hands and Jane Milligan who was replaced in the role of Lady Conway by Liz Ewing.

The West End show garnered mixed reviews and closed after its initial four-month run. No official reason was given for the close although it is not believed to have been a financial success. In her 2 star review for the Evening Standard, Fiona Mountford stated that the musical "shares with the film a desperate lack of momentum", and of the songs, "none are memorable". In his 4 star review for The Stage, Mark Shenton stated that the show "doesn't shy from occasional hard edges. Instead, by concentrating on the backstage lives of the dancers and management of the Windmill, there's more of a jaunty, frequently patriotic, flavour to it – that both sings and occasionally stings.

On March 15, 2017, the production opened at the Royal Alexandra Theatre in Toronto, Canada where it played a limited engagement until April 23, 2017. The show was essentially recast although Tracie Bennett reprised the role of Mrs Henderson, with the cast also including Peter Polycarpou and Evelyn Hoskins as Maureen.

== Music ==
The musical features an original score composed by George Fenton and Simon Chamberlain, with lyrics by Don Black, orchestrations by Larry Blank, sound design by Gareth Owen and musical direction and vocal arrangements by Mike Dixon.

=== Musical numbers ===
Act I

- "Everybody Loves the Windmill" - Arthur & the Company
- "Mrs Henderson Presents" - Laura Henderson, Vivian Van Damm & the Company
- "Whatever Time I Have" - Laura
- "Lord Chamberlain's Song" - Lord Cormer, Laura & the Secretary
- "What a Waste of a Moon" - Eddie
- "Rubens and Renoir" - Vivian, Doris, Vera & Peggy
- "Ordinary Girl" - Maureen & Laura
- "It Starts With a Dream" - Bertie, Maureen, Doris, Vera, Peggy & the Windmill Girls
- "Perfect Dream" - Maureen, Doris, Vera, Peggy, Laura, Lord Cromer, Lady Conway & the Windmill Girls
- "Living in a Dream World" - Vivian
- "He's Got Another Think Coming" - Bertie, Arthur, Maureen, & the Windmill Girls

Act II

- "'Women at War' Medley" - The Windmill Girls
- "Now is Not the Time" - Vivian
- "Anything But Young" - Laura & Vivian
- "We'll Never Close" - The Company
- "Whatever Time I Have (Reprise)" - Laura
- "What a Waste of a Moon (Reprise)" - Maureen & Eddie
- "Now is Not the Time (Reprise)" - Vivian
- "Innocent Soldier" - The Company
- "If Mountains Were Easy to Climb" - Maureen & Laura
- "We Never Close (Reprise)" - The Company
- "Walkdown" - The Windmill Orchestra

=== Orchestra ===
The musical uses an eight-member orchestra consisting of Keyboard, Woodwind, Trumpet, Drums, Percussion, Double Bass and Cello.

== Principal roles and original cast ==
Character	Theatre Royal Bath performer	West End performer
Laura Henderson	Tracie Bennett	Tracie Bennett
Vivian Van Damm	Ian Bartholomew	Ian Bartholomew
Maureen	Emma Williams	Emma Williams
Arthur	Mark Hadfield	Jamie Foreman
Lord Cromer	Graham Hoadly	Robert Hands
Eddie	Matthew Malthouse	Matthew Malthouse
Bertie	Samuel Holmes	Samuel Holmes
Peggy	Katie Bernstein	Katie Bernstein
Doris	Lizzy Connolly	Lizzy Connolly
Vera	Lauren Hood	Lauren Hood
Lady Conway	Jane Milligan	Liz Ewing
Suzanne	Katrina Kleve	Katrina Kleve
Frank	Alexander Delamere	Alexander Delamere
Cyril	Dickie Wood	Dickie Wood
Spoons	Sam O'Rourke	Sam O'Rourke
Aggie	Julie Armstrong	Tania Newton
Sid	Andrew Bryant	Andrew Bryant
Magician	Neil Stewart	Neil Stewart
Nigel / Lord Cromer's Secretary	Oliver Jackson	Oliver Jackson
Windmill Girls	Sarah Bakker; Rhiannon Chesterman; Victoria Hay	Sarah Bakker; Rhiannon Chesterman; Victoria Hay

== Awards and nominations ==
Year	Award Ceremony	Category	Nominee	Result
2016	Laurence Olivier Awards	Best New Musical		Nominated
2016	Laurence Olivier Awards	Best Actor in a Musical	Ian Bartholomew	Nominated
2016	Laurence Olivier Awards	Best Actress in a Musical	Tracie Bennett	Nominated
2016	Laurence Olivier Awards	Best Actress in a Supporting Role in a Musical	Emma Williams	Nominated
