= Joan Jay =

- Occupations: Singer; dancer
- Employer: Windmill Theatre

Joan Jay was a singer and dancer at the Windmill Theatre in London, from 1936 to 1947. She was seriously injured there during a World War II bombing raid in October 1940, but returned to dancing after receiving skin grafts during a four-month stay in hospital. Her costumes were adapted to hide her scars.

She appeared as a castaway on the BBC Radio programme Desert Island Discs on 19 March 1942, described as a "glamour girl".

Joan Jay was a stage name.

She had two daughters, Vivien (named after the Windmill's manager, Vivian Van Damm), and Janet.
