= Psycho (automaton) =

Psycho was an automaton created by John Nevil Maskelyne with the assistance of John Algernon Clarke and first shown to audiences at The Egyptian Hall, London, in January 1875.

Psycho, fashioned to look like a miniature Indian man, sat cross-legged on a wooden chest. The chest sat on a clear glass cylinder. Under his hand was a rack for thirteen playing cards. The wooden chest he sat on, would be opened and shown that it was much too small to conceal a person.

Psycho would play a game of Whist by moving his hand along the rack of cards in front of him, lifting a card and handing it to Maskelyne.

It was much debated in the press about whether it was a pure mechanical invention or not. Though the exact mechanism for operating Psycho remains unclear, it was like through the use of bellows forcing air up through the glass cylinder. The actual operation of the automaton is thought to have been performed by Maskelyne's stage partner George Cooke. Psycho gave his last performance in 1910 and it was then donated to the London Museum by the Maskelyne family in 1934.

In 1878, Harry Kellar visited England and had a copy of Maskelyne's whist-playing automaton made by Alfred La Mare. Other unauthorized copies of Psycho were made for the likes of Dr Cramer, Ludwig Haselmayer, Charles Arbre and Mr Everett. In 1919 Kellar gave his "Psycho" to Houdini. When Houdini died, Bess Houdini passed the Psycho to Joseph Dunninger who then passed it to Henry Muller. John Gaughan purchased this version of Psycho from Muller and restored it to full working order. This now resides in his private museum in Los Angeles.

A third known surviving example of Psycho which was made by Hamley's in 1882 was restored by Scott Penrose and is performed occasionally.
