= Windmill Theatre =

Theatre and cinema in London's Soho

- 1909 Palais de Luxe; 1910 Windmill ( Logo ) 1931 Windmill Theatre; 1964 Windmill Cinema; 1974 Windmill Theatre; 1982 La Vie en Rose Show Bar; 1986 Paramount City; 2021 The Windmill Soho; 2025 Rhino Windmill & Noxx
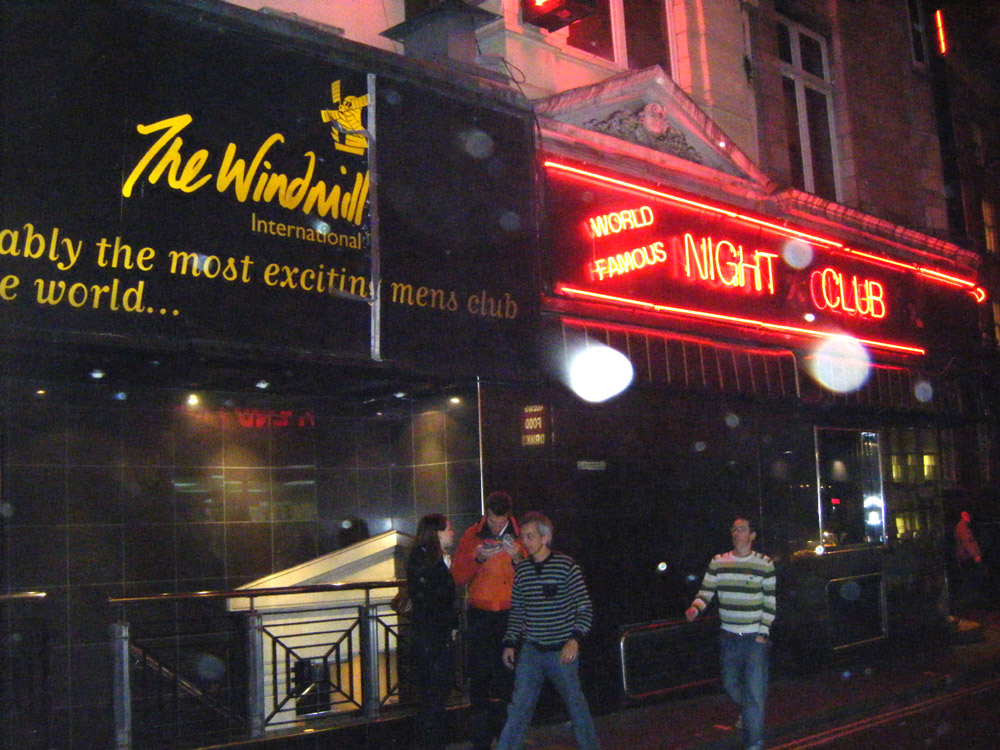
- The Windmill Club in 2009
- Interactive map of Windmill Theatre
- Address: 17-19 Great Windmill Street; Westminster, London
- Coordinates: 51.5113980847922°N 0.1341248230486498°W
- Capacity: 350 (2021)
- Type: Playhouse, variety and nude revue
- Designation: ←
- Current use: 2021.The Windmill Soho. Theatrical Dining

Construction
- Opened: 15 June 1931; 95 years ago
- Closed: 31 October 1964; 61 years ago
- Rebuilt: 2021 Amrit Walia
- Years active: 1931–2021

Website
- www.rhinowindmill.com www.noxxsoho.com

The Windmill Theatre in Great Windmill Street, London, was a variety and revue theatre best known for its nude tableaux vivants, which began in 1932 and lasted until its reversion to a cinema in 1964. Many prominent British comedians of the post-war years started their careers at the theatre.

== As the Palais de Luxe ==
Great Windmill Street took its name from a windmill that stood there from the reign of King Charles II until the late 18th century. In 1909 a cinema, the Palais de Luxe, opened on the site. It stood on the corner of a block of buildings that included the Apollo and Lyric theatres, where Archer Street joined Great Windmill Street, just off Shaftesbury Avenue. The building complex incorporates Piccadilly Buildings, an 1897 building which housed the offices of British Mutoscope and Biograph Company, an early producer of films.

The Palais de Luxe was one of the first places where early silent films were shown. As larger cinemas were opened in the West End, business slowed and the Palais de Luxe was forced to close. It was re-opened briefly by Elsie Cohen in 1929 when it was briefly the first "art cinema" in Britain showing foreign films. Cohen would re-establish the idea at the Academy Cinema in Oxford Street in 1931.

== The Windmill ==
In 1930, after her husband's death, Laura Henderson bought the Palais de Luxe building and hired F. Edward Jones, an architect, to remodel the interior to a small 320-seat, two-tier (stalls and circle) theatre. It was then renamed the Windmill. It opened on 15 June 1931, as a playhouse with a new play by Michael Barringer called Inquest. Its existence as a theatre was short and unprofitable, and it soon returned to screening films, such as The Blue Angel (1930) starring Marlene Dietrich.

Mrs Henderson hired a new theatre manager, Vivian Van Damm, who developed the idea of the Revudeville—a programme of continuous variety that ran from 2:30 pm until 11 pm. They began to put on shows with singers, dancers, showgirls, and specialty numbers. The first Revudeville act opened on 3 February 1932, featuring 18 unknown acts. These continued to be unprofitable; in all, the theatre lost £20,000 in the first four years after its opening.

Amrit Walia, the co-founder, said: "In the 1930s Laura Henderson famously broke conventions and challenged norms to create the famous institution known as the Windmill Theatre".

=== Windmill Girls ===
A breakthrough came when Van Damm began to incorporate glamorous nude females on stage, inspired by the Folies Bergère and Moulin Rouge in Paris. This coup was made possible by convincing Lord Cromer, then Lord Chamberlain, in his position as the censor for all theatrical performances in London, that the display of nudity in theatres was not obscene: since the authorities could not credibly hold nude statues to be morally objectionable, the theatre presented its nudes — the legendary "Windmill Girls" — in motionless poses as living statues or tableaux vivants. The ruling: 'If you move, it's rude.' The Windmill's shows became a huge commercial success, and the Windmill girls took their show on tour to other London and provincial theatres and music halls. The Piccadilly and Pavilion theatres copied the format and ran non-stop shows, reducing the Windmill's attendance.

=== Tableaux vivants ===
Van Damm produced a series of nude tableaux vivants based on themes such as Annie Oakley, mermaids, American Indians, and Britannia. Typically, nude performers would assemble onstage with the curtain down (i.e. out of sight of the audience) and then strike poses before the curtain went up. The performers would then hold those poses, remaining perfectly still until the curtain came down again. Alternatively, a succession of nude performers would stand in the wings on trolleys and be wheeled onstage from the wings by a fully-clothed stage-hand. In all cases the performers themselves had to remain completely motionless, as if they were a statue made of stone or bronze.

Later, movement was introduced in the form of the fan dance, where a naked dancing girl's body was concealed by fans held by herself and four female attendants. At the end of the act the girl would stand stock still, and her attendants would remove the concealing fans to reveal her nudity. The girl would then hold the pose for about ten seconds before the close of the performance. Another way the spirit of the law was evaded, enabling the girl to move, and thus satisfying the demands of the audience, was by moving the props rather than the girls. Ruses such as a technically motionless nude girl holding on to a spinning rope were used. Since the rope was moving rather than the girl, authorities allowed it, even though the girl's body was displayed in motion.

=== "We Never Closed": World War II ===
The theatre's famous motto "We Never Closed" (often humorously modified to "We Never Clothed") was a reference to the fact that the theatre remained open, apart from the compulsory closure that affected all theatres for 13 days (4 to 16 September) in 1939. Performances continued throughout the Second World War even at the height of the Blitz. The showgirls, cast members, and crew moved into the safety of the theatre's two underground floors during some of the worst air attacks, from 7 September 1940 to 11 May 1941.

Many of the Windmill's patrons were families and troops, as well as celebrities who came as Henderson's guests. These high society guests included Princesses Helena Victoria and Marie Louise (granddaughters of Queen Victoria). For a time, on the opening night of every new Windmill show, the Royal Box was always reserved for the Rt. Hon. George Lansbury, a member of His Majesty's Government.

The theatre ran into the occasional problem with male patrons, but security guards were always on the lookout for improper behaviour. One of the more comical off-stage acts was the spectacle of the "Windmill Steeplechase" where, at the end of a show, patrons from the back rows would make a dash over the top of the seats to grab the front rows for the following show.

== Postwar years ==
When Mrs Henderson died on 29 November 1944, aged 82, she left the Windmill to Van Damm. During his tenure, the Windmill was home to numerous famous comedians and actors who had their first real success there, including Jimmy Edwards, Harry Worth, Tony Hancock, Spike Milligan, Harry Secombe, Peter Sellers, Michael Bentine, George Martin, Bruce Forsyth, Arthur English, Tommy Cooper and Barry Cryer. Cryer was "a bottom of the bill" comic at the Windmill, while Forsyth performed as a juvenile performer — a superior post. A number of the most celebrated photographic pin-up models of the 1950s and early 1960s also did a stint as Windmill Girls, including June Palmer, Lyn Shaw, June Wilkinson, and Lorraine Burnett.

Van Damm ran the theatre until his death on 14 December 1960, aged 71. He left the theatre to his daughter, rally driver Sheila Van Damm. She struggled to keep it going, but by this time, London's Soho neighbourhood had become a seedier place. The Soho neighbourhood of the 1930s and 1940s had been a respectable place filled with shops and family restaurants. The Revudeville shows ran from 1932 to 1964, until the Windmill officially closed on 31 October 1964.

=== Windmill Cinema ===
The theatre then changed hands and became the Windmill Cinema (with a casino incorporated in the building), having been bought by the Compton Cinema Group run by Michael Klinger and Tony Tenser. On 2 November 1964, the Windmill Cinema opened with the film Nude Las Vegas. The cinema became part of the Classic Cinema chain in May 1966. On 9 June 1974, the Windmill Cinema closed.

=== 1974 to 2025: Multiple Changes ===
The cinema's lease was bought in February 1974 by nightclub and erotica entrepreneur Paul Raymond. Raymond returned it to a venue for nude shows "à la Revuedeville but without the comic element". The first production at the now renamed Windmill Theatre was a play called Let's Get Laid, which opened on 2 September 1974, and starred Fiona Richmond and John Inman. A nude dance show called Rip-Off was the next production at the theatre; this show commenced on 10 May 1976. Paul Raymond re-introduced burlesque when he renamed the Windmill La Vie en Rose Show Bar and opened the venue as a supper club with a laser disco on 16 November 1982.

The venue became Paramount City in May 1986, a cabaret club managed for a short duration by Debbie Raymond, Paul Raymond's daughter. A period as a television studio followed – the Sky television programme Jameson Tonight was produced in the studio. In 1989, Big Bang performed their Arabic Circus Tour at the Windmill Theatre. Comedian Arthur Smith hosted a television show featuring comedians and music acts, simply called Paramount City, which ran on Saturday nights for two series on BBC One between 1990 and 1991.

In 1994, the former theatre part of the building was leased to Oscar Owide as a Wild West venue which became after a short time an erotic table-dancing club called The Windmill International, run by Oscar Owide and his son Daniel. Until 2009, the Paul Raymond Organisation occupied the Piccadilly Buildings section of the building as their offices. A "gas or electricity explosion" occurred in the male toilets of the Windmill Club on 3 March 2017, causing damage to the adjacent pavement, and leading to a brief evacuation of the building and surrounding area. Oscar Owide died in December 2017. A month later, the Windmill lost its licence because it had been found to have broken the "no touching" requirement between performers and clients.

In May 2021, it was announced that the Windmill would reopen as a 350-seat restaurant and bar, with a cabaret.

=== 2025 to present: Spearmint Rhino ===
In September 2025, Spearmint Rhino acquired the venue and renamed it Rhino Windmill. The club re-opened in March 2026 as an adult entertainment venue, with a separate private members club called Noxx operating in the basement.

== Film and stage depictions ==
There have been five films about or featuring The Windmill:

- Tonight and Every Night (1945), starring Rita Hayworth, was made in Technicolor, based on Leslie Storm's Broadway play Heart of the City. Although the theatre in the film is called "The Music Box", it is a thinly-disguised Windmill, featuring American GIs in attendance during war-torn London, and the theatre's being hit by bombs in the Blitz. The film does not feature a Vivian Van Damm character. However, the theatre is run by May Tolliver, played by Florence Bates — who could be construed as being Mrs Henderson. There is no hint in this film that the theatre featured nudes.
- Murder at the Windmill (1949), called "Mystery at the Burlesque" in the US, is a low-budget exploitation film, and little more than an excuse to feature the Windmill boys and girls performing intercut with a plot about the murder of an attendee. Van Damm auditioned to play himself but was considered "too wooden". It featured marked early appearances for Diana Decker, Jon Pertwee, and Jimmy Edwards. It was the first film for producer Danny Angel, who was married to Van Damm's daughter Betty.
- Time Without Pity (1957). David Graham (Michael Redgrave) enters the theater "Revudeville" (We Never Closed) through the stage door and stands in the wings watching twelve dancing girls in bikinis and headpieces dance. He confronts Agnes Cole (Joan Plowright) about her sister Jennie Cole (Christina Lubicz), another dancer at the Revudeville who has been murdered. A Comedian (Dickie Henderson) introduces some of the can-can girls and does funny walks, while period props (large horse stencils) are visible. Leo McKern, Ann Todd and Peter Cushing co-star.
- Secrets of a Windmill Girl (1966) was even more exploitative. It features the first appearance of Pauline Collins, Martin Jarvis, Dana Gillespie, and some of the former Windmill Theatre dancers including Pat Patterson, Jill Millard, and Sadie Comben.
- Mrs Henderson Presents (2005), a comedy-drama BBC film about the theatre, starring Judi Dench and Bob Hoskins, was critically acclaimed but not a strong commercial success.
- Mrs Henderson Presents (2015), a musical comedy based on the film, which premiered at the Theatre Royal Bath before a short run in the West End.

== Notable performers ==
- Michael Bentine
- Barry Cryer
- Jimmy Edwards
- Arthur English
- Dick Emery
- Bruce Forsyth
- Joan Jay
- Tony Hancock
- Michael Howard
- Jean Kent
- Bill Kerr
- Alfred Marks
- George Martin
- Bill Maynard
- Kenneth More
- Harry Secombe
- Peter Sellers
- Harry Worth
- Ben Loader
- Josie Jones

== See also ==
- List of strip clubs

== Bibliography ==
- Picture Post Vol.9 No.3.19 October 1940."Backstage:1940".
- Life. Vol.12 No.11 16 March 1942 "London's Windmill Theatre".
- Everybody's Weekly .21 December 1946."We Never Closed", by Mackenzie Newham.
- John Bull.31 January 1948."But It's All So British", by Dennis Holman.
- Illustrated.14 August.1948. "Day Trip for the Windmill".
- Illustrated 5 February 1949."Windmill Murder".
- Film and Art Reel. Vol.6 No.1 1949 "Have You Been to the Windmill Theatre?"
- Film and Art Reel. Vol.6 No.2 1949 "Extracts from the Diary of a Windmill Girl", by Pat Raphael.
- Picture Post Vo.30 No.9 2 March 1946."The Windmill Theatre Throws a Party".
- Lilliput Vol.26 No.3 Issue No.153.March.1950."All Change at the Windmill " by David Clayton.
- Picture Post Vol.52 No.3 21 July 1951 "Non Stop Peep Show", by John Chillingworth.
- Illustrated 20 October 1951."Do You See What I See?"
- Everybody's Weekly.7 February 1953."Twenty -One Years of The Windmill", by Bryan Bourne.
- Illustrated 5 May 1956 "Three Goons for the Price of One, The Windmill Story" by Vivian van Damm.
- Radio Times Vol.134 No.1734.1 February 1957."Twenty-Five Years Non-Stop" by Peter Noble.
- London Life, July 1958 Photographs of artistes.
- The London Week What's on in London.17-3-1961."We Never Closed-The Windmill Success Story".
- Modern Man Vol.Xlll No.7-150 January 1964 "Jane Visits London's Breezy Windmill" A U.S. magazine article by Jane Dolinger.
- Fiesta Vol.7 No.4 March 1973 "The Windmill".
- Yours, May 2004 "We Never Closed" A magazine article by Tony Clayton.
- The Soho Clarion, Issue no.136, Spring 2009 "Tonight and Every Night" An article by Maurice Poole.
- Allen Eyles and Keith Skone's: London's West End Cinemas [1984, second edition 1991].
- Earl, John and Sell, Michael Guide to British Theatres 1750-1950, pp. 128 (Theatres Trust, 2000) ISBN 0-7136-5688-3.
- Gavin Weightman Bright Lights, Big City: London Entertained 1830-1950. (Collins and Brown, London 1992)
- Jason: "Blonde and Brunette", Chapman and Hall, London,1940.
- Vivian van Damm: "Tonight and Every Night", Stanley Paul, London, 1952.
- Sheila van Damm: "No Excuses", Putnam, London, 1957.
- Sheila van Damm: "We Never Closed", Robert Hale, London,1967.
- British Pathe films: Various films of Windmill Theatre events.
- BBC Television."Twenty-One Today". London's Windmill Invites you to its twenty-first birthday party, Introduced by Leslie Mitchell. Filmed at the Trocadero Restaurant on 4 February 1953.
- BBC Radio. "The Windmill". A radio programme hosted by Kenneth More. Broadcast made on 4 February 1957 for the silver jubilee of the theatre.
- BBC Television."The Windmill Years Twenty -Five Years Non-Stop". Introduced by Richard Murdoch. Filmed at the Trocadero Restaurant on 4 February 1957.
- BBC Television."This Is Your Life".Ben Fuller the Windmill Theatre Stage Door Keeper.Televised 13 November 1962.
- "Dawn in Piccadilly",1962, Documentary film. The cast includes, George Martin, Dawn Maxey, Pat Patterson, Gina Delrina and Keith Lester.
- British Movietone "We Never Closed", Story No.89002, Released 5 November 1964.
- BBC Television " Panorama": News report produced for the last night of the theatre in 1964. Richard Dimbleby interviews Sheila van Damm, Dickie Grout the Stage Director and Sally Crow a Windmill dancer.
- BBC Television: "If It Moves It's Rude: The Story of The Windmill Theatre", 1969.
- BBC Radio Woman's Hour."The Windmill- Life in a singing and dancing revue". Jean Picton, Pat Stefton and Barry Cryer talk about working at the Windmill Theatre. Broadcast on 25 November 2005
- The 1949 film, "Murder at the Windmill" was titled "Mystery at the Burlesque" in the U.S.A.
- Windmill Theatre Co., Ltd. souvenirs and theatre programmes.
- Zsuzsi Roboz 1964 drawings of Windmill Girls in the Tate Collection.
- Richard Wortley."The Pictorial History of Striptease".Octopus Books Ltd., London,1976.A later edition was by the Treasury Press, London.ISBN 0 907 407 12 9. This book has information about the Windmill Theatre.
- Men Only.October,1976.Rip Off article.
- Men Only.July,1981.Rip Off article.
- Old Theatres magazine. Edition no.6,2010."Revudeville".An article by Maurice Poole.
- Paul Willetts."Members Only-The Life and Times of Paul Raymond". Serpent's Tail Ltd., London. Published August,2010.ISBN 9781846687150.
- Remembering Revudeville - A SOUVENIR OF THE WINDMILL THEATRE compiled by ex Windmill girl Jill Millard Shapiro https://www.amazon.co.uk/Remembering-Revudeville-Souvenir-Windmill-Theatre/dp/0992869609
