= George Martin (comedian) =

English comedian, born 1922

George Martin

George Frederick Martin (26 February 1922 – 4 November 1991) was a British comedian, musician, composer, scriptwriter and broadcaster, often billed as "The Casual Comedian".

== Early days ==
Martin was born in Aldershot, Hampshire, England, with Romany blood on his mother's side. He was an accordion player and singer known as "The Boy Baritone". He also played in The Tango Trio. Martin volunteered for the Royal Air Force in 1940, on his eighteenth birthday, serving as a ground crew technician in Ireland and Canada. Martin developed his performance skills in numerous service productions.

He married Joan Hewitt in 1942 and had three children – Sue (1946), Ray (1947) and Mike (1954). He left the RAF in 1946 and worked for a while as an electrician in Aldershot.

== Early career ==
Martin formed a close harmony trio, The Martin Brothers, with his younger brother, Bill, and his brother-in-law, Bob McGowan (whom he had met in the RAF in Canada). They successfully auditioned for Vivian Van Damm at the Windmill Theatre, London, (on the same day as fellow Aldershot entertainer Arthur English) and turned professional in showbusiness by taking a six-week season. A tour of Scotland followed, then a place in the touring production Buttons and Bows across Germany. Martin broke his leg and the act disbanded, but when Martin recovered, he auditioned again for Van Damm, this time as a solo act. This led to a two-year stint at The Windmill, six shows a day, six days a week, during which time he developed his style as The Casual Comedian. In shirt sleeves, accompanying himself on piano and/or accordion, Martin, with pipe and newspaper in hand, would comment and make jokes about the day's news events. This was an original approach at the time, and he became one of the first topical comedians.

== Established career ==
Leaving the Windmill in 1952, Martin was signed to the Grade Organization, run by brothers Lew Grade and Bernard Delfont, and began performing weekly variety shows all over the country on the Number One circuit for Moss Empires. He also appeared regularly on television and BBC Radio. His first TV series, The George Martin Show was written by Talbot Rothwell (later to write most of the Carry On films) but the format was not right for George and he swore that from then on, he would always write his own material. He quickly became a household name, and worked every top theatre and venue in the country, including performances at the London Palladium and Victoria Palace, supporting the likes of Frank Sinatra and Guy Mitchell.

His pantomime appearances were well received, especially as Buttons in Cinderella, and he wrote many songs for these shows such as "Baby Bear Lullaby" and "Fairy Tale Coach and Pair". The Beverley Sisters recorded his song "The Small Shepherd Boy" on Columbia 4736 in 1961. In 1960 his TV show for Rediffusion, By George, was one of several advertising magazine style programmes – shows which combined the presentation of live acts and light entertainment with advertisement of products. However, a government crackdown, under Lord Pilkington, on what they called "blatant advertising", outlawed such programmes. In the mid-1960s he was also the frontman for a major television advertising campaign for Courage Keg Bitter, in which he appeared in over twenty commercials as a pub landlord.

Becoming the licensee of a pub in Ash, Surrey, The Bricklayer's Arms, Martin briefly considered leaving the entertainment business, but was soon lured back. Although he still performed, mainly in cabaret and as an after dinner speaker, his main occupation from the mid-1960s onwards was as a scriptwriter, largely for other named performers of the day. He wrote for the first TV series of Irish comedian Dave Allen; Tonight with Dave Allen, as well as material for artistes such as Rolf Harris, Jimmy Tarbuck, Paul Daniels, Harry Worth and Tommy Cooper. He became the main writer and ideas man, as well as script and production associate, for renowned magician David Nixon.

When the then unknown legendary fox puppet, Basil Brush, appeared as a weekly guest on The Nixon Line, Martin helped develop the character and subsequently was the sole writer of every Basil Brush show for many years, (throughout the 1960s and 70s). He scripted all sketches, interviews, songs, parodies and wrote the weekly story (e.g. Basil de Farmer and Des.P.Rado). He also wrote for the Krankies, Roger De Courcey and Keith Harris. During this time, he also performed in shows in South Africa with Cyd Charisse, as well as touring the Far East with David Nixon. His long running BBC Radio 2 series, Souvenir, featured guests such as Hollywood film star George Raft.

A prominent member of the showbusiness brotherhood, the Grand Order of Water Rats, Martin worked tirelessly for charity and received every honour the Order could bestow, notably becoming King Rat in 1971.

== Later years ==
Following his divorce from Joan, he married Margaret Mitchell, who had been a leading soprano in the D'Oyly Carte Opera Company. They lived in Maida Vale.

In 1986, whilst writing for a new Keith Harris BBC series, he suffered a massive stroke which robbed him of his speech and left him paralysed on his right side. He spent his last years in The Royal Star and Garter Home, Richmond, Surrey. In 1992, The Water Rats produced an all star variety show in his memory, at the Churchill Theatre Bromley, the proceeds of which went to the home where he had spent his last years. His signature tune was "Spread a Little Happiness" and his catchphrase "Be Lucky".

In April 2012, the biography of his life and career, written by his youngest son, Mike Martin, was published.

=== Selected examples of credits ===
Theatre: Moss Empires, London Palladium, Victoria Palace, Royal Albert Hall

Television (as a performer): The George Martin Show (BBC), Pleasure Boat (BBC) By George (Ad Mag-Rediffusion), Looks Familiar (Thames) – with Denis Norden

BBC Radio: Variety Bandbox, Henry Hall's Guest Night, By George, Souvenir, Worker's Playtime, Start the Week

Television (as a writer): Tonight with Dave Allen (ATV), Nixon at Nine Five (BBC), The Nixon Line (BBC), The David Nixon Show (BBC), David Nixon's Magic Box (Thames), The Basil Brush Show (BBC), Cooper Just Like That (Thames), Crackerjack (BBC), The Keith Harris Show (BBC), Thirty Minutes Worth (Thames).

Films: Dawn in Piccadilly (1962) as presenter of a 17-minute short about the Windmill Theatre.

Recordings: LP record Basil Brush! (EMI) SRS5051 A Starline Original, 1970 – Producer Bob Barratt. (George was heard as Basil's sidekick, performing a monologue and skits with Basil – also included several original Martin compositions and parodies.)

Boom, Boom! The Best of the Original Basil Brush Show: BBC 2001 DVD and Video release (0 044007 856529)
