= Sheila van Damm =

British rally car driver and theatre impresario

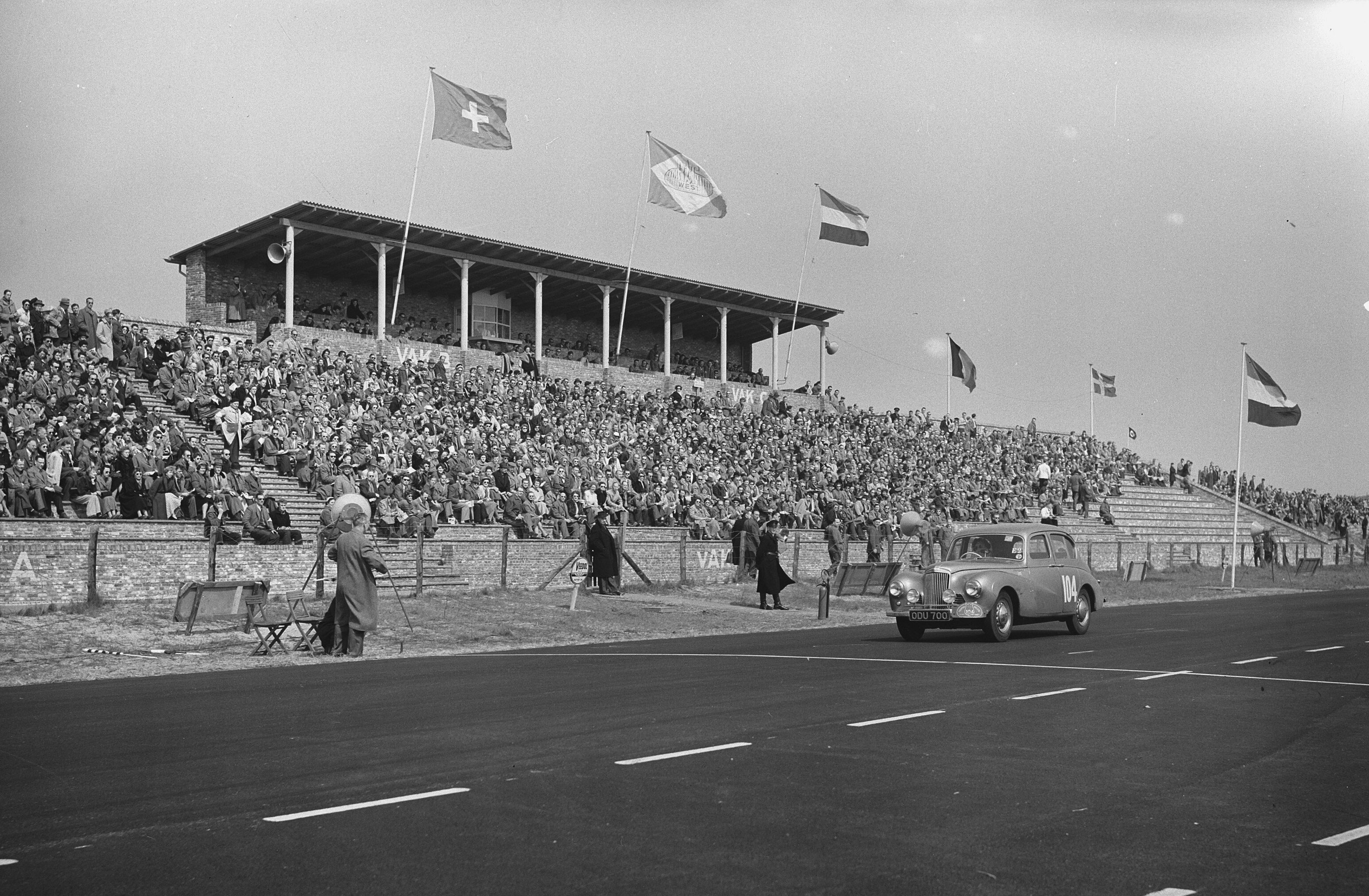
- Sheila van Damm and her co-driver Anne Hall driving a Sunbeam-Talbot 90 during the 1954 Tulip Rally
- Born: January 17, 1922 Paddington, London
- Relatives: Vivian Van Damm (father)
- Teams: Rootes

Sheila Van Damm (17 January 1922 – 23 August 1987) was a British woman competitor in motor rallying in the 1950s, and also the former owner of the Windmill Theatre in London. She began her competitive driving career in 1950, and won the Coupe des Dames, the highest award for women, in the 1953 Alpine Rally. The following year she won the Women's European Touring Championship and, in 1955, the Coupe des Dames at the Monte Carlo Rally.

== Biography ==
Van Damm was born in Paddington, West London, the daughter of Vivian Van Damm and his wife, Natalie Lyons. Her upbringing in a Jewish family was certainly unconventional but then her father was an automobile enthusiast and had been a mechanic with Clement-Talbot in the early days of motoring. He encouraged her to learn to drive, at well below the legal age, and her first journey with him was to drive from London to Brighton. In the Second World War she had more conventional training as a Women's Auxiliary Air Force (WAAF) driver.

While in the WAAF, Van Damm entered her first motor sporting event with her sister Nona as navigator, as a promotional stunt for the Windmill Theatre, which her father managed. With "Windmill Girl" written on the side of the factory-prepared Sunbeam Talbot they finished 3rd in the ladies' section of the MCC-Daily Express car rally. This led to an official Rootes team Hillman Minx in the 1951 Monte Carlo rally.

Van Damm's first major success was the Ladies' Prize in the 1952 Motor Cycling Club rally driving a Sunbeam Talbot. The 1953 Monte Carlo rally was marred by punctures, but she entered the record books with a class speed record for 2–3-litre cars, driving the prototype Sunbeam Alpine sports car at an average of 120 mph (190 km/h) at Jabbeke in Belgium.

In the 1953 Alpine Rally, Van Damm and co-driver Anne Hall won not only the Coupe des Dames, but also a coveted Coupes des Alpes. Another Coupe des Dames in the 1954 Tulip rally of Holland included outright victory in a 10-lap race around the Zandvoort circuit. The ladies' prize in the Viking rally in Norway clinched the 1954 Ladies' European championship for van Damm and Hall – a triumph they repeated in 1955 in a (Rootes-prepared) Sunbeam Alpine Mk. III works team car. Registered RHP 702 and presently in Australia, this is the only one of six original works cars residing outside the UK. Other works cars were driven by racing drivers Leslie Johnson, Peter Collins and Stirling Moss.

Van Damm, Johnson and Moss won the Team Prize in the 1954 Monte Carlo Rally driving Sunbeam-Talbot 90 Mk. IIs. van Damm was in Rootes' Team Prize-winning team again in 1955 and 1956.

The 1956 Monte Carlo rally was her last with Rootes. That year Van Damm partnered Peter Harper in a Sunbeam Rapier in the Mille Miglia road race, winning their class at 66.37 mph (106.81 km/h).

In 1957, Van Damm once more entered the Mille Miglia (its final running), again in a works Sunbeam Rapier, this time partnered by David Humphrey. However, they did not finish, losing control on treacherous tramlines and hitting a shop window.

After retirement from racing, Van Damm became president of the Doghouse Club for motor racing wives and ladies, and president of the Sunbeam Talbot Alpine Register.

Van Damm had worked with her father at the Windmill Theatre from her teens. He inherited it in 1944, and left it to her on his death in 1960. But the changing nature of Soho in London caused it to close in 1964. In 1965, Van Damm toured the Tivoli Circuit Theatres in Sydney and Melbourne, Australia, with her show, "The Windmill Revue". The show featured a number of former Windmill Theatre artistes. This in turn led her to retire with her sister to their small farm in Pulborough in Sussex. She died in London on 23 August 1987.

== See also ==
- List of select Jewish racing drivers
