= Scott Penrose =

English magician and magic consultant

Scott Penrose (born 1969 in Essex) is an English magician and magic consultant and is the son of magician John Penrose.

== The Magic Circle ==
Penrose is a former President of The Magic Circle having been proposed for the post by Paul Daniels. He is Honorary Vice President of The British Magic Society, the UK's oldest Magic Club. He was awarded the title The Magic Circle Stage Magician of the Year in 2000.

As a former Executive Curator of The Magic Circle Museum, Penrose is also a magic historian and is known for his historical recreations and restoration of classics such as the Robert-Houdin Orange Tree, Maskelyne's Psycho Automaton and Devant's Educated Goldfish.

== Film and television ==
He mainly works as a magic consultant and illusion designer. He taught Woody Allen magic for his movie Scoop and advised on the Houdini movie Death Defying Acts (starring Catherine Zeta-Jones and Guy Pearce). He also built illusions for and appeared in the movie Magicians and tutored Sir Michael Caine and the young Bill Milner for the movie Is Anybody There?. Other credits include designing, creating and building magic and illusions for UK TV shows such as QI, Jonathan Creek and Hustle. In the 2015 Christmas Special of QI, Penrose surprised Stephen Fry with membership of The Magic Circle. He had earlier appeared on QI in 2010 to perform the trick of pulling the head off a dove.

Penrose also made the magical effects for the 2019 film adaptation of Andrew Lloyd Webber's musical Cats.

== Theatre ==
For live theatre he has created illusion based special effects for the West End and UK Tour of Spamalot, Ghost Stories, The Ladykillers, I Can't Sing! The X Factor Musical, Bend It Like Beckham the Musical, Mrs Henderson Presents and the stage adaptation of The Tiger Who Came to Tea. In 2007 he created and advised on magic effects, illusions and quick change costume techniques for the Cirque du Soleil touring production "Koozå". Penrose is associated with Andrew Lloyd Webber and made the magical effects for his musical Love Never Dies

He has been described as "The epitome of the professional magician. Think top hat and tails. Think silks, doves and disappearing candles and you will know exactly who I am talking about."

== Writing ==
His literary contributions include illustrating and co-authoring the book Alan Shaxon - The Sophisticated Sorcerer.

== Personal life ==
UK singer Paloma Faith used to be Penrose's assistant in his illusion act before she rose to fame as a performer in her own right. Penrose later played the part of Faith's husband in the video for her song "Smoke and Mirrors".
