= Robert Hands =

British actor

- Born: England, United Kingdom
- Occupation: Film / television actor

Robert Hands is a British actor based in London. He trained at the Bristol Old Vic theatre school. His career has spanned over twenty years during which time he has played leading roles in film, television, and both classical and musical theatre in London's West End. He played Sir Robin in the original London cast of Spamalot.

He is probably best known for his television roles in Sharpe's Battle, Doctor Who and The House of Eliott, as well as the films Charlotte Gray, Anna and the King, and the Shine. He is also a member of Edward Hall's all-male Shakespeare company Propeller.

From 2019 to 2020, Hands was in the UK cast of Come From Away.

== Acting credits ==
=== Theatre ===
| Year | Title | Role | Venue |
|---|---|---|---|
| 1989 | The Wars of the Roses | John of Lancaster | Old Vic |
| 1990 | Invisible Friends | Chuck | National Theatre |
| 1991 | Walpurgis Night | Stasik | Gate Theatre |
| 1992 | As You Like It | Orlando | Greenwich Theatre |
| 1992 | Valentine's Day | Philip Clandon | Gielgud Theatre |
| 1995 | The Importance of Being Earnest | Algernon | Old Vic |
| 1996 | A View from the Bridge | Rodolpho | Greenwich Theatre |
| 1997 | A Midsummer Night's Dream | Puck | Open Air Theatre, Regent's Park |
| 1997 | Troilus and Cressida | Troilus | Open Air Theatre, Regent's Park |
| 1997 | The Woman in Black | Arthur Kipps | Fortune Theatre |
| 2002 | Rose Rage | Queen Margaret | Theatre Royal Haymarket |
| 2002 | Lady Windermere's Fan | Cecil Graham | Theatre Royal Haymarket |
| 2003 | A Midsummer Night's Dream | Helena | Comedy Theatre |
| 2004 | Mamma Mia! | Harry Bright | Prince Edward Theatre and Prince of Wales Theatre |
| 2005 | Chicago | Amos | Adelphi Theatre |
| 2006 | Schumann Plan | Bill Bretherton | Hampstead Theatre |
| 2007–2008 | Spamalot | Sir Robin | Palace Theatre |
| 2016 | Mrs Henderson Presents | Lord Cromer | Noël Coward Theatre |
| 2018 | Her Naked Skin | William Cain | Salisbury Playhouse |
| 2018–2020, 2022 | Come From Away | Doug, Nick Marson and Others | Phoenix Theatre |
| 2025-Present | Cabaret at the Kit Kat Club | Herr Schultz | Playhouse Theatre |

=== Television ===
| Year | Title | Role | Notes |
|---|---|---|---|
| 1990–1991 | The Ruth Rendell Mysteries | PC Stevens | Episodes: "Some Lie and Some Die: Part One", "Achilles Heel" |
| 1992 | Grange Hill | Piers Coveney | Episodes: #15.17 - #15.20 |
| 1993 | Heartbeat | James Lessor | Episode: "Going Home" |
| 1993 | The Bill | Frankie Wade | Episode: "#9.9 On The Cards" |
| 1994 | The House of Eliott | Miles Bannister | Episodes: #3.2 - #3.10 |
| 1995 | Sharpe's Battle | Lt. Jenkins | |
| 1995 | The Vet | Simon Dunning | Episode: "White Lies" |
| 1997 | Peak Practice | Terry Summerscale | Episode: "Fight or Flight" |
| 1999 | The Dark Room | Miles Kingsley | |
| 2003 | Killing Hitler | Lieutenant Col. Ronald H. Thornley | |
| 2003 | Heartbeat | Barry Lee | Episode: "Missing in Action" |
| 2005 | Doctor Who | Algy | Episodes: "The Empty Child", "The Doctor Dances" |
| 2010 | Casualty | Richard Crawley | Episodes: "English Beauty" |
| 2015, 2017 | EastEnders | Mr Colin McWerther | |
| 2018 | Dark Heart | Nico Kashell | |
| 2018 | Berlin Station | Diver | |
| 2019 | Endeavour | Eric Gidby | |
| 2019 | Breeders | Eric | |
| 2022 | Noughts + Crosses | Clem Haines | |
| 2024 | Masters of the Air | Major Gustav Simoleit | |

=== Film ===
| Year | Title | Role | Notes |
|---|---|---|---|
| 1993 | Foreign Affairs | David Hewson | |
| 1996 | Shine | Robert | |
| 1999 | Anna and the King | Captain Blake | |
| 2001 | Charlotte Gray | Borowski | |
| 2002 | Pure | Doctor | |
| 2015 | The Lesson | Mr. Gale | |

== See also ==
- List of British actors
