= Mark Hadfield =

British actor

- Born: 21 December 1959 (age 66)
- Occupation: Actor
- Years active: 1983–present

Mark Hadfield is an English actor.

Before starting his professional career, Hadfield trained at the Royal Academy of Dramatic Art (RADA).

== Career ==
=== Theatre ===
Hadfield's work in theatre includes:

- Thérèse Raquin (for which he received an Olivier Award nomination for Best Supporting Actor)
- Le Bourgeois Gentilhomme
- A Midsummer Night's Dream and The Hour We Knew Nothing of Each Other at the National Theatre, London;
- The Canterbury Tales
- Jubilee
- Twelfth Night
- A Midsummer Night's Dream
- The Seagull
- The Two Gentlemen of Verona
- Bartholomew Fair
- Talk of the City
- The Comedy of Errors
- Hamlet
- The Plain Dealer
- The Plantagenets and Kissing The Pope for the RSC
- A Night at the Dogs at the Soho Theatre, London
- By Many Wounds and Cracked at Hampstead Theatre, London
- Romeo and Juliet at the Lyric Hammersmith, London
- The Twilight of the Golds at the Arts Theatre, London
- Blockheads at the Mermaid Theatre, London
- The Danube and Amphitryon at the Gate Theatre, London
- Child of the Snow
- Two's Company and Tom Foolery at Bristol Old Vic
- The 39 Steps
- The Plough and the Stars and Peter Pan at West Yorkshire Playhouse, Leeds
- Man and Superman and Don Juan for the Peter Hall Company at the Theatre Royal, Bath
- A Midsummer Night's Dream in Stoke
- Savage Amusement at Derby Playhouse
- One Flew Over the Cuckoo's Nest and Macbeth at the Belgrade Theatre, Coventry
- Anything Goes at the Crucible Theatre, Sheffield
- Donkey's Years national UK tour and The Lion King
- Snoopy!!! The Musical
- An Italian Straw Hat and Much Ado About Nothing in the West End, London.
- Into the Woods at Open Air Theatre, Regent's Park
- Jeeves and Wooster in Perfect Nonsense, at Duke of York's Theatre, London
- Made in Dagenham, at Adelphi Theatre, London
- Mrs Henderson Presents, at Theatre Royal, Bath
- Pinocchio, at National Theatre, London
- The Popinjay Cavalier, at Phoenix Theatre, West End

=== Television ===
Hadfield's television credits include:

- Foyle's War
- Casualty
- Holby City
- The Bill
- Headless
- Rhona
- The Vice
- The Wyvern Mystery
- Cold War
- People Like Us
- Crown Court
- Butterflies
- Last Song
- Pig Sty
- Van der Valk
- Cracker
- Wallander
- Outlander (Series 3)

=== Film ===
In film, he has appeared in: Dummy, A Cock and Bull Story, Felicia's Journey, In the Bleak Midwinter, Mary Shelley's Frankenstein, Century, Just Like a Woman and Belfast. He also appeared in the Heineken Adverts with Sylvestra Le Touzel (Water in Majorca).

=== Radio ===
Hadfield's radio appearances include: A High Wind in Jamaica, The Trial of Ruth Ellis, Talk of the City and Fungus the Bogeyman.
