= Laura Henderson =

British theatre manager (1863–1944)

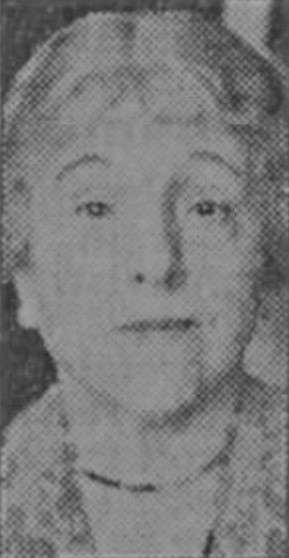
- Laura Henderson, 1944
- Born: Laura Forster; 6 December 1863; St Thomas, Southwark, London
- Died: 29 November 1944 (aged 80); Marylebone, London
- Spouse: Robert Stewart Henderson (m. 1887–1919)
- Children: 1

Laura Henderson (6 December 1863 – 29 November 1944) born Laura Forster, rose to prominence during the 1930s when, as a wealthy and eccentric widow, she founded the Windmill Theatre in London's Great Windmill Street, in partnership with Vivian van Damm. Under the leadership of Henderson, as owner, and van Damm as manager, the theatre became a British institution, famed for its pioneering tableaux vivants of motionless female nudity, and for having "never closed" during the Blitz.

At the time of her death in 1944, newspapers described her as "the mother of non-stop variety in London."

== Biography ==
Laura Henderson was the well-travelled socialite wife of a jute merchant, Robert Stewart Henderson, whom she had married in London on 26 April 1887. The couple lost their only son, Alec Henderson, in 1915, in France, during the First World War. Her husband died in 1919 with an estate valued at £82,913 19s. 9d. (the equivalent of £3.6 million in 2024), leaving her a wealthy widow.

In 1931, she bought the Palais de Luxe cinema building and hired architect Howard Jones to restyle the interior to create a tiny, one-tier theatre, renamed the Windmill. The Windmill Theatre opened on 22 June 1931 as a playhouse, but it was not profitable and soon returned to showing films. Henderson then hired Vivian Van Damm, and they produced Revudeville, a programme of continuous variety with eighteen entertainment acts. This also was a commercial failure. Henderson reportedly lost £26,000 during the theatre's early operation.

They then included nudity to their staging to emulate the Folies Bergère and the Moulin Rouge in Paris. The key element was Van Damm's exploitation of a legal loophole (or zone of tolerance) that nude statues could not be banned on moral grounds, and this led to the legendary "Windmill Girls" who appeared completely nude but stood completely still, so as to emulate nude statuary. The theatre stayed open during World War II despite demands from the government for her to shut it down.

== Death ==
Upon her death on 30 November 1944, Henderson bequeathed the Windmill to "My Dear Bop", Vivian Van Damm. In his 1952 autobiography, Van Damm described her as "a great strain on one's nerves, patience and tact".

== In popular culture ==
Laura Henderson was portrayed by Judi Dench in the 2005 film Mrs Henderson Presents, for which Dench was nominated for the Academy Award for Best Actress. The film was later adapted into a stage musical.

In 2016, Henderson was portrayed by Tracie Bennett in the stage adaptation of the film, which opened at the Noël Coward Theatre.
