= Tracie Bennett =

British actress (born 1961)

- Born: 17 June 1961 (age 65); Leigh, Lancashire, England
- Education: Italia Conti Academy of Theatre Arts
- Occupation: Actress
- Years active: 1981–present
- Notable work: Coronation Street (1982–1984, 1999, 2021)

Tracie Bennett (born 17 June 1961) is an English singer and stage and television actress. She trained at the Italia Conti Academy of Theatre Arts in Clapham, London. She played the role of Sharon Gaskell in Coronation Street from 1982 to 1984, returning to the role in 1999 and again in 2021.

Best known for her roles in theatre, both dramatic and musical, Bennett has received two Olivier Awards for Best Supporting Role in a Musical for her performances in the musicals She Loves Me and Hairspray with additional nominations for her work in High Society and Follies. Bennett was also nominated for the Olivier Award for Best Actress in a Musical for Mrs Henderson Presents while her performance as Judy Garland in End of the Rainbow earned her an Olivier nomination for Best Actress in a Play and a Tony Award nomination in the same category when the production transferred to Broadway.

== Career ==
Bennett's first major television role was in Coronation Street between 1982 and 1984 as Sharon Gaskell, the Faircloughs' foster daughter. She returned to the role in 1999. She played dim-witted blonde Tracy Glazebrook in the pilot of Steven Moffat's sitcom Joking Apart (1991), a role which she reprised for the subsequent two full-length series in 1993 and 1995. She played Shirley's rebellious daughter Millandra in the film version of Shirley Valentine (1989). She appeared in She Loves Me at the Savoy Theatre in 1994, for which she won the Laurence Olivier Award as Best Supporting Performance in a Musical. She played Ida in Honk!, which won the 2000 Olivier Award for Best Musical.

In 2003, she was praised for her role in the London production of High Society, for which she was nominated for an Olivier Award in 2004. She appeared in Sex, Chips and Rock 'n' Roll at the Royal Exchange Theatre in Manchester in 2005, for which she won a TMA Award for Best Supporting Performance in a Musical. In January 2006, Bennett joined the West End production of Les Misérables in the role of Madame Thénardier at the Queen's Theatre, which she continued to play to July 2007. In October 2007, she began her run in the role of Velma Von Tussle in the London premiere of the musical Hairspray at the Shaftesbury Theatre. She mentioned on a televised interview Alan Titchmarsh that it was a "great show" and that she enjoyed doing it, but also said it was exhausting, pointing out that to begin with, the wiring under her wig weighs 10 lbs, making some of the dancing difficult. In spite of this, her efforts were rewarded in March 2008, when she received her second Olivier Award for Best Supporting Performance in a Musical for her performance.

In February 2010, Bennett took on the role of Judy Garland in the first London production of Peter Quilter's play End of the Rainbow. The production premiered with at Northampton's Royal Theatre, and subsequently transferred to London's West End. Bennett received an Olivier Award nomination for Best Actress for her performance. The production transferred to Broadway in March 2012, with Bennett reprising her role. For her performance in the Broadway production, Bennett received a Tony Award nomination for Best Leading Actress in a Play, and won the Outer Critics Circle Award and Drama Desk Award for Outstanding Actress in a Play. In 2013, she joined the cast of detective series Scott & Bailey as Sharon, the estranged mother of DC Bailey. In 2015 and 2016, she played Laura Henderson in the musical Mrs Henderson Presents and received a nomination for the Olivier Awards 2016 in the category Best Actress in a Musical.

Between 2014 and 2017 she played patient Molly Drover in the BBC medical drama, Casualty. In 2017, she played the role of Carlotta in the National Theatre production of Follies by Stephen Sondheim, singing the song "I'm Still Here". In March 2021, it was announced that Bennett would be returning to Coronation Street reprising her role as Sharon Bentley after 22 years away.

== Filmography ==
=== Film ===
Year	Title	Role	Notes
1986	Knights & Emeralds	Tina	
1989	Shirley Valentine	Millandra	
2002	f2point8	Kika	Short film
2004	French Fries on the Golden Front	Princess	Short film
2017	Gholam	Mrs. X	
2017	National Theatre Live: Follies	Carlotta Campion	
2019	Ruthless! The Musical	Lita Encore	
2021	The Extinction of Fireflies	Charlotte	
2025	From the World of John Wick: Ballerina	Muriel	

=== Television ===
Year	Title	Role	Notes
1981	Going Out	Quacky	Episode: "Sixth Week"
1982–1984, 1999, 2021	Coronation Street	Sharon Bentley (née Gaskell)	Series regular, 145 episodes
1984	Danger: Marmalade at Work	Kid from Shame	Episode: "Shame"
1985	Relative Strangers	Lorraine	Episode: "Series 1, Episode 6"
1985	Black Silk	Trish	Episode: "Open and Shut"
1986	Boon	Patsy	Episode: "Glasshouse People"
1986	Unnatural Causes	Cheryl	Episode: "Partners"
1987	The Ritz	Angie	Recurring role, 3 episodes
1987	Brush Strokes	Miss Wilson	Episode: "Series 2, Episode 6"
1987	The Bretts	Connie	Episode: "Forbidden Fruit"
1989–1991	Making Out	Norma	Series regular, 24 episodes
1990	The Ruth Rendell Mysteries	Marilyn Thompson	Episode: "The Best Man to Die"
1991	Rich Tea and Sympathy	Nikki	Series regular, 6 episodes
1991–1995	Joking Apart	Tracy Glazebrook	Series regular, 13 episodes
1992	The Upper Hand	Michelle	Episode: "To Let or Not to Let"
1992	Casualty	Sally	Episode: "Rates of Exchange"
1993	The Gingerbread Girl	Stella	Recurring role, 5 episodes
1993	The Bill	Lisa Brooks	Episode: "Bare Faced Lies"
1995–1996	Next of Kin	Liz	Recurring role, 13 episodes
1997	Heartbeat	Lieutenant	Episode: "Substitute"
1998	Heartburn Hotel	Rita	Episodes: "Toenails" & "Frustration"
1998	Verdict	Sally Taylor	Episode: "Be My Valentine"
1999	The Ambassador	Annette	Episode: "A Matter of Life and Death"
2002	Where the Heart Is	Julie Sparke	Episode: "No Turning Back"
2002	Merseybeat	Jacqui McHale	Episode: "Endgame"
2003	The Afternoon Play	Yvonne	Episode: "Heroes and Villains"
2003	Burn It	Bev	Recurring role, 5 episodes
2003	The Bill	Shirley Fielding	Episode: "Rose-Coloured Glasses"
2003	Murder Investigation Team	Celia Seagrove	Episode: "Daddy's Little Girl"
2003	Keen Eddie	Charlotte	Episode: "Horse Heir"
2004	The Courtroom	Diane Eaton	Episode: "Beloved Daughter"
2004	The Long Firm	Judy Garland	Episode: "Ruby's Story"
2004	Casualty	Gina Driscoll	Episodes: "I Love You, I Hate You" & "Forget Me Not"
2005	The Royal	Sylvia	Episode: "Sins of the Father"
2005	Vincent	Deborah Finnigan	Episode: "Series 1, Episode 3"
2005	Doctors	Julie Bolton	Episode: "Little Lies"
2006	Northern Lights	Maureen	Episode: "Series 1, Episode 2"
2007	Doctors	Jean Hobbs	Episode: "Off the Edge"
2007	Dalziel and Pascoe	Grace Beck	Episode: "Project Aphrodite"
2007	Casualty	Linda Riley	Episode: "The Fires Within"
2010	Doctors	Laura Wakefield	Episode: "Hanging On"
2011	Candy Cabs	Barb	Episode: "Series 1, Episode 2"
2011	Casualty	Seonaidh Lucas	Episode: "Mea Culpa"
2013	New Tricks	Angela Gold	Episode: "Cry Me a River"
2013	Doctors	Claire Cheeseman	Episode: "Mom"
2013–2014	Scott & Bailey	Sharon Bailey	Recurring role, 5 episodes
2014–2017	Casualty	Molly Drover	Recurring role, 4 episodes
2019	The Bay	Margaret Foley	Series regular, 6 episodes

=== Theatre ===
Year	Title	Role	Venue	Notes	Ref.
1984	Merrily We Roll Along	Mary Flynn	Royal Exchange, Manchester		
1984	Carousel	Carrie Pipperidge	Royal Exchange, Manchester		
1994	She Loves Me	Ilona Ritter	Savoy Theatre, London		
1996	Dead Funny	Lisa	Theatre Royal, Windsor	Also UK tour	
1996	Cash on Delivery	Linda Swan	Whitehall Theatre, London		
1997	Bedevilled	Florence Bravo	Crucible Theatre, Sheffield		
1997	Saturday Night	Celeste	Bridewell Theatre, London		
1997	Lucky Stiff	Rita LaPorta	Bridewell Theatre, London		
1999	Honk!	Ida	Royal National Theatre, London		
2000	Guys and Dolls	Miss Adelaide	Crucible Theatre, Sheffield		
2001	Last Song of the Nightingale	Martha	New End Theatre, London		
2003	High Society	Liz Imbrie	Regent's Park Open Air Theatre, London		
2004	Billy Liar	Mother	Churchill Theatre, Bromley	Also England tour	
2005	Sex, Chips & Rock n' Roll	Irma Brookes	Royal Exchange, Manchester		
2006	Les Misérables	Madame Thénardier	Queen's Theatre, London		
2007	Hairspray	Velma Von Tussle	Shaftesbury Theatre, London		
2008	La Cage aux Folles	Jacqueline	Playhouse Theatre, London		
2010	End of the Rainbow	Judy Garland	Royal & Derngate, Northampton & Trafalgar Theatre, London		
2012	End of the Rainbow	Judy Garland	Guthrie Theater, Minneapolis & Belasco Theatre, New York City		
2014	The Hypochondriac	Toinette	Theatre Royal, Bath	Also UK tour	
2015	Mrs Henderson Presents	Laura Henderson	Theatre Royal, Bath & Noël Coward Theatre, London & Royal Alexandra Theatre, Toronto		
2017; 2019	Follies	Carlotta Campion	Royal National Theatre, London		
2018	Ruthless!	Lita Encore	Arts Theatre, London		
2019	Mame	Mame Dennis	Hope Mill Theatre, Manchester		
2020; 2022	Hangmen	Alice	John Golden Theatre, New York City		
2022	Gypsy	Rose Hovick	Alexandra Palace Theatre, London		
2023	How to Succeed in Business Without Really Trying	J. B. Biggley	Southwark Playhouse, London		
2023	Here We Are	Woman	The Shed, New York City		
2025	Here We Are	Woman	Lyttelton Theatre, London		
2025	The Code	Tallulah Bankhead	Southwark Playhouse		

== Awards and nominations ==
=== Stage ===
Year	Award	Category	Work	Result	Ref.
1984	Manchester Evening News Theatre Award	Best Actress	Carousel and Merrily We Roll Along	Won	
1995	Laurence Olivier Award	Best Performance in a Supporting Role in a Musical	She Loves Me	Won	
2004	Laurence Olivier Award	Best Performance in a Supporting Role in a Musical	High Society	Nominated	
2005	TMA Award	Best Supporting Performance in a Musical	Sex, Chips and Rock 'n' Roll	Won	
2008	Laurence Olivier Award	Best Performance in a Supporting Role in a Musical	Hairspray	Won	
2008	WhatsOnStage Award	Best Supporting Actress in a Musical	Hairspray	Won	
2009	WhatsOnStage Award	Best Supporting Actress in a Musical	La Cage aux Folles	Won	
2011	Laurence Olivier Award	Best Actress	End of the Rainbow	Nominated	
2011	WhatsOnStage Award	Best Actress in a Play	End of the Rainbow	Nominated	
2012	Tony Award	Best Performance by a Leading Actress in a Play	End of the Rainbow	Nominated	
2012	Drama Desk Award	Outstanding Actress in a Play	End of the Rainbow	Won	
2012	Drama League Award	Distinguished Performance	End of the Rainbow	Nominated	
2012	Outer Critics Circle Award	Outstanding Actress in a Play	End of the Rainbow	Won	
2016	Laurence Olivier Award	Best Actress in a Musical	Mrs Henderson Presents	Nominated	
2018	Laurence Olivier Award	Best Actress in a Supporting Role in a Musical	Follies	Nominated	
2018	WhatsOnStage Award	Best Supporting Actress in a Musical	Follies	Nominated	
2020	WhatsOnStage Award	Best Actress in a Musical	Mame	Nominated	
2025	Laurence Olivier Award	Best Performance in a Supporting Role in a Musical	Here We Are	Nominated	
