= Vivian Van Damm =

English businessman and theatre impresario (1889–1960)

Vivian Talbot Van Damm (28 June 1889 – 14 December 1960) was a prominent British theatre impresario from 1932 until 1960, managing the Windmill Theatre in London's Great Windmill Street. The theatre was famed for its pioneering tableaux vivants of motionless female nudity and for its reputation of having 'never closed' during the Blitz.

== Early life ==
Van Damm, known as "VD", came from a middle-class London family of Dutch Jewish origin. He left school at 14 to work in a garage, was a mechanic for Clement-Talbot in the early days of automobiles, but later abandoned the motor trade to manage West End cinemas.

In 1914, he married Natalie Lyons. They had three daughters: one of whom was Sheila van Damm (1922–1987).

== Windmill Theatre ==
In 1931, Laura Henderson opened the tiny, one-tier Windmill Theatre as a playhouse, but it was not profitable, and she soon resorted to showing films. She then hired Van Damm and they produced Revudeville, a programme of continuous variety, comprising 18 entertainment acts. That was also a commercial failure, so they included nudity to emulate the Folies Bergère and the Moulin Rouge.

The key element was Van Damm's exploitation of a legal loophole (or zone of tolerance) that nude statues could not be banned on moral grounds. This led to the legendary "Windmill Girls". The girls had to remain motionless, the Lord Chamberlain's ruling being, "If you move, it's rude". To ward off criticism he used his own daughter, under the stage name of Betti Talbot, as one of the nudes. The Hollywood film Tonight and Every Night, starring Rita Hayworth, told some of the story of the Windmill, though it contained no nudity.

Van Damm's flair for public relations created the legend of the theatre that "never closed". Newspapers in World War II carried pictures of plucky Windmill girls in tin hats on fire-watching duty, and stories of showgirls giving V-signs to German bombers. Indeed, except for a 12-day period in 1939, when all London theatres were ordered closed, the Windmill remained open throughout the Blitz.

Laura Henderson bequeathed the Windmill Theatre to Vivian Van Damm in 1944 and he ran it until his death in December 1960. He bequeathed it to his daughter, Sheila van Damm, a rally driver, whom he taught to drive somewhat before the strictly legal age. The Windmill Theatre closed on 31 October 1964.

== Other interests ==
Vivian Van Damm was the Vice-President of the London-based Magicians' Club which held charity shows at the Windmill Theatre.

== In popular culture ==
A 1949 film called Murder at the Windmill (Mystery at the Burlesque in the U.S.A.) featured Diana Decker, Jon Pertwee and Jimmy Edwards and was directed by Val Guest. Jack Livesey portrayed Vivian Van Damm in this film. Van Damm was portrayed by Bob Hoskins in the film Mrs Henderson Presents (2005).

== Bibliography ==
- "London's Windmill Theatre" (16 March 1942) Life magazine Vol.12 No.11
- "Have You Been to the Windmill Theatre?" (1949) Film and Art Reel, Vol.6 No.1
- Pat Raphael (1949) "Extracts from the Diary of a Windmill Girl", Film and Art Reel, Vol.6 No.2
- John Chillingworth (21 July 1951) "Non Stop Peep Show", Picture Post, Vol.52, No.3
- Vivian Van Damm (1952) Tonight and Every Night, Stanley Paul & Co., London OCLC 504582888
- Vivian Van Damm (5 May 1956) "Three Goons for the Price of One, the Windmill Story", Illustrated
- Photographs of Artistes (July, 1958) London Life
- "The Windmill" (March 1973) Fiesta Vol.7 No.4.
- Tony Clayton ( May 2004) "We Never Closed", Yours
- Maurice Poole (Spring, 2009) "Tonight and Every Night", Soho Clarion, No.136
- "Jason" (1940) Blonde and Brunette, Chapman and Hall, London OCLC 561150083
- British Pathe films
- Murder at the Windmill (1949) film. In the U.S.A. titled Mystery at the Burlesque. Directed by Val Guest.
