= Party =

Gathering of invited guests

Hip, Hip, Hurrah! (1888) by Peder Severin Krøyer, a painting portraying an artists' party in 19th-century Denmark

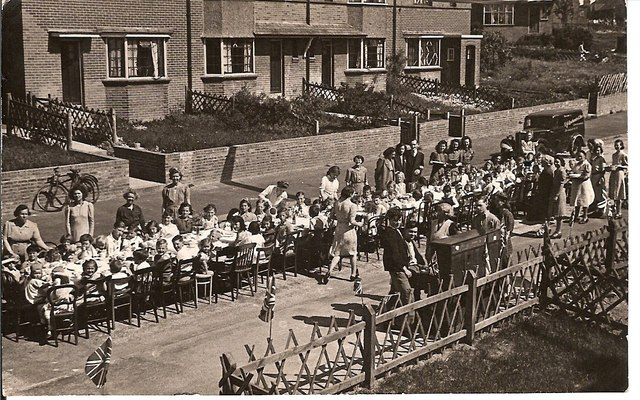
A September 1945 street party in Selborne Road, Margate, celebrating victory in the Second World War

A party is a gathering of people who have been invited by a host for the purposes of socializing, conversation, recreation, or as part of a festival or other commemoration or celebration of a special occasion. A party will often feature food and beverages, and generally conversation, music, dancing, or other forms of entertainment.

Some parties take place in honor of a specific person, day, or event, such as a birthday party, a Super Bowl party, or a St. Patrick's Day party. Parties of this kind are often called celebrations. A party is not necessarily a private occasion. Public parties are sometimes held in parks, restaurants, pubs, beer gardens, nightclubs, or bars, and the host or the venue may charge people attending such parties an admission fee. Large parties in public streets may celebrate events such as (for example) Mardi Gras or the signing of a peace treaty ending a long war.

Historically, English-speakers have also referred to certain social gatherings as "drums" or as "assemblies".

== Types ==
=== Birthday party ===
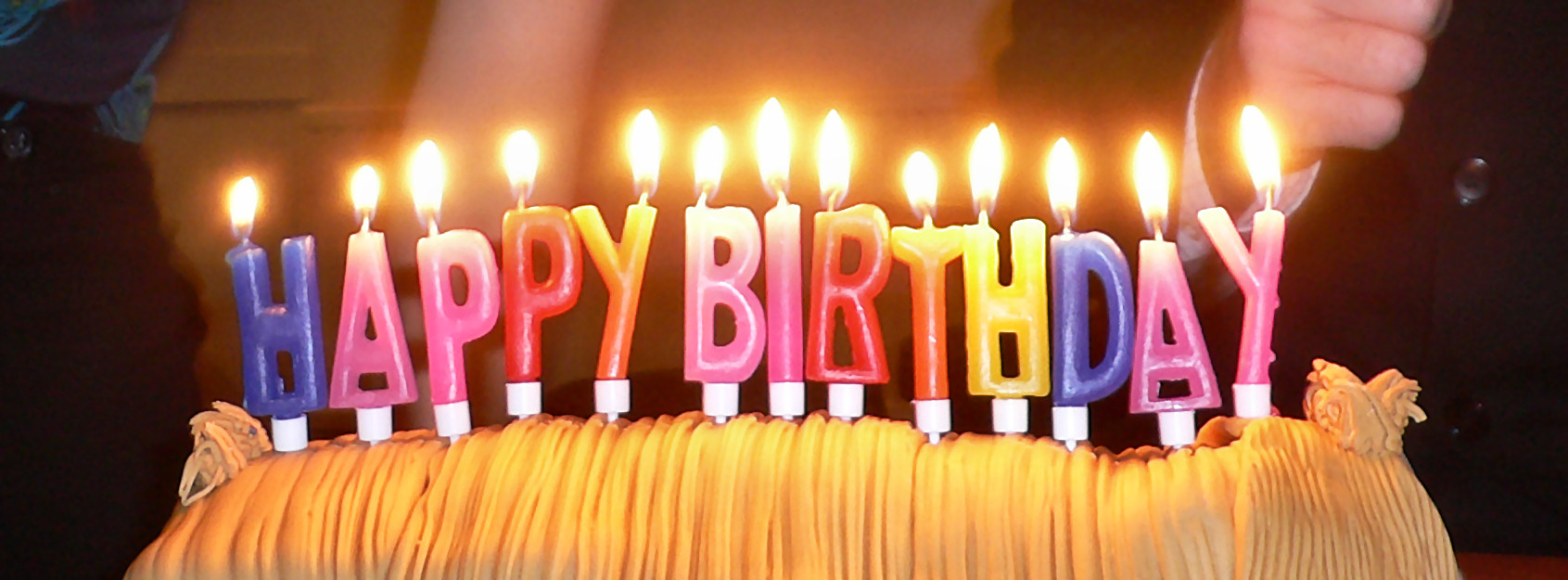
A birthday cake with lit novelty candles

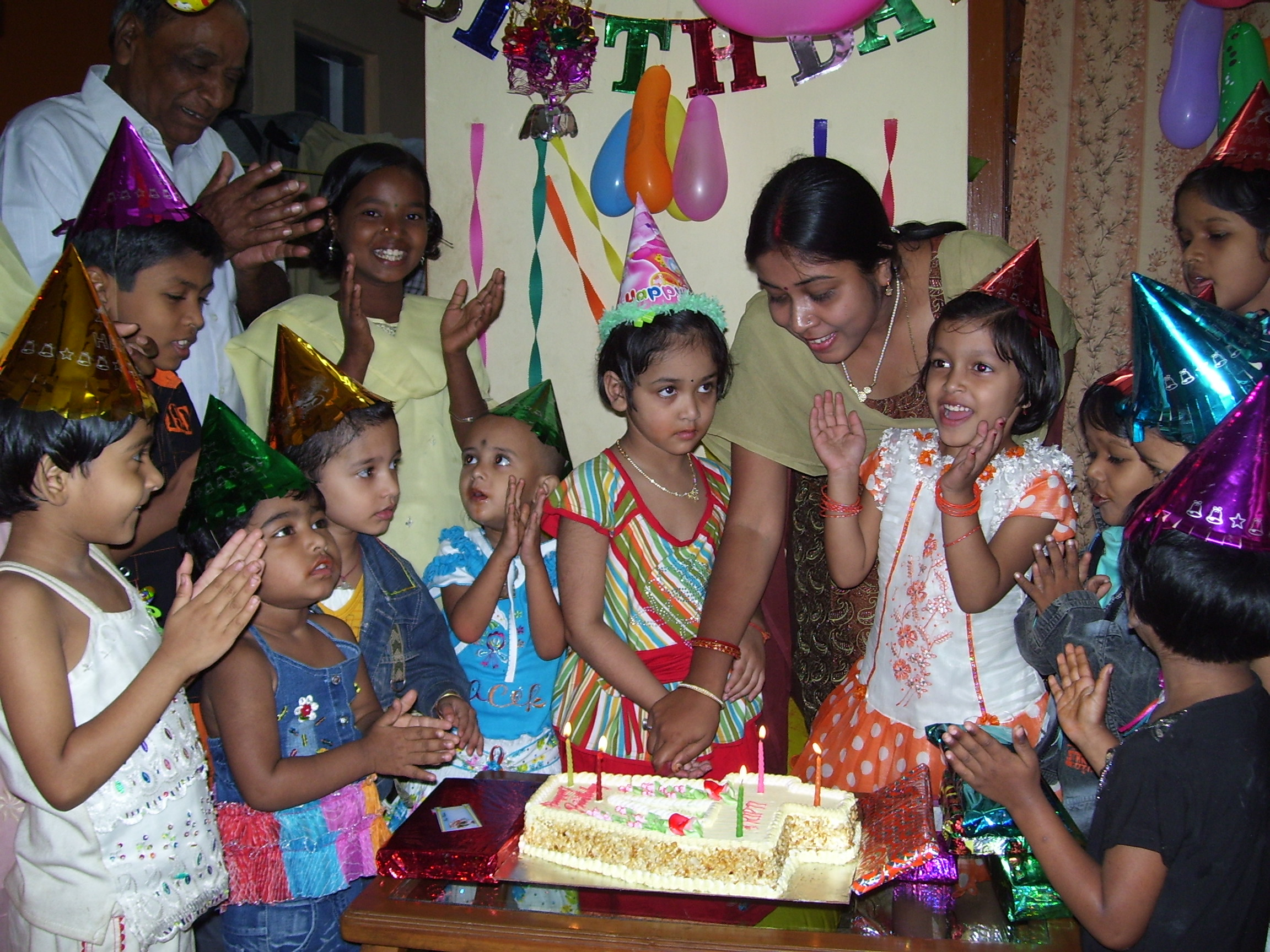
Children at a birthday party in India, 2009

A birthday party is a celebration of the anniversary of the birth of the person who is being honored. While there is historical precedent for birthday parties for the rich and powerful throughout history, the tradition extended to middle-class Americans around the nineteenth century and took on more modern norms and traditions in the twentieth century. Birthday parties are now a feature of many cultures.

In Western cultures, birthday parties include a number of common rituals. The guests may be asked to bring a gift for the honored person. Party locations are often decorated with colorful decorations, such as balloons and streamers. A birthday cake is usually served with lit candles that are to be blown out after a "birthday wish" has been made. The person being honored will be given the first piece of cake. While the birthday cake is being brought to the table, the song "Happy Birthday to You" or some other birthday song is sung by the guests.

At parties for children, time is often taken for the "gift opening" wherein the individual whose birthday is celebrated opens each of the gifts brought. It is also common at children's parties for the host to give parting gifts to the attendees in the form of "goodie bags". Children and even adults sometimes wear colorful cone-shaped party hats.

Birthday parties are often larger and more extravagant if they celebrate someone who has reached what is regarded in the culture as a milestone age, such as the transition from childhood to adulthood. Examples of traditional coming of age celebrations include the North American sweet sixteen party and the Latin American quinceañera.

A Children's Party painted by William Hogarth in 1730

Since medieval times, children have dressed specially for birthday parties; there is evidence to suggest historical birthday parties existed in Germany as kinderfeste.

A children's party or kids' party is a party for children such as a birthday party or tea party. Since medieval times, children have dressed specially for such occasions.

=== Surprise party ===
A surprise party is a party that is not made known beforehand to the person in whose honor it is being held.

Birthday surprise parties are the most common kind of surprise party. At most such parties, the guests will arrive an hour or so before the honoree arrives. Often, a friend in on the surprise will lead the honoree to the location of the party without letting on anything.

The guests might even conceal themselves from view, and then when the honoree enters the room, they leap from hiding and all shout, "Surprise!". For some surprise birthday parties, it is considered to be a good tactic to shock the honoree. Streamers, silly string, and balloons may be used for this purpose. Evidence of a party, such as decorations and balloons, are not made visible from the exterior of the home or party venue, so that the honoree will suspect nothing.

=== Dinner party ===
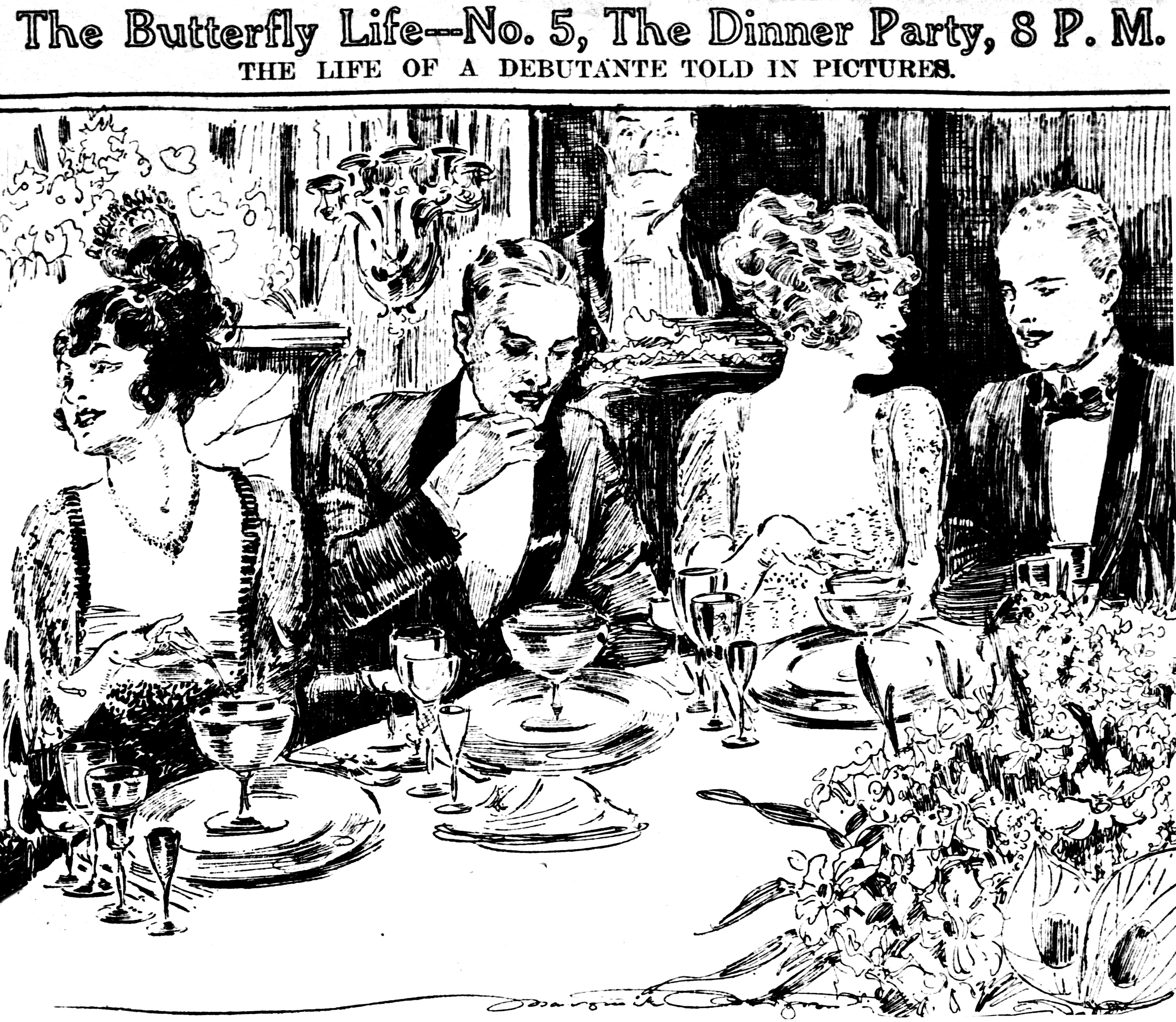
A formal dinner party as sketched in 1920 by reporter-artist Marguerite Martyn

A dinner party is a social gathering at which people eat dinner together, usually in the host's home. At the most formal dinner parties, the dinner is served on a dining table with place settings. Dinner parties are often preceded by a cocktail hour in a living room or bar, where guests drink cocktails while mingling and conversing. Wine is usually served throughout the meal, often with a different wine accompanying each course.

At less formal dinner parties, a buffet is provided. Guests choose food from the buffet and eat while standing up and conversing. Women guests may wear cocktail dresses; men may wear blazers.

At some informal dinner parties, the host may ask guests to bring food or beverages (a main dish, a side dish, a dessert, or appetizers). A party of this type is called a potluck or potluck dinner. In the United States, potlucks are very often held in churches and community centers.

=== Garden party ===
A garden party is a party in a park or a garden. An event described as a garden party is usually more formal than other outdoor gatherings, which may be called simply parties, picnics, barbecues, etc. A garden party can be a prestigious event. For example, invitations by the British Sovereign to garden parties at Buckingham Palace or at the Palace of Holyroodhouse (in Scotland) are considered an honor. The President of France holds a garden party at the Palais de l'Elysée in Paris on Bastille Day.

=== Cocktail party ===
A cocktail party is a party at which cocktails are served. It is sometimes called a "cocktail reception". Women who attend a cocktail party may wear a cocktail dress. A cocktail hat is sometimes worn as a fashion statement.

=== Tea party ===
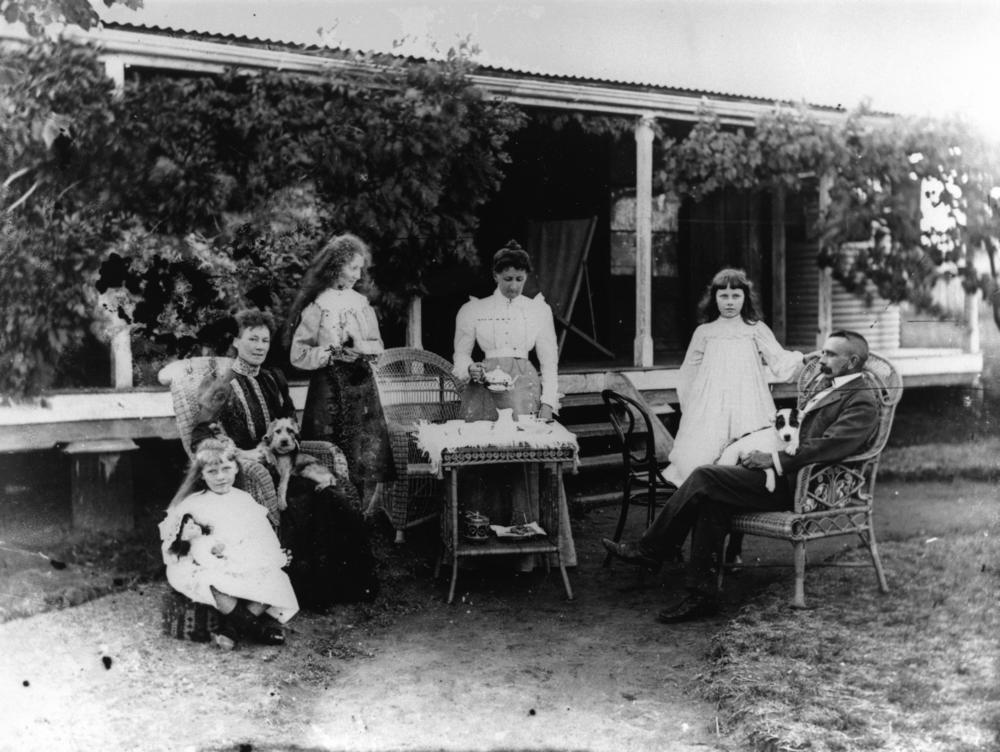
An outdoor tea party in Australia (between 1900 and 1910)

In Anglo-American culture, a tea party is a formal gathering for afternoon tea. These parties were traditionally attended only by women, but men may also be invited. Tea parties are often characterized by the use of prestigious tableware, such as bone china and silver. The table, whatever its size or cost, is made to look its prettiest, with cloth napkins and matching cups and plates.

In addition to tea, larger parties may serve punch or, in cold weather, hot chocolate. The tea is accompanied by a variety of easily managed foods. Thin sandwiches such as cucumber or tomato, bananas, cake slices, buns, and cookies are all common choices.

=== Reception ===
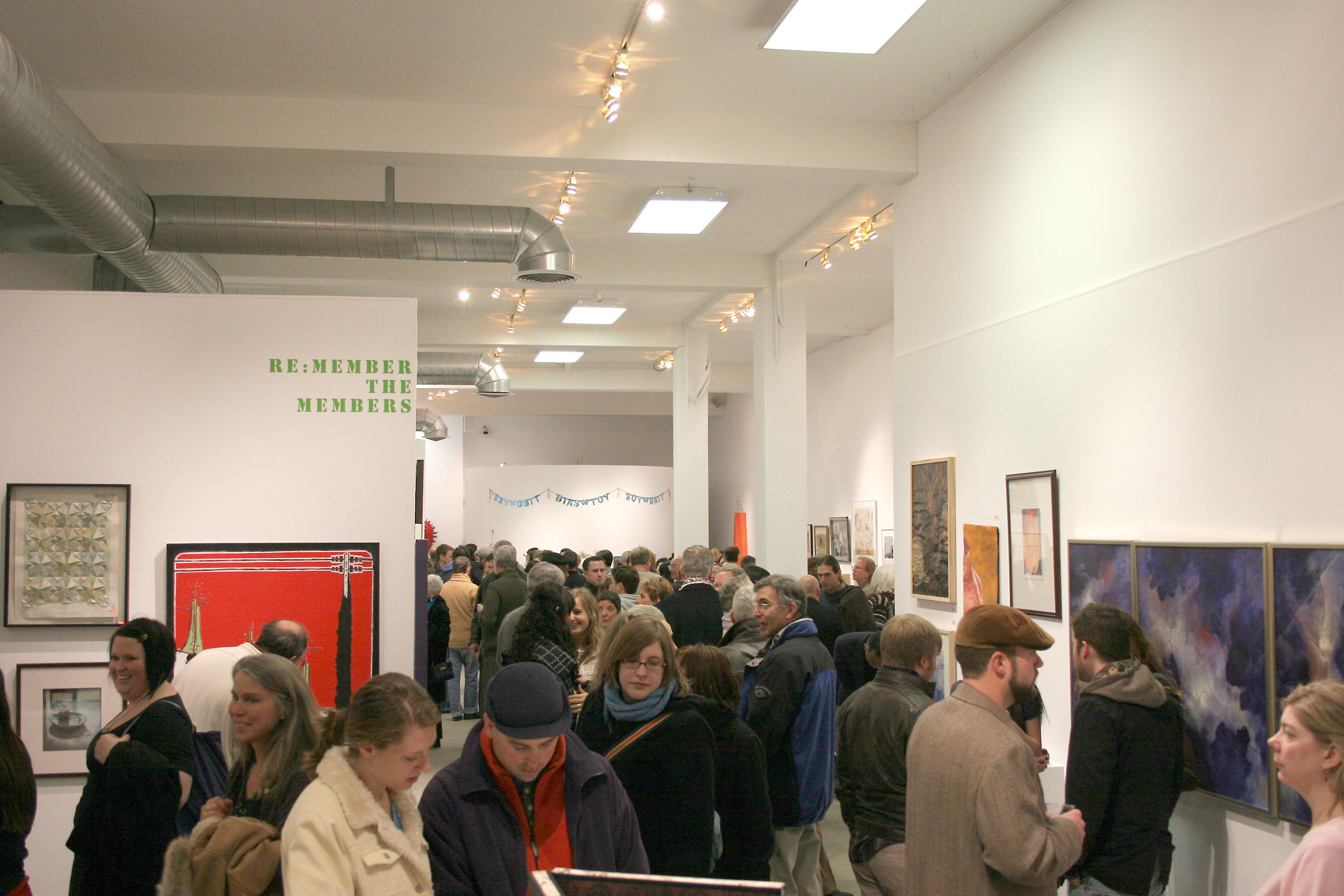
Reception at an art exhibition opening

Formal receptions are parties that are designed to receive a large number of guests, often at prestigious venues such as Buckingham Palace, the White House, or Government Houses of the British Empire and Commonwealth. The hosts and any guests of honor form a receiving line in order of precedence near the entrance. Each guest is announced to the host who greets each one in turn as he or she arrives. Each guest properly speaks little more than his name (if necessary) and a conventional greeting or congratulation to each person in the receiving line. In this way, the line of guests progresses steadily without unnecessary delay. After formally receiving each guest in this fashion, the hosts may mingle with the guests.

Somewhat less formal receptions are common in academic settings, sometimes to honor a guest lecturer, or to celebrate a special occasion such as retirement of a respected member of staff. Receptions are also common in symposium or academic conference settings, as an environment for attendees to mingle and interact informally. These gatherings may be accompanied by a sit-down dinner, or more commonly, a stand-up informal buffet meal.

Receptions are also held to celebrate exhibition openings at art galleries or museums. The featured artist or artists are often present, as well as the curators who organized the exhibition. In addition or instead, a celebratory reception may be held partway through or at the end of an exhibition run. This alternative scheduling allows guests more time to see the exhibition in depth at their own pace, before meeting the featured guests. Some food is often served, as in academic gatherings.

Refreshments at a reception may be as minimal, such as coffee or lemonade, or as elaborate as those at a state dinner.

=== Soirées ===
In the 18th century, in France and England, it became fashionable for wealthy, well married ladies who had a residence "in town" to invite accomplished guests to visit their home in the evening, to partake of refreshments and cultural conversation. Soirées often included refined musical entertainment, and the term is still sometimes used to define a certain sophisticated type of evening party.

Society hostesses included actresses or other women with an influential reputation. The character of the hostess determined the character of the soirée and the choice of guests.

Famous soirée hostesses include Hester Thrale and Madame de Staël.

=== Dances and balls ===
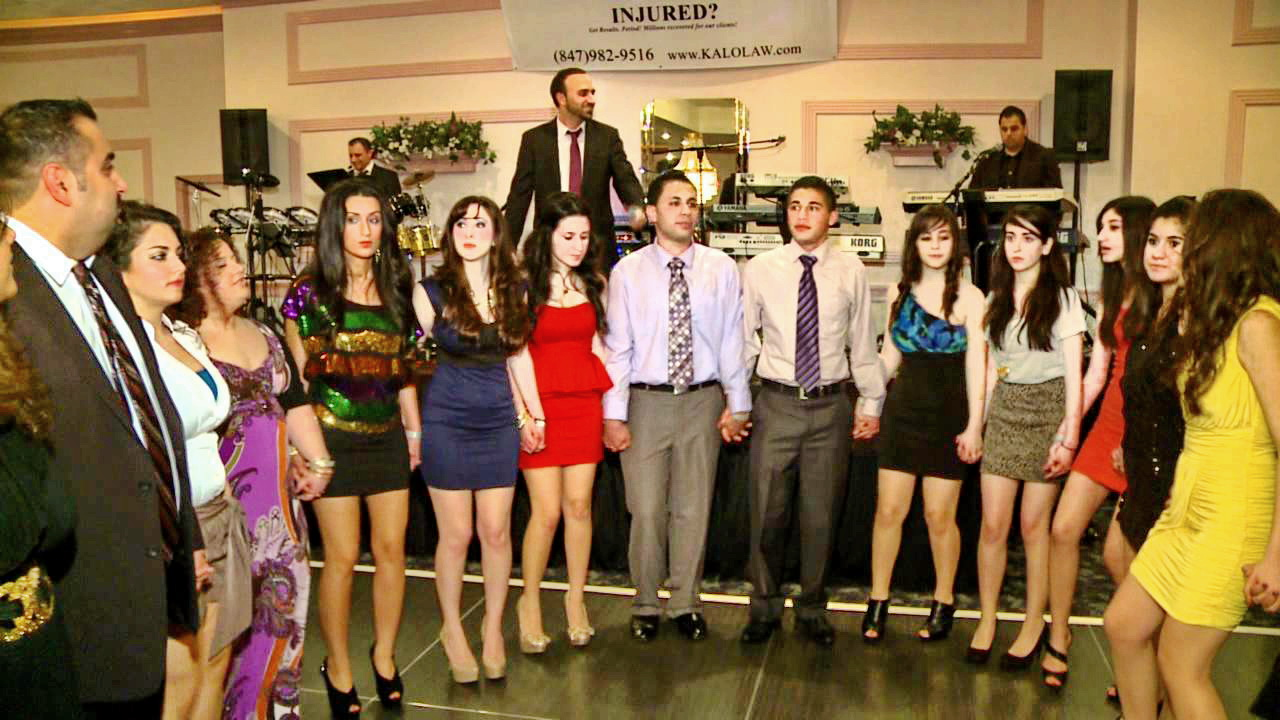
Folk dance in an Assyrian party, Chicago, Illinois

A dance is a social gathering at which the guests dance. It may be a casual, informal affair, or a structured event, such as a school dance or a charity ball. Dances usually take place during the evening. An afternoon dance is formally known as a tea dance. Some dances feature specific kinds of dancing, such as square dancing.

A ball is a large formal party that features ballroom dancing. Women guests wear ball gowns; men wear evening dress.

=== Block party ===
A block party is a public party that is attended by the residents of a specific city block or neighborhood. These parties are typically held in a city street that has been closed to traffic to accommodate the party. At some block parties, attendees are free to pass from house to house, socializing, and often drinking alcoholic beverages.

=== Costume or fancy dress party ===
At a masquerade ball, guests wear masks to conceal their identities. Guests at a costume party or a fancy dress party wear costumes. These parties are sometimes associated with holiday events, such as Halloween and Mardi Gras.

=== Christmas caroling party ===
In English and American culture during the Christmas season, it is traditional to have a Christmas caroling party. People go from door to door in a neighborhood and sing Christmas carols. Some popular Christmas carols are "We Wish You a Merry Christmas", "Deck the Halls", "The Twelve Days of Christmas", "Frosty the Snowman", "Jingle Bells", "Silver Bells", "Santa Claus Is Comin' to Town", and "O Holy Night".

In Spain, this type of party is called El Aguinaldo. It is the same as in England and the United States, but the only difference is that the children who sing the carols are given tips. Christmas songs are called villancicos in Spain; they are mainly sung by children at small parties.

=== Parties for teenagers and young adults ===
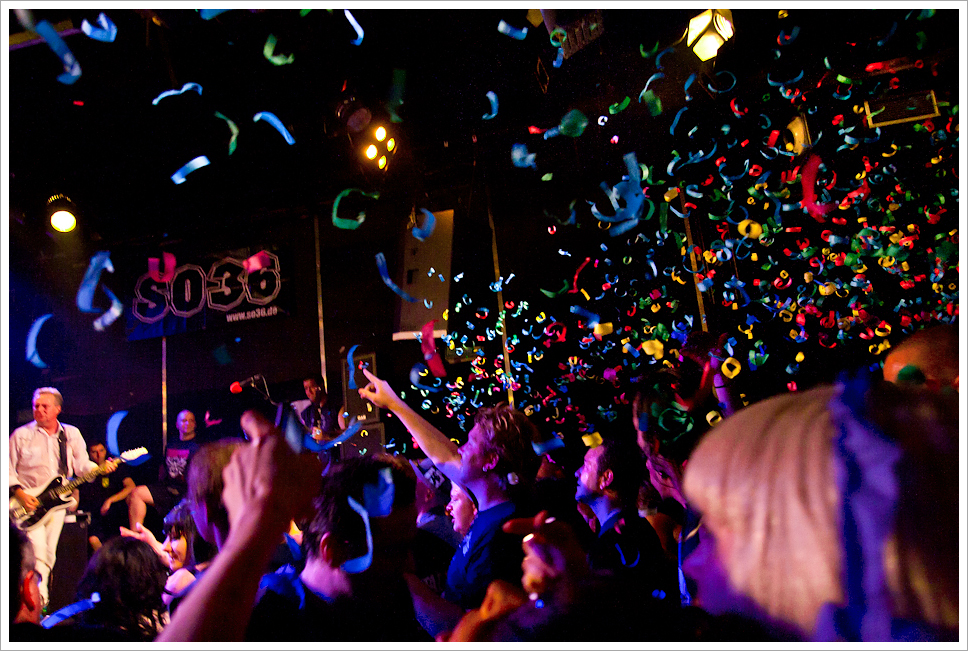
A dance party supported by a live band (SO36, Berlin)

Dance parties are gatherings in bars or community centers where the guests dance to house music, techno music, or disco. The music for dance parties is usually selected and played by a disc jockey.

A spin-off of dance parties, the rave involves dancing to loud house music, techno music, or industrial music. Rave parties may be attended by as few as a score of people in a basement or, more likely, by a few hundred people in a club, to as many as thousands in a large warehouse, field, or even tens of thousands in a sporting arena, amusement park, or other large space. Raves are associated with illegal drugs such as ecstasy and psychedelic drugs.

A house party is a party where a large group of people get together at a private home to socialize. House parties that involve the drinking of beer pumped from a keg are called keg parties or "keggers." These parties are popular in North America, the United Kingdom, and Australia and are often attended by people under the legal drinking age. Sometimes, even older party-goers run afoul of the law for having provided alcoholic beverages to minors. Arrests may also be made for violating a noise ordinance, for disorderly conduct, and even for operating a "blind pig", an establishment that illegally sells alcoholic beverages.

On college campuses, parties are often hosted by fraternities.

Outdoor parties include bush parties and beach parties. Bush parties (also called "field parties") are held in a secluded area of a forest ("bush"), where friends gather to drink and talk. These parties are often held around a bonfire. Beach parties are held on a sandy shoreline of a lake, river, or sea, and also often feature a bonfire.

School-related parties for teenagers and young adults include proms and graduation parties, which are held in honor of someone who has recently graduated from a school or university.

=== Pool party ===
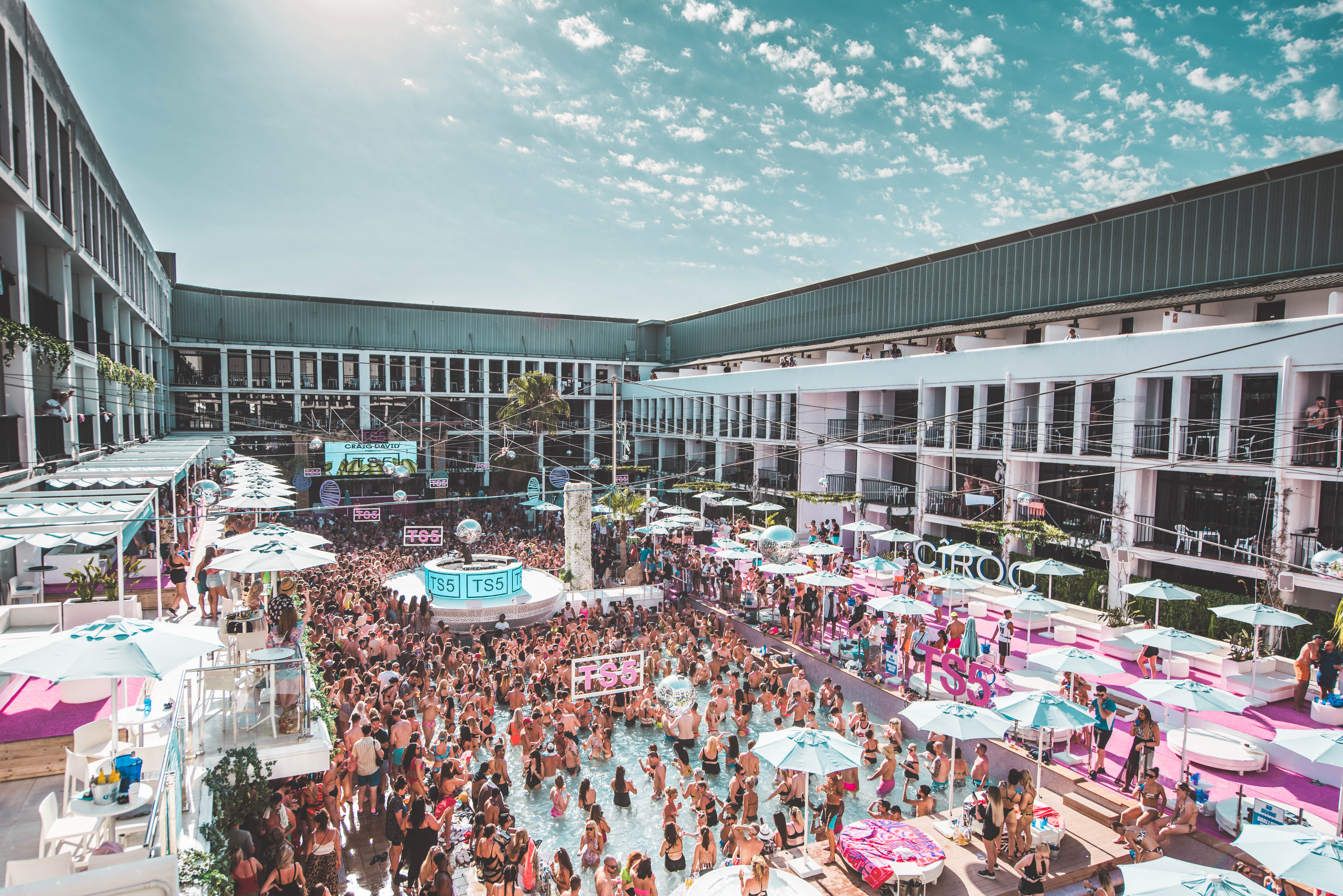
Pool party at Ibiza Rocks hotel

A pool party is a party in which the guests swim in a swimming pool.

=== Singles dance party and mixer ===
A singles dance party and mixer is a party which is organized for people who are not married and who want to find a partner for friendship, dating, or sex.

Usually a "mixer game" is played, to make it easy for people to meet each other. For example, each guest may be given a card with an inspiring quotation on it. The game is to find a potential partner who has the same quotation. Couples who have matching cards may be given a small prize.

These parties are sponsored by various organizations, both non-profit and for-profit.

=== Fundraising party ===
A fundraising party, or fundraiser, is a party that is held for the purpose of collecting money that will be given to some person or to some institution, such as a school, charity, business, or political campaign. These parties are usually formal and consist of a dinner followed by speeches or by a presentation extolling whatever the money is being raised for.

It is very common to charge an admission fee for parties of this kind. This fee may be as high as several thousand dollars, especially if money is being raised for a political campaign.

=== Graduation party ===
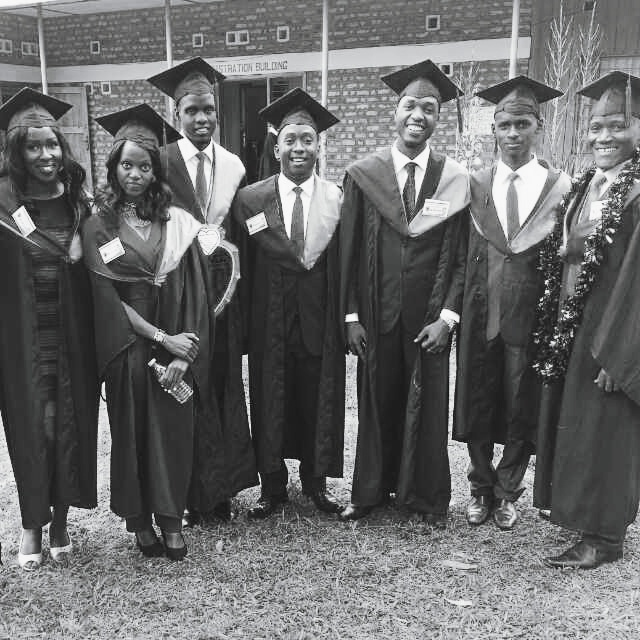
A group of graduate students at a graduation party

In some places, parties to celebrate graduation from school, college, or university are popular. A graduation party may be held on campus or external, and transportation is provided when location is far away.

=== Marriage-related parties ===
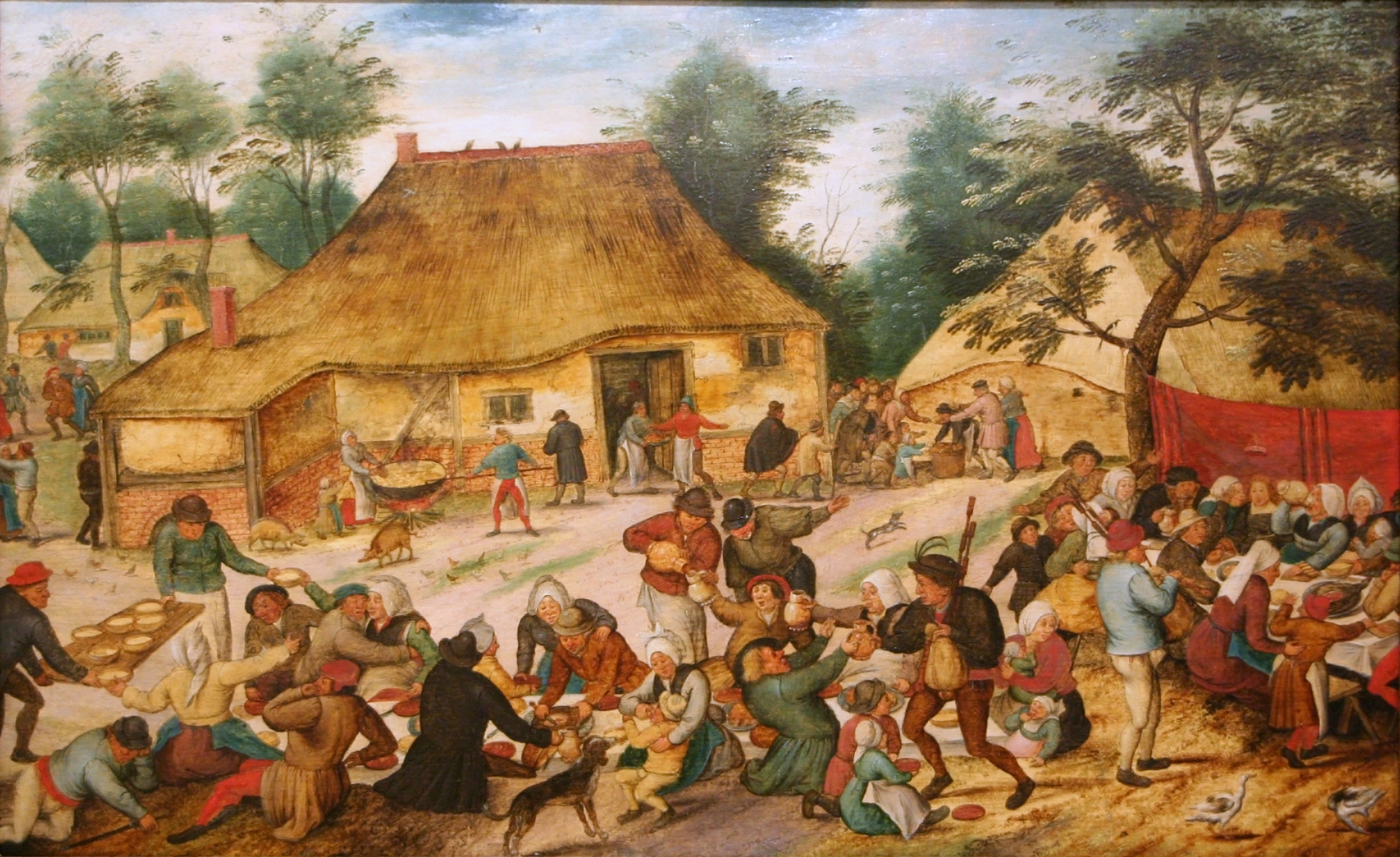
Wedding Feast in front of a Farm by Flemish artist Pieter Brueghel c. 1620

- Bridal shower
- Bachelor party (a.k.a. UK: stag night; Australia: Bucks Night)
- Bachelorette party (a.k.a. hen night, hen party)
- Wedding reception
- Divorce party

=== Showers ===
A shower is a party whose primary purpose is to give gifts to the guest of honor. Traditionally, a bridal shower is a way for an engaged woman to be "showered" with gifts for her upcoming married life (see hope chest). Guests are expected to bring a small gift related to the upcoming life event. Themed games are a frequent sight at this sort of party. A new twist on the baby shower for a pregnant woman is the gender reveal party, made possible by modern ultrasound technology.

=== Housewarming party ===
A housewarming party may be held when a family, couple, or person moves into a new house or apartment. It is an occasion for the hosts to show their new home to their friends. Housewarming parties are typically informal and do not include any planned activities other than a tour of the new house or apartment. Invited family members and friends may bring gifts for the new home.

=== Welcome party ===
A welcome party is held for the purpose of welcoming a newcomer, such as a new club member, a new employee, or a family's new baby.

=== Farewell party ===
In many cultures, it is customary to throw a farewell party in honor of someone who is moving away or departing on a long trip (often called a "going away party" and sometimes called a bon voyage party). Retirement parties for departing co-workers fall into this category. Several are described in Japan in Shusaku Endo's 1974 novel When I Whistle.

=== Cast party ===
A cast party is a celebration following the final performance of a theatrical event, such as a play, a musical, or an opera. A party of this kind may also be held following the end of shooting for a motion picture (called a "wrap party") or after the season's final episode of a television series. Cast parties are traditionally held for most theater performances, both professional and amateur.

Invited guests are usually restricted to performers, crew members, and a few others who did not participate in the performance, such as sponsors and donors who have helped fund the production.

=== Pre-party ===
A pre-party is a party that is held immediately before a school dance, a wedding, a birthday party, and a bar mitzvah. These parties are usually of short duration and sometimes involve getting ready for the event (e.g., the guests may put on makeup or costumes). Guests usually leave at the same time and arrive at the event together. Often people engage in pregaming or drinking before an event or a night out, especially if the event lacks access to alcohol.

=== After-party ===
An after-party is a party that is held after a play, wedding, school dance, or other more formal event.

== Parties on special days ==
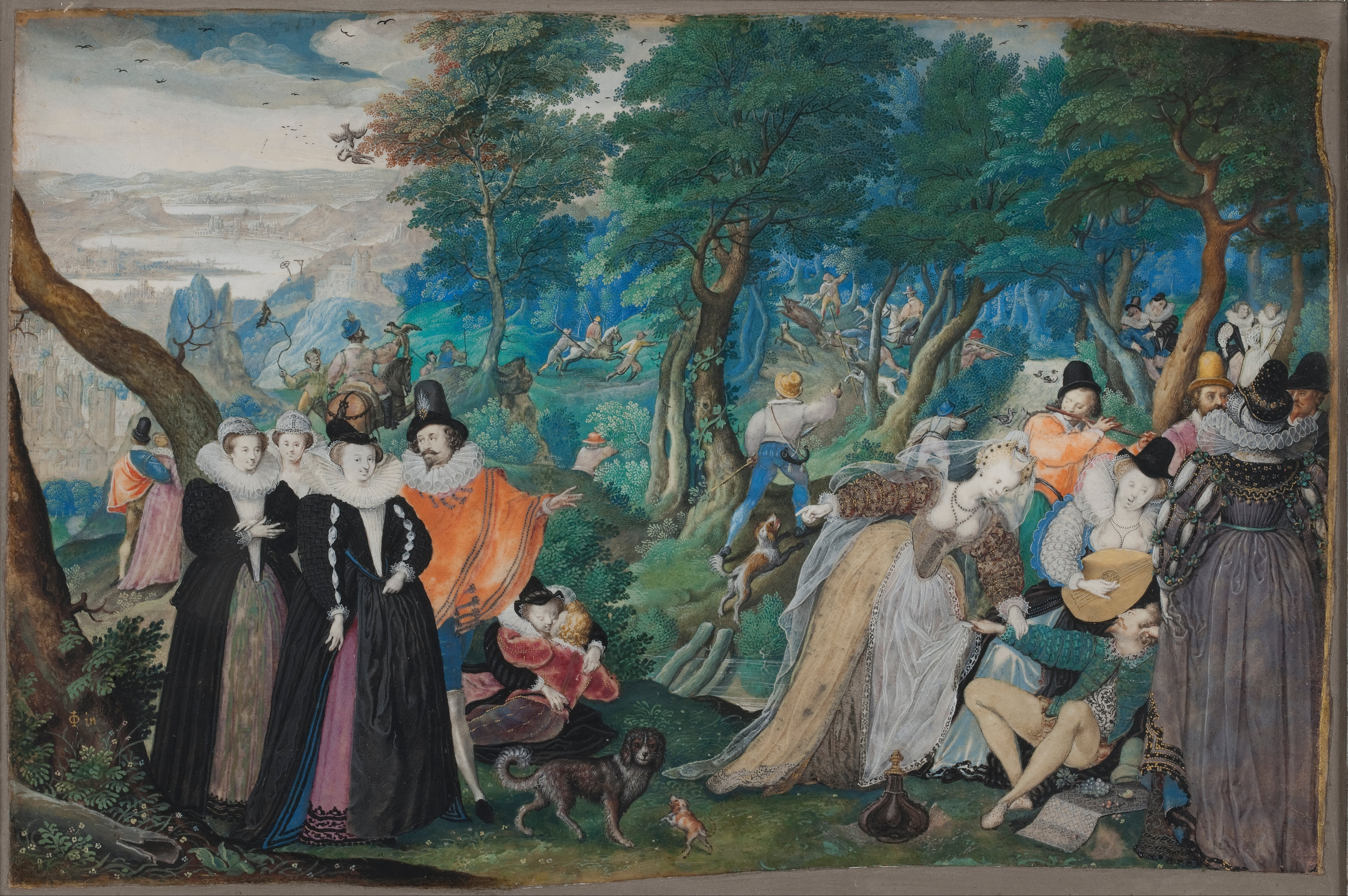
A Party in the Open Air by Isaac Oliver, c. 1590

International

- Christmas
- Halloween
- International Friendship Day
- Labour Day
- Mardi Gras
- Mischief Night
- Diwali
- New Year's Day
- New Year's Eve
- Lunar New Year

Australia

- Australia Day
- Grand Final Saturday
- Melbourne Cup Day

Canada

- Canada Day
- Labour Day
- Thanksgiving
- Victoria Day

France

- Bastille Day
- May Day

Germany

- German Unity Day
- May Day a.k.a. Tag der Arbeit
- Reformation Day
- Rosenmontag a.k.a. Rose Monday, highlight of the German carnival

India

- Diwali
- Holi
- Dussehra
- Indian Independence Day
- Republic Day
- Chaand Raat (Eid)
- Christmas
- Labour Day

Many other regional festivals, mostly different Hindu festivals in every state.

Iran and other Persified societies

- Nowruz

Ireland

- Saint Patrick's Day

Israel

- Passover
- Hanukkah
- Purim

Mexico

- Cinco de Mayo
- May Day

New Zealand

- Waitangi Day

Pakistan

- Pakistan Day
- Yom-e-Istiqlal
- Basant

Scotland

- Hogmanay

Sweden

- Midsummer Eve

United Kingdom

- Guy Fawkes Night
- Labour Day

United States

- Independence Day, a.k.a. the Fourth of July
- Labor Day
- Super Bowl Sunday
- Thanksgiving

Uruguay

- Nostalgia Night, the night before the Declaration of Independence

== Parties associated with religious events ==
Christian

- Christmas
- Easter
- Mardi Gras
- Saint Patrick's Day

Islamic

- Eid al-Adha
- Eid ul-Fitr

Jewish

- Hanukkah
- Passover
- Purim

== Notable parties ==
- Exotic Erotic Ball
- Burning Man
- Full Moon Party
- Lollapalooza
- Nuit Blanche
- Woodstock Festival
- Street Parade
- Soul Clap and Dance-Off

== Miscellaneous parties ==
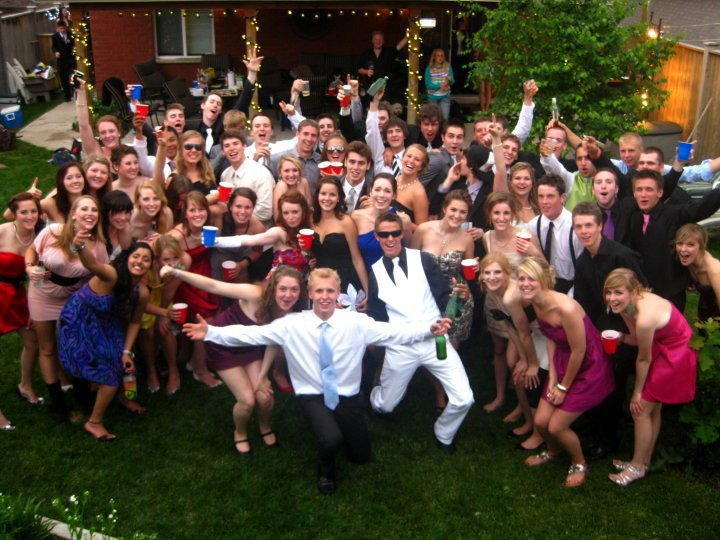
People posing at an outdoor party in Canada

Game party
A social gathering during which the guests play party games or board games.
LAN party
A party that involves multi-player computer games and uses a local area network.
Party plan
A form of direct selling, in which a party is used to sell products (for example, a Tupperware party).
Political houseparty
A party that is hosted in a private home for the purpose of supporting a particular candidate, political party, or ballot measure, or to share information and opinions about an upcoming election.
Quiet Party
A nightclub event where participants socialize by writing notes to each other instead of speaking. The single rule at these events is "no talking".

Sleepover party, also called a pajama party or slumber party
A party for which the guests are invited to stay overnight at the home of the host. These parties are usually for teenagers or young children.
Toga party
A party in which the guests wear togas.

== Gallery ==
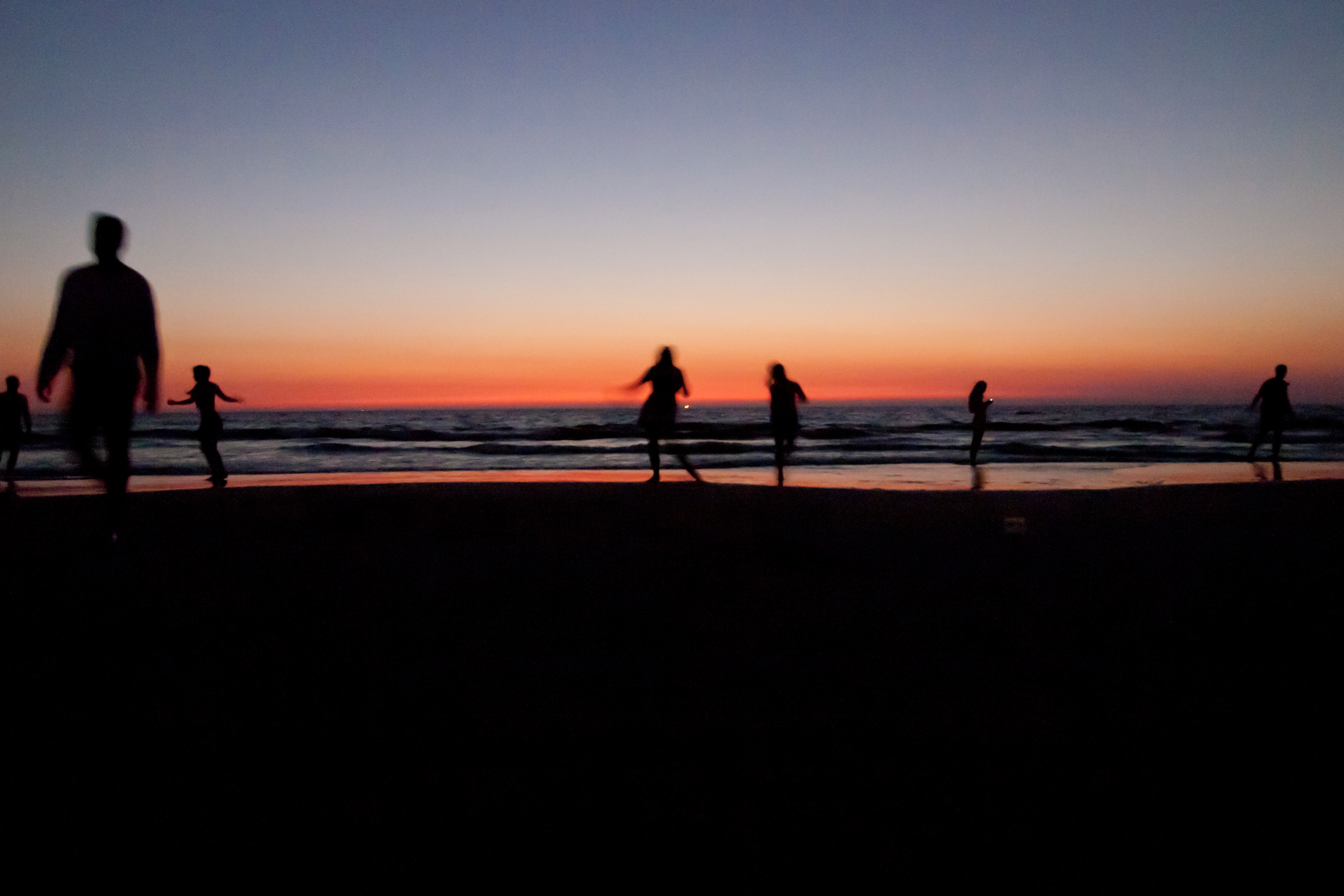
Party on the beach late at night, Goa

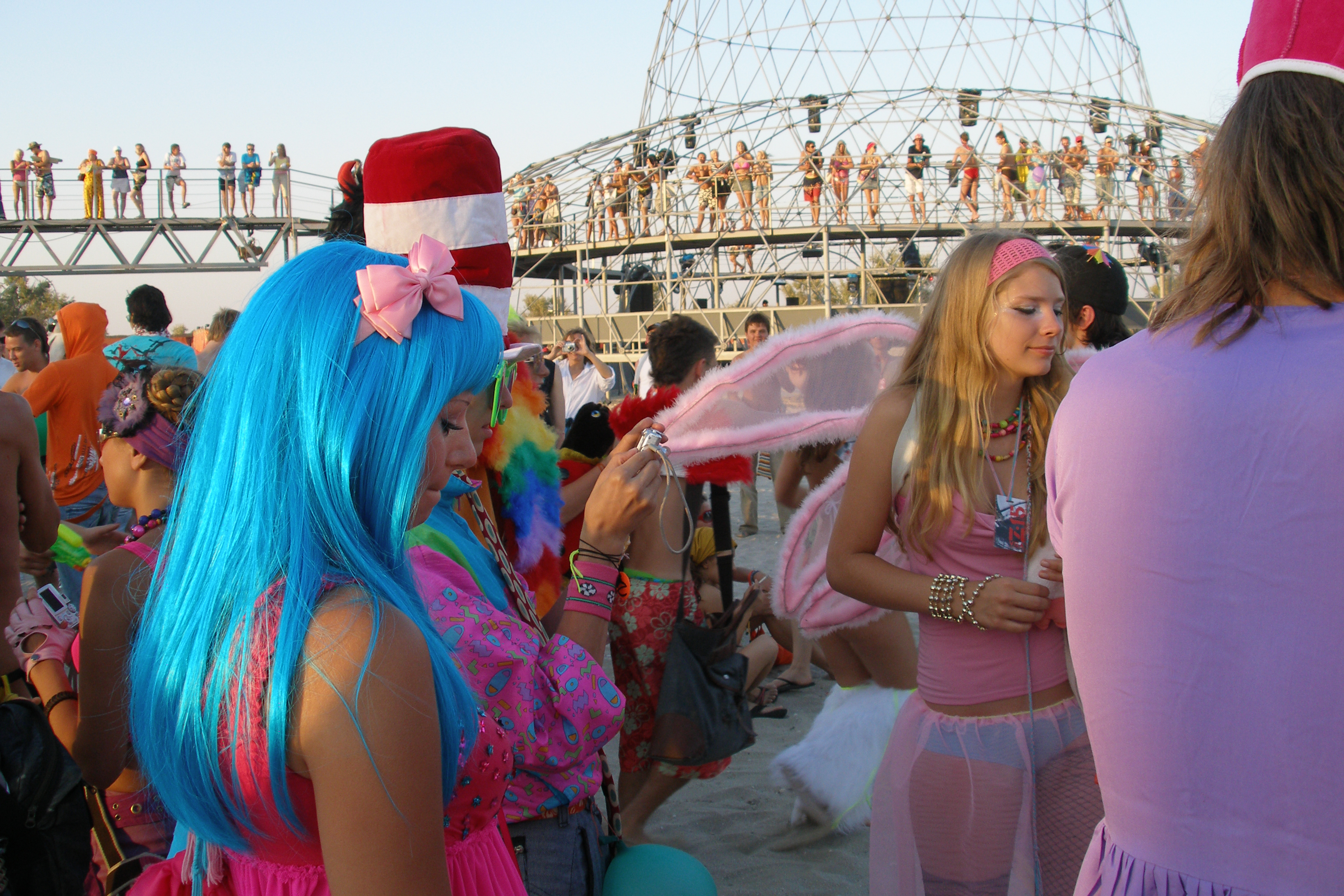
Costume party at Kazantip Festival, Crimea

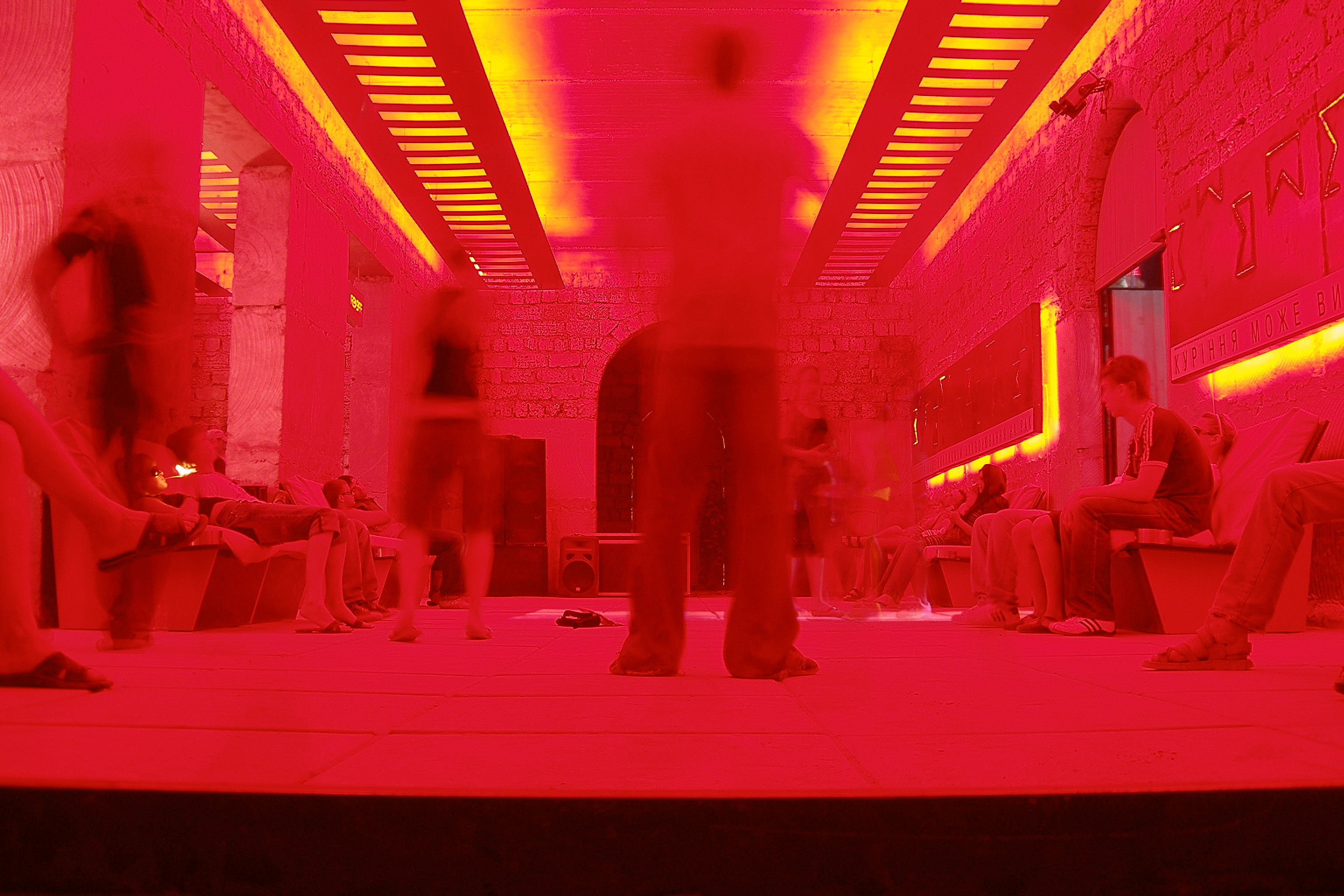
Music party in the club, Kazantip Festival, Crimea

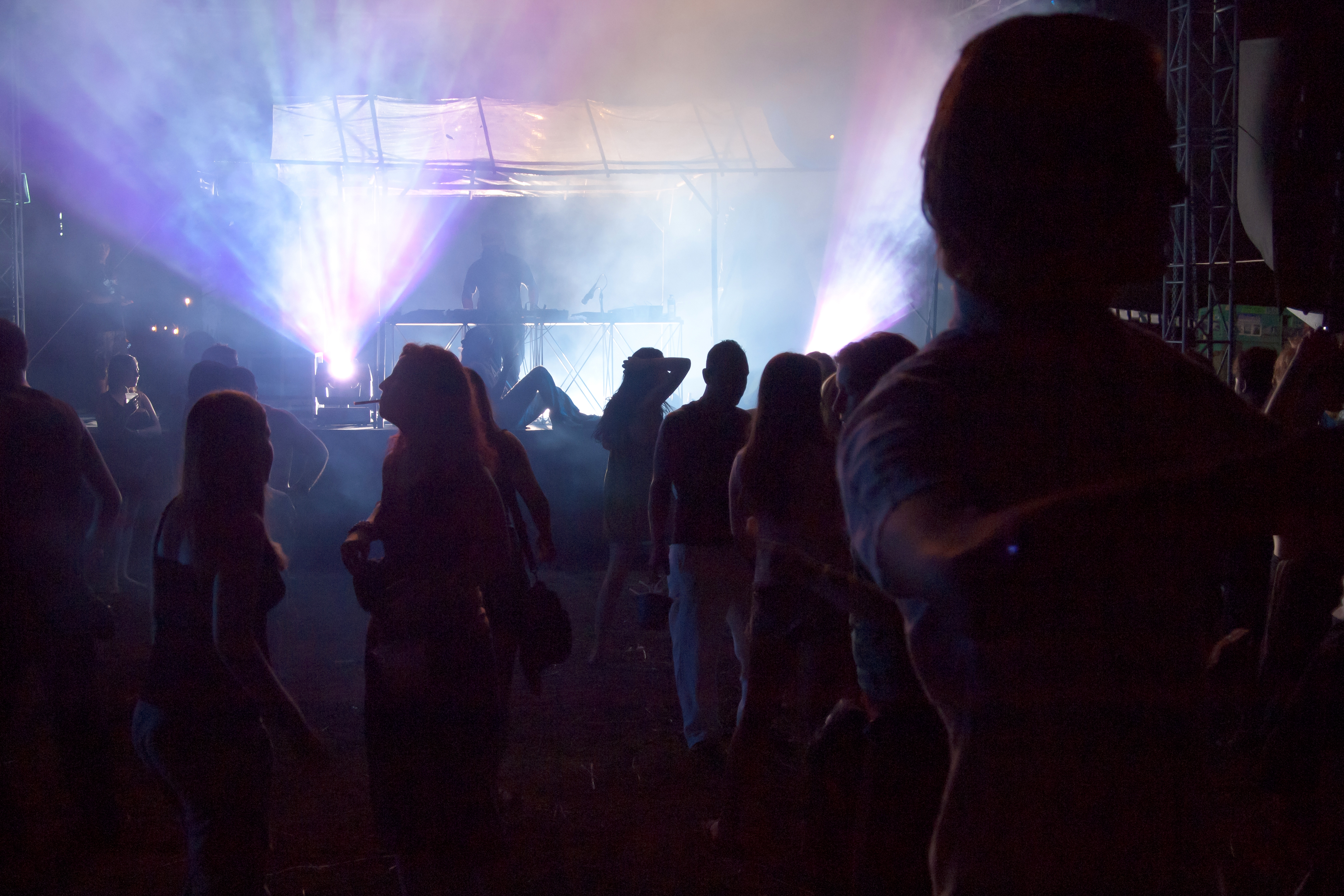
Dance party on the beach, Thailand

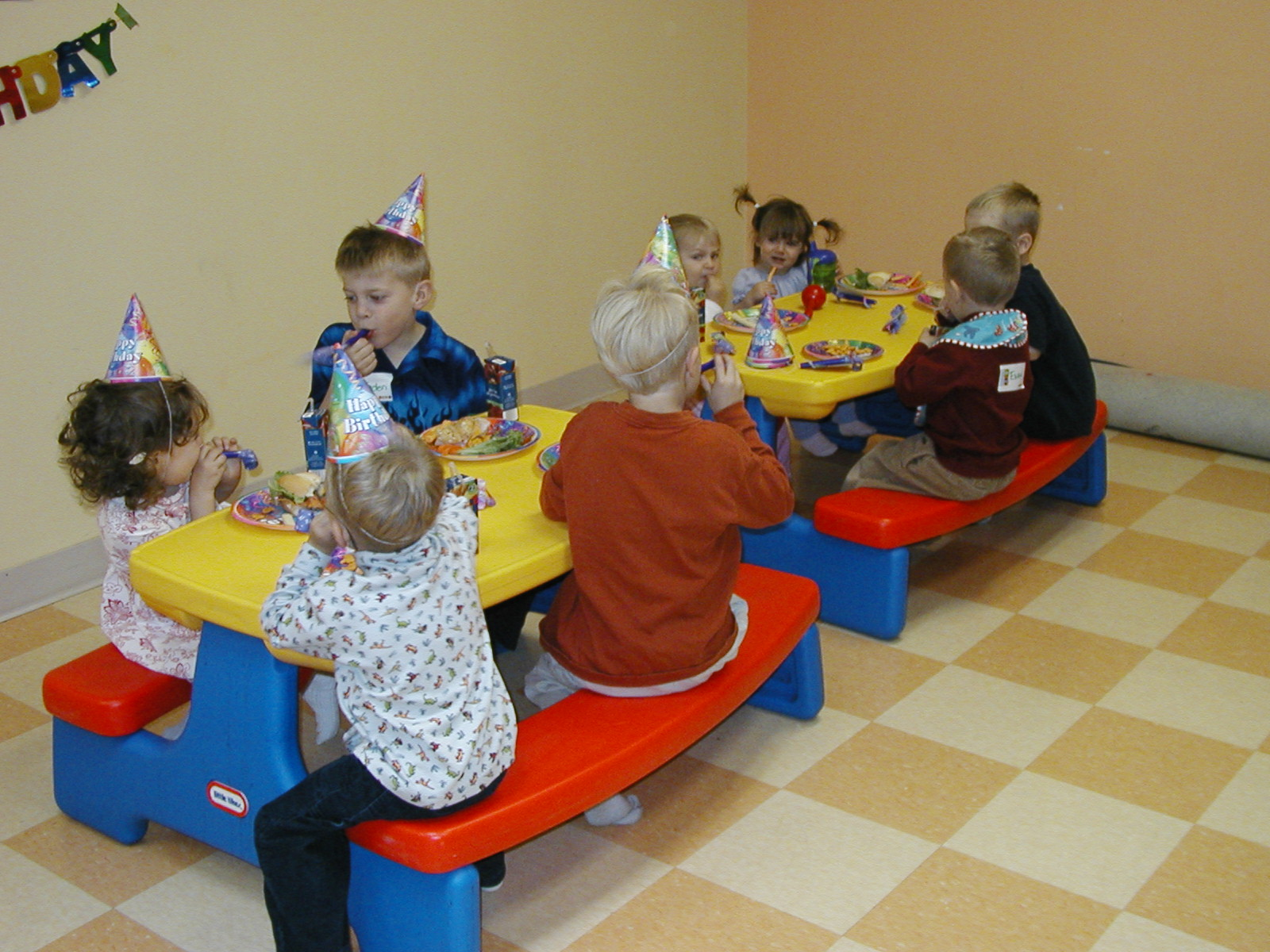
Children at a birthday party

A house party in Denver

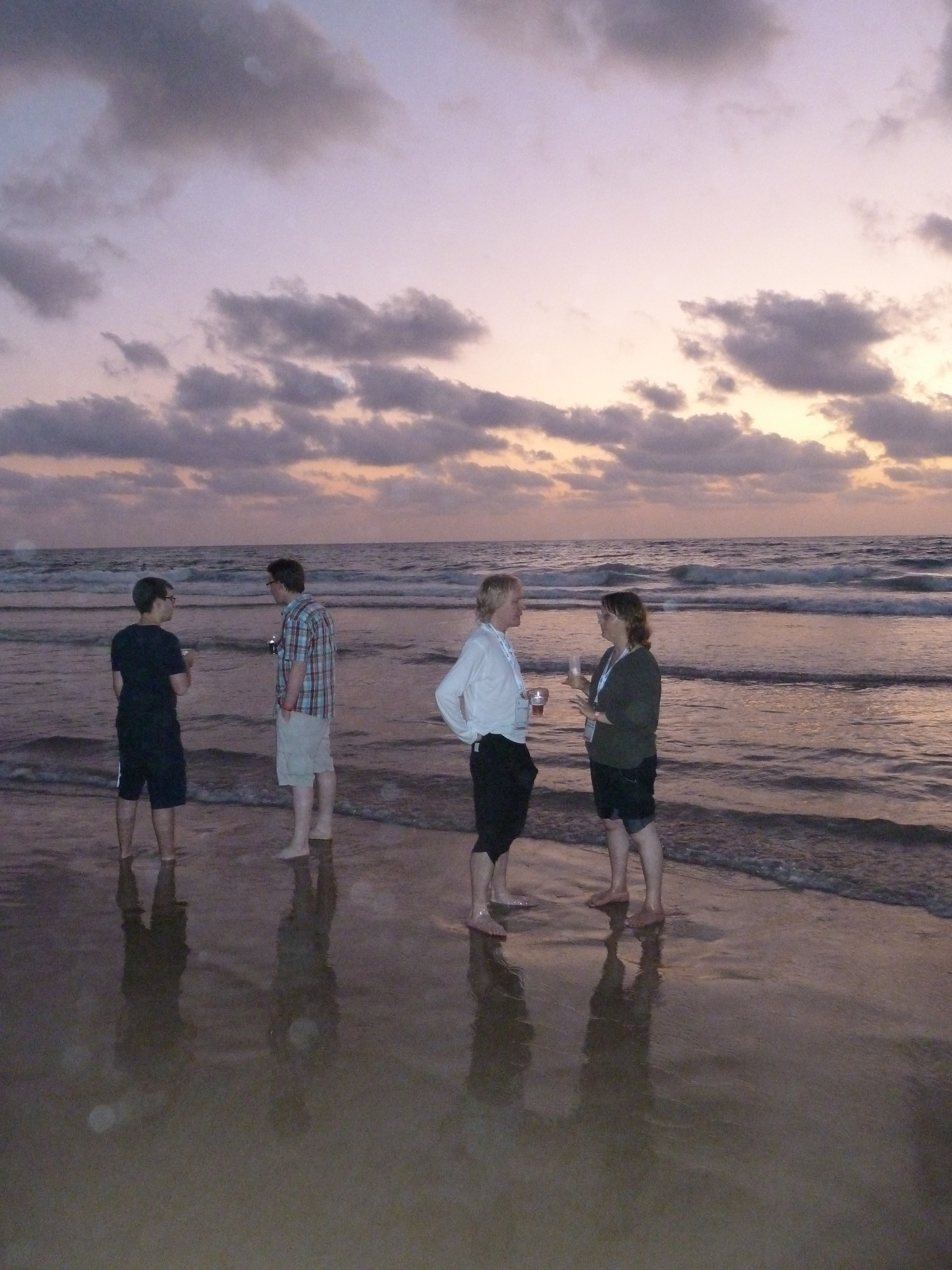
Beach party - Haifa, Israel (2011)

== See also ==
- Cocktail party
- Convention (meeting)
- Crayfish party
- Cuddle party
- Divorce party
- Drinking culture
- Event management
- Event planning
- Festival
- Gate-crashing
- Pizza party
- Naked party
- Rave party
- Sex party
- Spring break
- Veillées
- Wedding party

== Bibliography ==
- Melanie Doderer-Winkler, "Magnificent Entertainments: Temporary Architecture for Georgian Festivals" (London and New Haven, Yale University Press for The Paul Mellon Centre for Studies in British Art, December 2013). ISBN 0300186428 and ISBN 978-0300186420.
- Tung, Jennifer (2005). In Style Parties: The Complete Guide to Easy, Elegant Entertaining. New York: Melcher Media, Inc. ISBN 978-1-932994-11-7.
