= Exotic Erotic Ball =

Annual event in California (1979–2009)

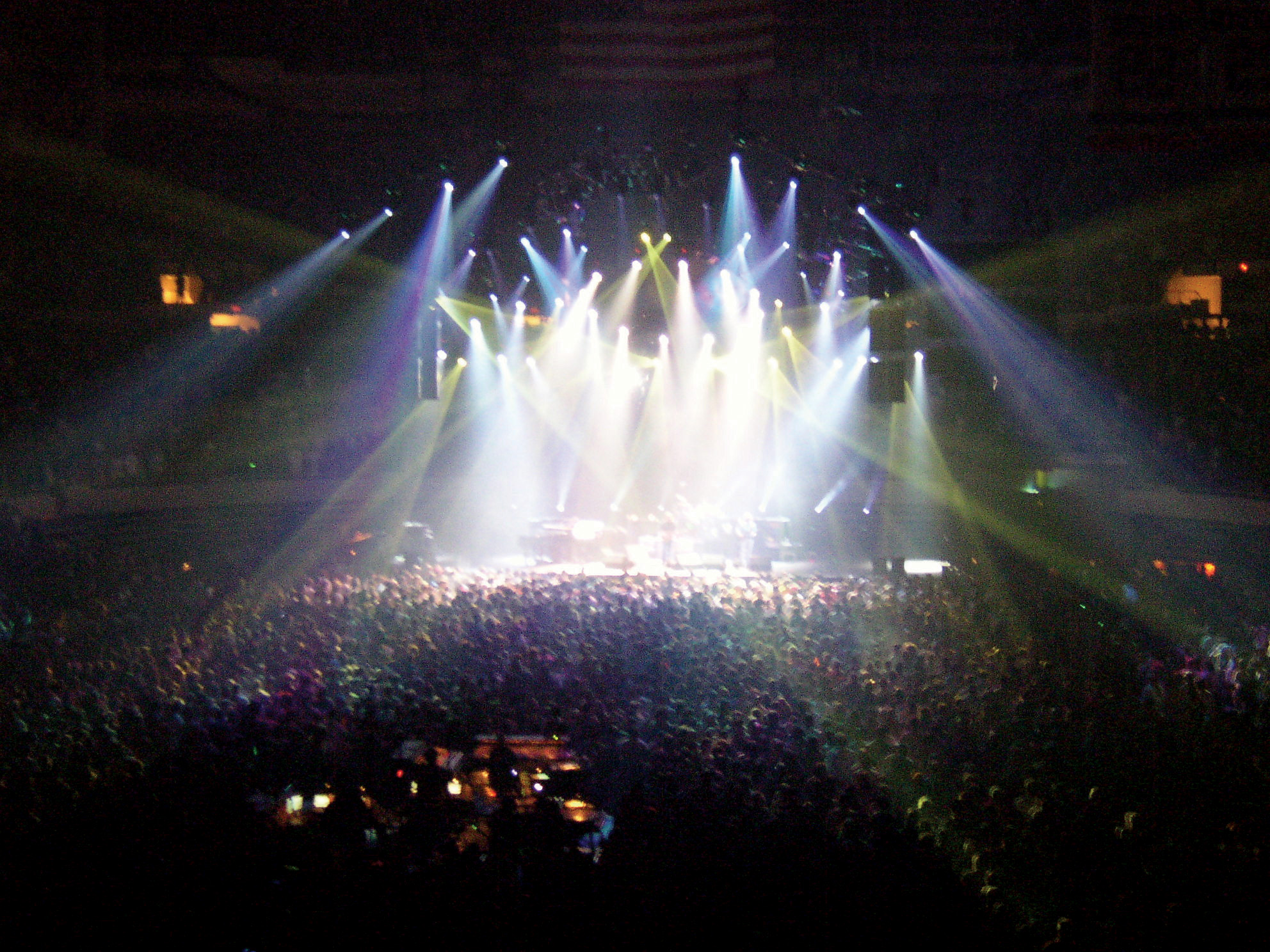
Crowd at a 2006 Exotic Erotic Ball stage

The Exotic Erotic Ball (often referred to as The Ball or Perry Mann's Exotic Erotic Ball) was held annually from 1979 to 2009 on a weekend, usually before Halloween night, in the San Francisco Bay Area, California and was a public, adult-themed event. Over three decades, the annual indoor event was attended by nearly half a million people since its inception with steadily increasing growth in attendance each year until 2010, when the event was cancelled due to poor ticket sales and cost overruns. The 2011 ball was never planned. Due to the worldwide popularity of the event the City of San Francisco issued three proclamations for “Exotic Erotic Ball Day,” twice by Mayor Willie Brown in 1999 and again in 2001, and once by Mayor Gavin Newsom in 2004.

== Description ==
Many attendees of the Exotic Erotic Ball came to the event in elaborate and creative Halloween costumes to compete in the annual “Best Costume” contest which in later years typically awarded the winner prize money and merchandise in the US$10,000 range.

While the Exotic Erotic Ball by definition would be considered a "Festival" the event is rarely categorized into conventional terms by attendees, the media, or event organizers. Because of the broad spectrum of conventional and unconventional entertainment offered on multiple stages at the Exotic Erotic Ball, it may be described as a combination of Adult-themed; Halloween festival, Music Festival, Burlesque show, Lingerie party, Masquerade ball, Fetish club, Swingers party and Adult Industry Trade Show.

== History ==
In 1978, The Nudist Ball, a precursor to the Exotic Erotic Ball, took place in Mann's Tenderloin, San Francisco, California apartment in 1978 and attracted a few hundred people.

In 1979, Perry Mann organized the first Exotic Erotic Ball, moving it to California Hall, in San Francisco, with 800 to 900 people paying $10 apiece, to raise campaign funds for his business partner and best friend, Louis Abolafia, who ran for President of the United States under the Nudist Party with the slogan: “I have nothing to hide.” Louis also coined the phrase, “Make love, not war!” and his legendary Greenwich Village love-ins inspired the New York press to crown him “The Love King.” Abolafia had previously run in 1968 under the Cosmic Love Party, even then with the slogan "What have I got to hide?".

The Concourse Exhibition Center, 635 8th St, San Francisco was a long-time venue.

At least by 1998, the location changed to the Cow Palace in Daly City.

In 2001, Mann released the book The Exotic Erotic Ball: Twenty Years of the World's Sexiest Party (ISBN 156171917X).

From 2004 through 2009, organizers expanded the Exotic Erotic Ball to include the Exotic Erotic Expo, a two-day Adult-Expo typically held the day before and the day of the Exotic Erotic Ball. Activities included panel discussions on First Amendment rights with adult actress, actors, and media, wine tastings with porn stars, and various oddities such as the "spiritual oasis" with psychic readings and massage, body painting, a classic adult cinema, and a human petting zoo. It also features a commercial area with vendors and exhibitors who showcase the latest in exotic fashion, erotic art, adult products, games, websites, and adult novelties.

In 2008, Snoop Dogg headlined a first-ever Friday night concert attached to the Exotic Erotic Ball and Exotic Erotic Expo.

In 2008, Treasure Island, San Francisco event, 26,341 people participated in the combined Exotic Erotic Ball and Exotic Erotic Expo.

In 2009, Art Mann Presents reported from the 2009 Exotic Erotic Ball, with Mistress Harley, celebrating its 30th year.

In 2010, the expo and ball relocated from the Cow Palace to the new Craneway Pavilion in Richmond, California. The move meant that instead of having 20,000 people, organizers would be limited to 14,000 attendees into the Craneway Pavilion on the Richmond waterfront over two days. Organizers expected 7,500 attendees, but canceled the 2010 event the day before it was scheduled to occur, citing poor ticket sales and cost overruns. Many longtime Exotic Erotic Ball attendees were apparently unwilling to travel to Richmond, an industrial city located 25 miles northeast of San Francisco, citing its longtime reputation for being crime-plagued (the city's own police department described Richmond as having a chronic violent crime problem for "decades" and in 2010 was ranked as the 6th most dangerous city in the United States).

In 2011, Howard Mark Mauskopf, 53, the owner of Perry Mann Productions, of Beverly Hills, which put on the 2009 Exotic Erotic Ball at the Cow Palace, faced felony charges for allegedly writing at least $10,000 worth of bad checks and using a fraudulent credit card to cover expenses for the event.

In 2011 and 2012, similar but unrelated events, Masquerotica and the XO Ball & Expo, respectively, filled the void left by the demise of the original Exotic Erotic.

In September 2011, Mann announced that they were "pursuing an international opportunity" and "editing our 30-year documentary" but not producing an event. They did recommend a new event called: Masquerotica, to be held on October 22, 2011, at The Concourse in San Francisco—one of the old Ball's longtime venues. In an announcement posted on the Exotic Erotic Ball's Website, Mann promised, "You'll see a lot of familiar faces ... and other body parts." Masquerotica is produced by different local event producers and other than being recommended by Mann has no affiliation to the Exotic Erotic Ball.

In September 2012, another similar but unrelated event, at Cow Palace, was the XO Ball and Expo.

== Exotic Erotic New Year's Eve Ball ==
For several years, Mann also held an Exotic Erotic New Year's Eve Ball, but discontinued it in 1995.

== Charities ==
The Exotic Erotic Ball fostered strong ties to the San Francisco community. Over the years, the Ball distributed hundreds of thousands of dollars to charities supporting causes such as helping the victims of natural disasters, AIDS, homelessness, domestic violence, child abuse, and has always supported freedom of expression and First Amendment Rights. The Exotic Erotic Ball hosted an annual blood drive with Blood Centers of the Pacific whereby free tickets were offered to those who donated blood.
