= Revealed with Jules Asner =

- Presented by: Jules Asner
- Country of origin: United States
- Original language: English

Original release
- Network: E!
- Release: December 12, 2001 – 2003

Revealed...with Jules Asner is a biography-style television show that first aired on E! Entertainment Television from 2001 to 2003. The host, Jules Asner, was considered one of the most well known personalities on the network, appearing in up to six hours of programming daily. She was the original host of the "Wild On" series and then co-anchor of "E! News Live" with Steve Kmetko. Revealed was a one-on-one interview show with Asner conducting the interviews.

The first three shows in the series profiled Julia Roberts, George Clooney, and Matt Damon. The three episodes premiered back-to-back prior to the E! Live Premiere of Ocean's Eleven. Asner attended the premiere with then-boyfriend (and current husband), Steven Soderbergh. The primetime programming block was a ratings high for the network.

Asner and E! parted company under unhappy circumstances. Asner learned that after interviewing Faith Hill at her home in Nashville, the show's producers had hired a private investigator to 'door knock' Faith Hill's biological mother (whose identity Faith had kept private). Soon after The Los Angeles Times reported that then E! President Mindy Herman stole flowers and gifts sent to Asner. Asking to be let out of her contract, Asner signed a deal with Sony Pictures Television to produce and host a new show. Shortly thereafter she moved to New York City and wed the director Steven Soderbergh.

The show was criticized for its interview questions not being bold enough. In 2003 "Revealed with Jules Asner" was awarded a Gracie Award for Outstanding Interview Program. Mindy Herman accepted the award.
