= Joseph Boucher =

Canadian politician

Joseph Boucher (December 30, 1747 – November 28, 1813) was a farmer and political figure in Lower Canada. He represented Cornwallis, Manitoba in the Legislative Assembly of Lower Canada from 1800 to 1804.

He was born in Rivière-Ouelle, the son of Joseph Boucher and Magdeleine-Salomée Fortin. In 1771, he married Rose Michaud. Boucher served as a captain in the militia. He did not run for reelection to the assembly in 1804. Boucher died in Rivière-Ouelle at the age of 65.

His grand-nephew Jean-Charles Chapais served in the Quebec assembly and the Canadian senate.
