= Logan Lucky =

2017 American heist comedy film by Steven Soderbergh

- Theatrical release poster
- Directed by: Steven Soderbergh
- Written by: Rebecca Blunt
- Produced by: Gregory Jacobs; Mark Johnson; Channing Tatum; Reid Carolin
- Starring: Channing Tatum; Adam Driver; Seth MacFarlane; Riley Keough; Katie Holmes; Katherine Waterston; Dwight Yoakam; Sebastian Stan; Brian Gleeson; Jack Quaid; Hilary Swank; Daniel Craig
- Cinematography: Peter Andrews (Note: Pseudonym for Steven Soderbergh.)
- Edited by: Mary Ann Bernard
- Music by: David Holmes
- Distributed by: Fingerprint Releasing; Bleecker Street
- Release dates: August 9, 2017 (Knoxville); August 18, 2017 (United States)
- Running time: 119 minutes
- Country: United States
- Language: English
- Budget: $29 million
- Box office: $48.5 million

Logan Lucky is a 2017 American comedy film directed by Steven Soderbergh, based on a screenplay credited to Rebecca Blunt. Soderbergh came out of retirement to direct the film and distributed it independently through his own company, Fingerprint Releasing. The film features an ensemble cast consisting of Channing Tatum, Adam Driver, Riley Keough, Daniel Craig, Seth MacFarlane, Katie Holmes, Hilary Swank, Katherine Waterston, and Sebastian Stan. The film follows the Logan family and their attempt to rob the Charlotte Motor Speedway while avoiding both racetrack security and the FBI.

Logan Lucky premiered in Knoxville, Tennessee, on August 9, 2017, and was theatrically released in the United States on August 18, 2017 by Bleecker Street. The film received positive reviews, with many critics praising the cast's performances and Soderbergh's direction, and grossed $48 million worldwide.

== Plot ==
West Virginian Jimmy Logan is laid off from his construction job in the tunnels underneath the Charlotte Motor Speedway in North Carolina for failing to inform the manager about his leg injuries during his football career in high school. He is close to his daughter Sadie, who lives with her mom Bobbie Jo, and Bobbie Jo's wealthy husband Moody. Sadie performs in beauty pageants, and Jimmy's hair stylist sister Mellie, does her hair. Bobbie Jo and Moody plan on moving from Boone County, West Virginia to Lynchburg, Virginia as he plans to open up a new car dealership.

Jimmy goes to a bar tended by his war veteran brother Clyde, who lost his lower arm while he was a soldier in the Iraq War. Max Chilblain, a pretentious NASCAR team owner, makes fun of Clyde's disability, leading to a fight with Jimmy, while Clyde sets fire to Max's car. The next day, Jimmy tells Clyde his plan to rob the speedway, exploiting his knowledge of its underground pneumatic tube system for moving its vast amount of cash.

Clyde and Jimmy recruit Mellie, incarcerated safe-cracker Joe Bang, and Joe's dimwitted younger brothers, Sam and Fish. The team plan to break Joe out of prison and return him later that day. Clyde intentionally gets himself sent to the same prison on a minor charge.

With the unknowing help of Gleema, a woman working at the vault, Sam and Fish infest the Speedway's tube system with painted cockroaches, determining which tubes go to the vault. While gathering supplies, Jimmy meets his former schoolmate Sylvia, who gives him a tetanus shot inside her mobile clinic, which is in need of donations. When Jimmy learns that construction at the speedway is being completed ahead of schedule, they are forced to mount the heist a week earlier, during the much busier Coca-Cola 600 race on Memorial Day weekend.

Joe arranges for fellow inmates to stage a riot, resulting in a lockdown that hides his and Clyde's escape. Mellie meets them in a Ford Shelby GT350 stolen from Moody. At the speedway, Sam and Fish blow up a cell tower to disable the credit card machines, forcing vendors to accept cash only. Clyde, Jimmy and Joe enter the tube room, and Joe uses an explosive improvised from bleach, gummy bears and a dietary salt substitute to blow open the gate from the tube to the vault.

The team connect the tube to a giant vacuum pump, and suck up all the cash into garbage bags. Jimmy accidentally reverses the direction of the vacuum, sucking Clyde's prosthetic arm into the machine. Security guards investigate the smoke from the explosion, but are diverted by Earl, one of Clyde's bar patrons. Sam and Fish get the money out and into Jimmy's truck.

On his way out, Clyde is recognized by Chilblain and hits him, then he and Joe sneak back into the prison disguised as firefighters. Jimmy, having retrieved Clyde’s arm from the machine, makes it to his daughter's pageant just in time to see her perform his favorite song, "Take Me Home, Country Roads." He then abandons the money and anonymously informs the police of its location.

FBI agent Sarah Grayson investigates the heist, dubbed “Ocean's Seven-Eleven" in the press. While she suspects Jimmy, Clyde and Joe, she has no evidence. Due to the prison warden's unwillingness to report the riot, the refuting of Chilblain's eyewitness account by his disgruntled and bitter race driver, Dayton White, and the speedway president's satisfaction with the money's recovery and insurance settlement, the case is closed after six months.

When Joe returns home after prison, he finds a garbage bag of money buried in his yard. Sylvia receives an anonymous donation for her clinic. And the inmate who orchestrated the prison riot and the woman working at the vault each receive an envelope stuffed with cash.

Unknown to Joe and his brothers, Jimmy had filled extra trash bags during the heist, which he hid at the dump to retrieve later. Now working in a Lowe's store and having bought a house near his daughter and ex-wife's home, Jimmy happily reunites with Clyde, Mellie, Joe, and Sylvia at the bar. A patron at the bar is Grayson, who chats up Clyde and shares a toast of drinks with him, saying she's just passing through, but "hoping to stay a while."

== Cast ==
- Channing Tatum as Jimmy Logan, a blue-collar worker whose once-promising football career was ruined by an injury. After being fired from a construction crew at Charlotte Motor Speedway, he devises the plan to rob the speedway. He is Clyde and Mellie's brother and Sadie's father.
- Adam Driver as Clyde Logan, Jimmy's brother and a bartender. He served two tours in Iraq and has lost the lower part of his left arm, causing him to wear a prosthetic.
- Daniel Craig as Joe Bang, a criminal known for his safe-cracking experience. He has ties to the Logan family and is enlisted by Jimmy and Clyde to create an explosion during the robbery.
- Riley Keough as Mellie Logan, Jimmy and Clyde's car-savvy sister, who works at a hair salon and assists her brothers with the robbery, and Sadie in preparing for her pageant.
- Katie Holmes as Bobbie Jo Chapman, Jimmy's ex-wife and Sadie's mother.
- Farrah Mackenzie as Sadie Logan, the daughter of Jimmy and Bobbie Jo and a child beauty pageant contestant.
- Katherine Waterston as Sylvia Harrison, a former schoolmate of Jimmy who runs a mobile clinic.
- Dwight Yoakam as Warden Burns, the warden of Monroe County Penitentiary, where Joe and Clyde are imprisoned.
- Seth MacFarlane as Max Chilblain, a pretentious British businessman who has created a drink called "To the Max". He sponsors down-on-his-luck driver Dayton White.
- Sebastian Stan as Dayton White, a NASCAR driver who prides himself on his physical fitness and preparation.
- Brian Gleeson as Sam Bang, one of Joe's two younger brothers.
- Jack Quaid as Fish Bang, one of Joe's two younger brothers.
- Hilary Swank as Sarah Grayson, an FBI agent assigned to investigate the robbery.
- David Denman as Moody Chapman, Bobbie Jo's husband and the owner of multiple car dealerships.
- Jim O'Heir as Cal, the head of the construction crew at the Speedway.
- Macon Blair as Brad Noonan, Sarah's partner in the investigation.
- Charles Halford as Earl, a mechanic who assists the Logans.
- Fox NASCAR commentators as themselves:
  - Jeff Gordon
  - Darrell Waltrip
  - Mike Joy
  - Adam Alexander

Six other NASCAR drivers make cameo appearances in the film. Carl Edwards and Kyle Busch are West Virginia state troopers, Brad Keselowski and Joey Logano are security guards, Kyle Larson is a limousine driver, and Ryan Blaney is a delivery boy. LeAnn Rimes and Jesco White also make cameo appearances.

== Production ==
=== Development ===
Soderbergh's Behind the Candelabra (2013) was intended to be his final film as director. Soderbergh has said that he was initially given the Logan Lucky script in hopes that he could recommend a suitable director for the project, but he enjoyed reading it and decided to take it on for himself, specifically noting that it was an "anti-glam version of an Ocean's movie". He told Entertainment Weekly: "Nobody dresses nice. Nobody has nice stuff. They have no money. They have no technology. It's all rubber band technology." At the time, Soderbergh was also theorizing a new distribution model and felt that the script gave him the perfect opportunity to do so.

=== Casting ===
The film was announced in February 2016, along with Channing Tatum's casting. Variety initially reported that Matt Damon was also to star, although Deadline Hollywood reported the same day that Damon was not involved, but rather Michael Shannon. Shannon later left the project due to scheduling conflicts. Much of the rest of the cast was announced between that May and August, among them Seth MacFarlane, Adam Driver and Daniel Craig in May, Hilary Swank in June, and Jim O'Heir in August.

=== Screenplay ===
There has been media speculation regarding the identity of the film's screenwriter, Rebecca Blunt. The film's production notes state that she is a native of Logan, West Virginia who now lives in New York City, and that she is a first-time screenwriter. No one other than Soderbergh and Adam Driver has personally vouched for her existence. Some people involved with the film have exchanged emails with a person they believed to be her, and think that she lives in the United Kingdom. Sources speculated that "Rebecca Blunt" was actually a pseudonym for Soderbergh's wife Jules Asner, for comedian John Henson, or for Soderbergh himself. According to The Playlist, Asner was the sole screenwriter and chose to use a pseudonym because she did not want the perception of the film to be that "Soderbergh was directing his wife's script." Soderbergh denied the claim that Rebecca Blunt was not a real person.

=== Filming ===
Logan Lucky began filming on August 24, 2016. Production lasted 36 days, with much of the photography taking place at the Charlotte Motor Speedway and Atlanta Motor Speedway during the NASCAR race meetings at both circuits. The Atlanta outside barriers were repainted yellow, in an attempt to resemble Charlotte; the Charlotte track had yellow walls owing to then NASCAR's premiership title sponsor Sprint (they have since been replaced with white walls); Atlanta has white walls with red and blue pattern for Folds of Honor, the charity that is involved with (now spring) race sponsor QuikTrip. The scenes with the Fox commentators inside the commentary box were shot in Atlanta, because in Charlotte, the commentators are typically positioned on top of the grandstand roof for opening broadcast scenes and also since the road course can be seen from the Charlotte commentary box.

== Music ==
David Holmes composed the score for Logan Lucky, having previously scored other Soderbergh films, including Out of Sight, the Ocean's Trilogy, and Haywire. The soundtrack was released by Milan Records; it includes the cue "Original Score Medley" by David Holmes, and music by various artists. The film features "Flashing Lights" by Screaming Lord Sutch and Heavy Friends.

== Release ==
Fingerprint Releasing and Bleecker Street released the film on August 18, 2017. Logan Lucky is the first film distributed by Fingerprint Releasing, which Soderbergh created to distribute films independently, instead of through big studios. The distributors spent $20 million on prints and advertising.

=== Home media ===
Logan Lucky was released on digital download on November 14, 2017, and on DVD, Blu-ray, and Ultra HD Blu-ray on November 28, 2017.

== Reception ==
=== Box office ===
Logan Lucky grossed $27.8 million in the United States and Canada, and $19.8 million in other territories, for a worldwide total of $47.5 million, against a production budget of $29 million.

In North America, the film was released alongside The Hitman's Bodyguard as well as the wide expansion of Wind River, and was projected to gross $7–9 million from 3,008 theaters in its opening weekend. Having already covered the cost of the production budget through international advance sales, and the costs of prints and advertising through a deal with Amazon, Soderbergh said a debut of $15 million would be needed to be considered a success. The film grossed $2.8 million on its first day (including $525,000 from Thursday night previews). It went on to open to $7.6 million, finishing third at the box office, behind The Hitman's Bodyguard and Annabelle: Creation. In its second weekend, the film took in $4.2 million, dropping 44.2% and finishing 5th, in what was the lowest combined grossing weekend (for the top 10 films) since September 2001. During the following weekend, which preceded Labor Day, the film made $4.4 million over three days (an increase of 4%), and an estimated $5.5 million over the four-day weekend. It was again part of a historically low weekend, as it was the worst combined holiday weekend since 1998.

=== Critical response ===
On review aggregation website Rotten Tomatoes, the film holds an approval rating of 92% based on reviews from 288 critics, with an average rating of 7.5/10. The website's critical consensus reads: "High-octane fun that's smartly assembled without putting on airs, Logan Lucky marks a welcome end to Steven Soderbergh's retirement — and proves he hasn't lost his ability to entertain." On Metacritic, which assigns a weighted average rating to reviews, the film has a score of 78 out of 100, based on reviews from 51 critics, indicating "generally favorable" reviews. Audiences polled by CinemaScore gave the film an average grade of "B" on an A+ to F scale, while PostTrak reported filmgoers gave it an 80% overall positive score.

Owen Gleiberman of Variety gave the film a positive review, writing: "Steven Soderbergh's Logan Lucky is a high-spirited, low-down blast." Todd McCarthy of The Hollywood Reporter gave the film a positive review, saying: "This is a good-times film that doesn't put on airs, dress to impress or pretend to be something it isn't. It just aims to please and does a pretty good job of it." Matt Zoller Seitz of RogerEbert.com gave the film three-and-a-half out of four stars, praising the smooth direction and efficiency of storytelling Soderbergh brought to the film, and stating that other than needing additional scenes to give its "oddball characters" more depth, Logan Lucky is “precision-tooled entertainment made by experts, and sometimes more than that. Watching it is like finding money in the pocket of a coat that you haven't worn in years." Peter Travers of Rolling Stone called it "a terrific, twisty, funny-as-hell crime flick about so-called hicks who decide that making America great again starts right at home." Richard Roeper of the Chicago Sun-Times wrote: "Logan Lucky is great fun and one of the most purely entertaining movies of the year."

Rex Reed of The New York Observer was critical of the film, and described Soderbergh as an overrated director. Reed complained that the film takes a slower pace than Ocean's Eleven, and although he praised the camera work, music and ham acting, he concluded: "It doesn't work. Logan Lucky is as charming and welcome as toenail fungus."
