= Jules Asner =

Television personality and model

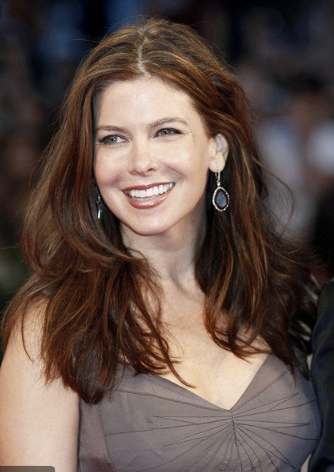
- Asner at Venice Film Festival 2012
- Born: Julie Ann White; February 14, 1968 (age 58); Tempe, Arizona, U.S.
- Other name: Rebecca Blunt
- Occupations: Entertainment journalist, former fashion model
- Television: Revealed with Jules Asner
- Spouse(s): Matthew Asner (m. 1992; div. 1996) Steven Soderbergh (m. 2003)

Jules Asner (born Julie Ann White; February 14, 1968) is an American screenwriter, author, former entertainment journalist, television personality, and model.

== Early life ==
Asner was born Julie Ann White in Tempe, Arizona. At age 16, she was discovered at a modeling convention in Scottsdale, Arizona. She began her career as an Elite model. She shared a bunk-room with Cindy Crawford during the early years of her career. In 1986, she graduated from McClintock High School in Tempe. She graduated from UCLA with a degree in political science.

== Career ==
Asner was a longtime E! personality. During her peak with the network, she hosted six hours of programming daily. Among the series she hosted were Revealed with Jules Asner, E! News Live and Wild On!. She also hosted many live specials. Asner received a Prism Award for her interview show Revealed with Jules Asner.

Before joining E! Asner was an entertainment reporter for Reuters Television Good Morning England, The Entertainment Show on Sky Television, and Extra. She hosted Live by Request on A&E and was a segment director and producer on Hard Copy.

Miramax Books purchased the publishing rights to her first novel, Whacked. The novel recounts the story of a woman who plots revenge on a former lover. Asner said that the plot was based on a breakup she'd been through. Released on June 3, 2008,

Asner wrote the screenplay for husband Steven Soderbergh's film Logan Lucky. She chose to use the pseudonym Rebecca Blunt because she did not want the "story" surrounding the film to be that "Soderbergh was directing his wife's script." In 2018, a Twitter account belonging to TheRebeccaBlunt posted photos of Asner and Soderbergh behind the scenes working on Logan Lucky. Asner previously did uncredited rewrite work on Magic Mike and several of Soderbergh's other films.

== Personal life ==
From 1992 to 1996, she was married to Matthew Asner and took his surname, making her the daughter-in-law of actor Ed Asner.

She married film director Steven Soderbergh in their New York apartment on May 10, 2003. Soderbergh often credits his wife with influencing his female characters.
