= Quêteux =

Type of vagrant in Quebec, Canada

The quêteux was a type of vagrant in Quebec, Canada. Quêteux depended on strangers' charity for their livelihood, although they would also work, tell stories, give news and play music. Quêteux were often well-liked by villagers.

They are present in Québécois folklore and art. They were said to be able to curse people.

== History ==
Quêteux lived a nomadic lifestyle, going from village to village along a preestablished route. They generally preferred small villages as poorer villagers were more generous. They remembered where they had been well received, perhaps even giving each other the address of generous hosts. Quêteux could be men or women, and entire families could be quêteux. The quêteux tradition has its roots in the troubadour of medieval France.

Quêteux asked for "charity in the name of the Good Lord". They were handed some money, given a meal or were hosted. Rather than by charity, quêteux were often helped to ease one's conscience and because of superstition.

The quêteux were often well-liked by the villagers. The quêteux would tell news and stories to villagers and thus gained remuneration. He could also gain money or payback his hosts by performing menial tasks. Some also played music. Quêteux were at the heart of veillées (traditional nights of celebration in Quebec) when present. Some quêteux were highly trusted and could be depended on for carrying letters.

Some quêteux were disliked by villagers. The quêteux from Saint-Gervais were known for their laziness. They would smoke pipes and rest during the harvest, and if asked to work, would claim to make more money by begging.

The quêteux could eat and stay at different homes within a single day. He was given supplies for the road. When a quêteux's bag grew too heavy, he sold some of its content for money.

The banc de quêteux (Quêteux's bed; a bed-bench) was given to the quêteux for sleeping when it was not used by a family's children. They would be placed at the home's entrance. The quêteux would otherwise sleep on a palliasse, a cart hide or the dog's carpet near the stove. Molasses was apparently placed around the palliasse to avoid lice from spreading (but that was likely a legend), and the palliasse was burned the following morning.

The quêteux was well-known in his parish, where he had a shack. He often had a nickname. When he lacked supplies, he usually got some from his neighbors. He was sometimes given menial tasks in exchange of remuneration.

There was some distrust against quêteux from outside the parish. During economic crises, villagers were more reluctant to help quêteux from outside their parish as the number of quêteux increased.

Quêteux would sometimes permanently stay at homes after staying there for a winter.

The quêteux eventually disappeared after begging from door to door was outlawed in the 1960s and became the modern homeless.

== Folklore ==
In Quebec folklore, the quêteux is a footloose vagrant. He is generally an older man lacking family, home, parish and work. Usually, he is humble, resigned and discreet.

However, quêteux could be hostile in rare cases, cursing those who had wronged them. Quêteux could dry off cows, make horses limp, turn bread into rock, render someone unconscious, kill animals and give lice.

The quêteux is relatable by his lack of means, but only partially due to a difference in degree. His hardships put into perspective one's daily struggles. The quêteux's place in Quebec folklore was likely brought about by the predominance of catholicism in Québec : he could be used to promote the values of love and charity.

For protection against a quêteux, one had to tell them Ouvrez! (Open!) instead of Entrez! (Enter!) or boil needles. In Trois-Rivières, saying À pretio, je te redoute! would also protect oneself from quêteux. Frying needles in oil could take off a quêteux's curse.

The quêteux is featured in many artistic works of Quebec; in cinema, literature and music.

== Examples of quêteux ==
- Ti-Jean Gagnon
- Adelme Porlier
- Thomas Pomerleau
- William Tremblay
