= Taradise =

- Also known as: Wild On Tara!
- Genre: Reality/Travel
- Presented by: Tara Reid
- Country of origin: United States
- Original language: English
- No. of seasons: 1
- No. of episodes: 10

Production
- Camera setup: Single-camera
- Running time: 25 minutes

Original release
- Network: E!
- Release: August 10, 2005 – 2006

Related
- Wild On!

Taradise (also known as Wild On Tara!) is an American reality series hosted by actress Tara Reid that aired on E! from August 10, 2005, to 2006.

== Overview ==
Taradise was originally intended to be a new season of E!'s long-running series Wild On!, with Reid as the new host. A week before the season began, E! changed the title to Taradise and re-edited the series as a reality show based around Reid instead of Wild On's format as more of a travelogue show. Reid visited destinations such as Spain, Greece, Italy, France, and Monaco, where she sampled the local cuisine, visited nightclubs, and shopped.

== Cancellation ==
The show was part of E!'s lineup, with new episodes premiering Wednesdays at 10 p.m. EST. In September 2005, E! announced that it was canceling the series due to production complications that arose from the shooting. According to E! president Ted Harbert, "The show was incredibly difficult to produce with someone well-known".
