= Veillée (Quebec) =

Secular festive occasions in Quebec, Canada

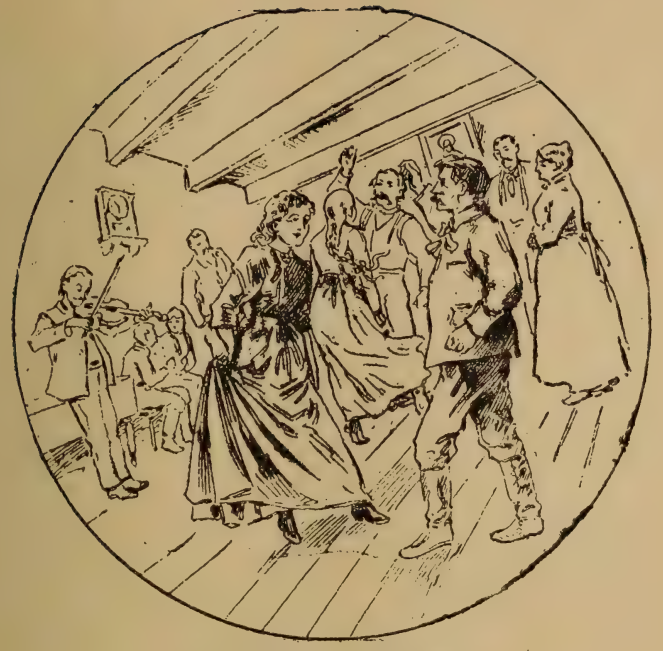

Veillées are secular festive occasions in Quebec, Canada during which attendees (called veilleux) dance, sing or listen to stories. Veillées used to accompany important holidays and celebration. They date back to New France.

== Description ==
The veillée tradition started around 1725-1750, in New France. Some soldiers spent the winter in inhabitants' homes. During the day, they worked; during the night, they would go from farm to farm looking for good company for partying, thus starting the veillées. Previously, men and women preferred entertaining themselves by going to the cabaret.

The practice of the veillée was further popularized in the mid-18th century with the arrival of soldiers from Montcalm's regiments. The veillée as it is known comes from this period, and was anchored as a popular tradition by the growing economic means of the colony's inhabitants. The veillée was purely recreative in New France (Note: Although they would still do domestic work during veillées in Acadia during the 19th century.), unlike in France where people would meet to share lighting, have fun and work.

Veillées were very common during winter, between epiphany and lent. The carnival was not celebrated in French Canada as it was in Europe, likely due to the harsh weather. French Canadians instead preferred celebrating inside, in veillées.

Veillées would accompany multiple holidays and celebrations. There was a veillée on Christmas night, at the home of the oldest married sister, and on the New Year's Eve, at the paternal home. There would also be veillées de chant or veillées de danse at lent and after épluchettes de blé d'Inde (Note: Traditional celebration during which participants husked corn.). Friends and family were invited to veillées.

The traditional veillée was still practiced in the early 20th century, although they started to be considered as an old traditional practice and celebrated as such.

Participants to a veillée were called veilleux.

== Types ==
=== Veillée de danse ===
The veillées de danse (lit. 'dance veillées'), during which attendees dance, were the most popular type of veillée. Dancing was enjoyed by all; rich and poor; old and young. French dances were featured, and so were "English" dances learnt from the Scottish or Irish from 1760 onward. Different types of dances would sometimes mix.Dances featured at a veillée de danse included the quadrille, the gigue, the minuet, the rigodon and the reel. All of them except the gigue were danced in couples.

The next figure would be screamed by the dancers themselves or by a câleur (Note: Verb form: câler), except during a gigue, in which case there would be no screams and the dancers would be encouraged by spectators. If space was lacking, attendees would take turns dancing.

The preferred instrument during a veillée was the violin, played by a hired violoneux. If there were no violin, then a jaw harp was used. Where there were no jaw harp, music would be whistled or sung. In wealthier circles, a piano would replace the violin. Tin spoons could also be played. The musicians had to be able to play for the veillée's duration (usually, three or four hours).

Not everyone would dance during the veillée de danse. Some talked, watched the dancers or played games.

Dancing and veillées de danse were criticized by the clergy and religious literature.

=== Veillée de chants ===
During the veillées de chants (lit. 'songs veillées'), attendees would sing.

The songs performed during veillées de chants were extremely diverse. There were ballads, laments, stories, lais and chansons à répons (Note: Not to be confused with chansons à répondre. In a chanson à répondre, a group would repeat a "leader's" lyrics; in a chanson à répons, two people would sing a dialogue while facing each other, standing up, in the middle of attendees. The chanson à répons was the most popular type of song while in company of others), which would elicit a wide range of emotions.

=== Veillée de contes ===
During the veillées de contes (lit. 'tales veillées'), stories (contes) are told by a conteur (storyteller). The conteur often came from a neighboring locality, but some came from far away and would rely on storytelling to earn a living (sometimes, a quêteux). A good conteur had a repertoire of stories to tell.

The conteur's performance could last hours. Silence was expected during the performance. The conteur used an expressive and theatrical style full of stylistic devices. After finishing a tale, conteurs would take questions from the audience.
