= Oscar Abolafia =

American photographer (1935–2020)

- Born: 27 July 1935
- Died: 30 March 2020 (aged 84)
- Occupation: Photographer

Oscar Abolafia (July 27, 1935 – March 30, 2020) was an American photographer known for his images of celebrities that appeared in many prominent magazines in the 1960s, 1970s and 1980s.

Abolafia, the descendant of a Turkish Sefardi Jewish immigrant family, grew up in New York City. Abolafia and his brother Louis Abolafia came to prominence in 1968 when Louis "ran" for President of the United States as "the Naked Candidate", with Oscar providing the advertising imagery for Louis' "campaign".

Abolafia photographed the rich and famous including the Kennedy family, Jim Morrison, Andy Warhol, Michael Jackson, Elizabeth Taylor, Jack Nicholson, Linda Blair, Audrey Hepburn, and Elvis Presley. He also worked for People Magazine, Vanity Fair and Harper’s Bazaar. He took pictures backstage at The Tonight Show and worked as a still photographer for over twenty movies including John and Mary, A Bridge Too Far, Moonraker, The Seduction of Joe Tynan, Bear Island, Cuba, Eyewitness, Private Lessons, For Your Eyes Only, Shock Treatment, So Fine, Annie, Octopussy, Against All Odds, The Last Dragon, A View to a Kill, Death Wish 3, Barnum (1986), Keeping Track (1986), Forever, Lulu (1986), 3 Men and a Baby, The Girl in a Swing, Slaves of New York, If Lucy Fell, Jingle All the Way, One Fine Day, The Devil's Advocate, Titanic, and Celebrity.

In 1970 Abolafia married Joanna. They lived together in New York City.

== Sources ==
- Koppel, Lily (10 February 2008). "In an Era of Glitz, a Witness With Panache". The New York Times.
- "Photos from 1960s and 70s NYC". The Leonard Lopate Show. WNYC. 2 September 2008.
