= Louis Abolafia =

Artist who ran for President of the United States

Louis “Lou” Abolafia
- Louis Abolafia holding a campaign-related sign during his run for the United States Presidency
- Born: February 23, 1941; New York City, U.S.
- Died: October 30, 1995 (aged 54); Los Angeles, California, U.S.
- Other names: Yehudah Leib Eliezer, Sabalafia, The Caped Crusader of Peace, The Co-opt King, The Love Candidate, The Love King, Reverend
- Occupations: Artist, social activist, political candidate
- Known for: Satirical campaigns for President of the United States, countercultural performance art

Louis "Lou" Abolafia (February 23, 1941 – October 30, 1995) was an American artist, social activist, and countercultural figure of Sephardic Jewish heritage, renowned for his innovative performance art, satirical political campaigns, and influential presence in the Greenwich Village scene of the 1960s.

== Early life ==
Abolafia was the youngest of four children, with two older brothers one being photographer to the stars Oscar Abolafia and one older sister, born to New York City florist Issac Abolafia and his wife Pearl “Penina” Fisz. His family was of Jewish heritage, descended from Sephardic Jews expelled from Spain in 1492. Later generations lived in the eastern Mediterranean, with relatives residing in the Greek cities of Salonika and Patras and in the Ottoman Empire (modern-day Republic of Türkiye) territories of Smyrna (modern-day İzmir) and Gallipoli from which Louis’ Paternal Grandfather Victor “Vital” Abolafia had migrated from and to The Bronx, New York eventually settling in the Manhattan, New York neighborhood Greenwich Village.

== Career ==
In the 1960s, Abolafia became part of the Greenwich Village art scene. He organized love-ins and happenings blending music, poetry, and audience participation, which earned him the nickname "The Love King." A long-time resident of the Lower East Side, he ran a storefront studio in the East Village that doubled as a shelter for wayward youths and transients.

From 1967 to 1970 he published the countercultural newspaper Abolafia’s Luv and staged several art exhibitions. During this period he befriended major cultural figures, including Bob Dylan, artist Yayoi Kusama—with whom he staged performance art weddings, Allen Ginsberg, Andy Warhol and members of The Factory, Canadian socialite Margaret Trudeau, and Satsvarūpa Dāsa Gosvāmī, senior disciple of A. C. Bhaktivedanta Swami Prabhupada, founder of the Hare Krishna movement.

According to a 2021 interview published in Contemporary Art Review Los Angeles (CARLA), Abolafia and Dylan privately remarked to friends that they shared Sabbatean heritage through their Sephardic ancestry.

In 1980, Abolafia co-created the Exotic Erotic Ball with Perry Mann in San Francisco. The first event, held in 1979 at Mann’s apartment, was originally a fundraiser for Abolafia’s campaign; it grew into an annual gathering that ran for over three decades until 2010. He is sometimes credited with coining the phrase "Make love, not war", though the attribution remains disputed.

Abolafia was also described as a "descendant of the Abolafias—writers of the Kabbala."

== Political campaigns ==
Abolafia’s public notoriety came from his satirical runs for political office. He first ran for Mayor of New York City in 1967 under the "Cosmic Love Party" and in 1968 for President of the United States on the "Love Ticket," also known as the Nudist Party. His campaigns often used nudity as a symbol of honesty and transparency.

== Death ==
Louis Abolafia died of a heart attack in Los Angeles, California, on October 30, 1995, at the age of 54. Reports noted the presence of benzodiazepine in his system at the time of death. He was survived by his mother, two brothers, his sister, a son, a grandson, and his wife, whom he had married one year prior to his death.
