= Rivière-Ouelle =

- Municipality
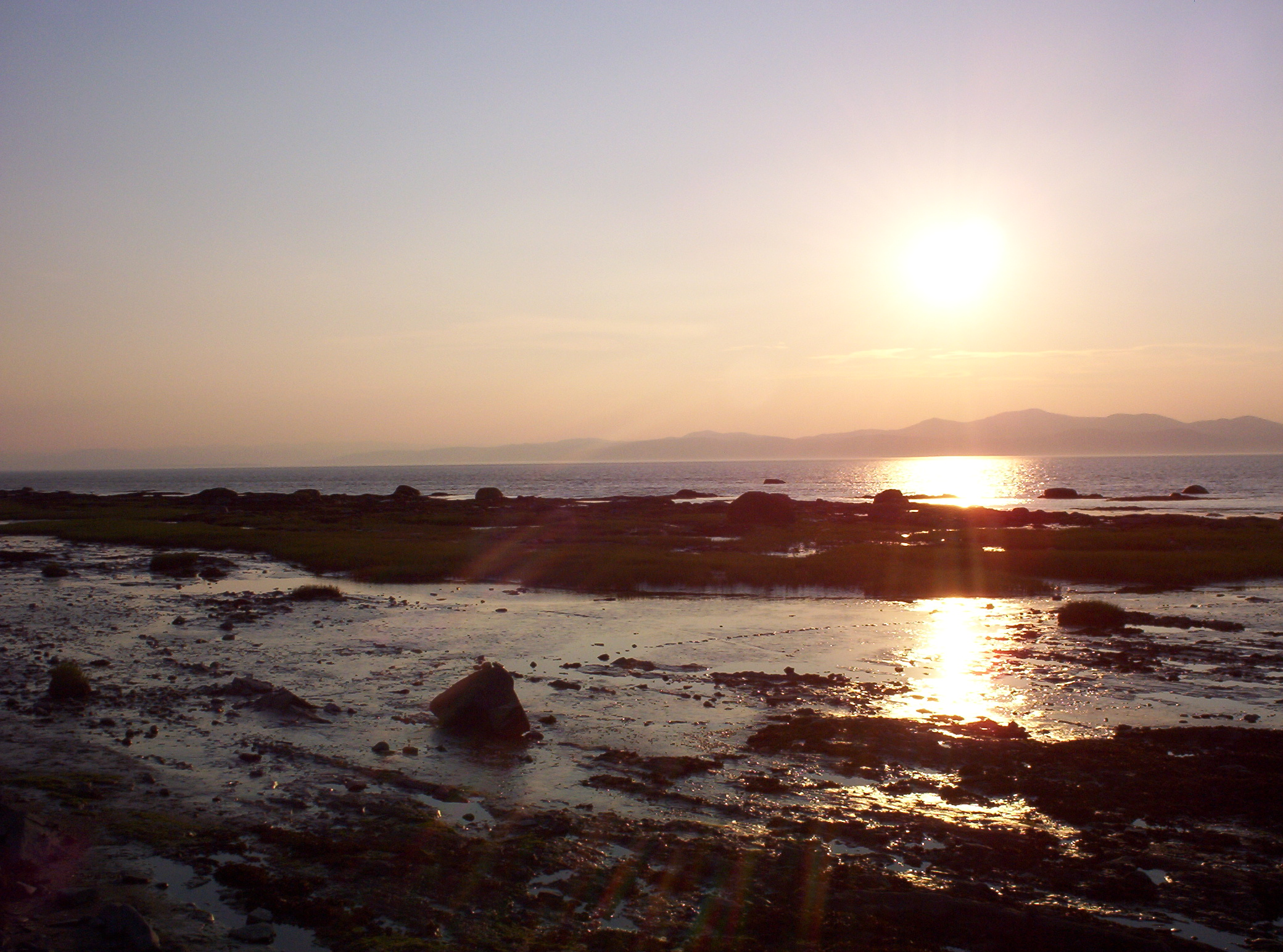
- Sunset on St Lawrence River in Rivière-Ouelle

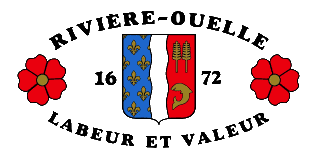
- Flag Coat of arms

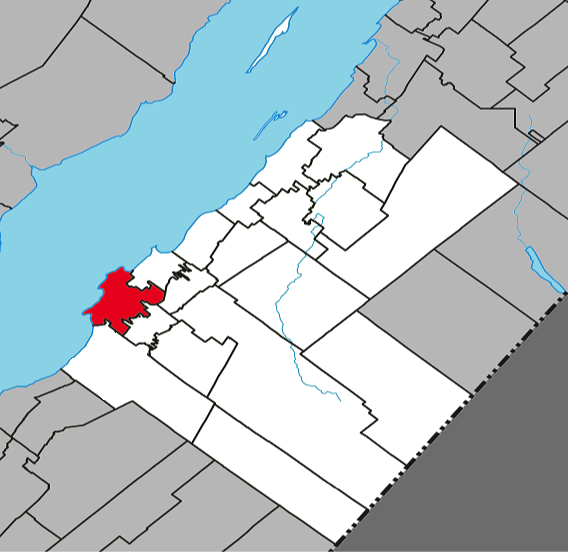
- Location within Kamouraska RCM

- Location in eastern Quebec
- Coordinates: 47°26′N 70°01′W
- Country: Canada
- Province: Quebec
- Region: Bas-Saint-Laurent
- RCM: Kamouraska
- Constituted: July 1, 1855

Government
  - Mayor: Gilles Martin
  - Federal riding: Côte-du-Sud—Rivière-du-Loup—Kataskomiq—Témiscouata
  - Prov. riding: Côte-du-Sud

Area
  - Total: 147.10 km^{2} (56.80 sq mi)
  - Land: 57.50 km^{2} (22.20 sq mi)

Population (2021)
  - Total: 995
  - Density: 17.3/km^{2} (45/sq mi)
  - Pop 2016-2021: ▲2.6%
  - Dwellings: 626
- Time zone: UTC−5 (EST)
  - Summer (DST): UTC−4 (EDT)
- Postal code(s): G0L 2C0
- Area codes: 418 and 581
- Highways: A-20 (TCH); R-132; R-230
- Website: www.riviereouelle.ca

Rivière-Ouelle (French pronunciation: [ʁivjɛʁ wɛl]) is a town located in the Kamouraska Regional County Municipality within the Bas-Saint-Laurent region of Quebec. It is located on the Saint Lawrence River; the Ouelle River flows through the town. It was part of the seignory of La Bouteillerie, once owned by Charles Deschamps de Boishébert et de Raffetot. Jean-Charles Chapais, a Father of Canadian Confederation, was born here.

== Geography ==
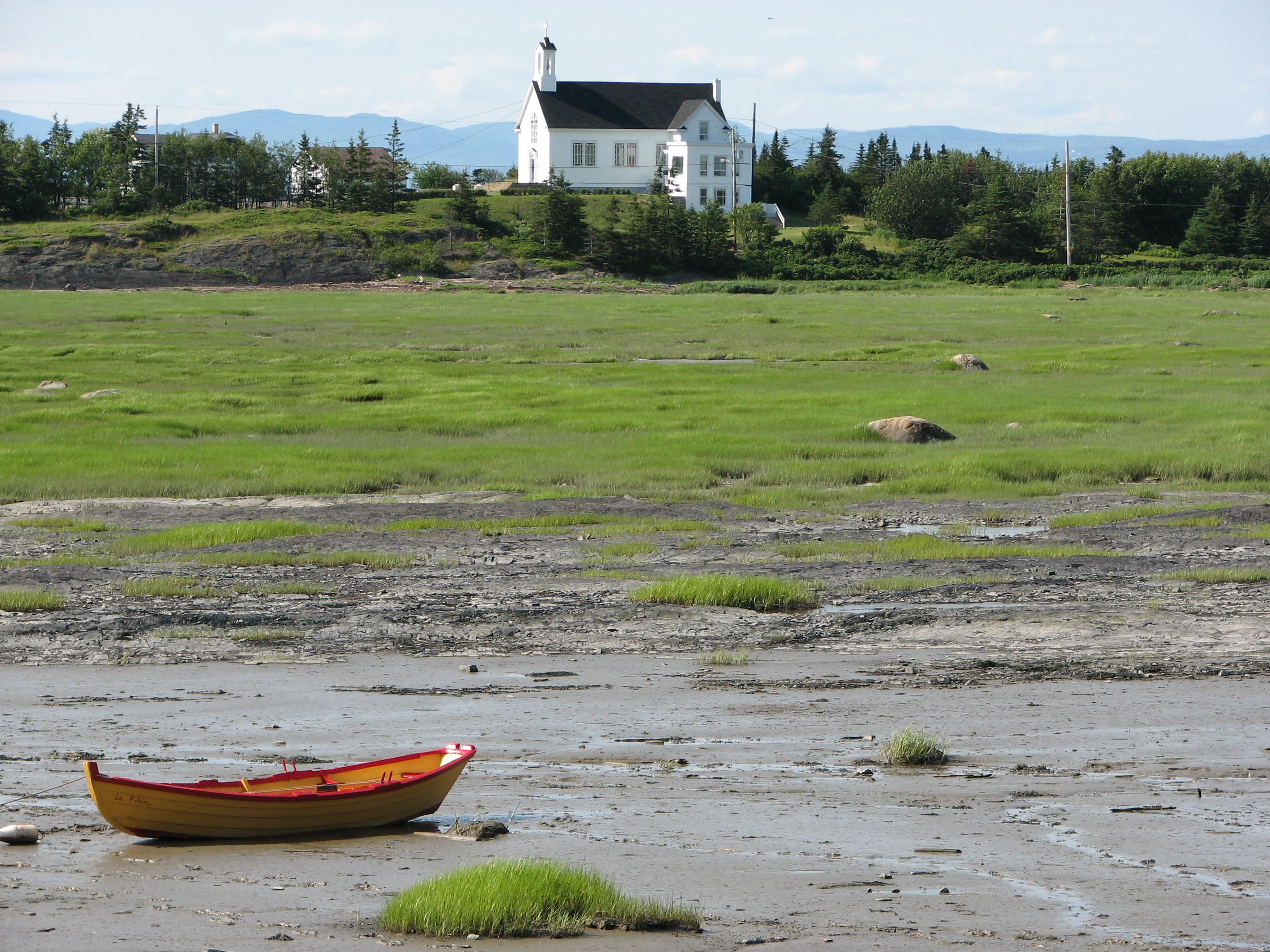
Rivière-Ouelle in July 2006

Rivière-Ouelle lies on the south shore of the Saint Lawrence River.

=== Communities and locations ===
The following designated areas are within the municipality's boundaries:

- De Saint-Just (47°27′07″N 70°00′05″W) – a hamlet located on Route 132
- Pointe-aux-Orignaux (47°29′07″N 70°01′21″W) – a hamlet located on Anse de Mercier (Mercier Bay)
- Pointe-de-Rivière-Ouelle (47°26′02″N 70°03′01″W) – a hamlet located on the shore of the Saint Lawrence River

== Government ==
=== Municipal council ===
- Mayor: Louis-Georges Simard
- Councillors: Lorraine Demers, Marie Dubois, Rémi Faucher, Gilles Martin, Yves Martin, Léo-Paul Thibault

== Notable people ==
- Joseph Boucher (1747–1813), farmer and member of the Legislative Assembly of Lower Canada
- Charles-Eusèbe Casgrain (1800–1848), lawyer and member of the Legislative Assembly of Lower Canada
- André Cimon (1776–1853), merchant and member of the Legislative Assembly of Lower Canada
- Paschal Dumais (1798–1873), notary and member of the Legislative Assembly of Lower Canada
- Charles-Antoine-Ernest Gagnon (1846–1901), notary and member of the Legislative Assembly of Quebec
- Ti-Jean Gagnon (1859–1947), vagrant

== See also ==
- List of municipalities in Quebec
