= Ti-Jean Gagnon =

Québécois vagrant

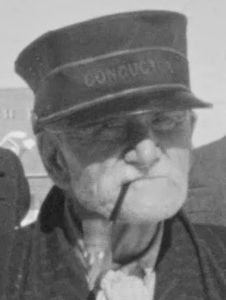
- Born: Charles-François Gagnon; June 1, 1859; Notre-Dame-de-Liesse, Rivière-Ouelle, Quebec, Canada
- Died: July 16, 1947 (aged 88); Quebec City, Quebec, Canada
- Occupations: Vagrant, Musician
- Height: 5 ft 0 in (152 cm)

Ti-Jean Gagnon, born Charles-François Gagnon (1 June 1859 – 16 July 1947), was a Québécois quêteux and musician.

== Biography ==
Charles-François Gagnon was born on 1 June 1859 in Notre-Dame-de-Liesse, Rivière-Ouelle, Quebec to Jean Gagnon, a day labourer, and Marguerite Boucher. He grew up in Saint-Pâcome. His name is likely a deformation of "Le petit de Jean Gagnon" (Jean Gagnon's little one).

Ti-Jean Gagnon wandered between Rimouski and Lévis and busked with a musical saw, "mouth music" and a violin. He was also given food, clothing, and a place to sleep by charity. He spent his winters either in prison or in the homes of those who gave him a place to sleep.

Gagnon would apparently travel on trains for free, and was sometimes invited to the locomotive, where he was given the train conductor's hat and drove the train. He would also sneak into freight wagons. He particularly liked Saint-Anne-de-la Pocatière, and went there almost monthly. He visited the schoolchildren there.

Gagnon attended sports events almost without exception.

He attempted to join the 189th Battalion, but was refused for "idiocy". He was however given an old gun, which he carried everywhere and talked to.

Gagnon was frail and five foot tall. He had a cane made from an iron bar. He was likely mentally deficient. Ti-Jean Gagnon was easy-going, but would sometimes bicker with children and dogs. He was afraid of ropes and would flee when shown one.

He never married and had no children.

Ti-Jean Gagnon spent final years of his life at the sanatorium Mastaï of the Beauport Asylum. He died there on 16 July 1947, suffering from dementia.

== Legacy ==
Ti-Jean Gagnon was praised by Jacques Hébert as "one of the most extraordinary persons he ever met". His grandmother hosted Ti-Jean Gagnon at Saint-Pascal-de-Kamouraska.

Gagnon was filmed by Maurice Proulx.

A wood sculpture of Gagnon was made by Amédée Gaudreau.

A character from Pierre Châtillon's novel "Le fou" was based on Gagnon.
