= Art Mann =

American television personality

- Occupation: television presenter
- Television: Art Mann Presents

Art Mann is an American TV show host most notable for hosting Art Mann Presents..., a travel show that focused on cultural and off-beat party events in North America. Mann's persona was a straight-shooting reporter who interviews colorful, sometimes drunken, characters. Art Mann Presents... has aired on HDNet (now known as AXS TV) since 2005. Its last episode aired on December 24, 2015.

From 1994-2004, Mann hosted a variety of shows for E! Entertainment Television including F.Y.E!, Cut to the Chase, Search Party, and notably Wild On! with Brooke Burke.

Before moving to Southern California, Mann won a 1993 Cable ACE Award, (with A. F. Grant) for his locally produced television show, Cool Stuff, beating out such notables as Rock Talk Live (Denver), A Cable Carol (Chicago), and The Jokester Show (Los Angeles).

Mann currently live streams daily on the popular streaming platform Twitch.tv where he showcases classic episodes of Art Mann Presents while adding behind-the-scenes commentary and interacting with viewers via a live chat.
