= Wild On! =

1997–2003 American TV show

- Presented by: Jules Asner (1997–1999); Brooke Burke (1999–2002); Cindy Taylor (2002–2003)
- Country of origin: United States
- Original language: English

Production
- Running time: 60 minutes

Original release
- Network: E!
- Release: 1997 – 2003

Related
- Taradise

Wild On! is a reality series that was aired from 1997 until 2003 by E!. Each episode followed a celebrity host as they experienced the food, culture, and nightlife of a certain region.

== Overview ==
Sometimes referred to as Wild on E! The series featured exciting travel destinations including Rio de Janeiro, Cancun, Las Vegas, Australia, Miami and Milan.

Wild on! had three primary hosts over the years: Jules Asner (1997–1999), Brooke Burke (1999–2002), and Cindy Taylor (2002–2003). The show also had a variety of guest hosts during its run, including models such as Victoria Silvstedt, Jenna Jameson, Tim Cheveldae, Karen McDougal and Ashley Massaro, Baywatch actress Brooke Burns and actress Eleanor Mondale (the daughter of former U.S. Vice President Walter Mondale). In the last few years, Art Mann provided comic relief as a co-host.

The E! American broadcasts usually censored nudity. However, broadcasts on the Canadian network Star!, mainland Europe, United Kingdom/Ireland, late night showings on E! Latino, and the Australian re-edit Naked Wild On! are uncensored.

== Cancellation ==
The show's ratings peaked during 'The Brooke Burke Years', but took a major dive when Brooke Burke left the show at the end of 2002.

The show originally was supposed to have a new season in 2005 with Tara Reid as the new host. However, a week before the start of the new season, E! changed the focus of the show based on the footage from Tara's travels, and decided to reconfigure it as a reality program based around Tara traveling the world with her friends. The show's title was then changed to Taradise, with the travelogue format of the show dropped and the focus exclusively on Tara. The E! International network, broadcast out of the UK, shows Taradise under the name Wild On Tara!

The program was eventually dropped, even in repeat form as E! began to add original studio late night programming to their schedules, along with the aging of those repeats.

== Naked Wild On! ==
Naked Wild On! is an Australian re-edit of Wild On! in the style of Girls Gone Wild. It brings together various scenes of nudity and lesbianism within the show into a series of themed episodes (see below). All episodes are uncensored and narrated for comical effect. They are all 30 minutes long including commercials.

=== Episode list ===
Some episode titles use alliteration.

- "Decadent Destinations"
- "Sinful Cities"
- "What Were They Thinking?"
- "Girls Girls Girls"
- "Carnal Carnival"
- "Spring Break"
- "Naughty, Nice and Naked"
- "Exotic Erotica"
- "Bump and Grind"
- "Voluptuous Vixens"
- "Bikini Beach Babes"
- "Crazy People"
