= Lingerie party =

Type of party plan for selling women's lingerie products

A lingerie party is a type of personal selling-based party plan for selling women's lingerie products. A social event, like a Tupperware party, is used to display products to guests, and then to take orders for the products. These parties are usually held in lingerie stores, but they have become popular as home parties held at the sales consultant's house. Traditionally, they are held for specific occasions like bridal showers or birthdays and customers include mostly women. However, men and/or couples can also be invited to some events.

Guests at a lingerie party try on and purchase their favorite lingerie. Lingerie companies provide consultants or hostesses who provide a wide variety of lingerie, usually at a discount. Discounts are based upon the price and number of purchased items, the largest discount usually being shared with the host. Independent lingerie hostesses also work in a similar fashion. It is also common for the host of the party to purchase and sell pieces herself. Guests may also have a choice of adult toys, such as vibrators, and other risqué items.

Apart from acquiring lingerie, guests play games, enjoy food, drinks and conversation. Prizes and favors are usually given out by the consultant or host. While the idea of a lingerie home party started in 1977 with UndercoverWear out of Tewksbury, MA, the common lingerie parties in Australia are with companies like UnderCoverWear, Intimo Lingerie, and Shhique.

== See also ==
- Bachelorette party

== Sources ==
- Storr, Merl (2003). Latex and Lingerie: Shopping for Pleasure at Ann Summers Parties. Berg Publishers. ISBN 978-1-85973-698-2.
- Montemurro, Beth (2006). Something Old, Something Bold: Bridal Showers and Bachelorette Parties. Rutgers University Press. ISBN 978-0813539447.
