= Art Mann Presents =

- Genre: Travel
- Starring: Art Mann
- Country of origin: United States
- No. of seasons: 8
- No. of episodes: 188

Production
- Executive producer: Art Mann
- Editor: Kathryn Croy
- Running time: 30 Minutes

Original release
- Network: HDNet and AXS TV
- Release: February 28, 2005 – December 24, 2015

Art Mann Presents was a reality travel show on AXS TV (formerly HDNet) hosted by Art Mann. It featured eclectic public party events and festivals in North America. Mann's persona is a straight-shooting "everyman" reporter who interviews colorful, often inebriated, characters he meets at the events. Art Mann Presents has aired on HDNet/AXS TV since February 2005 and has been out of production since December 2015.

Events visited have included Mardi Gras festivities in New Orleans and various other cities, Bay to Breakers, the Indianapolis 500, and tailgate parties at Jimmy Buffett concerts and other shows and sports events.

The network had also aired an uncensored late-night version of the show featuring ample female nudity, Art Mann Presents: Unrated, until HDNet became AXS TV in July, 2012, and in accordance with the network format changing to a more gender-neutral live entertainment focus, the explicit version was dropped from the schedule.

The song played during the show's opening credits was "Routine of the Dancer" by The Musical Outfits.

Glenn Ebow, an occasional on-screen talent, served as the primary video engineer, cinematographer, and audio technician behind the scenes.

Notable guest stars on the program have included Carmen Electra, Jesse Jane, Jessica Mathews, and Kimberly Fisher.

While no new information regarding the show's status and whether or not it will ever return is known, Art Mann Presents has a new home on Youtube airing partial clips from the series.
