= Divorce party =

Ceremony that celebrates the end of a marriage or civil union

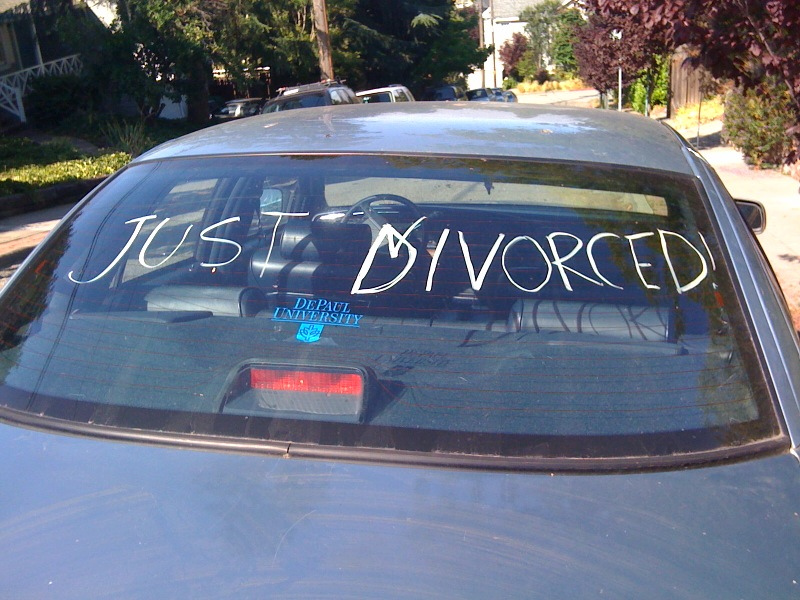
A car window with the message "Just Divorced!", parodying the traditional "Just Married"

A divorce party (also known as a divorce ceremony) is a ceremony that celebrates the end of a marriage or civil union. They can involve either one or both members of the separating couple. Divorce parties have been called the final frontier in the wedding industry complex, and often involve a toast that emphasizes the two individuals beginning new chapters in their lives.

Similar to weddings, divorce parties take on many tenors and serve different purposes. Divorce parties in which couples have become independent of one another are often an announcement of newfound singledom. These divorce parties are often equated to bachelor or bachelorette parties and involve divorce cakes, wedding ring coffins, just-divorced banners, and divorce rings (a notched, or broken, circle). Shanna Moakler hosted her infamous divorce party in Las Vegas, complete with a cake-topper of a dead groom. Las Vegas is widely considered as the divorce party capital of the United States.

Divorce parties that couples co-host often have a serious tone, and are aimed at healing the rifts among family and friends that divorces may cause. They acknowledge the good, even as the marriage is ending, and attempt to let go of the accompanying anguish. When a couple co-hosts a party, they often celebrate what they've shared and ask friends and family to support them as they separate. A recent CNN article on the subject of divorce parties noted that divorce parties are growing in popularity, and helping alleviate the stigma surrounding the end of marriage.

Laura Dave wrote the first novel about divorce parties, which is entitled The Divorce Party. Christine Gallagher developed the divorce party concept on her website DivorcePartyPlanner.com and in her book "The Divorce Party Handbook".

Italian sociologist Laura Arosio argued that the breakdown of the marriage via legal separation and divorce begins for the first time in contemporary Western societies to be regarded as an event of transition in the life course of individuals. Her belief is that the phenomena which are spreading together with marital instability - from the divorce party to service agencies for the newly separated- can be interpreted as an attempt to build a ceremony for this emerging rite of passage (i.e. a divorce rite). Arosio assumes that in the rite of divorce, the three phases - separation, transition, and re-incorporation, as described for the other rites of passage, can be recognized.

== Religious divorce ceremonies in North America ==
=== Unitarian Universalism ===
A divorce ceremony performed by Unitarian Universalist clergy is known as a "ceremony of hope", which is normally carried out in a public forum. According to Beliefnet, the two divorcees are expected to exchange requests and acceptances of forgiveness for supposed infractions which damaged confidence in the relationship.

=== United Methodism ===
A United Methodist church may perform a divorce ceremony.

== East Asia ==
Divorce ceremonies have gained currency in Japan and the People's Republic of China. In Mandarin, they are known as Líhūn yíshì (Chinese: 离婚仪式) or Líhūn diǎnlǐ (Chinese: 离婚典礼), and in Japanese they are known as Rikon-shiki (Japanese: 離婚式).

== Sources ==
- Laura Arosio (2016) Old and new rites of passage in contemporary Western societies: A focus on marriage and divorce ceremonies, Compaso Journal http://compaso.eu/wpd/wp-content/uploads/2016/07/Compaso2016-71-Arosio.pdf
- CNN story about Divorce: Divorce ceremonies for healing ... maybe a toaster http://www.cnn.com/2008/LIVING/personal/03/18/divorce.celebrations/
- Gawker Article About Divorce Being The New Marriage: Divorce Is The New Marriage: https://web.archive.org/web/20080626182157/http://gawker.com/news/trends/divorce-is-the-new-marriage-316734.php
- The Chicago Tribune: article on Las Vegas being the divorce party capital of America--The newly divorced toast their freedom in party capital: http://www.chicagotribune.com/features/lifestyle/chi-0310divorce_vegas_fillmar10,1,5581304.story
- "Getting Divorced? Let's Throw a Party!". CNBC.
- O.K., It's Over. So Now Let's Party - RACHEL DODES = 2/13/2005 - NY Times Sunday Style Section https://www.nytimes.com/2005/02/13/fashion/13DIVO.html
- Barbara and Phil Penningroth. A Healing Divorce: Transforming the End of Your Relationship with Ritual and Ceremony. ISBN 978-1587217937. (AuthorHouse 2001)
