= Engagement party =

Party held to celebrate a couple's recent engagement

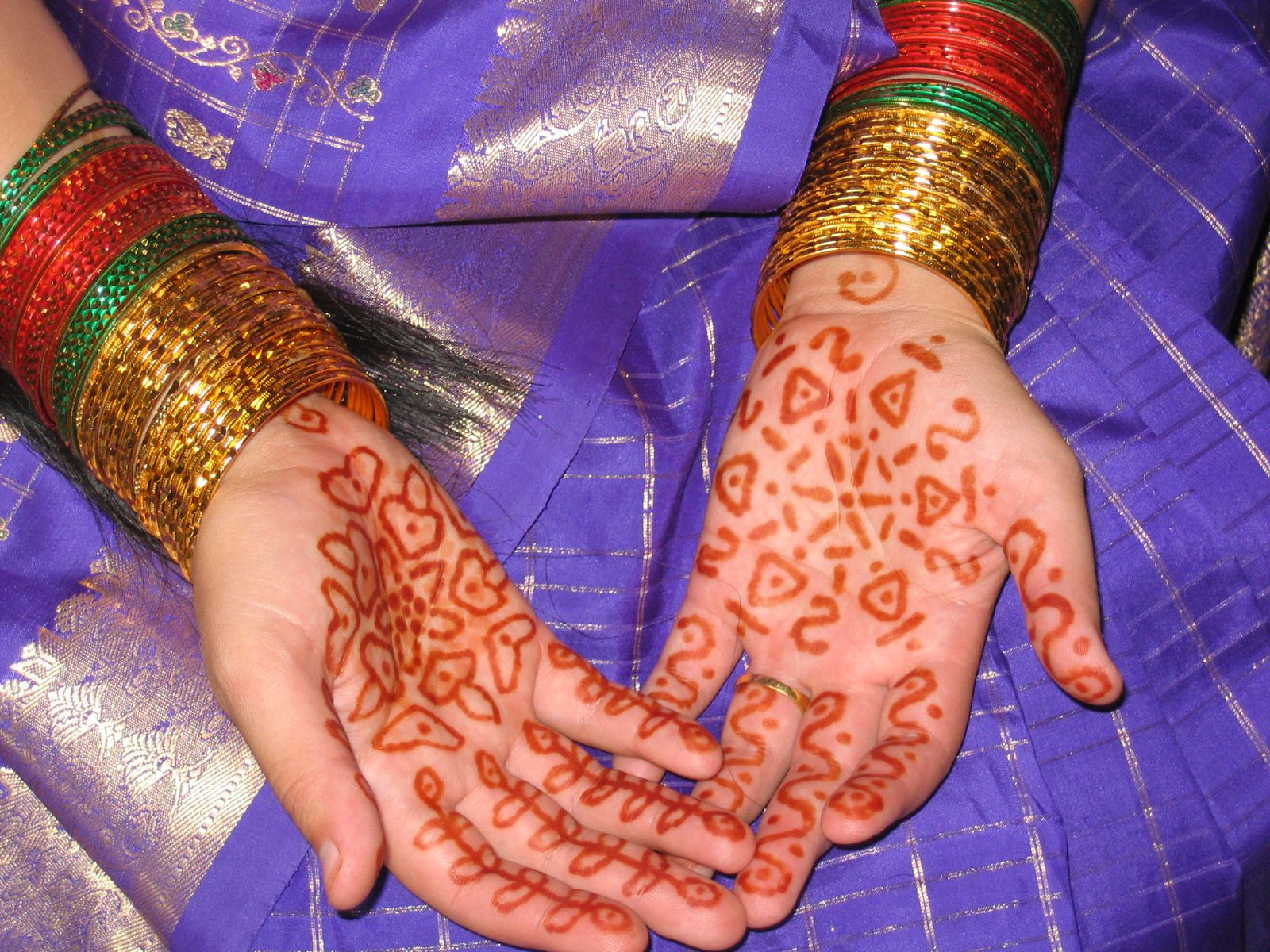
In most of West Asia, North Africa and the Indian subcontinent, engagement parties often feature the use of henna.

An engagement party, also known as a betrothal party or fort, is a party held to celebrate a couple's recent engagement and to help future wedding guests to get to know one another. Traditionally, the bride's parents host the engagement party, but many modern couples host their own celebration.

== History ==
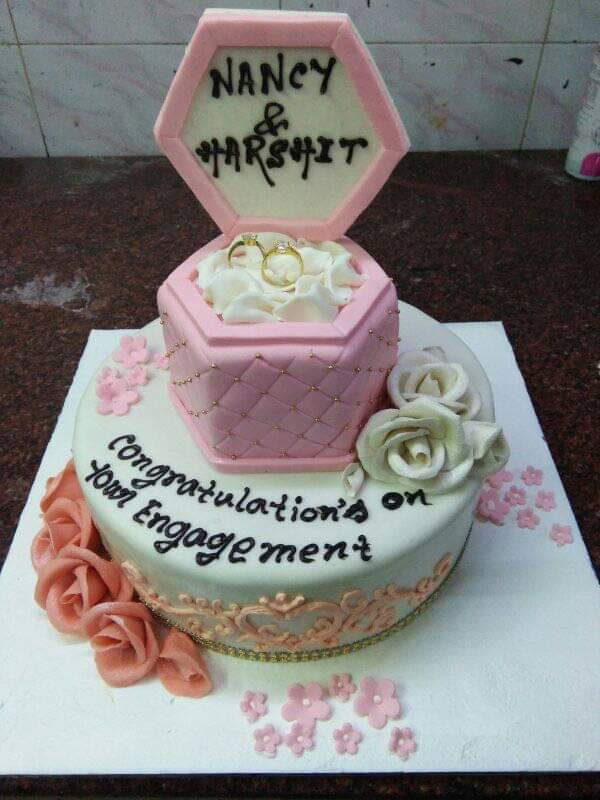
An engagement cake at a betrothal party

Originally, engagement parties had the appearance of normal parties at which the father of the bride-to-be made a surprise announcement of the engagement to his guests, which was ecclesiastically solemnized in a rite of betrothal at a church, according to Christian customs. The engagement party had the purpose of sharing the engagement news with family members and friends. Therefore, it was not a traditional gift-giving occasion, as none of the guests were supposed to be aware of the engagement until after their arrival.

In ancient Greece, an engagement party was a commercial transaction. It was an oral contract, between the man who gave the woman in marriage, generally the father and the groom. The bride was not present.

An Ashkenazi Jewish engagement party is known as a vort (Yiddish: word). Breaking a ceramic plate at a vort is customary, symbolizing the permanence of marriage and mirroring the breaking of a glass at a Jewish wedding.

In the Scottish Gaelic tradition, a rèiteach was a betrothal ritual which typically ended in a dance party for the whole community.

=== Modern times ===
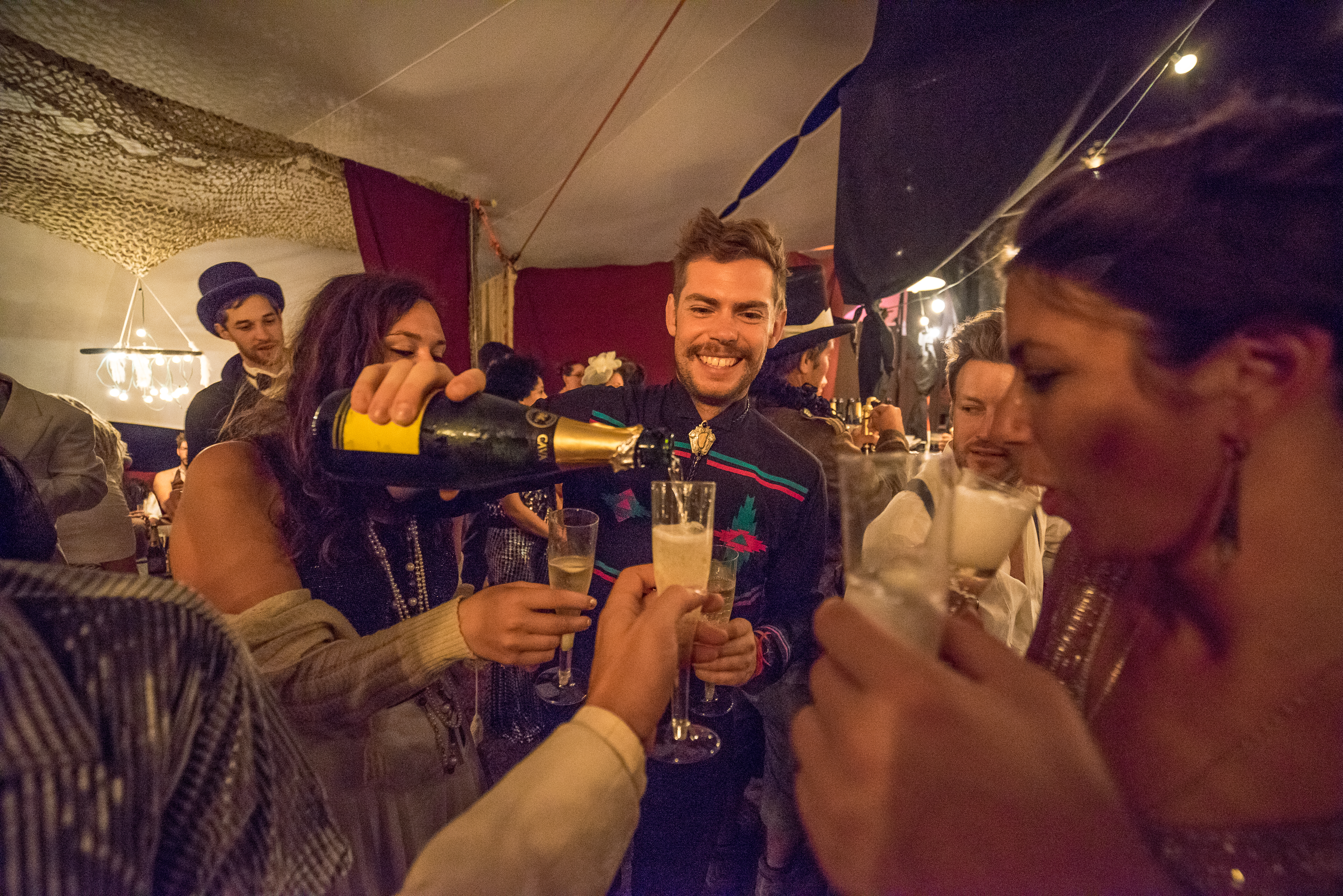
An engagement party at a bar in the United States

In modern times, an engagement party may celebrate a previously publicized engagement. It is a party like any other, except that usually toasts or speeches are made to announce the upcoming wedding. While it varies, an engagement party takes place at the beginning of the process of planning a wedding. It is often thrown at the couple's home or at the home of a close friend or relative of the couple, or at the couple's church hall. Gifts are never obligatory, and if one is brought, it should be small and less expensive than a typical wedding gift.

A Christian betrothal ceremony, which is often followed with an engagement party, is normative in certain parts of the world, as with the Christians of India and Pakistan.

In Africa, what is now known as an engagement party may in fact be the last remnant of the traditional, pre-colonial marriage ceremony itself. Such is the case with the Yoruba people and their bride-price rites and the Nguni people and their lobola practices.

== See also ==
- Bachelor party
- Bachelorette party
- Bridal shower
- Stag and doe
