= Stag and doe =

Canadian party and fundraiser for an engaged couple

A stag and doe party, stag and drag party, buck and doe party, a jack and jill party, or a wedding social is a Canadian party and fundraiser for an engaged couple.

== Canada ==
A stag and doe is a cultural event in Canada, popular mostly in Manitoba, Northern Ontario and rural Southern Ontario under various names to raise money for a couple for their future wedding plans or honeymoon. In Southern Ontario it may be called a stag and doe, or buck and doe. In Manitoba, this is often called a social or wedding social with less fundraising pressure than seen in Southern Ontario. In some other areas this is known as a Jack and Jill. In Northern Ontario, this is known as a "Shag".

The event is usually organized by the bridal party, but in some circumstances may also be held by the bride and groom before they are married. It acts as a fundraiser for the wedding. Guests purchase entrance tickets and are entertained by raffles, food and drink, music and fun and games that they will pay for to participate in. Entry tickets, raffle tickets, and games are present in almost all stag and does. The party is not a combined stag night/bachelor party and bachelorette party, or engagement party, as the primary focus is to raise money for the engaged couple, so their new life together is not started in debt.

The intent of a stag and doe party is specifically to make a profit.

Often, people who may not be close enough to the engaged couple to warrant an invitation to the wedding or reception (especially in the case of a small wedding), will be "tapped" to attend the stag and doe so as to be part of the overall wedding fundraising. Hosting a stag and doe party does not preclude the couple from participating in other wedding-related parties, such as a bridal shower, bachelor party, bachelorette party, and so on.

A popular stag and doe tradition is a toonie toss, which has guests toss toonies (CA$2 coins) at a Texas mickey (3L) bottle of liquor. The toss runs for some time until the Toonie closest to the bottle without making contact wins the bottle.

In Manitoba, in addition to purchasing entrance tickets, guests bid on silent auction prizes, participate in a 50–50 draw, and purchase liquor. Typical food at a Manitoba wedding social includes KUB bread, cold cuts, cheese cubes, and Timbits. Often the bridal or wedding shower is held the afternoon before the social. Other times, it is used as a fundraiser for the wedding itself and will be held a few weeks before the day of the wedding.

== Other countries ==
An uncommon event borrowed from the tradition of Canada, and only held in small pockets of certain US States. Guests typically have to purchase a ticket to cover the costs of the event. Guests could be offered memorabilia such as an engraved cup with the couple's names and wedding date.
