= Bouzoukia =

Bouzoukia may refer to:

- Bouzouki (pl. bouzoukia), a Greek lute
- Bouzoukia (nightclub), Greek nightclubs that feature laïkó music
