= The Beatification of the Area Boy =

Play by Wole Soyinka

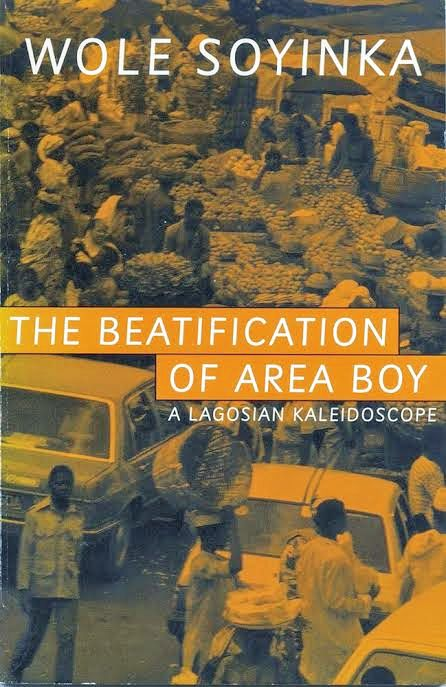
- Author: wole soyinka
- Language: English
- Genre: fiction
- Publisher: A&C Black Pod
- Publication date: January 1, 1995
- Publication place: Nigeria, England
- ISBN: 0-413-68680-9

The Beatification of the Area Boy, a play by Wole Soyinka, was first published in Great Britain in 1995 and later in Nigeria in 1999. The play explores the absurdities present in Nigerian society, particularly under military rule, and by extension, in any African nation where regressive systems remain unchallenged due to a lack of checks and balances.

== Plot ==
The play is set in a shopping plaza in Lagos and revolves around Sanda, who commands a group of area boys. A prestigious wedding between two prominent families is about to take place in the plaza, but tensions arise when the bride, Miseyi, challenges traditional customs by presenting herself to Sanda instead of her intended groom. This sparks conflict between the families and the military governor, leading to chaos.

Sanda manipulates the situation to his advantage, orchestrating schemes involving his associates to divert attention and exploit opportunities for financial gain. Through a network of characters, including Judge, Barber, Trader, Mama Put, Boyko, Cyclist, Minstrel, and Miseyi, the play explores themes of power, corruption, and societal hierarchy in Lagosian society.

Sanda emerges as the central figure, cunningly orchestrating events to benefit himself while navigating the complexities of Lagosian life. The play critiques military dictatorship, societal inequalities, and moral decay, highlighting the consequences of corruption and exploitation on both individuals and society as a whole.

== Characters ==
=== Major cast ===
- Sanda: The central character of the play, Sanda is a cunning and calculating security officer at an opulent shopping plaza in Lagos. He orchestrates various criminal activities with ease and is the focal point around which the plot revolves. However, beneath his facade of control lies a vulnerability stemming from his past, particularly his friendship with Miseyi, which complicates his motivations and actions throughout the play.
- Miseyi: Sanda's friend from university and a significant character in the play, Miseyi plays a pivotal role in the wedding ceremony at the plaza. She chooses Sanda as her bridegroom, leading to significant events in the plot.
- Judge: Despite facing numerous obstacles, Judge remains steadfast in his mission to bring about positive change, making him a moral compass amidst the chaos.
- Barber: Defined by his belief in ritual killing as a means of making money, Barber represents the darker aspects of society. He is willing to engage in nefarious activities for personal gain.
- Trader: Like Barber, Trader believes in ritual killing and views it as a lucrative venture. He holds the belief that certain body parts can bring wealth to individuals.
- Mama Put: Preoccupied with selling and training her daughter, Mama Put harbors a deep-seated hatred for soldiers due to the death of her brother.
- Boyko: Distinguished by his willingness to pander to Sanda's criminal interests, Boyko serves as a convenient instrument for Sanda to achieve his goals. He plays a crucial role in executing Sanda's schemes.
- Cyclist: Obsessed with attending a job interview, Cyclist navigates the plaza on his bicycle, surprising those around him.
- Minstrel: Poised to visit any place where a party is held, Minstrel revels in showcasing his repertoire of songs as a troubadour.

=== Minor cast ===
- Two-Four: A minor character but significant to the plot, Two-Four is responsible for stealing Big Man Shopper's briefcase, which sets off a chain of events in the plaza.
- Big Man Shopper: A wealthy individual who falls victim to a theft in the plaza, Big Man Shopper's altercation with Boyko and Sanda reveals the power dynamics within the societal hierarchy.
- Victim: A character whose genitals are allegedly removed by Accused, Victim becomes embroiled in a bizarre incident that underscores the superstitions and beliefs prevalent in society.
- Attendant: Responsible for enforcing parking regulations in the plaza. His interaction with Sanda reveals the pervasive influence of corruption and manipulation in everyday transactions.
- Soldiers: Although not individual characters per se, the presence of soldiers and their actions represent the looming threat of military dictatorship and the use of force to suppress dissent. Their interactions with Judge and other characters underscore the pervasive atmosphere of fear and intimidation.

== Setting ==
The primary setting of the play is the shopping plaza, a symbol of wealth and extravagance amidst the urban landscape of Lagos. It serves as a microcosm of Nigerian society, attracting a wide variation of characters from various social backgrounds, each with their own aspirations and motivations.

The reference to Good Time Bar in Ikorodu, a suburb of Lagos, depicts the nature of the city and the interconnectedness of its various neighborhoods. Ikorodu, with its culture and identity, adds to the play's portrayal of Lagos and its traditions.
