= Valeria Lukyanova =

Ukrainian model (born 1985)

- Валерія Лук'янова (Ukrainian); Валерия Лукьянова (Russian)
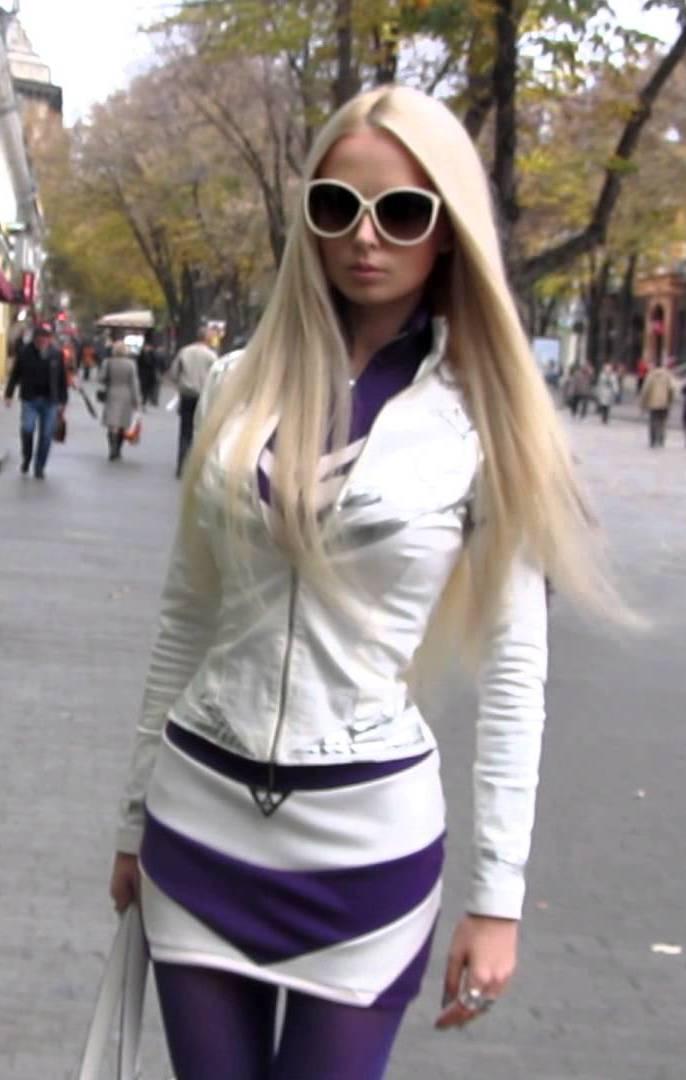
- Lukyanova in 2012
- Born: Valeria Valeryevna Lukyanova; 23 August 1985 (age 41); Tiraspol, Moldavian SSR, Soviet Union
- Citizenship: Ukraine
- Occupations: Model; entertainer
- Years active: 2001–present
- Spouse: Dmitry Shkrabov (m. 2013)
- Modeling information
- Hair color: Blonde

Valeria Valeryevna Lukyanova (Ukrainian: Валерія Валеріївна Лук'янова; Russian: Валерия Валерьевна Лукьянова; born 23 August 1985) is a Ukrainian model best known for her resemblance to a Barbie doll. She currently has property in Mexico and lives in Moscow. To enhance the Barbie effect Lukyanova uses makeup and contact lenses over her naturally green/gray/blue eyes. She has stated that she has had breast implants, but that the rest of her body is natural and slender due to daily gym workouts and a particular diet.

== Early life ==
Lukyanova was born 1985, in Tiraspol, in what was then part of Moldavian SSR in the Soviet Union. She is of Russian origin. Her mother, Irina, worked within the military sector; her father was a construction worker who also was a part-time disc jockey. Lukyanova lived in Odesa, Ukraine from age 16 until 2014, when she moved to Moscow.

== Modeling career ==
In 2007, Lukyanova won the worldwide beauty contest "Miss Diamond Crown of the World". The beauty pageant was open to any woman, had about 300 contestants, and had no rule forbidding plastic surgery or body modification. She subsequently had multiple photo sessions and interviews published in Russian media, including erotic photos. Lukyanova developed a worldwide following for her Barbie doll-like appearance after she posted photos and videos of herself on the web. The first notable coverage of her from outside Russia was on the Jezebel blog, followed by a photo session in V by Sebastian Faena. The media described her as being like a living Barbie doll.

There has been scepticism of Lukyanova. ABC News suggested that Lukyanova was a hoax aided by image editing software. Diane Levin regarded Lukyanova as an example of the negative effects of media objectification. To counter the image editing accusations, Lukyanova posted videos on YouTube and appeared on Russia-1 and Channel One Russia TV channels. Lukyanova admitted to having breast augmentation but no other plastic surgery, and denies that she had ribs removed to make her waist smaller. Lukyanova blamed people unconnected to her for altering photos of her younger self in a malicious attempt to imply she had received body modifications.

In 2013, Lukyanova was the subject of an episode of Vice's My Life Online documentary series entitled Space Barbie. In 2013 she participated in the documentary movie The Phase, which was released on YouTube in 7 languages.

In 2015, Lukyanova participated in Dosso Dossi's fashion show as a model.

== Music, acting, and spirituality ==
Lukyanova is an instructor at the School of Out-of-Body Travel, described as "an international school in which our instructors show students how to leave their physical body and travel in their spiritual body." Her spiritual name is Amatue.

She is a composer, an opera singer, and has recorded two albums of new-age music, Sun in the Eyes and 2013 using the name Amatue. She wrote and self-published a book about her astral trips, Astral Travel Amatue, which she made available in 2012 as an RTF file to download for free from her website.

She had her debut starring role in a feature film in The Doll (2017), a horror movie directed and written by Susannah O'Brien. The film, which also includes Mindy Robinson and Ron Jeremy, revolves around Lukyanova's character, an escort made from doll parts created by a doctor to recruit others to kill, and the two men who requested her. The movie presented at the Cannes Film Festival in 2017.

== Personal life ==
She is of Russian origin. She has a bachelor's degree in architecture from Odesa State Academy of Constructions and Architecture.

She is married to Ukrainian businessman Dmitry Shkrabov, her childhood friend. However, Lukyanova said that she does not want to have children or a "family lifestyle."

Lukyanova is a strict raw vegetarian, living on a liquid diet. She said that her weight was 45 kg (100 lb) in 2012. In 2014, she stated she was training herself to live off only light and air and converting to breatharianism, a cult with the central belief that food and possibly water are not necessary for survival. However, she later stopped this experiment, stating: "I still would like to do breatharianism someday. But right now, I am far from it, and I do not know when I will do it".

In 2014, because of the war in Donbas, Lukyanova moved from Odesa to Moscow.

=== Attacks ===
In 2014, Lukyanova reported to police that she was punched and strangled by two men outside her home, after receiving anonymous threats for over the past two years. She was hospitalized and released a week later.

== Political views ==
Lukyanova caused controversy when she expressed support of Russia during the war in Donbas. She wrote, after posing in the Crimea region: "Do not give up! fight! Our grandfathers fought with bare hands against the fascists! Do not disgrace the honour of the Great Warrior! Be aware that Russia is always with you!"

According to a 2014 article on GQ, she claimed that race-mixing caused "degeneration" and said that race-mixing was the reason why there are presumably fewer beautiful women today. About her own looks, she said, "I have white skin; I am a Nordic type - perhaps a little Eastern Baltic, but closer to Nordic." She also claimed that a girl born to a Russian mother and an Armenian father would need to go through plastic surgery to reduce the size of her nose.

== Nicknames ==
Throughout her career, she has received various nicknames referring to her Barbie-like appearance. She has most commonly been referred to as "The Human Barbie".

In Russian-speaking media, she's often been referred to as "The Russian Barbie," "The Ukrainian Barbie," and "The Odesa Barbie."

Lukyanova, has expressed anger at the nickname of "Human Barbie", as she feels that it's "a little degrading and insulting" but that she's used to it now as it's the image her fans "requested" so she has to "comply with it because it's become part of my aesthetic image, but I don't like it".

== Discography ==
=== Albums ===
- 2009: Sun in the Eyes
- 2013: 2013

=== Single appearances ===
- "One Expectation" (2013) – by Alessandra Ambrosio ft. Amatue

=== Music videos ===
- 2010: "Venus"
- 2011: "Endless eternity"

== Bibliography ==
- Astral Travel Amatue (2012)

== Filmography ==
- The Phase (2013) – documentary movie
- The Doll (2017)

== See also ==
- Sarah Burge
- Venus Angelic
