= Polterabend =

German custom involving breaking porcelain on the evening before a wedding

Polterabend (Polish: pultrować) is a German and to a lesser extent Polish, Austrian and Swiss wedding custom in which, on the night before the wedding, the guests break porcelain to bring luck to the couple's marriage. The belief in the effectiveness of this custom is expressed by the old adage: "Shards bring luck" (German: Scherben bringen Glück). The expression is derived from a time when the word "shard" referred to the unbroken clay pots of pottery makers, and not just the broken pieces. It was said that a full jar was a lucky thing to have, therefore the expression "shards bring luck".

== Etymology ==
The word "Polterabend" comes from German verb poltern (making a lot of noise) + noun Abend (evening). It is not the same as a bachelor party (Junggesellenabschiedsfeier), which has become common in Germany. At a Polterabend, the couple celebrates together with their friends, breaking porcelain for good luck in their new companionship, according to the superstition, whereas at a bachelor party the bride and the groom go out separately with their friends to celebrate the last day of their so-called freedom.

== Event ==
The Polterabend normally takes place in front of the house of the bride (or that of her parents), although exceptions are made for space considerations, for example. The couple generally announces the occasion but does not specifically send out individual invitations. Word spreads via word of mouth, and those with a desire to show up may do so. Many couples use this as a way of including people whom they are not able to invite to the wedding itself. Something to eat and/or drink is arranged (either provided for or requested of the guests). Often guests will bring their gifts to the Polterabend.

The actual high point of the custom is the throwing onto the ground of porcelain that has been brought by guests. However, stoneware, flowerpots or ceramics such as tiles, sinks and toilet bowls are also happily thrown items. Metal objects such as tin cans and bottle tops are brought along to the festivities. Glass is not broken because for some glass symbolises happiness. Mirrors should not be broken due to the old superstition that breaking a mirror will bring seven years of bad luck, in addition to the good things – or the lack thereof – in the breaker's and/or breakee's past. The couple must thereafter take care of cleaning up the pile of shards. This is supposed to make the couple aware that they will have to suffer together through difficult conditions and situations in life.

Relatively new is the so-called Polter-wedding. In this case, the wedding is combined with the Polterabend, and the smashing occurs in conjunction with the wedding reception.

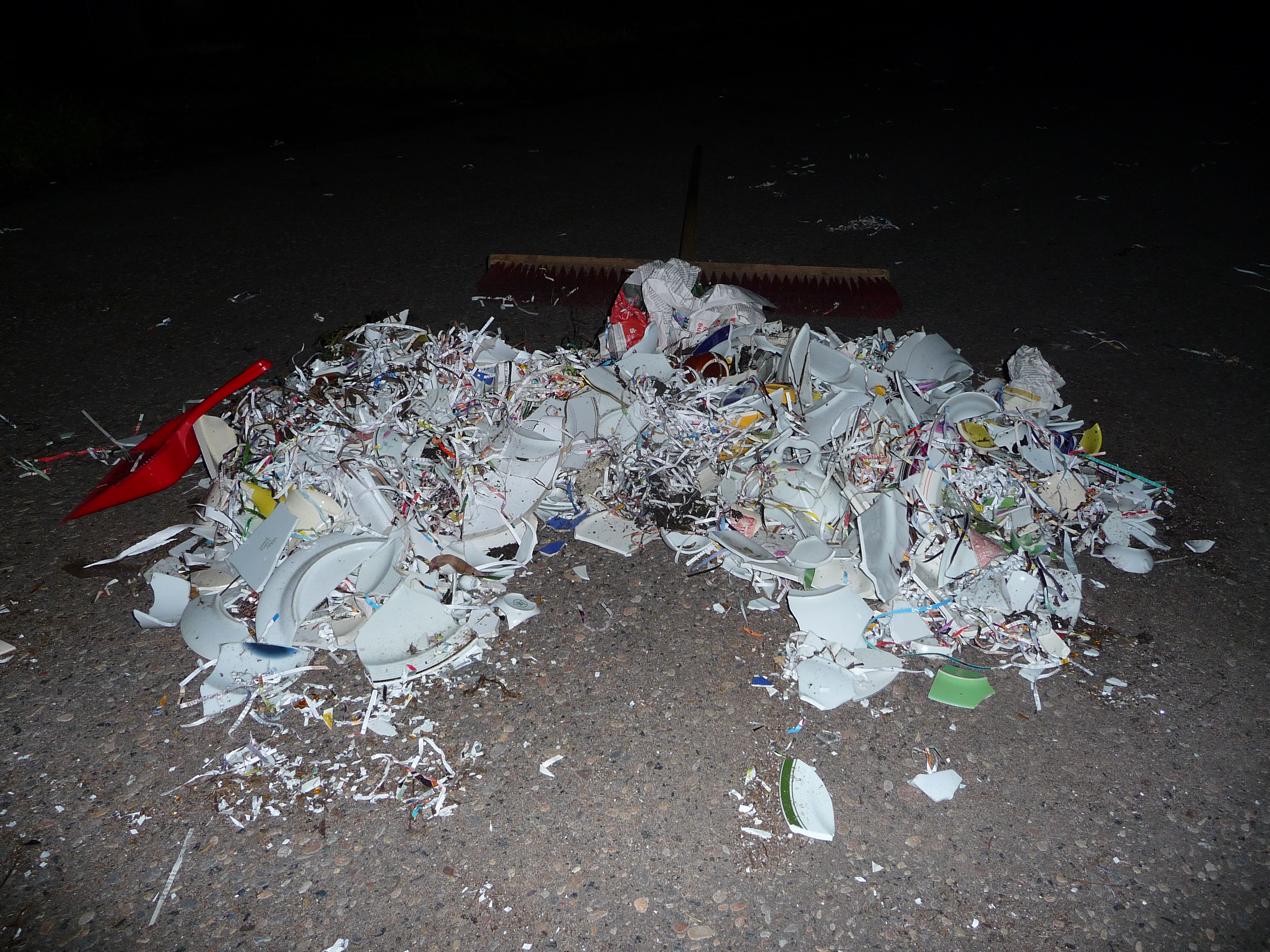
Aftermath of a Polterabend

== Origin ==
The origin of the Polterabend is not precisely known. Some believe the origin to be Germanic tribes who threw shards to drive off evil spirits. Others believe the heathen ritual of the shattering of clay sacrificial altars after a sacrifice to the gods to be responsible. It is possible that the Polterabend has a psychological motive: suitors who may have wished to have the bride for themselves have the opportunity to "let the steam out" in a socially appropriate manner.

== Regions ==
The Polterabend is most often celebrated on the Friday evening before the church ceremony, even in some regions on the Thursday or Saturday evening before. If the Polterabend occurs on the eve of the wedding, the couple is permitted to leave the celebration early (i.e. around midnight), so as to be fresh and without a hangover the next morning - the Polterabend is traditionally celebrated with more gusto and frolicking than the actual wedding festivities.

This is only the case in some parts of Germany. In Austria and Switzerland, bride and groom get separate bachelor/ette parties rather than a Polterabend.

Some regions additionally celebrate the so-called custom of "Paube": the Paube can also be celebrated days or weeks before the wedding. On one hand, it is meant as a sort of engagement party; on the other hand, it is often coupled with the housewarming of a new shared dwelling for the couple and expresses the joy of their future life together. The Paube is less raucous than the Polterabend. Normally, the father of the bride barbecues at the Paube. In some areas of Hesse the traditional green sauce from seven herbs is prepared; here the color green and the number seven stand for lucky charms for the couple.

The Polterabend is commonly celebrated in Germany and in the western parts of Poland, especially in Wielkopolska, Silesia, Kashubia, Kujawy and Kociewie, where there used to be significant German cultural influences. Polterabend has also been part of the wedding preparation for centuries in Sweden, Finland and in some rural areas in Brazil among the descendants of immigrants. In Danish, the word "polterabend" has come to denote a bachelor or bachelorette party.

== In popular culture ==
The custom is depicted in the German short film Porcelain directed by Annika Birgel. The 2024 film was premiered at the 74th Berlin International Film Festival on 21 February.

== Literature ==
- Martin P. Richter: Gelungene Überraschungen für Polterabend und Junggesellenabschied, Freiburg, Urania, 2005. ISBN 3-332-01612-1

== See also ==
- Plate smashing at Greek weddings
- Breaking the glass at Jewish weddings
