= Porcelain (disambiguation) =

Porcelain is a ceramic material.

Porcelain may also refer to:

== Materials ==
- Porcelain enamel
- Industrial porcelain enamel
- Dental porcelain, porcelain used to create lifelike crowns, bridges, and veneers

== Music ==
=== Albums ===
- Porcelain (Emil Bulls album)
- Porcelain (Julia Fordham album)
- Porcelain (Matt Cardle album)
- Porcelain (Peach PRC album)
- Porcelain (Sparta album)
- Porcelain (EP), by Fuel
- Porcelain, a 2007 album by Helen Jane Long

=== Songs ===
- "Porcelain" (song), by Moby, 1999
- "Porcelain", by Adam Lambert and Lexie Liu from Adam, 2026
- "Porcelain", by Better Than Ezra
- "Porcelain", by Ichiko Aoba from Windswept Adan, 2020
- "Porcelain", by Motionless in White from Scoring the End of the World, 2022
- "Porcelain", by Patrick Stump from Truant Wave, 2011
- "Porcelain", by the Pretenders from Extended Play, 1981
- "Porcelain", by Red Hot Chili Peppers from Californication, 1999

== Entertainment ==
- Porcelain (film), a 2024 German short film for children
- Porcelain: Poem on the Downfall of My City, a 2005 poetry collection by Durs Grünbein
- Porcelain, a play by Chay Yew
- Porcelain, a webcomic from Red Giant Entertainment

== See also ==
- Porcelaine, a French dog breed with a shiny white coat
