= Plate smashing =

Greek custom

Plate smashing is a Greek custom that peaked in the 1960s and 1970s, involving the intentional smashing of plates or glasses during celebratory occasions. In popular culture, the practice is most typical of foreigners' stereotypical image of Greece, and while it occurs more rarely today, it continues to be seen on certain occasions, such as weddings, although plaster plates are more likely to be used.

== History in Greece ==
=== Modern times ===
The practice was started by an entrepreneur, Babavea, who opened the Folies d'été cabaret at the end of Herodes Atticus. During the junta period, plate breaking was fought and banned as a separate offense by law punishable by up to 5 years in prison. Despite the junta ban, the plate-breaking continued and many celebrities were referred to the prosecutor, such as the ex-husband of Zoe Laskari, Petros Koutoumanos, Aristotle Onassis and Omar Sharif. The junta finally issued a special opinion, which ruled that there was no offense if the breaking of dishes was accompanied by the acceptance of the behavior of the person doing this act by those present.

Today there are still patrons who let off steam by smashing plates in nightclubs and other objects. The only gypsum plate manufacturing industry operating today in Greece is that of Gentzos Constantinos, based in Diavata, Thessaloniki. The practice of breaking seems to have been replaced by throwing flowers towards the stage where the artist is singing, which was first started by Marinella.

== Greek films depicting the practice of smashing dishes ==
- Never on Sunday (1960)
- The Blue Beads (1967)
- Some tired boys (1967)
- Medusa (1973)
- It's a Long Road (1998)
- I Really Play the Man (1983)
- Rembetiko (1983)

== See also ==
- Zeibekiko, a Greek folk dance by the groom
- Breaking the glass at Jewish weddings
- Polterabend
- Funeral practices and burial customs in the Philippines
- Marriage and wedding customs in Greece
- Marriage and wedding customs in the Philippines
- Nightclubs in Greece
