= Sarah Burge =

British cosmetic surgery proponent

Sarah Burge (born 1960) is a British cosmetic surgery proponent known for the hundreds of cosmetic surgeries she has undergone as well as gifting of vouchers for cosmetic surgeries to her young daughter. Burge has been called the "bionic woman" and has undergone $3,000,000 worth of cosmetics surgeries over 20 years.

== Early life ==
Born Sarah Goddard, she first had cosmetic surgery at the age of seven to correct overly prominent ears. In her 20s, she had liposuction to sharpen her jawline. However, she traces her addiction to surgery to an attack by her then-boyfriend that left her disfigured for six years. Experiencing disfigurement and the effects of corrective surgery made her an advocate for cosmetic surgery. She trained as a nurse and then opened a cosmetic surgery consultation service on Harley Street.

Burge has undergone hundreds of procedures since. She says, "When I lost my face I didn't feel good on the inside. I was miserable. As for being an addict I'm the first one to admit it's true. I'm addicted to looking good. What's wrong with that?".

== Fraud conviction ==
In the mid-2000s, Burge made headlines in the UK when she was convicted of fraud after making false statements to the UK Government to receive government support. At the time she was running a beauty treatment clinic in St. Neots, Cambridgeshire. Under her maiden name of Sarah Goddard she admitted illegally claiming almost £2,000 housing and Council Tax benefits. Burge admitted that she used the money to pay for buttock enhancement surgery because she wanted "a bottom like Kylie Minogue". Anthony Burge, now her husband, admitted in court aiding her in the fraud.

== Cosmetics vouchers for daughter ==
In 2010, Burge made more headlines when she taught her then six-year-old daughter, Poppy, to pole dance. In 2011, she gave Poppy a £6,000 voucher for breast enhancement for the child's 7th birthday. The gift topped off a £12,000 'exotic pamper party' to celebrate the child's birthday. That Christmas, Poppy received a £7,000 voucher for liposuction. In 2012, Poppy received an additional £8,000 in vouchers for additional cosmetic surgery procedures along with a lavish party costing £25,000. Burge points out that each of the vouchers may not be redeemed until Poppy turns 18.

== Criticisms ==
Critics of Burge label her numerous surgeries a need for publicity or even an addiction and worry that this behaviour could be passed on to her young daughter and cause permanent damage. Burge appeared on Anderson on 22 May 2012, hosted by Anderson Cooper. Burge walked out after Cooper told her, "I try to be really polite to all my guests. I think you're dreadful and I honestly don't want to talk to you anymore." Cooper stated later that he felt she was only seeking publicity. Burge responded by accusing him of the same thing: "I went on the Anderson Cooper show after being offered a chance to talk about plastic surgery, my controversial views, my book and domestic violence; instead he attacked me in what I can only assume was a bid for international glory. I can take a beating but he did it in front of my 8-year-old daughter Poppy and he should be ashamed. He has a duty of care to minors."
