= Porcelain (film) =

2024 German short film

- Festival release poster
- German: Porzellan
- Directed by: Annika Birgel
- Written by: Annika Birgel; Rudolf Fitzgerald Leonard
- Produced by: Rudolf Fitzgerald Leonard
- Starring: Nell Marie Haack; Liv Heleen Haack; Niklas Leifert
- Cinematography: Lydia Richter
- Edited by: Rudolf Fitzgerald Leonard
- Music by: Sam Bower; Marie-Claire Schlameus
- Production company: Problemkind Film
- Distributed by: interfilm
- Release date: 21 February 2024 (Berlinale)
- Running time: 16 minutes
- Country: Germany
- Language: German

Porcelain (German: Porzellan) is a 2024 German short drama film co-written and directed by Annika Birgel. As per Berlinale's profile the film "is a tender, timeless reflection on the coming-of-age of girls in a patriarchal society. Through Fina’s eyes, the film looks at female role models and the experiences and emotions which shape growing up across generations."

It was selected in the Generation Kplus section at the 74th Berlin International Film Festival, where it had its World premiere on 21 February and competed for Crystal Bear for the Best Film.

== Synopsis ==
A village on an isolated island in Germany has a custom of smashing porcelain plates before a wedding. Fina, a ten-year-old girl, is eager to join the fun, but things don't go as planned. She feels out of place among the women and wishes she had a female mentor. She and her caring older sister slowly understand the impact of their mother's absence in their lives. They realise that they have to support each other to cope with the challenges of growing up.

== Cast ==
- Nell Marie Haack as Fina
- Liv Heleen Haack as Elisabeth
- Niklas Leifert as George, Fina's Dad
- Jana Rath as bride
- Niklas Kappler as groom

== Production ==
The film produced by Problemkind Film was funded by MOIN Film Fund Schleswig-Holstein, Board of Trustees for Young German Film, The Federal Government Commissioner for Culture and the Media (BKM), German Films and German Federal Film Board.

Filming took place from 15 October to 22 October 2022, in Hamburg, Berlin and Schleswig-Holstein, under director of photography Lydia Richter.

== Release ==
Porcelain had its World premiere on 21 February 2024, as part of the 74th Berlin International Film Festival, in Generation Kplus.

== Accolades ==
Award	Date	Category	Recipient	Result	Ref.
Berlin International Film Festival	25 February 2024	Generation Kplus Crystal Bear for Best Feature Film	Annika Birgel	Nominated	
