= Pamper party =

Female-oriented party

A pamper party, or pampering party, is a female-oriented party in which the guests receives beauty and massage treatments and generally spend time to indulge and pamper themselves.

Pamper parties are usually held in the hostess's home, but they are sometimes offered by spas and salons. In the UK, a pamper party is a popular component of a hen party or hen weekend, which would be termed a bachelorette party in the US.

Pamper parties are usually considered to be a healthy indulgence; in addition to pampering treatments, the hostess usually provides healthy snacks, fruit juices and smoothies.

== Children's pamper parties ==
Pamper parties may also be organized as a variation to a girl's birthday party for slightly older children in which the theme of the event seeks to mimic an adult pamper party in a safe environment, such as a parent's home. They combine elements of children's parties, such as party-bags, with elements of adult pamper parties, such as cosmetics and well-being, in a child-friendly manner with "pamper baskets" typically being given to younger guests. It is common for the events to be combined with a sleepover, slumber party or pajama party. Similarly, it is a form is "rite of passage" from childhood to adulthood.
