= Bridal shower =

Party where a bride-to-be is given gifts

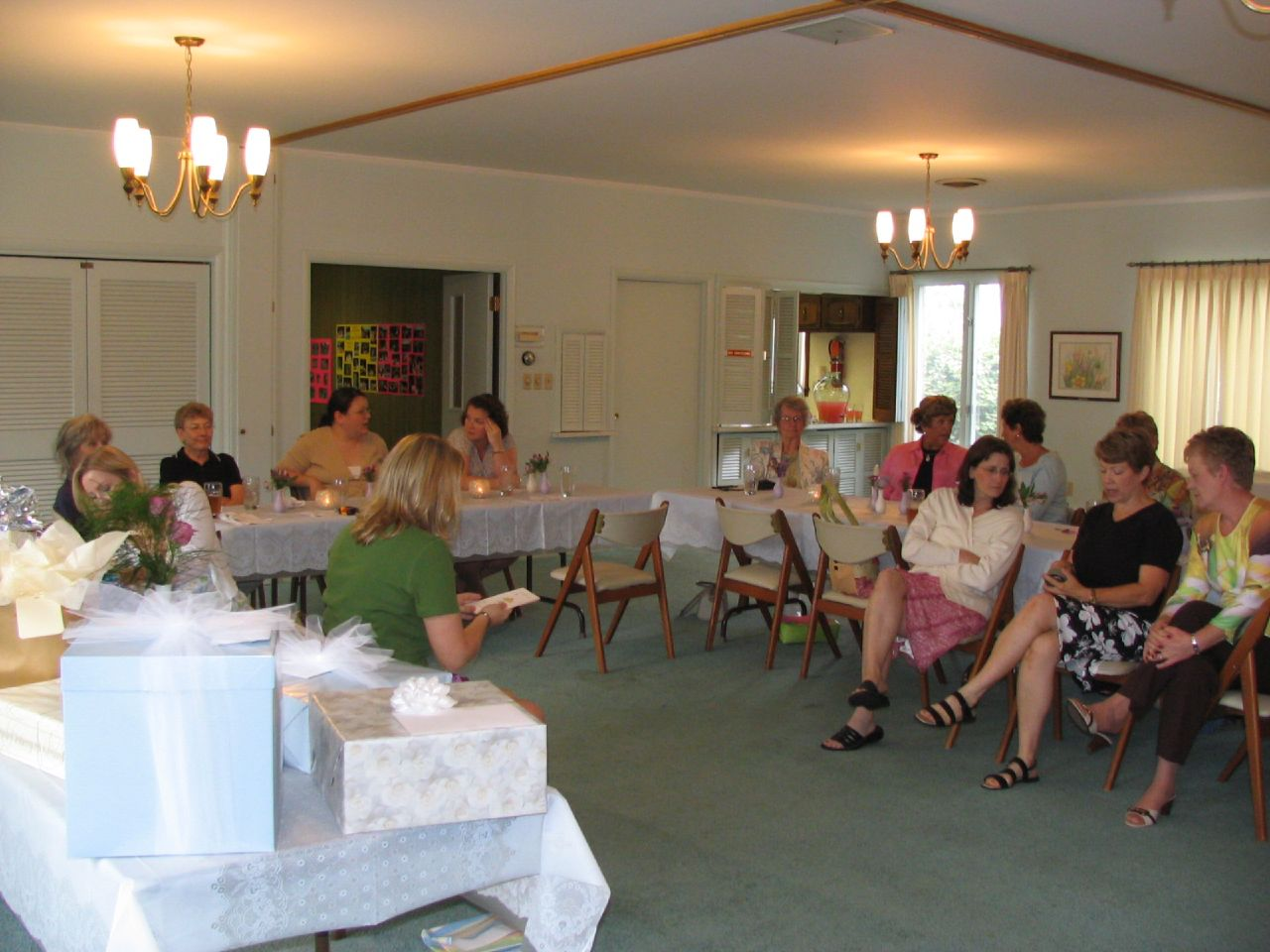
A bridal shower traditionally involves giving gifts to the future wife.

A bridal shower is a gift-giving party held for a bride-to-be in anticipation of her wedding.

The history of the custom is rooted not necessarily for the provision of goods for the upcoming matrimonial home, but to provide goods and financial assistance to ensure that the wedding may take place.

== History ==
The custom of the bridal shower is said to have grown out of earlier dowry practices, when a poor woman's family might not have the money to provide a dowry for her, or when a father refused to give his daughter her dowry because he did not approve of the marriage. In such situations, friends of the woman would gather together and bring gifts that would compensate for the dowry and allow her to marry the man of her choice.

The earliest stories about these events have been known to originate in Brussels, Belgium around 1860. A frequently quoted legend traces the origin of this practice to the 16th or 17th century Netherlands. However, there are also parallels with many dowry practices and the United States colonial or hope chest (trousseau) custom.

A related custom practiced in medieval England was the Bride Ale: in Langland's Piers Plowman (§ B.II.45) there is a reference to a bruydale. This was a feast held before the wedding day, at which the bride made beer and sold it to the guests at a high price.

In the United States, bridal showers started in urban areas in the 1890s mainly among the upper middle classes. By the 1930s, bridal showers had spread to rural America.

The earliest use of this sense of the word in print may be in the Grand Rapids Michigan Evening Press June 22, 1904: "The ‘shower parties’ that through mistaken hospitality the wedded couple are forced to attend ..." and may derive from the custom in Victorian times for the presents to be put inside a parasol, which when opened would "shower" the bride-to-be with gifts.

== Customs and gift-giving ==
Many different customs have developed in different regions and social groups, but the basic format has been relatively unchanged for generations, and emphasizes traditional gender roles. Sociologists like Beth Montemurro write that the ritual of the bridal shower "socializes women into the hyper-feminized traditional wife role," with its emphasis on the future role of the bride-to-be as family cook, homemaker, and sexual partner. Historian Elizabeth Pleck echoes this dynamic in pointing out that traditional shower gifts were "for the bedroom or the kitchen." But this role is more of an homage to the mothers and grandmothers than a reflection of how the bride-to-be will actually behave in the marriage.

Although the format has remained relatively consistent, there have been some significant changes. An etiquette guide from the 1920s suggested showers should be "purely spontaneous and informal," with guests arriving unannounced at the bride-to-be's home, while a planning guide from the 1950s suggests more complex themes and games.

Showers are often held during the afternoon or evening, but not generally as luncheons or dinner parties. They commonly take place four to six weeks before the wedding.

Due to the prior history of showers being "purely spontaneous and informal", showers have not developed the same formal etiquette that has developed with respect to weddings. Invitations may be issued informally, by mail, telephone, or e-mail.

As showers are explicitly a gift-giving occasion, everyone who attends the shower is expected to bring a small gift. People who decline the invitation for any reason are not expected to send a gift or otherwise participate in the party. The hosts are expected to hand over gifts, or favors. These can be small gifts like chocolate coins that have been personalized with the name of the bride and the date of the event or a simple thank-you message.

Food can be served at bridal showers. Treats such as cake and candy buffets can also be served for guests.

== Hosts ==
Hosting the bridal shower falls to one or more close friends of the bride, often one or more of the bridesmaids. Close family members traditionally did not host bridal showers, however, it has become commonplace for mothers of the bride and groom or other members of the family to host or contribute to the event. Some organizations, such as social clubs or religious groups, host bridal showers for every member who is being married.

== Guests ==
Guests are chosen from among the bride's personal friends, family, and other well-wishers. This would traditionally be limited to women guests, with a typical exception being the groom.

The number of guests and their relationship to the bride varies widely. In Canada, among some immigrant communities parties in community halls with upwards of 300 guests were normal, while other cultures emphasized intimate parties with only close friends and relatives.

== Global prevalence and alternatives ==
Though many cultures have events before the wedding, bridal showers are most common in the United States and Canada.

In the United Kingdom, bridal showers have been described as a "consumerist American idea" with "limited acceptability". In the UK, wedding presents are normally selected from a list provided by the couple, and delivered either at the wedding or by the shop, and sometimes displayed at the wedding. Nonetheless, bridal showers are sometimes held, and shower-planning services are frequently offered by wedding planners.

In Australia and New Zealand, a custom related to the North American bridal shower, known as a Kitchen Tea, was traditionally held before the wedding. During a Kitchen Tea, female friends and family members would gather at the bride's family home for an afternoon tea, where they would give kitchen-related gifts to the bride. Recently, the influence of American culture has seen a rise in the prevalence of American-style bridal showers as opposed to the traditional Kitchen Tea.

In India, Mehndi is a bridal-centric pre-wedding event where the bride's female friends and family gather to prepare the bride for the wedding. In the event the bride's traditional henna tattoos are made.

In Denmark and Germany, the only pre-wedding events commonly held is a bachelorette party for the bride and a bachelor party for the groom.

== See also ==
- Bachelorette party
- Bachelor party
- Baby shower
- Engagement party
