= Nightclubs in Greece =

Nightclubs in Greece are divided into two main categories: those with live Greek music, and discotheques or bars playing recorded Greek, American or European music. Nightclub activity is more active in central Athens and the north from October through May, while nightclubs on the southern coast are more popular from June through September.

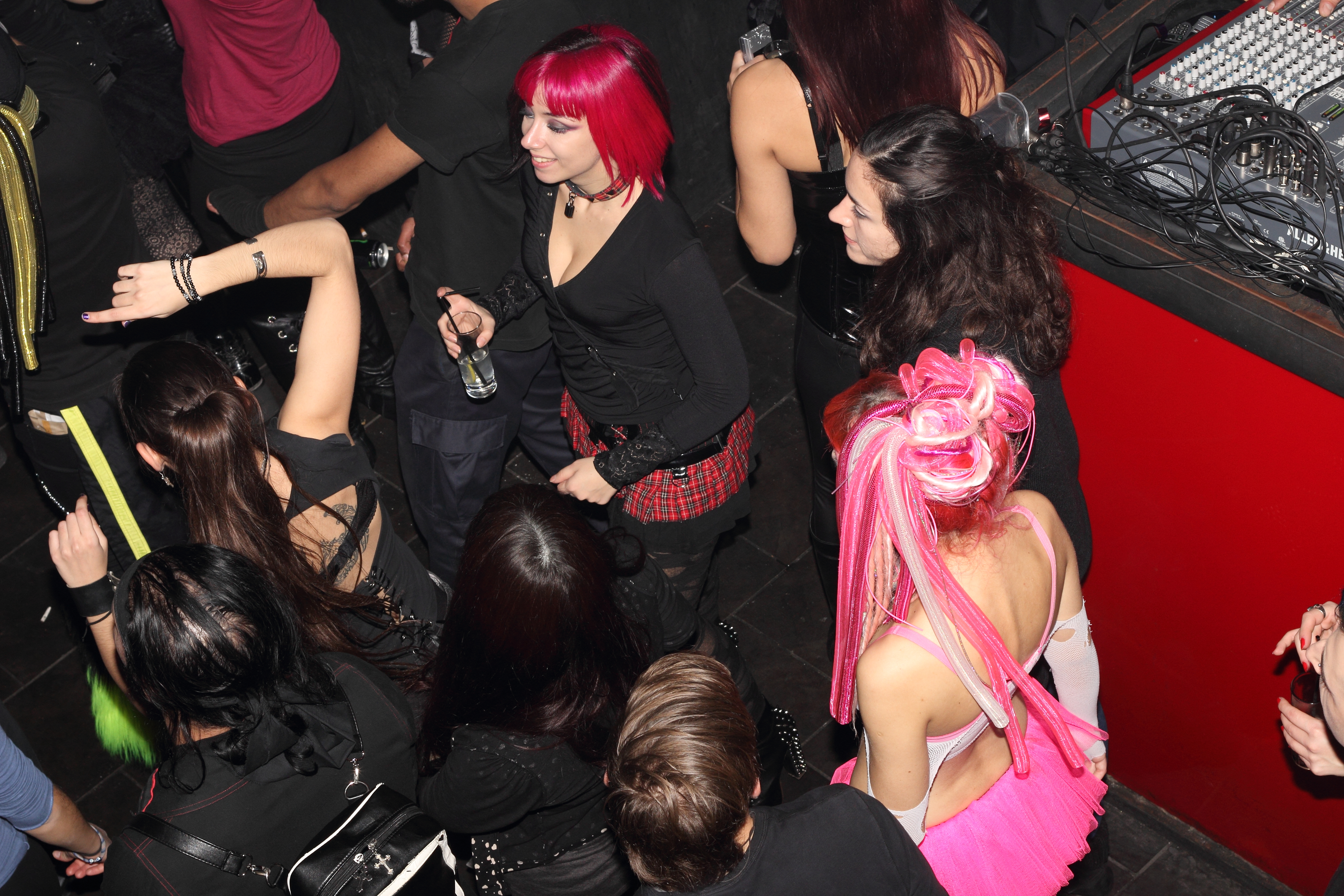
People dance in a nightclub in Psirri, a district of Athens with very active nightlife.

== Bouzoukia ==
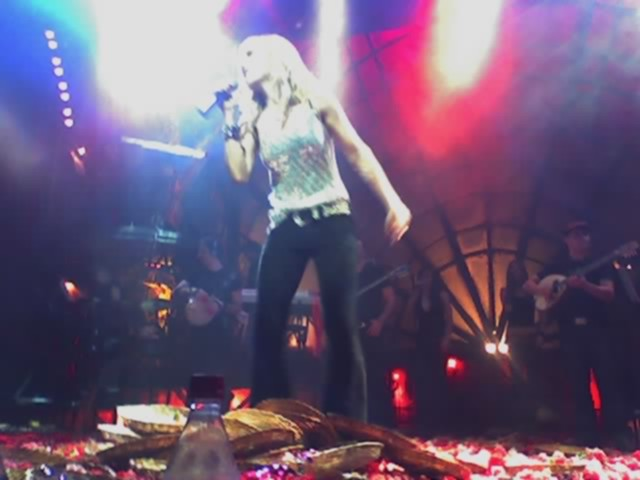
Greek singer Anna Vissi performing live on a pile of flowers in a Greek nightclub (bouzoukia).

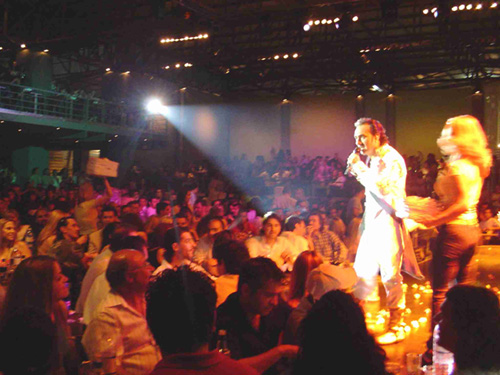
Notis Sfakianakis at bouzoukia nightclub

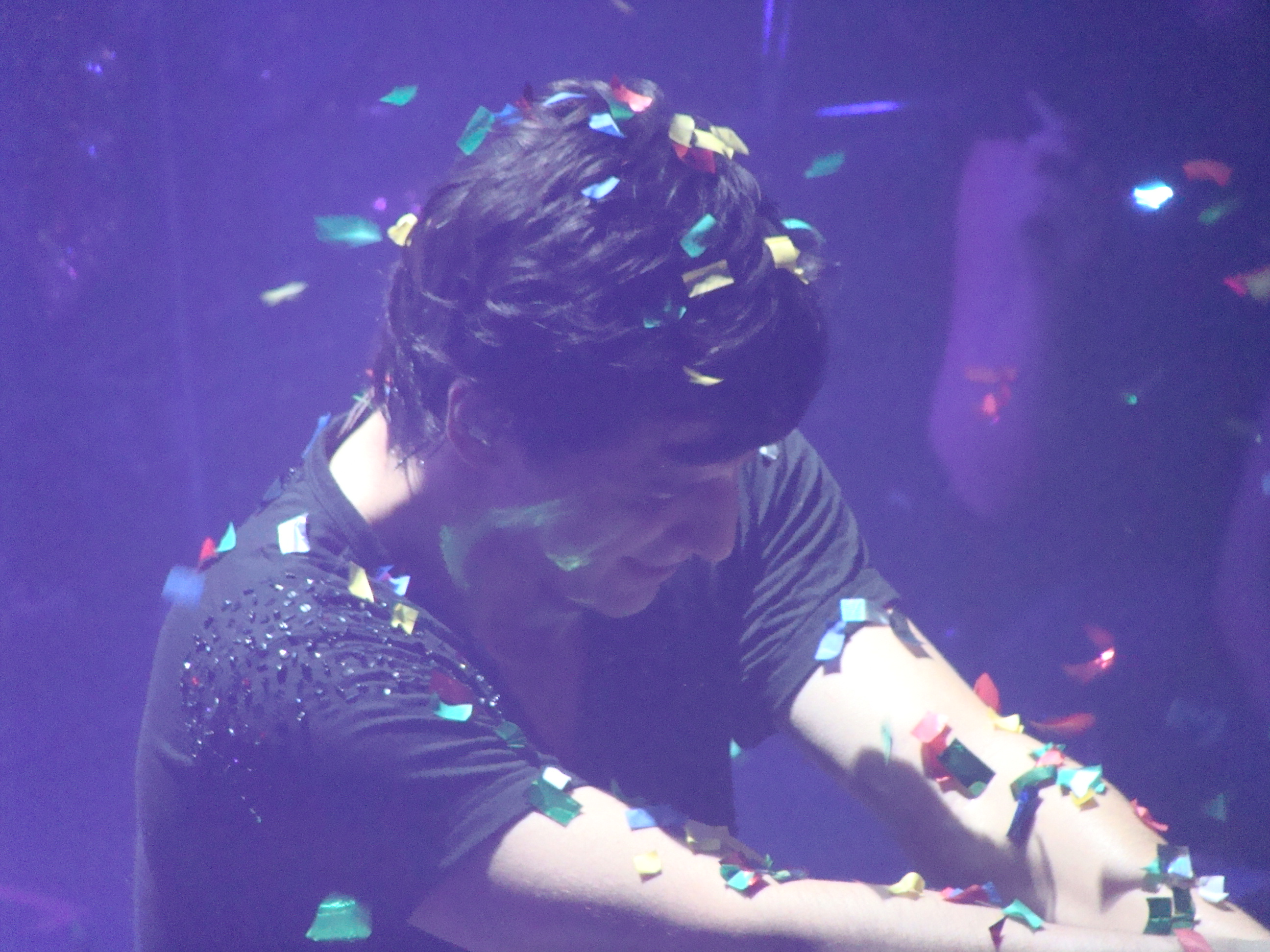
Pop musician Sakis Rouvas, performing at STARZ, a non-tradition-style (non-bouzoukia) nightclub.

Nightclubs that feature laïkó music in Greece are popularly called bouzoukia (deriving from the plural of the main Greek instrument bouzouki). They typically have a raised stage ("pista") where singers, dancers and musicians perform, and a series of closely spaced long tables at right angles to the stage so that every guest can see the show. As there is little space between the tables, customers and waiters have trouble moving around.

=== Dances ===
At bouzoukia the guests go to the stage and dance along with the singers. There are many types of dances danced at bouzoukia like: Nisiotika, zeimpekiko, Sirtaki, Tsifteteli, Greek folk music dance etc.

Many Greek dances are also often danced on the table tops while the other guests clapping. and throwing flowers at the dancer.

=== Tables ===
At nightclubs that have restaurants, it may be possible to make a dinner reservation and avoid having to queue to enter the club later when partying starts around 1am. At most clubs, food is available, but rarely ordered, since the customers usually limit their consumption to alcoholic beverages with assorted nuts or raw vegetables.

Whole tables are reserved days earlier, especially when the singers are popular, and the customers are expected to spend in proportion to the prominence of their table's position. The best tables are immediately adjacent to the stage and in the center ("proto trapezi pista"), and are always reserved for rich and famous (i.e. high-spending) customers.

=== Throwing flowers ===
Throwing plates at the performer's feet was a practice popular until the 1970s when "plate smashing" was forbidden by law. Today it happens rarely, despite the belief of some foreigners that it is a widespread Greek custom.

Throwing flowers or other items that will not cause injury (e.g. napkins) has become more common. Flowers are sold separately by the club's "wardrobe" in trays or baskets of ten or twenty pieces and are thrown en masse on artists, singers, dancers, and other spectators (quite often along with the trays, or even in piles of many trays). They are also used as a means for courtship and flirting. The lion's share of the bill is usually spent on flowers, with alcohol making up the rest. It is quite common for elite customers to spend thousands of euros at the top clubs, and is widely regarded as a status symbol.

Many prominent Greeks were known for their habit of visiting bouzoukia, notably the late tycoon Aristotle Onassis, and the former Prime Minister Andreas Papandreou.

== Pop music ==
Pop music genres began activity in Greece in the late 20th century, however, for the most part artists active in these genres performed mostly at similar venues. In the late 20th century, new nightclubs became more prominent to accommodate more pop programs, thus instead of tables and meals the set up is more like a typical dance club or small concert venue to be more interactive. These venues are less prominent as very few artists would be able to fit into this category of musicians in Greece and traditional practices such as serving alcohol and throwing flowers are still maintained.

== See also ==
- Music of Greece
- Greek folk music
