= Bachelor party =

Party held by a man who is about to get married

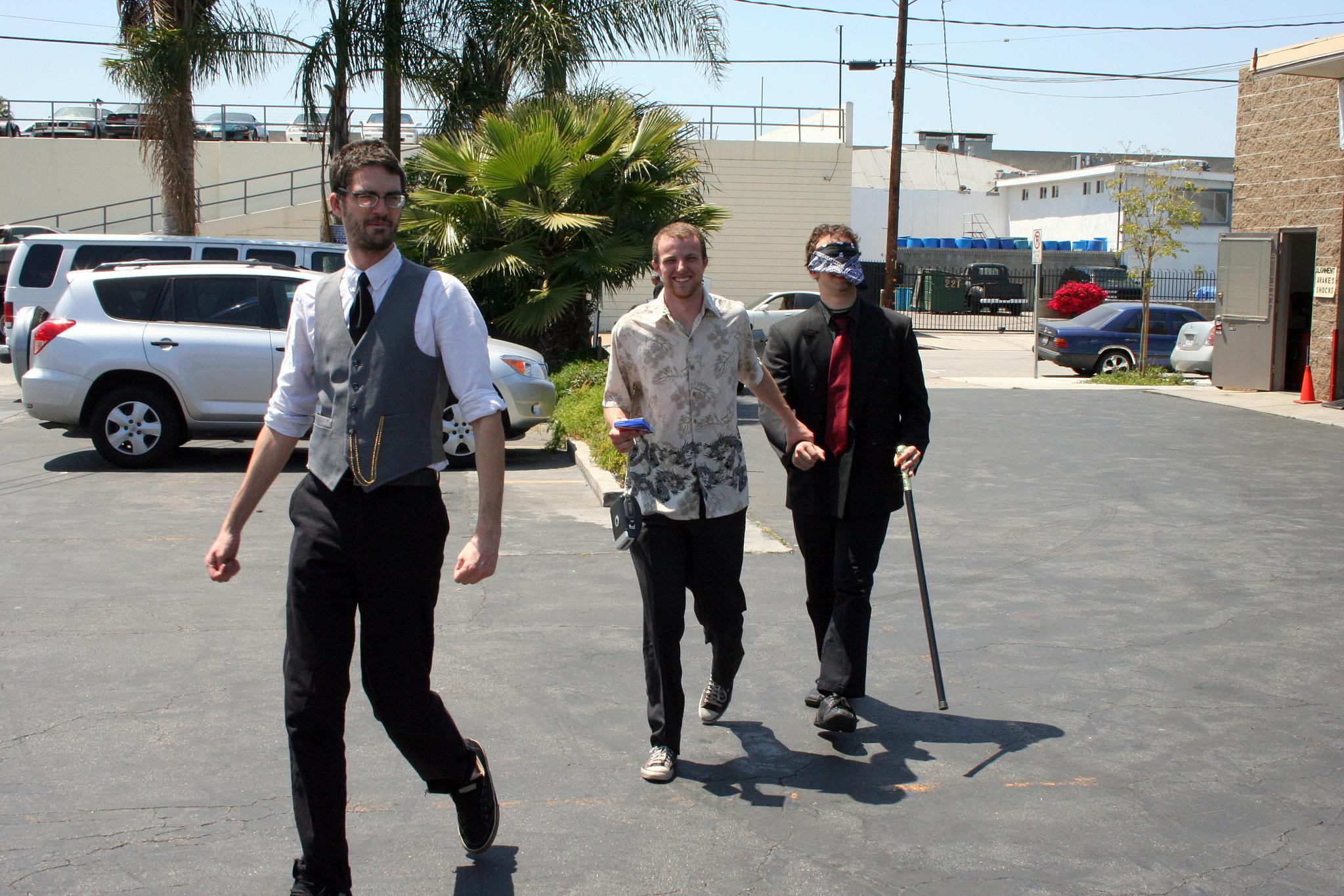
A bachelor being led to his party

A bachelor party (in the United States), also known as a stag weekend, stag do or stag party (in the United Kingdom, Commonwealth countries, and Ireland), or a buck's night (in Australia and Canada), is a party held for or arranged by a man who is shortly to enter marriage.

The party is usually planned by the groom's friends or family.

The first references to Western stag nights in the Oxford English Dictionary date to the 19th century. Traditionally, stag nights involved a black tie banquet hosted by the father of the groom that included a toast in honour of the groom and bride. Since the 1980s, some bachelor parties in the United States have involved vacationing to a foreign destination, or have featured female company such as strippers or topless waitresses.

Historically, especially in the United States, a stag night or event could also refer to a club or lodge party or a larger business convention, primarily for men, where striptease dancers often performed or posed sitting in a giant champagne or martini glass.

== History ==
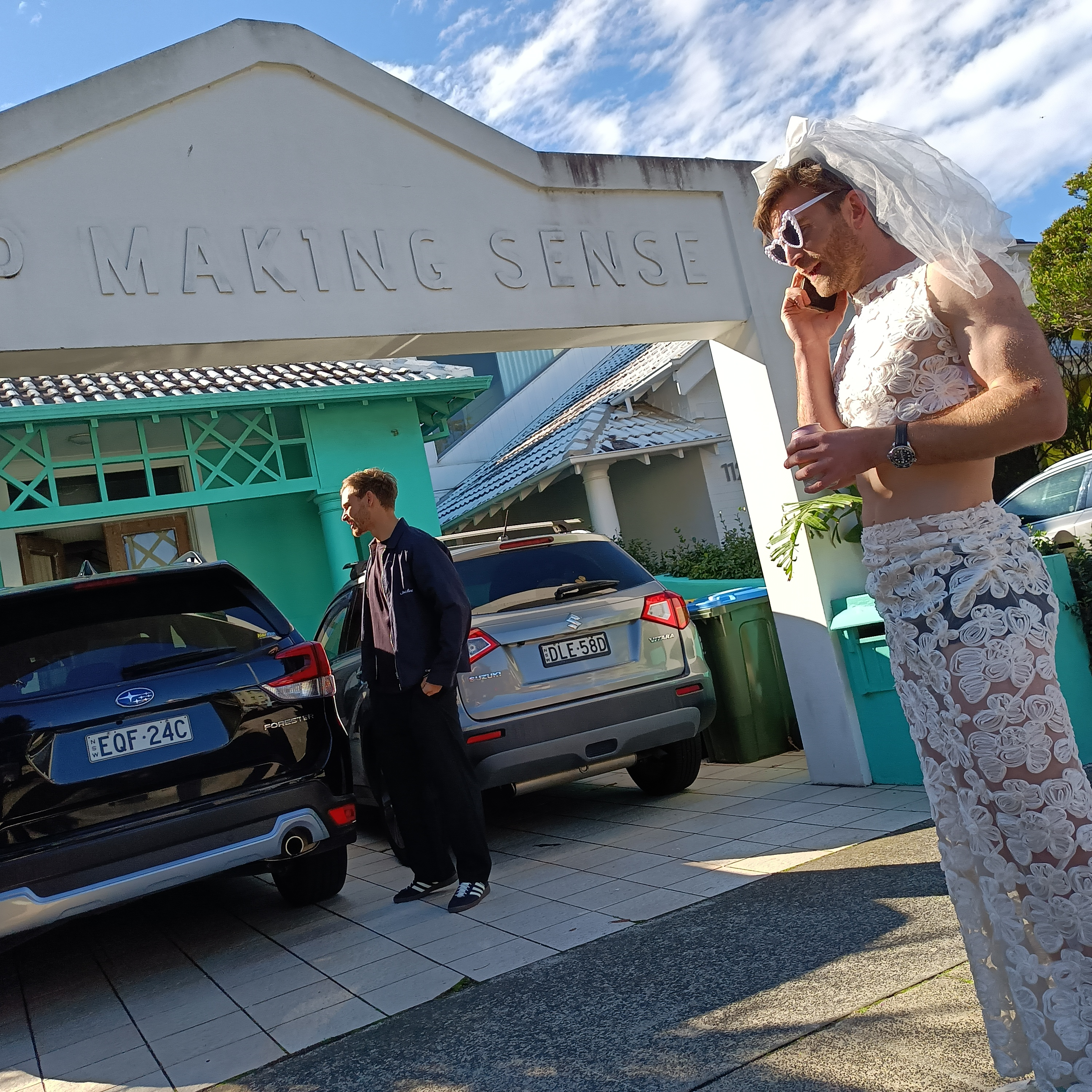
A bachelor wearing clothing similar to a wedding dress, with a wedding veil. Bondi Beach, Sydney. 2026

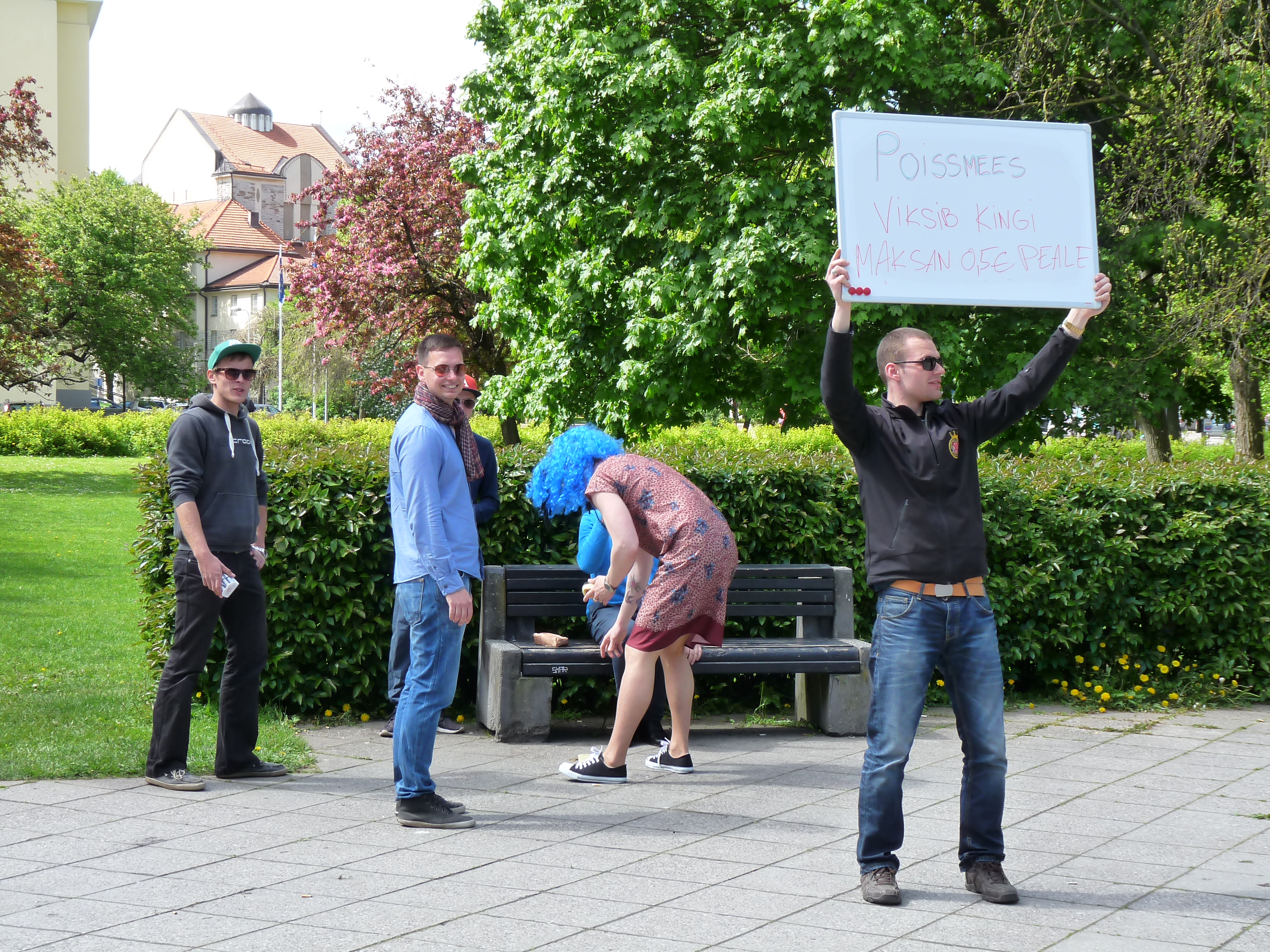
A bachelor in Tammsaare Park, Tallinn, Estonia with a person holding a sign reading "Bachelor. I'll polish shoes for 0,5 Euros." 2015.

The stag dates back as early as the 5th century B.C. The ancient Spartans celebrated the groom's last night as a single man in which they held a dinner and made toasts on his behalf.

In 1896, Herbert Barnum Seeley, a grandson of P. T. Barnum, threw a stag party (known as the "Awful Seeley Dinner") for his brother at the restaurant Sherry's in New York City. The party had a dancer nicknamed "Little Egypt" who allegedly danced naked in desserts. The party was dissolved in the early morning by an officer. Afterwards, the Seeley family brought the police officer to the police board trial for "conduct unbecoming to an officer of the law." At that time, that incident brought the light to the "behind closed doors" matters with bachelor parties.

The term "bachelor", originally meaning "a young knight-in-training", was first mentioned in the 14th century to refer to an unmarried man in Geoffrey Chaucer's The Canterbury Tales. In 1922, the term "bachelor party" was published in William Chambers's Journal of Literature, Science and Arts and was described as a "jolly old" party.

== Variations ==
The equivalent event for the bride-to-be is known as a bachelorette party (or hen night).

In Canada, some choose instead to hold a stag and doe, or a hag party or hag do in the UK ("hag" being a combination of the words "hen" and "stag"), in which both the bride and groom attend. These events may often provide an opportunity to fundraise for the wedding itself.

=== Canada ===
Canadian stag nights may extend into weekend affairs, sometimes involving travel to a cottage or cities around Canada, and occasionally Las Vegas as well. As in South Africa, the itinerary of a stag event is frequently kept hidden from the groom-to-be. The Australian terminology 'buck' rather than 'stag' is sometimes used.

In the province of Manitoba particularly, a "social" is often held rather than a stag and doe, in which the public are invited to attend a large evening party at a rented pub or event venue. Tickets are sold at the door or online, there is usually a cash bar and silent auction, and a traditional buffet of regional snack foods known as a 'midnight lunch' will be served throughout the evening.

=== Francophonie ===
In France and in many French-speaking regions such as Quebec, the bachelor party is called enterrement de vie de garçon, which literally means "(the) burial of the life as a boy" or "burial/funeral of the life as a bachelor". For women it is enterrement de vie de jeune fille, translated as "burial/funeral of the life as a young girl/maiden". Bachelor parties were known as early as the 1830s, when in the Charpennes neighborhood of Lyon groups of young men would dine at the restaurant of La Mere Brigousse on her famous dish of enormous dumplings les tétons de Vénus (Venus's breasts).

=== Germany ===
In Germany, this event is called Junggesellenabschied, which literally means "bachelor farewell". There is also a separate event that the couple celebrates together on the evening prior to their wedding, called Polterabend. At the Polterabend, the guests break old porcelain and earthenware to bring luck to the couple's marriage. The tradition is said to go back to pre-Christian times; by noisily breaking ceramics, evil spirits – especially spirits of envy – are supposed to be driven out. In the last couple of years, Anglo-style bachelor parties have become more and more popular among bachelors. In parts of northern Germany that lack a Carnival tradition, funny costuming has become a popular part of bachelor or bachelorette parties.

Some parts of Germany have a related custom, in which a person who is not yet married by their 30th birthday, is made to dress up in an embarrassing fashion by their friends and to do silly tasks that most often include some kind of cleaning work.

=== Israel ===
In Israel, the bachelors party is called מסיבת רווקים (mesibat ravakim), literally meaning bachelor party. Such parties may feature heavy drinking and sometimes the presence of strippers, or else other recreational bonding activities undertaken together, such as paintball or an overseas trip lasting a few days.

=== South Africa ===
Bachelor parties in South Africa are expected to be a surprise, which is a unique regional variant. The party is planned without the groom's knowledge and is typically a couple days before the wedding. A bachelor party can include many family members and friends, and it isn't limited to the wedding party. It often includes a traditional braai.

=== Sweden ===
In Sweden bachelor parties are known as Svensexa. They are documented since the 17th century; it is believed the tradition began with the bachelorette party, Möhippa, which was then followed by a male version. The parties were first called Svenafton, meaning Sven's Eve. Sven is a Swedish first name, meaning "young man" and also used in connection with male virginity. The parties were disliked by the church as they involved heavy drinking and the participants would show up to the wedding hung over or drunk. In the 19th century it was reformed by the bourgeoisie, and it became known as Svensexa, where sexa was a new word for a late-night party with dinner and alcohol that started at six o'clock with drinks and snacks. There were no activities at Swedish bachelor parties, other than food and alcohol, until the 1960s or 1970s. Since then they have developed to full-day or weekend events, traditionally starting with a kidnapping followed by activities that might involve humiliation of the bachelor. They are usually not held the day before the wedding, but a few weekends before.

=== United Kingdom and Ireland ===
Pranks are a long-standing feature of stag parties in the UK and Ireland.

In the United Kingdom, it is now common for the party to last for more than one evening, hence the increasing prevalence of the phrase "stag weekend", or "stag do". A spin-off has been the growth of the stag weekend industry in the UK with various companies taking over the preparation of the event.

In the UK, stag weekend trips are becoming mini-holidays with the groups taking part in various day-time activities as well as the expected night out or pub crawl around the place in which they are staying. They may involve travelling to another location in the UK or going abroad, with Kraków, Dublin, and Riga topping the list, followed by Prague, Amsterdam, Bratislava, and Budapest. Stag parties abroad have been known to involve visits to brothels and prostitutes, although this is in the minority of cases.

=== United States ===
In the United States, Las Vegas is both a popular bachelor party destination and location for the wedding itself. Increasingly, "destination bachelor parties" are replacing standard nights out, with Americans traveling to Las Vegas, Miami, Nashville, or abroad to Mexico.

Bachelor parties in the US stereotypically entail the mass consumption of alcohol, hiring a stripper, and general rowdiness to which the bride might not have a positive reaction; in fact, the defining feature of the bachelor party is that the fiancée is not present. Increasingly, bachelor parties have come to symbolize the last time that the groom is free from the influence of his new wife/partner. Pop out cakes are sometimes associated.

== See also ==
- Bridal shower
- Bachelor Party, a 1984 film
- Very Bad Things, a 1998 film
- Budapest, a 2018 film
