= Bachelorette party =

Party held for a woman who is about to get married

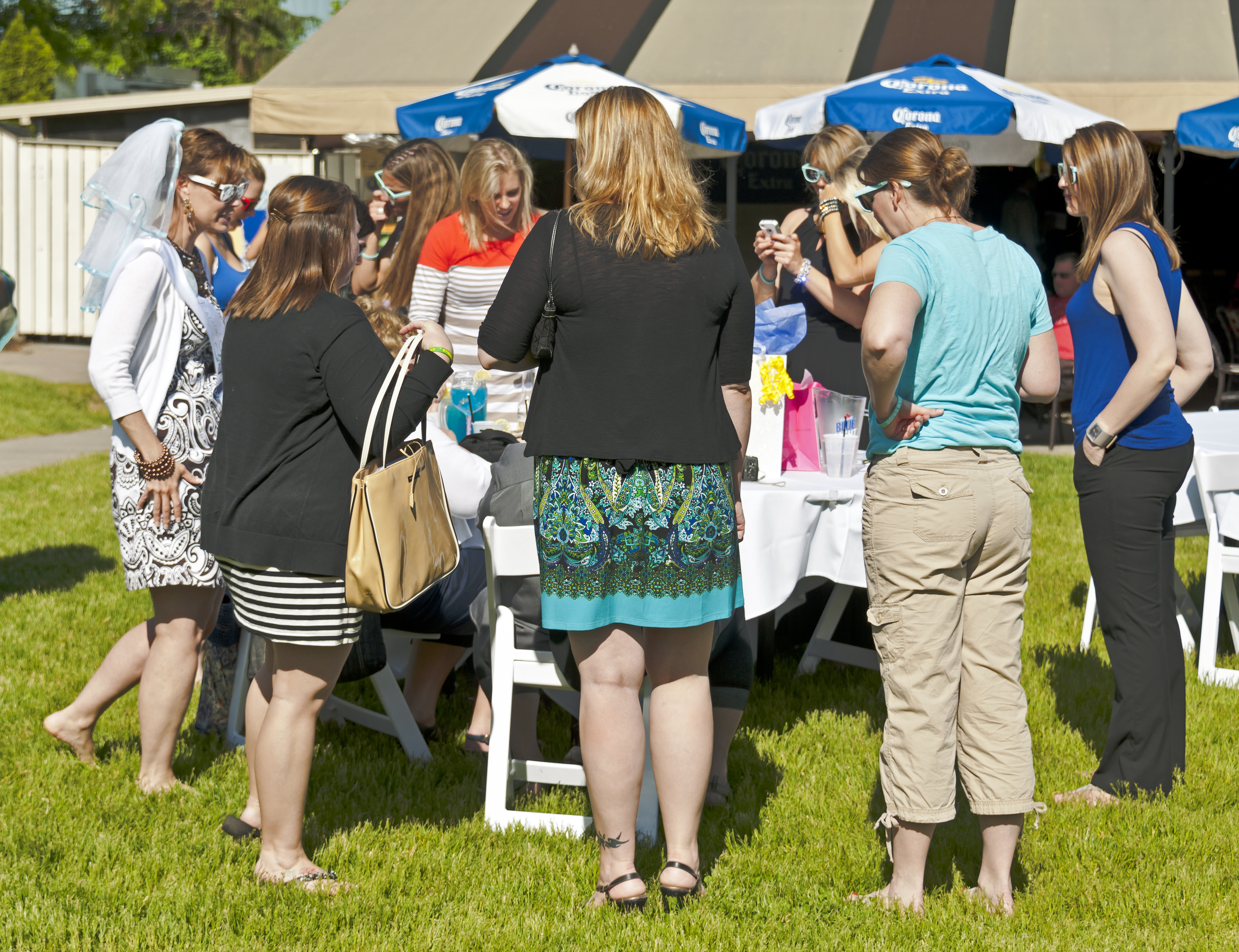
An American bachelorette party, with the bride-to-be wearing a veil, at left

A bachelorette party (United States and Canada), hen do, or hen night (United Kingdom, Ireland, Australia and New Zealand) is a party held for a woman (the bride or bride-to-be) who will soon be married. While Beth Montemurro concludes that the bachelorette party is modeled after the centuries-old stag night in the US, which is itself historically a dinner given by the bridegroom to his friends shortly before his wedding, Sheila Young argues that its British counterpart evolved from a number of earlier pre-wedding traditions for women (Ribbon Girl, Pay Off, Bosola, Taking Out, Jumping the Chanty, to name but a few) whose origins are obscure but which have been around for at least a century in factories and offices across the UK. Despite its reputation as "a sodden farewell to maiden days" or "an evening of debauchery", these events can simply be parties given in honor of the bride-to-be, in the style that is common to that social circle.

== Terminology ==
The term bachelorette party or simply bachelorette is common in the United States and Canada. In the United Kingdom and Ireland it is known as a hen(s) party, hen(s) night or hen(s) do, while the terms hens party or hens night are common in Australia and New Zealand. The term stagette is occasionally used in Canada. It may also be referred to as a girls' night out or kitchen tea (South Africa in particular) or other terms in other English-speaking countries.

Other pre-wedding celebrations, such as bridesmaids' luncheons, are often held instead of bachelorette parties due to the latter's association with licentiousness in some countries since the 1980s.

== History ==
Fourteen women at a "stag party" in the United States, 1913

Before its usage as a term for a pre-wedding party, hen party was used in the United States as a general term for an all-female gathering, usually held at a hostess's residence. In 1897, The Deseret News noted that a hen party was a "time honored idea that tea and chitchats, gossip smart hats, constitute the necessary adjuncts to these particular gatherings". In 1940 Eleanor Roosevelt was described as hosting a Christmas-time hen party for cabinet wives and "ladies of the press".

The bachelorette party is consciously modeled after the centuries-old bachelor's party, which is itself historically a black tie dinner given by the bridegroom, or sometimes his father, shortly before his wedding.

=== Modern adaptations ===
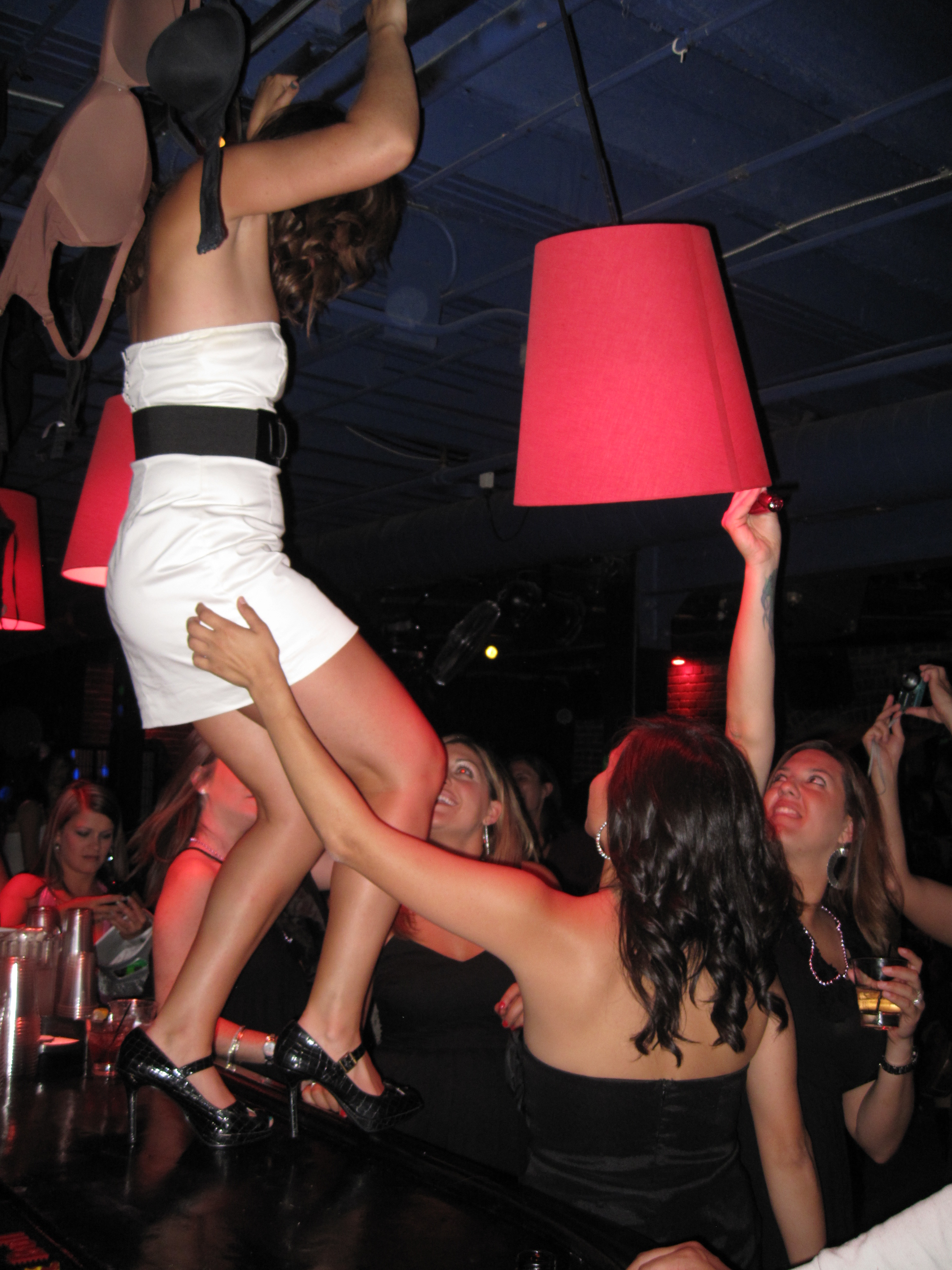
A woman dancing on the bar at a bachelorette party in the US

The practice of giving a party to honor the bride-to-be goes back for centuries. However, certain American bachelorette party customs involving licentiousness among some social groups may have begun during the sexual revolution of the 1960s. It was uncommon until at least the mid-1980s, and the first book on planning bachelorette parties was published only in 1998.

Those uncomfortable with these modern customs of debauchery often celebrate the night before their wedding with a combined stag and doe party, a custom that has become increasingly popular.

The phrase "hen party" mirrors the male "stag party" in referencing social stereotypes of each gender at the party.

Since the 1980s, many parties in honor of the bride-to-be that were labeled as bachelorette parties often involved displays of hedonism such as trading intimate secrets, getting drunk, and watching male strippers. Parties that honored the bride-to-be without them avoided that label. Now, however, the term is used for a wide variety of parties.

Bachelorette parties became especially popular around the turn of the 21st century and frequently appeared in the news.

In 2020 due to the COVID-19 pandemic, there was a rise in "virtual" hen parties with the bride-to-be's celebrating her 'last night of freedom' with her bridesmaids around the world via videotelephony apps such as Zoom and Houseparty.

== Entertainment ==
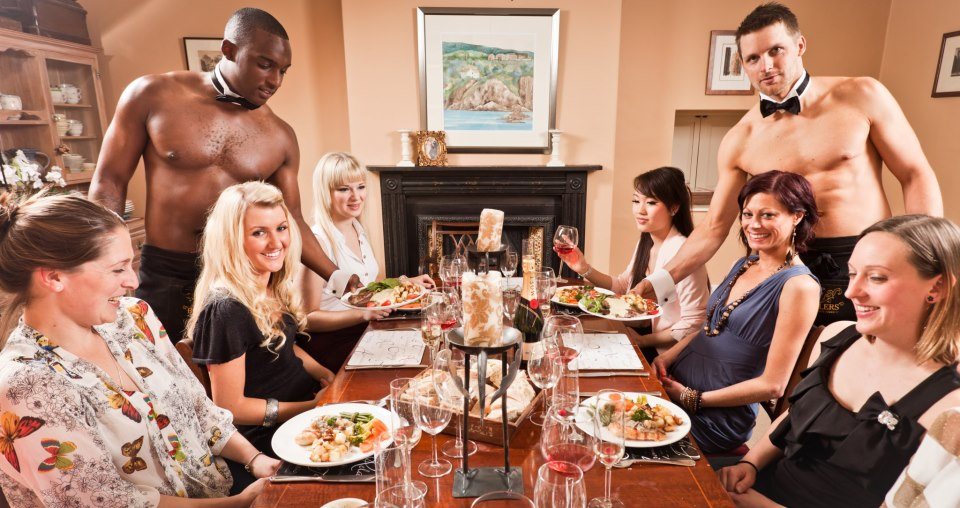
Topless butlers serving guests at a hen party

Many different kinds of entertainment are selected, depending on what the organizers think will best please their guest of honor. While proposing a toast to the bride-to-be is common at most bachelorette parties, some center on drinking games. While notions of a bachelorette party as a night of drunken debauchery have persisted in some social circles since the 1980s, it is becoming widely seen in America as an opportunity for female bonding. According to etiquette expert Peggy Post, "Whatever entertainment is planned, it should not embarrass, humiliate, or endanger the honoree or any of the guests."

Smaller parties, typically with only close friends and sisters, may involve a night or weekend away, or a private tour such as visiting wineries or art galleries. When held in a private venue, such as the hostess's home, the party may take any form that pleases the hostesses and honors the bride-to-be. Dinners and cocktail parties, which provide comfortable opportunities for participants to talk or to give intimate advice to the bride-to-be, are common. Other hostesses choose a themed party, such as a "pamper party", with guests indulging in spa treatments, or a cooking class.

In the 21st century, many companies sell products aimed at the organizers of bachelorette parties, including packs of themed games, pre-printed invitations, decorations, novelties, and sex toys. A common theme of parties is male nudity or partial nudity. In North America, it is common in some social circles to hire a male stripper or attend a male strip club. In the UK, a naked butler has become popular at hen parties. Life drawing parties featuring a nude male model might also be held.

== Organization ==
Participants are typically all women. Bridesmaids, if any, are typically invited, as are the bride's close friends. Sisters of the bride are also often invited, while mothers, aunts, teenagers, etc. are sometimes invited depending on the nature of the event at the discretion of the planner and bride-to-be.

This party is typically hosted by one or more members of the wedding party, although it is possible for any friend to host a party in honor of the bride-to-be. Formally, a party in honor of the bride-to-be is never hosted by the bride-to-be, although she may participate in its planning. While it is normally the duty of a hostess to pay for the entertainment she gives her guests, it is common in most English-speaking countries for participants to share the costs of this event. Whether the bride-to-be pays her share, or whether her share is divided between other participants is determined by the organizers and the bride-to-be during the early stages of the planning process.

Participating in a bachelorette party is always optional, and many brides decline these parties altogether. Neither bridesmaids nor other friends can be required either to attend or to pay for any part of this party.

Since it is derived from a formal dinner, a bachelorette party is often held in the evening, usually about a week (or at least a few days) before the wedding, and usually includes dinner, although alternative approaches are not uncommon.

== Role of alcohol ==
In the early 21st century, some bachelorette parties rivaled the drunkenness seen in Hollywood portrayals of bachelor parties.

However, sober bachelorette parties are not unusual. Many brides and guests are staying sober in recovery from alcoholism or are not drinking alcoholic beverages due to pregnancy or health issues, for religious reasons, or because they do not want to drink alcohol. Sober parties focus on building relationships and activities beyond hanging out at a place that serves alcohol.

== Location ==
Many bachelorette parties are held at home or at a nearby restaurant. Some people turn a bachelorette party into a weekend trip to another city. Some cities, such as Austin for people in the southwestern US and Nashville for people in the Upper Midwest, are relatively popular with US bridal parties that are seeking a weekend destination and can afford to pay hundreds of dollars per person for the experience. Other people will travel farther to cities such as Las Vegas. In the UK, parties in relatively inexpensive European destinations such as Latvia and the Canary Islands are popular.

One reason that bridal parties travel to a different city is because they want to behave differently than they normally would, but they do not want to deal with the social repercussions that might ensue if friends, family members, or professional acquaintances saw them doing this. When large numbers of bachelor and bachelorette parties choose the same cities, this can produce extra jobs and new businesses to cater to them, but it also draws complaints from local residents who are faced with the disruption and public service costs caused by the seasonal influx of noisy parties and drunken visitors. Stag parties caused so much disruption in Riga, Latvia that the city formed a police group specifically to deal with bachelor and bachelorette parties.

== Alternatives ==
A more traditional alternative is the bridesmaids luncheon, hosted by friends of the bride's mother or mothers of the bridesmaids, usually given the day before the wedding. Attendees include the bridesmaids, their mothers and close female friends and relatives; the event is often multi-generational including mothers and even grandmothers of the bride and groom. The purpose of the luncheon is for the bride to thank her attendants, and it is customary for her to present each bridesmaid with a small gift. This is also the time when the bridesmaids' gift, if any, is customarily given to the bride. If there is a cake, it may contain symbolic good luck charms.

If a significant aspect of the party is presenting small gifts to the bride-to-be, then the event is properly called a bridal shower. For the convenience of the bride-to-be, bridal showers are usually held earlier than a bachelorette party.

=== Stag and doe ===
In Canada a stag and doe party, also called a "Jack and Jill", "buck and doe" or "hag" (hen + stag) party, is a fundraising party that includes both men and women. These parties are held by couples wishing to distance themselves from the licentiousness associated with many post-1980s bachelorette parties and are becoming increasingly popular, especially as a means to financially support a wedding.
