= Bridegroom =

Man preparing to be married

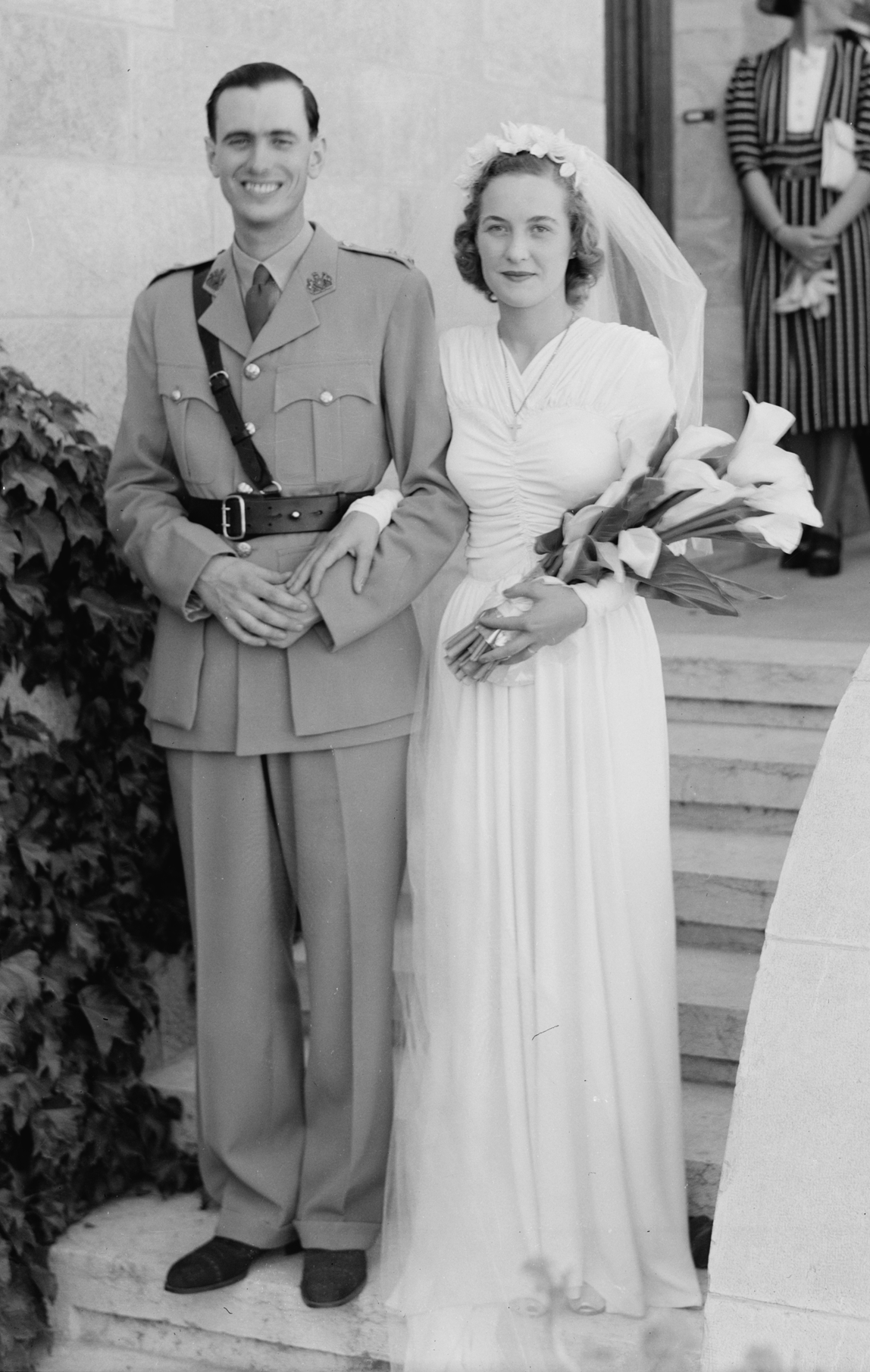
Groom (left) wearing military uniform, with his bride (right) in 1942

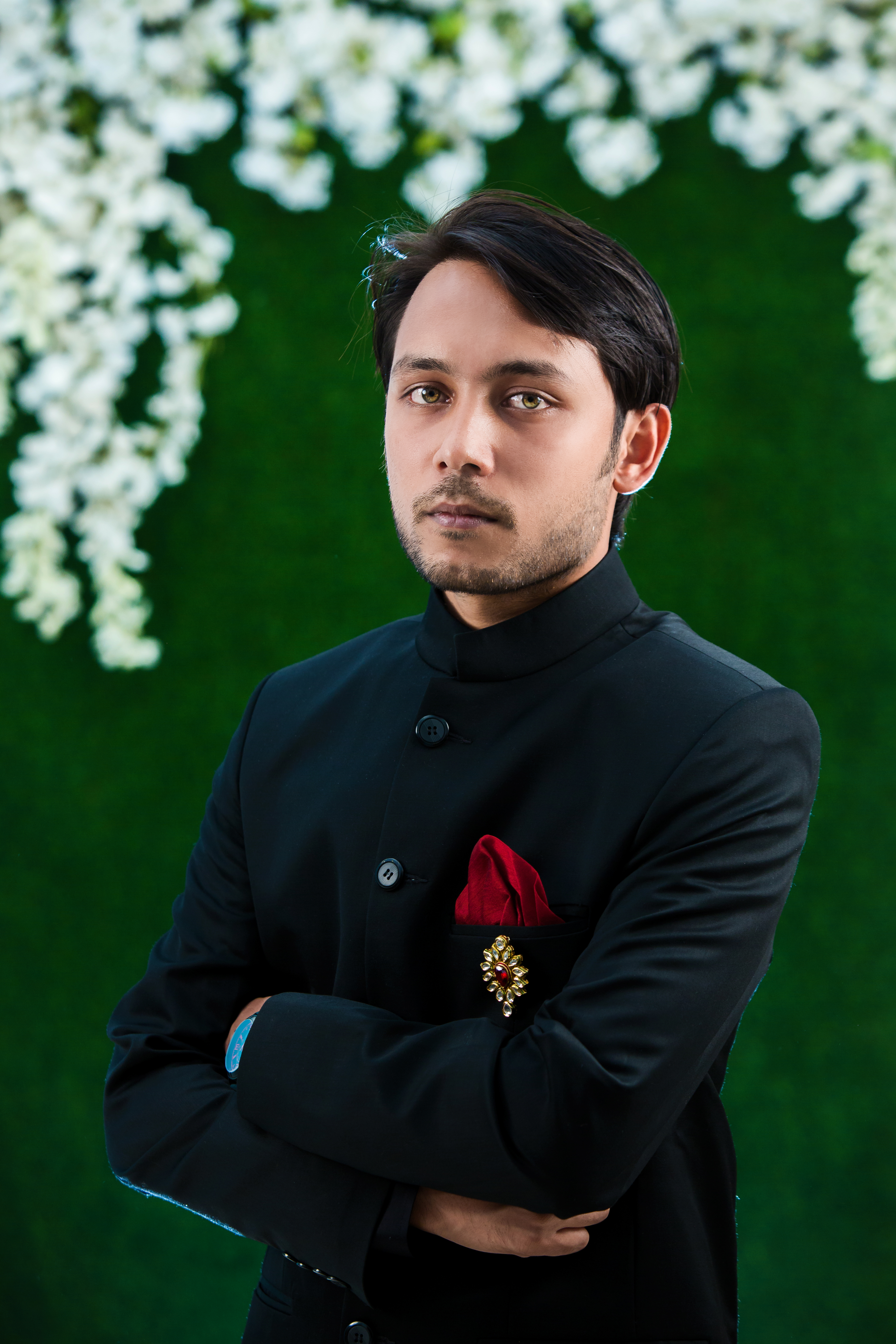
Modern Bangladeshi bridegroom

A bridegroom (often shortened to groom) is a man who is about to be married or who is newlywed.

When marrying, the bridegroom's future spouse is usually referred to as the bride. A bridegroom is typically attended by a best man and groomsmen.

== Etymology ==
The first mention of the term bridegroom dates to 1572, from the Old English brȳdguma, a compound of brȳd (bride) and guma (man, human being, hero). It is related to the Old Saxon brūdigomo, the Old High German brūtigomo, the German Bräutigam, and the Old Norse brúðgumi.

== Attire ==
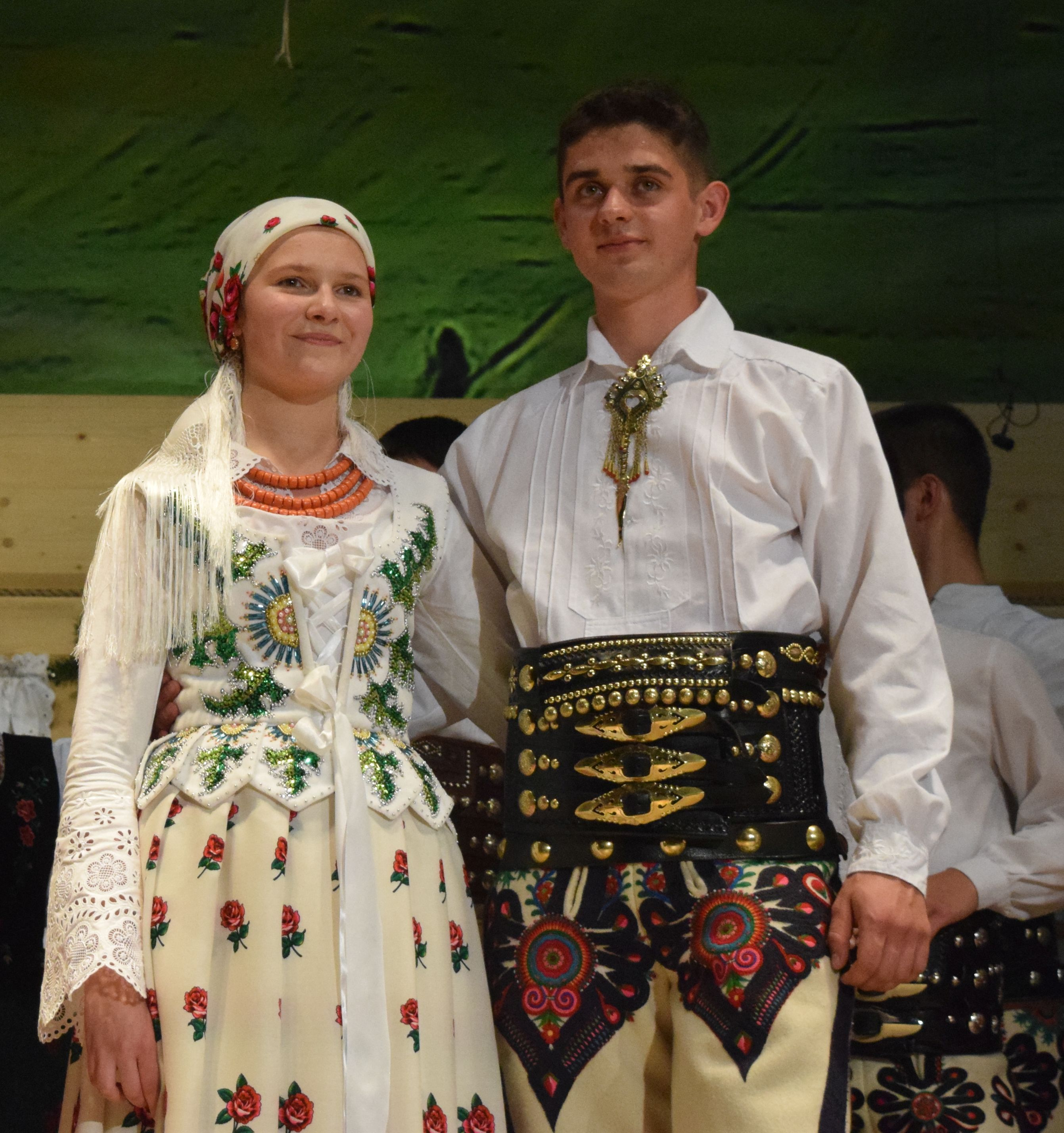
Groom and bride in traditional highlander Podhale costume, Poland

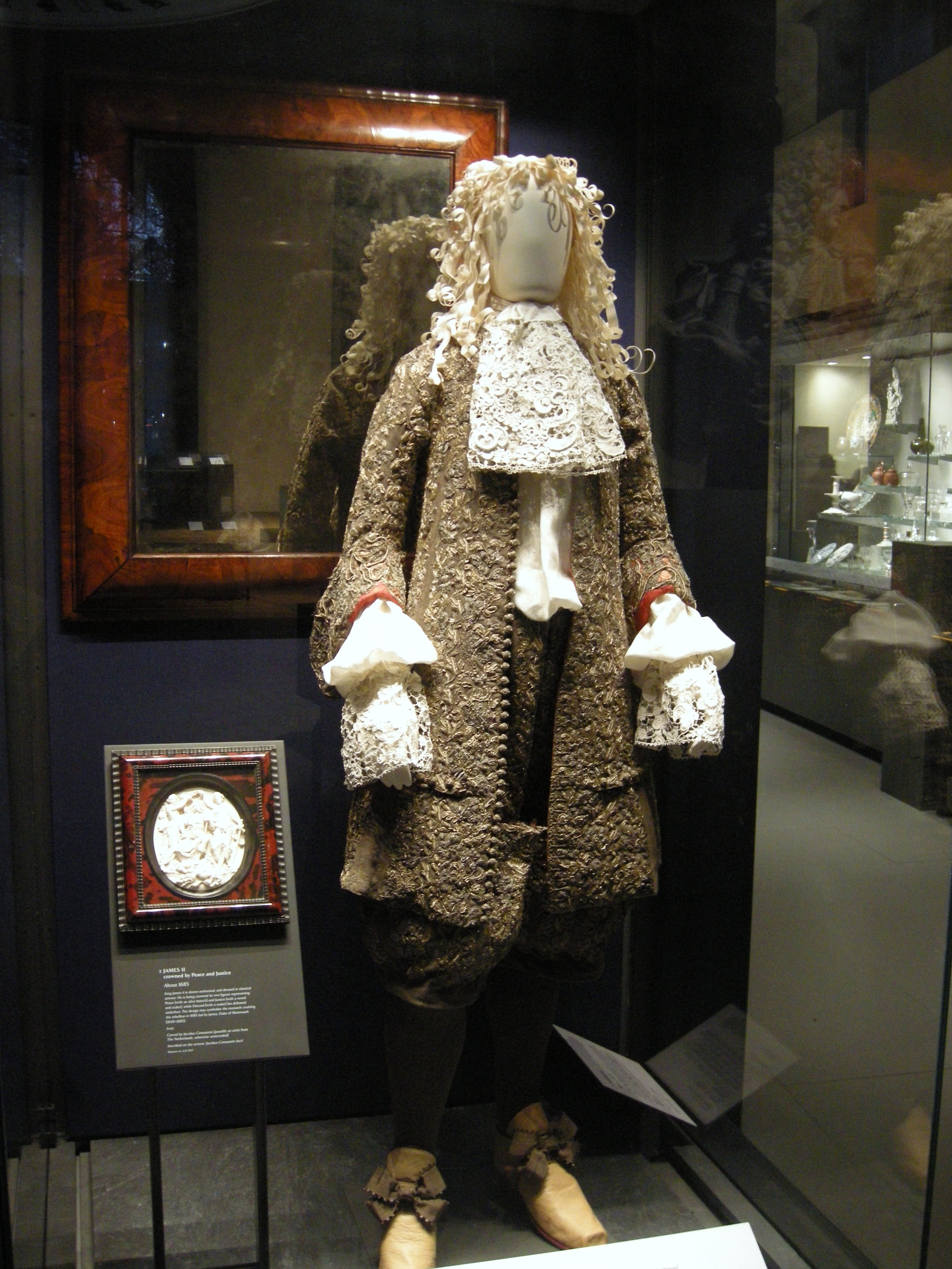
King James II's wedding suit; Victoria & Albert Museum

The style of the bridegroom's clothing can be influenced by many factors, including the time of day, the location of the ceremony, the ethnic backgrounds of the bride and bridegroom, the type of ceremony, and whether the bridegroom is a member of the Armed Forces.

=== National or ethnic traditions ===
- In the United States, the bridegroom usually wears a dark-colored suit for a daytime wedding or a tuxedo for an evening ceremony.
- British tradition for a formal wedding requires the bridegroom, male ushers, and close male family to wear morning suits; unless a uniform is appropriate.
- Bridegrooms of Scottish descent often wear full Highland dress, as do their groomsmen.
- In Norway the bridegroom may wear a folk costume like a bunad, the gákti among Northern Sami or a dark-colored suit or a tuxedo.

== Responsibilities during the ceremony ==
In Anglo-American weddings, the bridegroom will often give a short speech after the reception, thanking the guests for attending, complimenting the bride, thanking members of the wedding party, and possibly sharing a "roast toast", in which he makes jokes at the expense of himself or a member of his party. His speech will normally be followed by one from the best man.

== Religion ==
=== Christianity ===
In Christianity, Jesus Christ is called a bridegroom in relation to the Church as his bride. In the Gospel of John, John the Baptist speaks of Jesus Christ as the bridegroom and mentions the bride.

He that hath the bride is the bridegroom: but the friend of the bridegroom, which standeth and heareth him, rejoiceth greatly because of the bridegroom's voice: this my joy therefore is fulfilled.

Also see Matthew 9:15; 25:1-13; Mark 2:19-20; Luke 5:34-35; John 2:9; 3:29.
