= Toplessness =

Having a woman's torso exposed above the waist

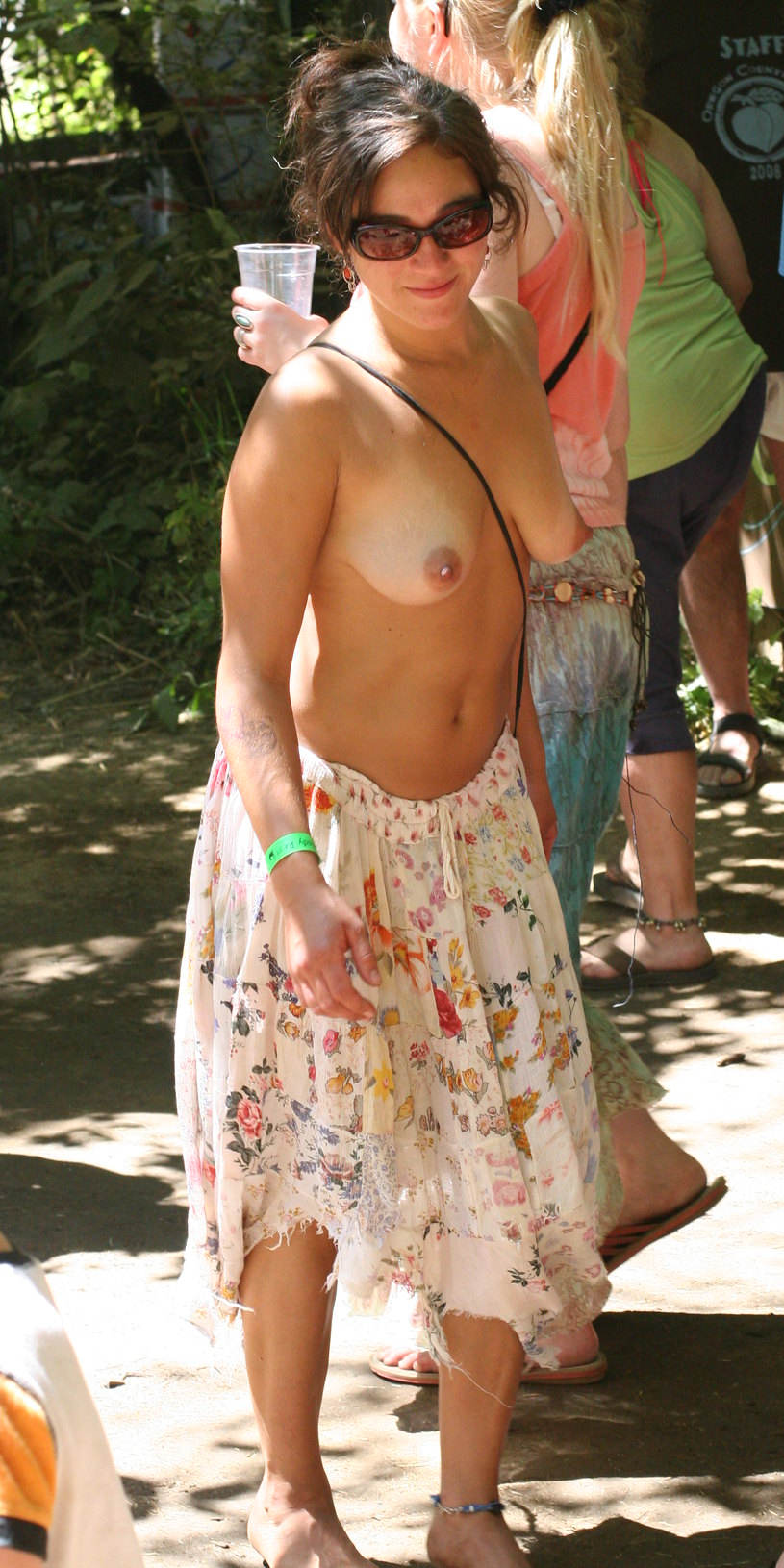
Topless woman at the 2008 Oregon Country Fair

Toplessness refers to the state in which a woman's breasts, including her areolas and nipples, are exposed, especially in a public place or in a visual medium. The male equivalent is known as barechestedness.

Social norms around toplessness vary by context and location. Many indigenous societies consider breast exposure to be normal and uncontroversial. At specific beaches and resort destinations, notably in Europe and Australia, girls and women may sunbathe topless either by statute or by custom. However, in most countries, norms of female modesty require girls and women to cover their breasts in public, and many jurisdictions prosecute public toplessness as indecent exposure. The topfreedom movement opposes such laws on the grounds of gender equality.

Art and visual media throughout history, from painting and sculpture to film and photography, have frequently featured toplessness. Such representations are often defended on the grounds of artistic merit; toplessness may also be defended on educational, medical, or political grounds. Toplessness also features prominently in erotica, pornography, and at adult venues ranging from strip clubs to upmarket cabarets (such as the Moulin Rouge).

== Usage and connotations ==
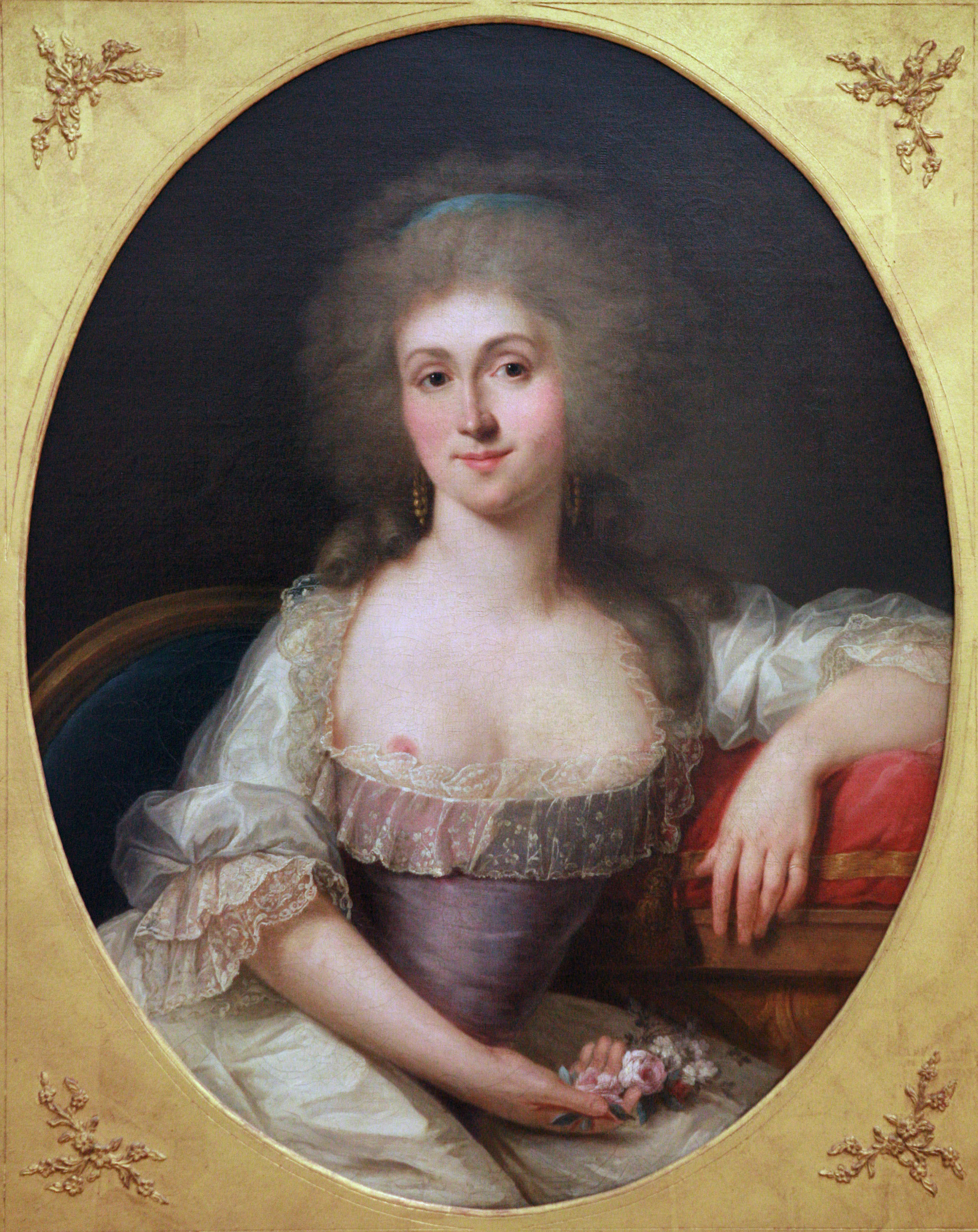
Duplessis's portrait of Marie Thérèse baring a nipple (c. 1775)

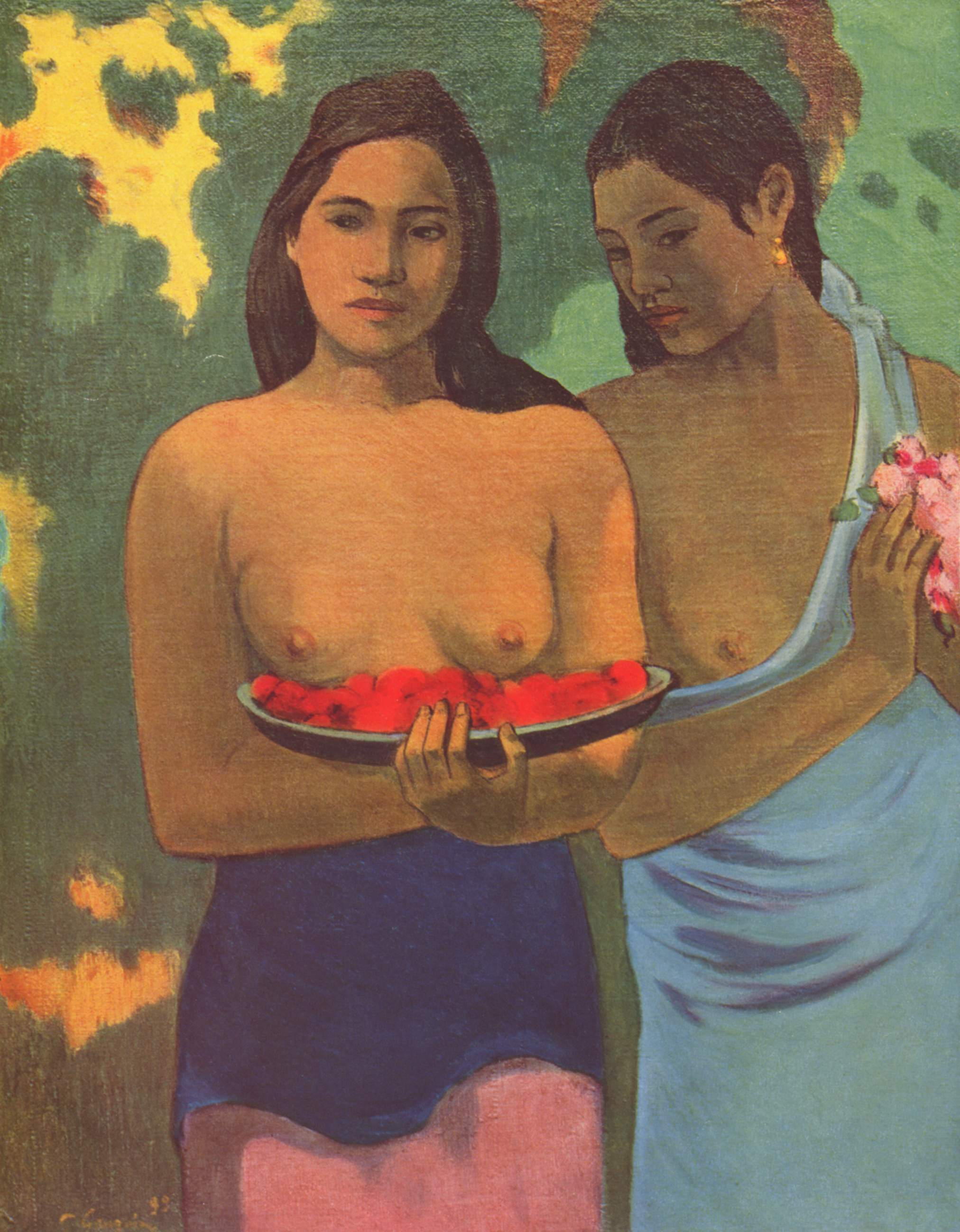
Two Tahitian Women (1899) by Paul Gauguin

The word "topless" usually refers to a woman whose breasts, including her areolas and nipples, are exposed to public view. It can describe a woman who appears, poses, or performs with her breasts exposed, such as a "topless model" or "topless dancer", or to an activity undertaken while not wearing a top, such as "topless sunbathing". It may indicate a designated location where one might expect to find women not wearing tops, such as a "topless beach" or "topless bar". It can also be used to describe a garment that is specifically designed to reveal the breasts, such as the "topless swimsuit" (also known as the monokini) designed by Rudi Gernreich in the 1960s.

The word "topless" may carry sexual or exhibitionist connotations. Because of this, advocates of women's legal right to uncover their breasts wherever men may go bare-chested have adopted the alternative term "topfree", which is not perceived to have these connotations.

=== Barechestedness ===
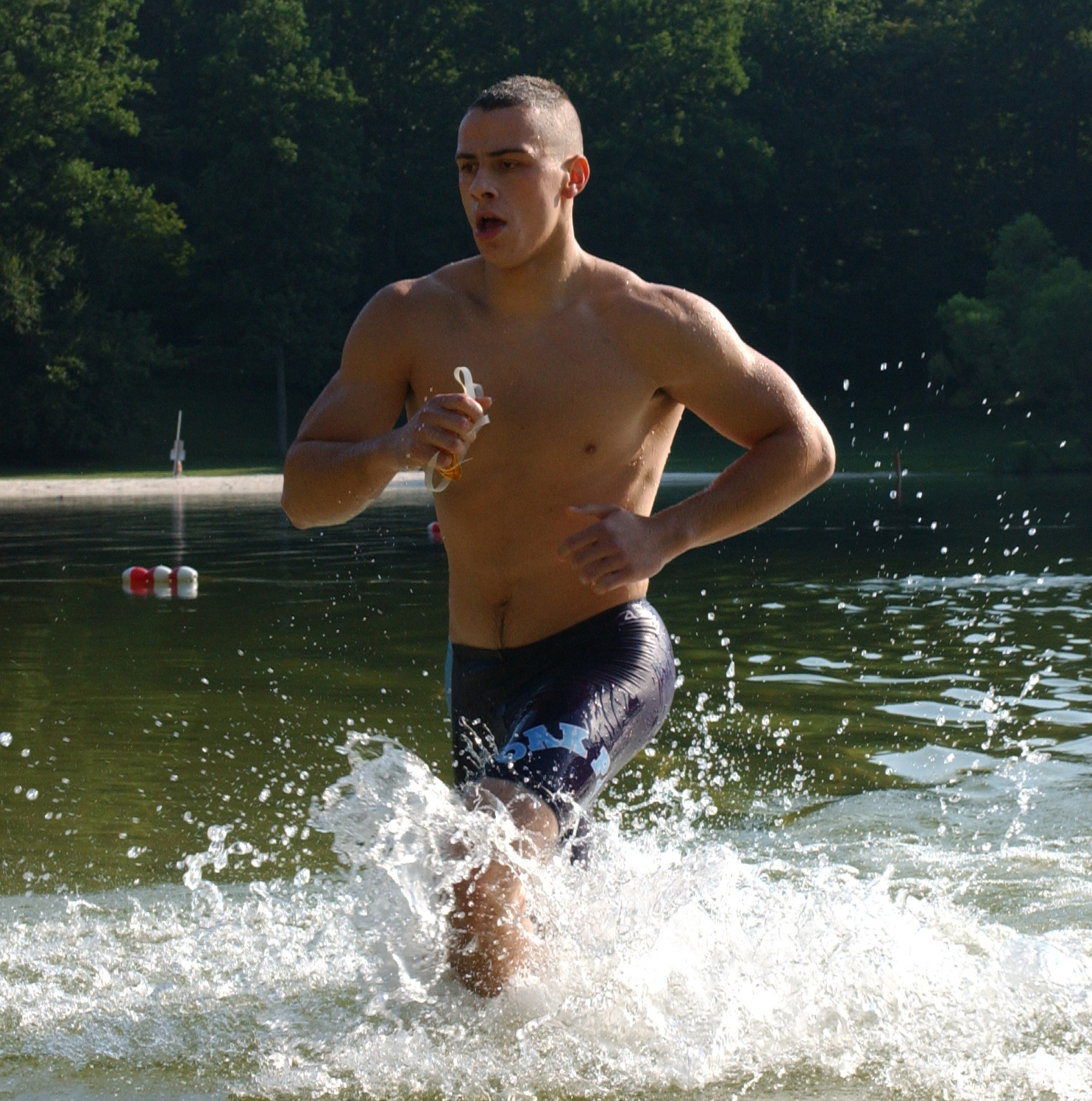
A barechested man running out of the water

Barechestedness is the state of a man or boy wearing no clothes above the waist, exposing the upper torso. Bare male chests are generally considered acceptable in or around the house; at beaches, swimming pools and sunbathing areas; when exercising outside in hot weather; and in certain outdoor construction work settings. However, some stores and restaurants have a "no shirt, no service" rule to prevent barechested men from coming inside. While going barechested at outdoor activities may be acceptable, it is taboo in workplaces, churches, and other formal settings.

In most societies, male barechestedness is much more common than female toplessness, even among children. Exposure of the male pectoral muscles is often considered to be far less taboo than of the female breasts, despite some considering them equally erogenous. Male barechestedness is often ascribed to practical reasons such as heat, or the ability to move the body without being restricted by an upper body garment. In several sports, such as swimming and boxing, it is encouraged or even obligatory for males to be barechested. Barechestedness may also be used as a display of power, or to draw attention to oneself, especially if the upper body muscles are well-developed.

=== Exposure ===
The cultural tendency to hide the female nipple under clothing has existed in Western culture since the 19th century. As female nipples are often perceived an intimate part, covering them might have originated under Victorian morality as with riding sidesaddle. Exposing the entire breast and nipple is a form of protest for some and a crime for others. The exposure of nipples is usually considered immodest and in some instances is viewed as lewd or indecent behavior.

A case in Erie, Pennsylvania, concerning the exposure of breasts and nipple proceeded to the US Supreme Court, City of Erie v. Pap's A. M. The Erie ordinance was regulating the nipple in public as an act that is committed when a person "knowingly or intentionally, ... appears in a state of nudity commits Public Indecency." Later in the statute, nudity is further described as an uncovered female nipple. But nipple exposure of a man was not regulated. An opinion column credited to Cecil Adams noted: "Ponder the significance of that. A man walks around bare-chested and the worst that happens is he won't get served in restaurants. But a woman who goes topless is legally in the same boat as if she'd had sex in public. That may seem crazy, but in the US it's a permissible law."

The legality around the exposure of nipples is inconsistently regulated throughout the US. Some states do not allow the visualization of any part of the breast. Other jurisdictions prohibit any female chest anatomy by banning anatomical structures that lie below the top of the areola or nipple. Such is the case in West Virginia and Massachusetts. West Virginia's regulation is very specific and is not likely to be misinterpreted, stating: "[The] display of 'any portion of the cleavage of the human female breast exhibited by a dress, blouse, skirt, leotard, bathing suit, or other wearing apparel [is permitted] provided the areola is not exposed, in whole or in part.'"

Instagram has a "no nipples" policy with exceptions: material that is not allowed includes "some photos of female nipples, but photos of post-mastectomy scarring and women actively breastfeeding are allowed. Nudity in photos of paintings and sculptures is OK, too". Previously, Instagram had removed images of nursing mothers. Instagram removed images of Rihanna and had her account cancelled in 2014 when she posted selfies with nipples. This was incentive for the Twitter campaign #FreeTheNipple. In 2016, an Instagram page invited users to post images of nipples from both sexes; @genderless_nipples, which displays close ups of both the nipples of men and women for the purpose of spotlighting what may be inconsistency. Some contributors have circumvented the policy. Facebook has also been struggling to define its nipple policy.

Filmmaker Lina Esco made a film entitled Free the Nipple, which is about "laws against female toplessness or restrictions on images of female, but not male, nipples", which Esco states is an example of sexism in society.

== In traditional societies ==
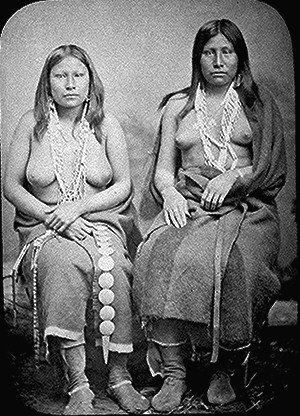
Two Wichita Native Americans in summer dress (1870)

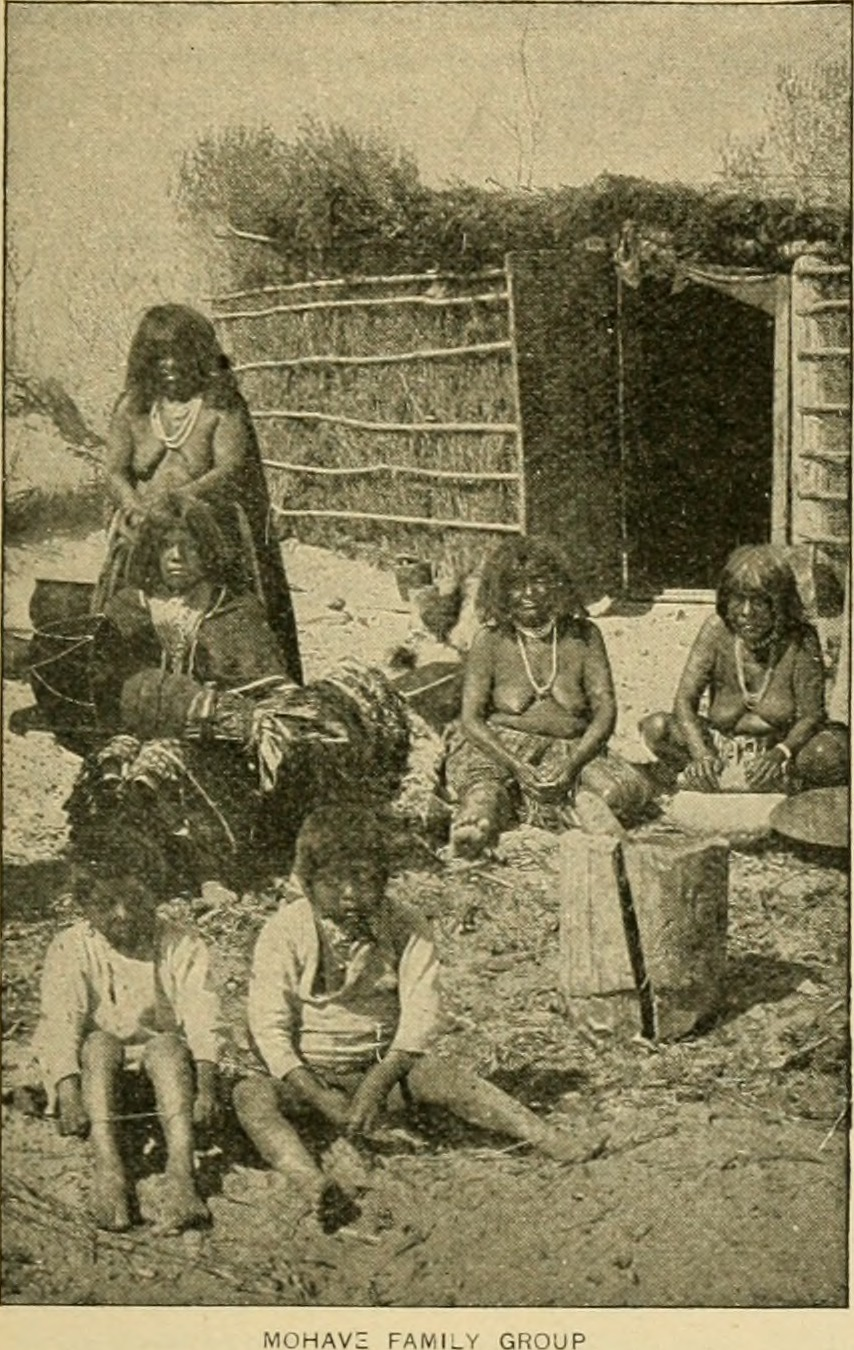
Mohave family, 1901

Attitudes towards toplessness have varied considerably across cultures and over time. The lack of clothing above the waist for both females and males was the norm in traditional cultures of North America, Africa, Australia and the Pacific Islands until the arrival of Christian missionaries, and it continues to be the norm in many indigenous cultures today. The practice was also the norm in various Asian cultures before Muslim expansion in the 13th and 14th centuries.

=== Minoan civilization ===
During the Middle Minoan era (2000–1600 BCE), women wore close-fitting blouses that were cut low in the front and exposed the breasts. The breasts were further emphasized by a narrow waist, similar to the shape that corsets gave women during the late 19th century.

=== North America ===
The practice was also the norm with Mohave people and Wichita people.

=== Africa ===
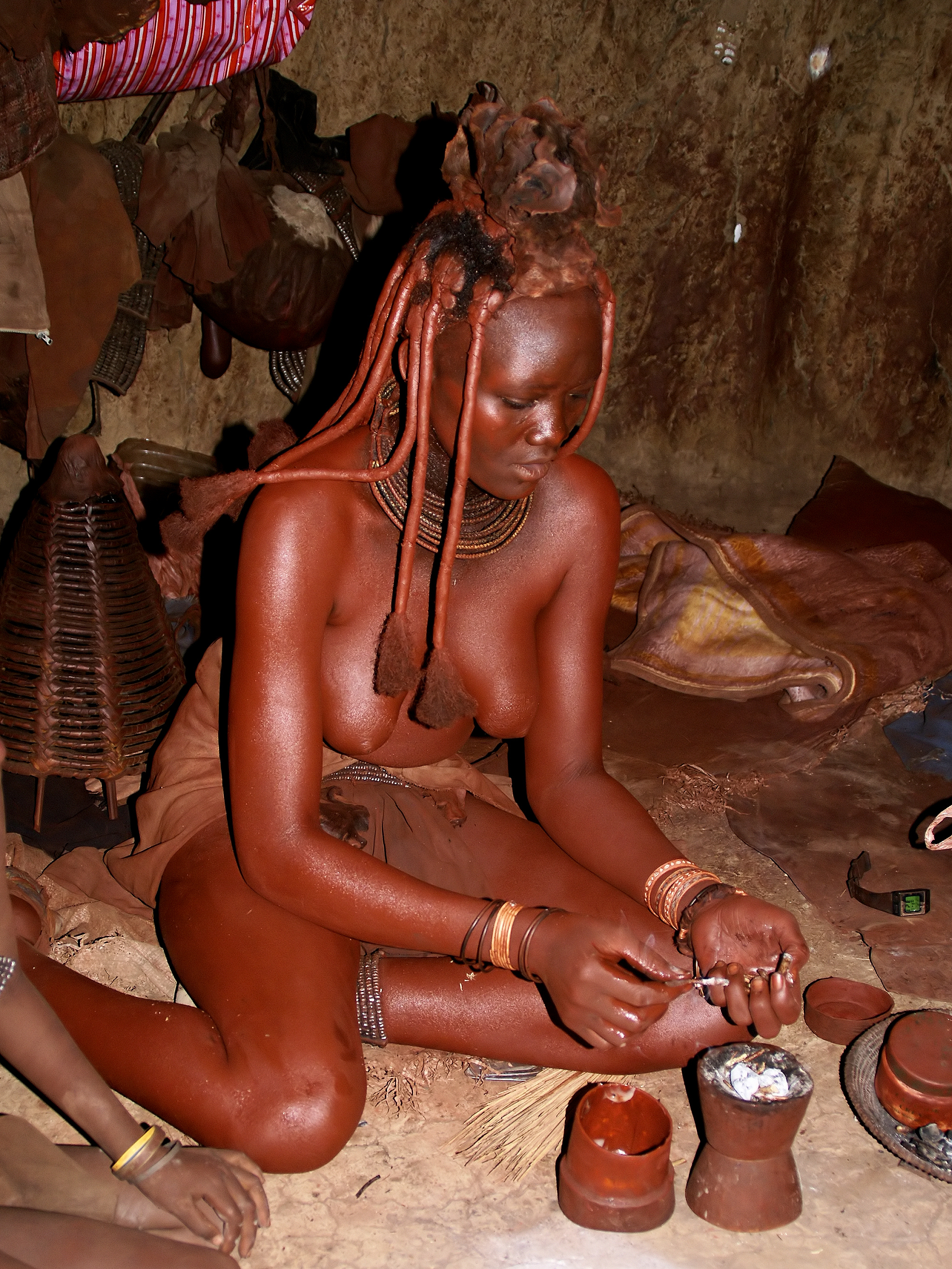
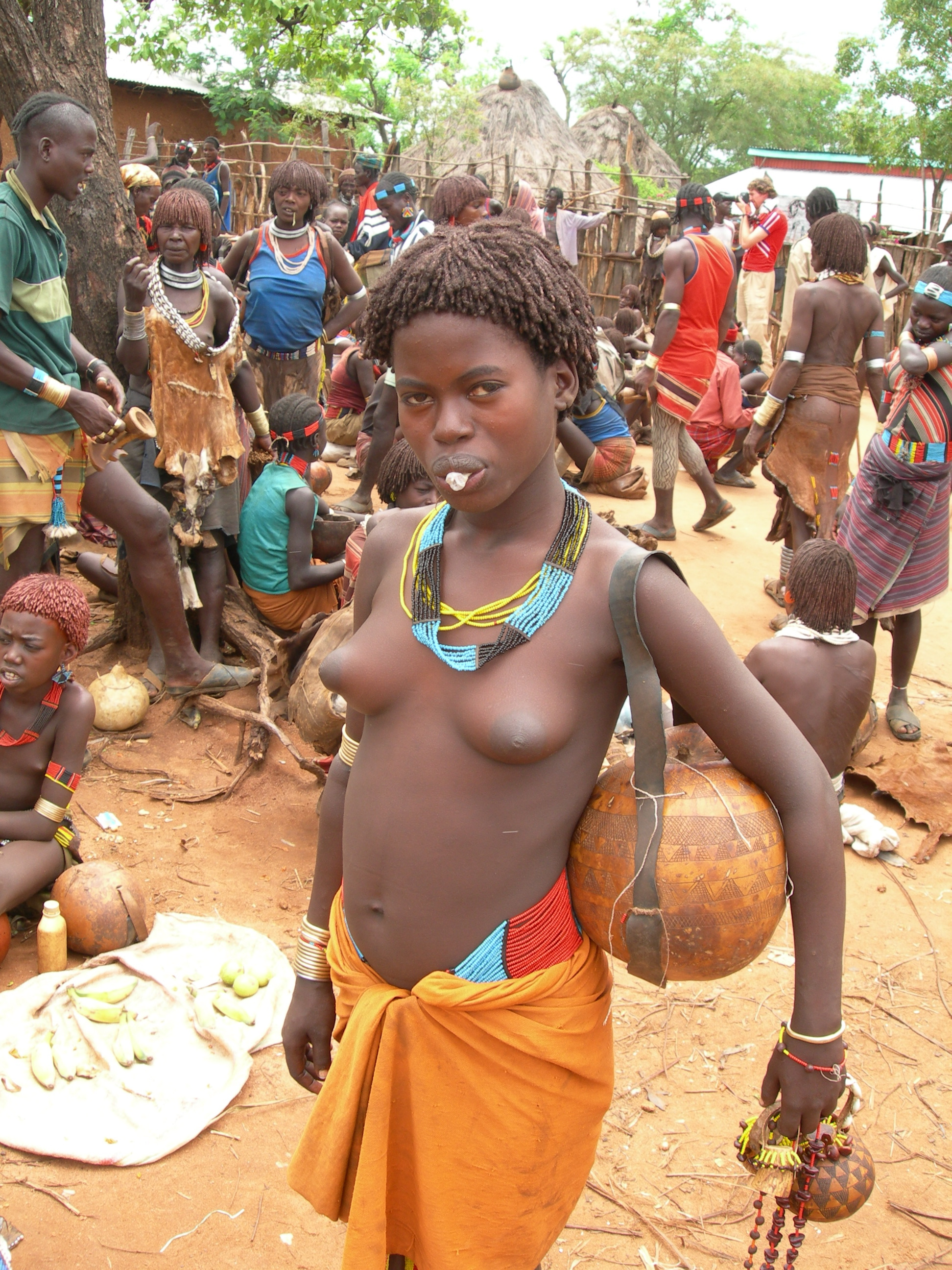
Among Himba of northern Namibia (left) and Hamar (right) of southern Ethiopia, it is a social norm for women to be bare-breasted.

Among Himba women of northern Namibia and Hamar of southern Ethiopia, besides other traditional groups in Africa, the social norm is for women to be bare-breasted. Female toplessness can also constitute an important aspect of indigenous cultural celebrations. For example, in the annual Reed Dance festival mature girls between the ages of 16 and 20 dance topless before the Zulu king.

=== Australia ===
Traditional topless practices can lead to cross-cultural and legal conflict. In 2004, Australian police banned members of the Papunya community from using a public park in the city of Alice Springs to practice a traditional Aboriginal dance that included topless women.

=== India ===
In certain parts of northern India, some women did not wear an upper garment except during winter before the Muslim conquest of India. Women and men typically wore an antriya on the lower body and were nude from the waist up, aside from pieces of jewelry. This was the standard form of dress unless women opted to wear a sari, in which case they covered their upper bodies with a robe.

Toplessness was the norm for women among several communities of South India and Sri Lanka until the 19th or early 20th century. Such communities included the Tamils along the Coromandel Coast, Tiyan and other peoples on the Malabar Coast, Kadar of Cochin Island, Toda, Cheruman (Pulayar), Kuruba, Koraga, Nicobarese, and the Uriya.

=== Indonesia ===
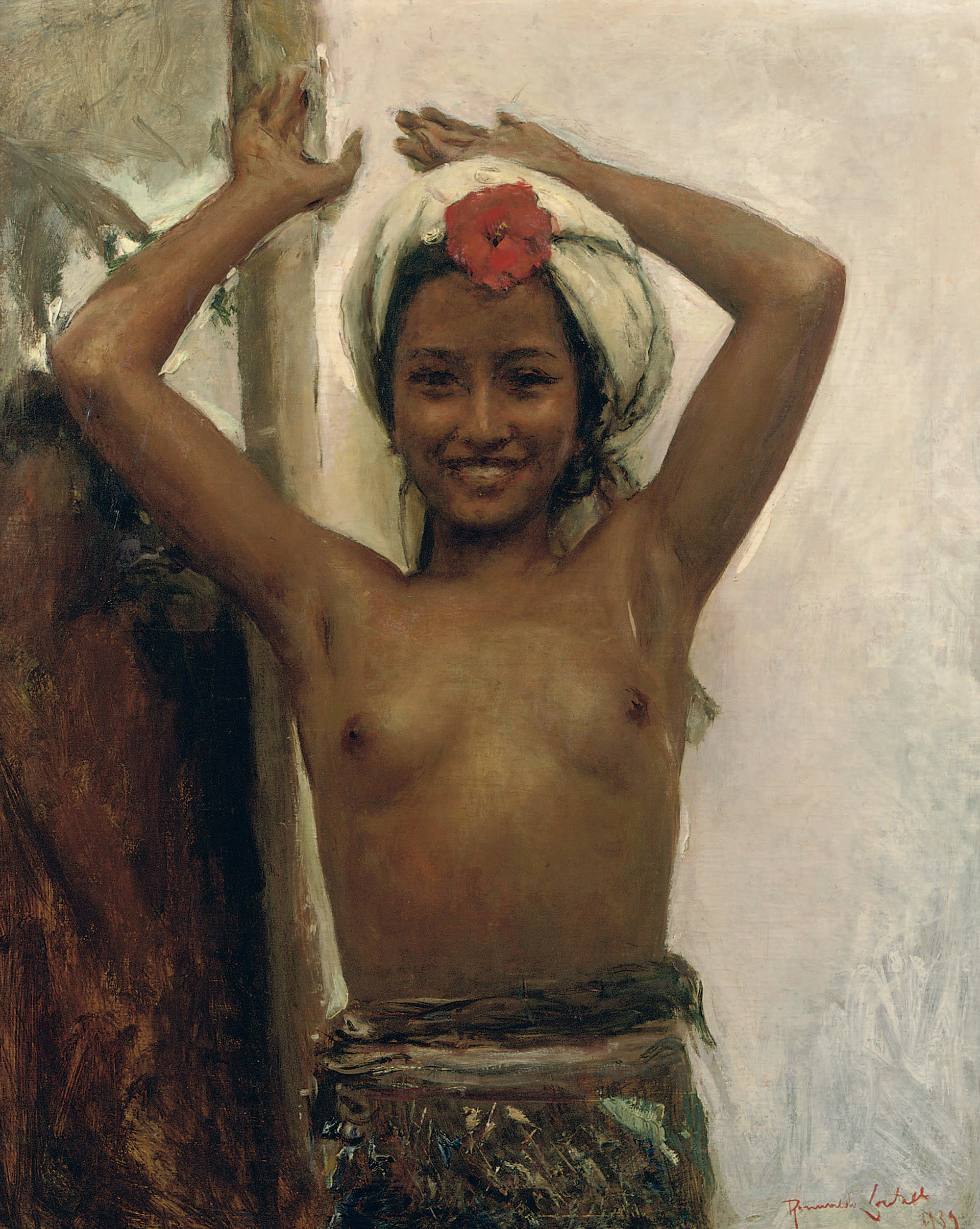
Young topless Balinese girl with a hibiscus, by Romualdo Locatelli (c. 1939)

In the Indonesian archipelago, toplessness was the norm among the Dayak, Javanese, and the Balinese people of Indonesia before the introduction of Islam and contact with Western cultures. In Javanese and Balinese societies, women had gone topless to work or rest comfortably. Among the Dayak, only big-breasted women or married women with sagging breasts covered their breasts because their breasts interfered with their work.

=== Japan ===
In traditional Japanese society, topless nudity (hadanugi) and complete nudity (maru hadaka) were widely accepted culturally and morally for both men and women, with the exception of the samurai aristocracy. It was not uncommon to see women, young and old, with torso exposed. Francis Hall, 1861, described such an encounter: "The screens of the house are wide open to the street for the summer fervors are great and a half dozen women, married as their black teeth denote, are lying face downwards and leaning upon their elbows on the mats. Each one has thrown off her upper garments from her shoulders and is bare to the waist balancing this nudity by tucking up her lower garments till her legs are left bare to her thighs. Their faces are to the center of the room and their feet describe the periphery of a circle."

=== Korea ===
In the 16th century, women's jeogori (Korean: 저고리, an upper garment) were long and wide and covered the waist. The length of women's jeogori gradually shortened: it was approximately 65 cm in the 16th century, 55 cm in the 17th century, 45 cm in the 18th century, and 28 cm in the 19th century, with some as short as 14.5 cm. A heoritti (허리띠) or jorinmal (졸잇말) was worn to cover the breasts. The trend of wearing a short jeogori with a heoritti was started by the gisaeng and soon spread to women of the upper class. Among women of the common and lowborn classes, a practice emerged in which they revealed their breasts after childbirth to proudly indicate that they had given birth to a son, i.e., a male heir.

Travelers like the American Harry A. Franck remarked that they "displayed to the public gaze exactly that portion of the torso which the women of most nations take pains to conceal".

=== Laos ===
In Laos, Frenchman Henri Mouhot took a picture in 1858 of Laotian women that depicted virgins with clothed breasts and married women with their entire breasts exposed in public, because the baring of breasts for breastfeeding was considered to be nonsexual.

=== Middle East ===
In most Middle Eastern countries, toplessness has not been socially accepted since at least the beginning of Islam (7th century), because of Islamic standards for female modesty. However, toplessness was the norm in some pre-Islamic cultures in Arabia, Egypt, Assyria and Mesopotamia. Tunisia and Egypt are an exception among Arabic states, allowing foreign tourists to swim topless on private beaches.

=== South Pacific ===
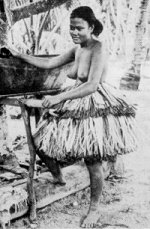
A portrait of a woman on Tuvalu in 1894 by Count Rudolf Festetics de Tolna

In the South Pacific, toplessness was common prior to contact with Western missionaries, but is less common today. On the French territory of Moorea, toplessness is common. In the Marshall Islands, women were traditionally topless before contact with Western missionaries and still do not sexually objectify female breasts as is common in much of Western society. Marshall Island women typically swim in their muumuus which today are made of a fine polyester that dries quickly. Wearing of bikinis and one-piece, breast-covering swimsuits in the Marshall Islands is mainly seen at Western, restricted-access beaches and swimming pools like those at private resorts or on United States government facilities on the Kwajalein Atoll within the Ronald Reagan Ballistic Missile Defense Test Site.

=== Thailand ===
In traditional Thai society, women dressed similarly to men, wearing only a loose lower garment while normally being bare-breasted. Before the introduction of Western dress codes, Thai women were depicted both fully clothed and topless in public. Until the early 20th century, women from northern Thailand wore a long tube-skirt (Pha-Sin), tied high above their waist and below their breasts, which were uncovered. Modernization under King Chulalongkorn encouraged local women to cover their breasts with blouses. Between 1939 and 1942, the government of Field Marshal Plaek Pibulsonggram issued a series of cultural standards; Mandate 10, issued on 8 September 1941, instructed Thai people not to appear in public places "without being appropriately dressed". Inappropriate dress included "wearing no shirt or wearing a wraparound cloth".

=== Vietnam ===
During the Vietnam War, American G.I.s encountered native inhabitants of the Central Highlands, the Montagnard women, that Infantry Lieutenant A.T. Lawrence described as "completely uninhibited in their bare-breasted nakedness".

== In Western societies ==
In most Western societies, it is a cultural norm for girls after puberty, if not earlier, to have their breasts covered especially while in a public place, as an act of modesty. At least, it is not culturally acceptable for women to expose their nipples and areolas in public. Though many women do not regard their breasts as sexual, most would not go against the social norm, let alone challenge various laws that cover toplessness. Until recent times, women who went topless in a public place may have been cited for indecent exposure, lewdness or similar laws. Women and the law in most Western countries generally do not regard breasts as indecent. Some women campaign for what they call "topfreedom", seeking to change these laws. The strictness of the etiquette varies depending on the social context. For example, at specific cultural events the norm may be relaxed, such as at Fantasy Fest, at Mardi Gras in New Orleans and at the Carnaval in Rio de Janeiro. The same may also apply at designated topless beaches.

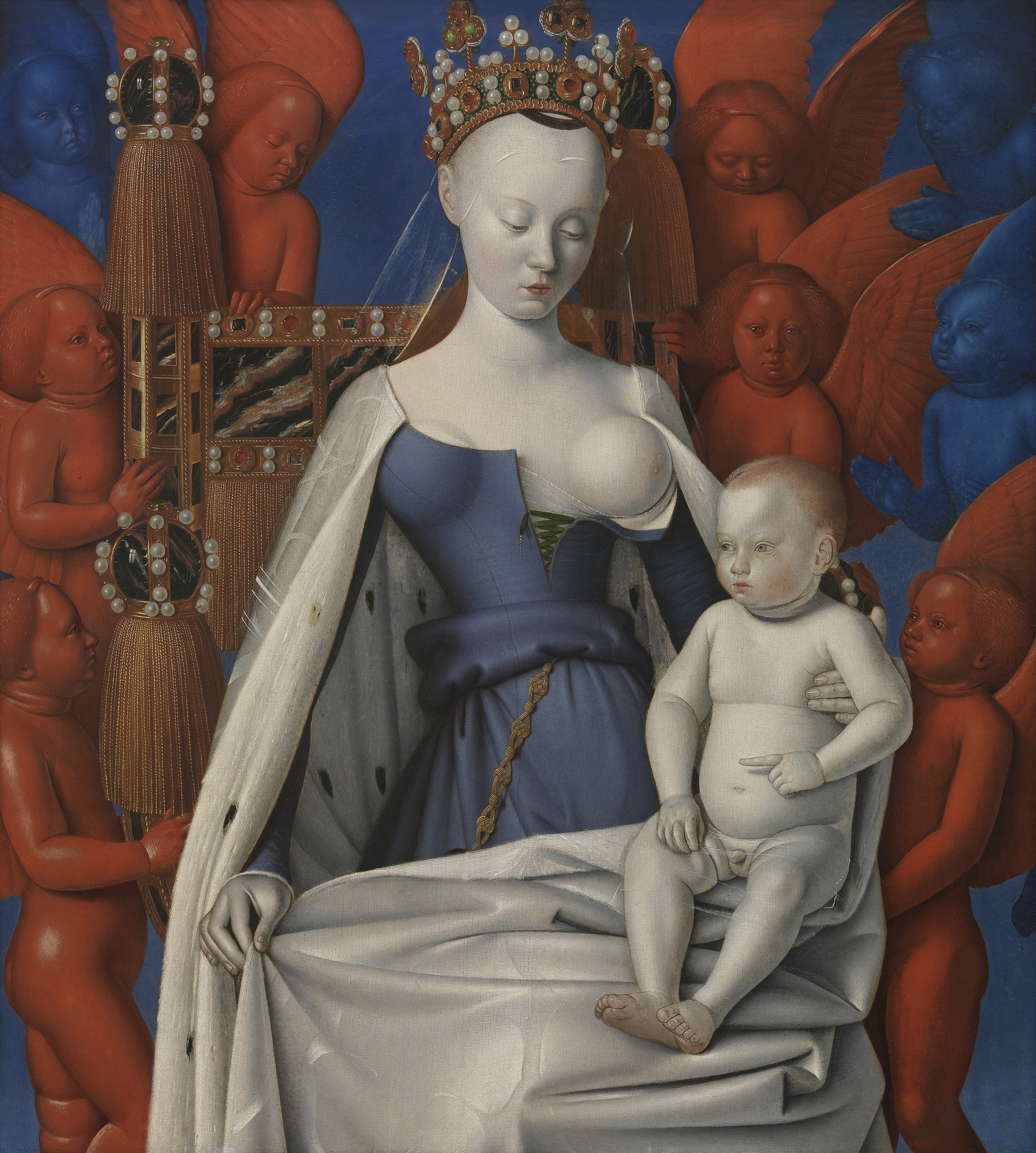
Agnès Sorel, known to appear topless in the French court, was the model for Virgin and Child Surrounded by Angels, by Jean Fouquet (c. 1450).

=== Public breast-baring fashions ===
In many European societies between the Renaissance and the 19th century, exposed breasts were acceptable while a woman's bared legs, ankles or shoulders were considered risqué. During the Renaissance, many artists were strongly influenced by classical Greek styles and culture, and images of nude and semi-nude subjects in many forms proliferated in art, sculpture and architecture of the period. In aristocratic and upper-class circles the display of breasts also invoked associations with classical Greek nude sculptures and art and a classic breast shape was at times regarded as a status symbol, as a sign of beauty, wealth or social position. To maintain youthful-looking bosoms women could employ wet nurses to breastfeed their children.

Breast-baring female fashions have been traced to 15th-century courtesan Agnès Sorel, mistress to Charles VII of France, whose gowns in the French court sometimes exposed one or both of her breasts. (Jean Fouquet's portrayal of the Virgin Mary with her left breast uncovered is believed to have taken Sorel as a model.) Aristocratic women sought to immortalise their breasts in paint, as in the case of Simonetta Vespucci, whose portrait with exposed breasts was painted by Piero di Cosimo in c. 1480. During the 16th century, women's fashions displaying their breasts were common in society, from Queens to common prostitutes, and emulated by all classes.

Similar fashions became popular in England during the 17th century when they were worn by Queen Mary II and by Henrietta Maria, wife of Charles I of England, for whom architect Inigo Jones designed a masque costume that fully revealed both of her breasts.

In a survey of 190 different societies, researches found that very few associated exposed breasts with sexuality, but that there was an insistence that women conceal their breasts. Different standards apply to art, with one example being the dome of the United States Capitol featuring an 1865 fresco depicting goddesses with their breasts exposed.

=== Social attitudes ===
Although some social attitudes to increased body exposure began to soften during the late 1960s, contemporary Western societies still generally view toplessness unfavorably. During a short period in 1964, "topless" dress designs appeared at fashion shows, but those who wore the dresses in public found themselves arrested on indecency charges. However, toplessness has come to be a feature in contemporary haute couture fashion shows.

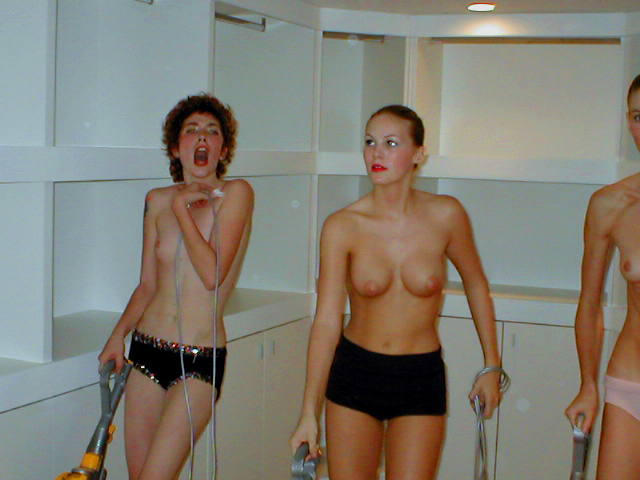
The Imitation of Christ fashion line incorporated toplessness in its 2002 fashion show, which brought comparisons to Vanessa Beecroft's art.

A wide-ranging review of 190 different societies during 1951 found that few insisted that women conceal their breasts. In Europe, topless swimming and sunbathing on public beaches has become socially acceptable. In 1994–95, Australian researchers asked 118 college-age students to rate the behavior of women who go topless on an 8-point scale, ranging from "Women should have the same right to go topless as men" to "Topless women are exhibitionists". They found that 88% of Australian university students of either gender considered it acceptable for women to go topless on public beaches, although they felt that women exposing their breasts in other contexts, such as public parks, was inappropriate. They did not find a correlation between exposed breasts and sexuality in social situations.

A more recent study of 116 college-age women in Australia found that those who had gone topless were more accepting of toplessness generally, more sexual, and had higher self-esteem and higher body image. In contemporary society, the extent to which a woman may expose her breasts depends on social and cultural context. Women's swimsuits and bikinis commonly reveal the tops and sides of the breasts. Displaying cleavage is considered permissible in many settings, and is even a sign of elegance and sophistication on many formal social occasions, but it may be prohibited by dress codes in settings such as workplaces and schools, where sexualized displays of the female breast may be considered inappropriate. In a number of cultures, including Europe and other Westernized countries outside the United States, there are fewer social restrictions against sunbathing or swimming topless. Despite being illegal or socially proscribed in many places in the United States, topless beaches have majority legislative support in some areas.

In Canada, a poll in 1992 found that 38% favored general female public toplessness. Following that survey, several legal rulings in Canadian courts from 1996 to 2000 made public toplessness legal, but very few women go topless in public.

Some cultures have even begun to expand social prohibitions on female toplessness to prepubescent and even infant girls. This trend toward covering the female nipple from infancy onward is particularly noticeable in the United States, Eastern Asia and the Middle East, but is much less common in Europe.

== In politics and law ==
Political attitudes and laws vary greatly around the world in regards to female toplessness.

=== Asia ===
==== Taiwan ====
In support of Icelandic student Adda Smáradóttir's #FreeTheNipple act in public cyberspace, young women uploaded their topless photos to Facebook and protested against its Community Standards of considering women's breasts as sexual materials. Those photos and related news articles were blocked initially, but Facebook considered those photos did not violate Community Standards.

=== Europe ===
==== Denmark ====
Bathing and sunbathing in the nude (including topless) is legal on Danish beaches. Nudity and toplessness in other public outdoor places is generally also legal, unless it involves "offensive conduct" or is likely to cause public outrage. The public outrage law is rarely used in practice, but in 1972 audience members were convicted of being nude in the Royal Danish Theatre. In December 2007, a group of women and men calling themselves Topless Front swam topless in public swim baths to promote topless equality. In March 2008, after a campaign by the group, Copenhagen's Culture and Leisure Committee voted to allow topless bathing in its swimming pools. After the committee had voted, it was revealed that no laws had existed against topless bathing, effectively making the vote unnecessary. However, some public baths had (and have) restricted it themselves. Public breastfeeding is supported by the vast majority of both sexes in Denmark, is entirely legal and accepted in almost all places, except for a few private cafés and restaurants that have restricted it.

==== Finland ====
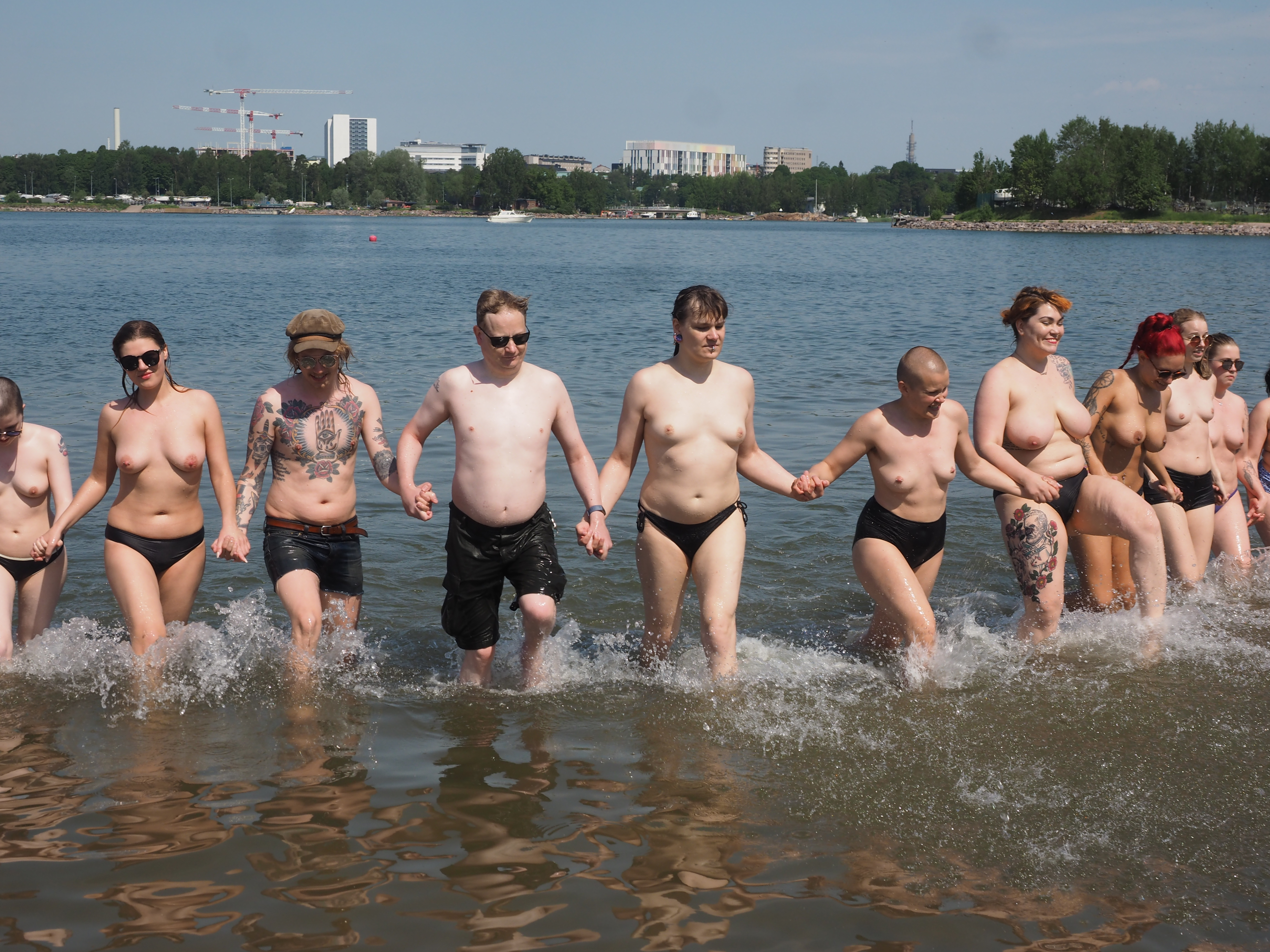
Tissiflashmob in 2019

In Finland, toplessness is not illegal, yet topless women have been removed from beaches. Sandra Marins and Säde Vallarén criticized this and organized Finland's first event demanding topless equality, called Tissiflashmob (breast flashmob). On Finland's Independence day, 6 December 2019, both Marins and Vallarén showed their breasts on live TV and it sparked a lot of conversation. Tissiflashmob 2020 was bigger than the previous one, now organized at the same time in eight different cities.

==== France ====
In France, the feminist collective Les TumulTueuses organized a topfree protest in Paris in May 2009. It is legal to sunbathe topless in France, although local regulations may ban the practice with directives about clothing. In 2020, after a police incident, topless sunbathing was defended by the French interior minister Gérald Darmanin.

==== Germany ====
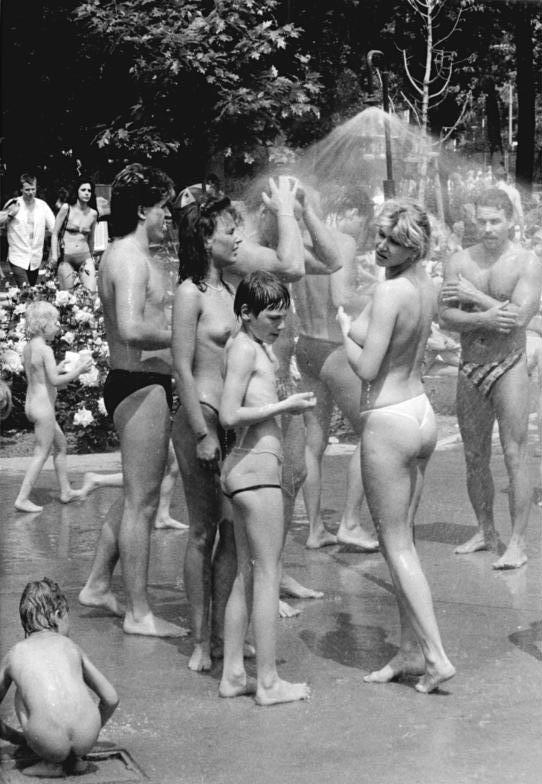
People showering outdoors in East Berlin (1987)

Topless protest in Berlin, Mauerpark, Amphitheater: "We are coming out, Free the nipple gender equality bike ride on 4 July 2026. Speech about double standards (english)

There are few legal restriction on public nudity in Germany. A number of court cases have established a de facto right to nudity in the vicinity of beaches, which is broadly tolerated.

Swimming pools, whether private or public, can establish their own dress regulations. In 2022, a woman in Berlin was told to cover up her chest at a public swimming pool, and was forced to leave when she refused to do so. This led to a successful legal complaint on the basis of gender discrimination, as the men at the pool were not similarly obligated to cover their chests. In March 2023, the city's pool authorities updated their regulations to permit all guests to be topless, regardless of gender. Several other German cities, such as Dresden, Göttingen, and Hannover, have also issued rules explicitly recognizing that persons of all genders have a right to be topless at public swimming pools.

Nudity in nature is a legal gray area, as it is not specifically forbidden, but can be treated as a public nuisance in the event of a complaint. Security services and law enforcement agencies may ask women to cover their breasts, usually under § 118 of the Ordnungswidrigkeitengesetz, which forbids vaguely defined "nuisances to public order". For parks and swimming areas owned or operated by a municipality or private company, the house regulations apply. These house regulations commonly specify that women, but not men, must cover their chests, and are increasingly seen as discriminatory.

Courts have protected the right to nudity at home and on one's own property, even if visible to others. Nudity on one's own property can only be restricted in very exceptional circumstances, usually limited to cases involving "moral or sexual harassment".

==== Greece ====
In Greece, toplessness is legal.

==== Iceland ====
In Iceland, toplessness is legal in public.

==== Italy ====
Female toplessness has been officially legalized (in a nonsexual context) in all public beaches and swimming pools throughout the country (unless otherwise specified by region, province or municipality by-laws) on 20 March 2000, when the Supreme Court of Cassation (through sentence No. 3557) determined that the exposure of the nude female breast, after several decades, is now considered a "commonly accepted behavior", and therefore, has "entered into the social costume".

==== Poland ====
In Poland in 2008–2009, two women from Szczecin including glamour model Dorota Krzysztofek, won a court battle that reasserted the women's right to sunbathe topless on public beaches. Krzysztofek, along with her female companion, were fined by local municipal officials for topless sunbathing at a public recreation area. The women refused to pay the fine and took the matter to Civil Court. Their first hearing had to be postponed due to remarkable media interest.

On November 7, 2008, judge Szczepańska upheld the city staff decision, and charged the women with indecent exposure, explaining that their personal freedoms cannot encroach on the freedoms of families with children who frequent the same recreation spot. Although topless sunbathing is not prohibited in Poland, the judge sentenced them to pay a fine of 230 zlotys (150 zlotys by different source, or €40, $55) for breaking the rules of conduct. In her rationale, the judge also said that it is not up to the defendants to teach youngsters human anatomy; however, her decision was appealed by Krzysztofek's female friend soon afterwards, with the plea of not guilty.

In 2009, the appellate court declared both women to be innocent, because the city staff were unable to prove that anyone at the beach was indignant or scandalized by their toplessness, and no complaint was ever reported. On the contrary, some visitors stood up to their defense. There were no signs at the recreation area against what is otherwise legal. The appellate court's decision was binding, but it also created an aura of ambivalence, with topless sunbathing in public declared acceptable only if nobody else including families with children formally objects to it.

==== Romania ====
In Romania, women are allowed to appear topless in public as long as it does not have sexual connotations.

==== Spain ====
There are no laws in Spain that officially prohibit public nudity (in a non-sexual context), and because of this, both topless sunbathing and naturism (the latter on a smaller scale) are frequently practiced without any issues in all beaches throughout the country, while the amount of partakers may vary depending on the location and the day. It is very common in the Balearic Islands, Canaries, Costa Brava and Costa del Sol (a few municipalities, such as Barcelona, have created by-laws to forbid public nudity, including female toplessness on their streets, not on the beach). Due to the widespread practice of topless sunbathing, the municipalities of Galdakao and L'Ametlla del Vallès decided to legalize female toplessness on their public pools (in March 2016 and June 2018, respectively), and it is tolerated in many others, like in Madrid (without the need of a specific rule). It is less common on private or condominium pools, and a few have by-laws to ban it. Moreover, there are some surveys indicating that more than 40% of the Spanish women who were interviewed (aged 18 or older) reported to have been topless on a beach at least once.

==== Sweden ====
In Sweden, toplessness is not illegal. It is a little unclear, because the law usually used against nudity is about "annoying behaviour" – it does not say anything about how undressed one can be, so it is a matter of legal tradition, although there is a law against gender discrimination. However, private or public establishments are permitted to establish dress codes which may require women to wear tops, and deny access to or remove individuals who breach these standards. In September 2007, "Bara Bröst" (a pun meaning both "Just Breasts" and "Bare Breasts") appeared to promote topless equality in these semi-public facilities. The group staged several events in public swim baths in September and October 2007, starting in Uppsala from which they were evicted several times, before succeeding in Sundsvall.

The group scored a victory in June 2009 when the Malmö city's sports and recreation committee approved new rules that, while requiring everybody to wear bathing suits at indoor public swimming pools, did not require women to cover their breasts. "We don't define what bathing suits men should wear so it doesn't make much sense to do it for women. And besides, it's not unusual for men to have large breasts that resemble women's breasts", said a council spokesman.

=== North America ===
==== Canada ====
In 1991 toplessness as an indecent act was challenged by Gwen Jacob in Guelph, Ontario, who removed her shirt and was charged with indecency. Part of her defense was the double standards between men and women. Although she was convicted, this was overturned by the Court of Appeal. This case determined that being topless is not indecent under the meaning of the Criminal Code. However it did not establish any constitutional right of equality. This case subsequently led to the acquittal of women in British Columbia and Saskatchewan who faced similar charges. Although each province and territory technically reserves its right to interpret the law as it pleases, the Ontario case has proven influential. Since the matter has not been determined by the Supreme Court of Canada, it is still possible that a woman could be convicted elsewhere in Canada, but interpretation of moral law in Canada has become increasingly liberalized. There do not appear to have been any further women charged in Canada since these cases were determined.

In February 2023, the cities of Edmonton and Calgary, both in the province of Alberta, changed their policies so that wearing bathing suit tops in city-operated pools was an individual's choice.

==== Mexico ====
The only public place in Mexico that officially allows female toplessness is Playa Zipolite (a nude beach located in the state of Oaxaca), where the practice of naturism was legalized in 2016. However, the practice of topless sunbathing (as well as naturism in some cases) is commonly tolerated on a few beaches in the state of Quintana Roo, more precisely in the Riviera Maya region (especially between the cities of Playa del Carmen and Tulum); furthermore, there are a few clothing-optional resorts made for adults only (also located in the Riviera Maya) where all men and women aged 18 (or older) can frequent the facilities without the need to wear clothes (if so they wish).

==== United States ====
Female toplessness laws in the United States by state and territory Legal Illegal Vague/unknown Questionable legality

In the United States, states have primary jurisdiction in matters of public morality. The topfreedom movement has claimed success in a few instances in persuading some state and federal courts to overturn some state laws on the basis of sex discrimination or equal protection, arguing that a woman should be free to expose her chest in any context in which a man can expose his. Other successful cases have been on the basis of freedom of expression in protest, or simply that exposure of breasts is not indecent (or similar terminology).

Laws and ordinances barring female toplessness are being challenged in federal courts around the nation. Each lawsuit, if it prevails at the appellate level, will legalize topfreedom in the following U.S. circuit courts of appeals (from west to east): 9 (California), 8 (Missouri) and 1 (Maryland). A federal lawsuit in the 7th Circuit (Illinois), was lost at the appellate level and the petition for review by the U.S. Supreme Court was denied. A preliminary injunction in a federal lawsuit in the 10th Circuit (Colorado), was won at the appellate level. In September 2019, after spending over $300,000, Fort Collins decided to stop defending their ordinance and repeal it. That effectively gave females of all ages the right to go topless wherever males can in the jurisdiction of the 10th Circuit (Wyoming, Utah, Colorado, New Mexico, Kansas and Oklahoma states as well as all counties and cities therein).

=== Oceania ===
==== Australia ====
In Australia, indecent exposure laws only refer to the genital area, so technically both male and female toplessness is legal. However, many local councils impose their own rules, and have the power to ask topless people to leave an area. Additionally, women who go topless are sometimes slapped with more vague charges such as being a public nuisance, or offensive behaviour.

On public beaches, local bylaws are not heavily enforced, and women can often sunbathe topless without legal repercussions.

Breastfeeding in public places is a legal right in Australia. Under the Sex Discrimination Act 1984, no business or service provider can discriminate against a breastfeeding woman. Women can still breastfeed even if no other food/drink is allowed in the area. If a special baby care room is available for breastfeeding, women are not required to use it unless they wish to. If someone abuses a breastfeeding woman or forces her to leave, this may come under state/territory harassment laws. These protections also include women who are expressing breast milk for their baby.

==== New Zealand ====
In New Zealand, there is no specific law prohibiting nudity in public places. If a person is nude and also exhibiting lewd and lascivious, or obscene behaviour, then they may fall afoul of laws.

The High Court of New Zealand has upheld a conviction of disorderly conduct for nudity in the street, because it was not a place where nudity was known to occur or commonplace. Being nude in the street is likely to incur a small fine if a complaint is made against the person, or if the person ignores a police order to cover themselves. However, in practice, the likelihood of being prosecuted for nudity on a public beach is low, provided the person keeps to themselves.

In 2012, a woman swam topless on Ōpunake beach. The police were called, but informed the callers that toplessness was not an offence.

In 2017, nudists used the beach at Tauranga, which caused consternation among some residents. However, the local council said there were no bylaws dealing with the issue, and that nudity was not an offence.

=== South America ===
==== Argentina ====
Female toplessness is allowed in the official nude beaches of Puerto Escondido, located near Miramar, and Playa Querandí, located in Villa Gesell, as well as in some private naturist resorts.

On 7 February 2017, hundreds of topless women protested in Buenos Aires, Córdoba, Mar del Plata and Rosario, among other cities throughout the country. The protest was called in Spanish tetazo (a portmanteau of the Spanish word tetas, meaning "tits", and the Spanish suffix "-azo", which denotes a hitting action). The protestors objected against the "objectification" of the female body, and also disapproved the decision made by 20 police officers, who days before, had expelled from a beach located in Necochea 3 women who were topless sunbathing there.

==== Brazil ====
The Article 233 of the Chapter VI of the Title VI of the Penal Code asserts that indecent exposure (known in Portuguese as ato obsceno, meaning "obscene act") is a wrongdoing act punished with imprisonment or fine, but does not specify what are the nude parts of the human body which could be fitted on this misdemeanor. Despite this vagueness, female toplessness tends to be considered an "obscene act" by the Brazilian authorities, and the practice has been frequently repressed, including some arrests made by the police throughout the years.

Generally, the practice of topless sunbathing by women has been accepted only in official nude beaches and in some private naturist clubs. However, for many years, there has been one notable exception: the Carnival in Rio de Janeiro. During the famous two-night parades yearly held by 12 samba schools (6 on each day) at the Sambadrome Marquês de Sapucaí, the official policy is that only the genital area cannot be publicly shown (in this case all nude men and women must wear a merkin, which is known in Portuguese as tapa-sexo, roughly translated as "sex cover"). Thus, both men and women can openly expose their bare breasts and buttocks to the public during the marches without any problem.

Since the early 2010s, there are reports of some small and sporadic protests, especially in some beaches located in Rio de Janeiro. These protests are called in Portuguese toplessaços (a portmanteau of the English word "toplessness" and the Portuguese suffix "-aço", translated from the Spanish "-azo", which denotes a hitting action). In each protest, a group of women, soon after being reunited, decide to quickly take off all clothes they were wearing above the waist (including bras, bikinis or any other tops), culminating in a state of public "breast-flashing" for a few minutes before putting on their clothes again. This way, these are considered a kind of topless flash mob protests. The purpose of these protests is to claim for the official legalization of female toplessness in Brazil under the principle of gender equality.

In 2013, activist Roberta da Silva Pereira participated in the SlutWalk in Guarulhos while topless. Police instructed her to cover her breasts; she refused, prompting other activists to gather in protest. Pereira was taken to a police station and charged with an "obscene act." Initially, the Public Prosecutor's Office offered her a plea bargain which would have required her to pay 300 reais. She rejected the offer, and the prosecution subsequently filed formal criminal charges. In July 2016, Pereira was sentenced to three months in prison, with the sentence commuted to a payment of 1,000 reais. She appealed, but the Appeals Panel of Guarulhos upheld the conviction by a 3–1 vote. Her defense team and human rights organizations appealed to the Supreme Federal Court, which is reviewing the case as of 4 November 2026.

In 2022, Congressman Paulo Ramos (PDT) introduced a bill aiming to legalize toplessness in the country. The bill is still pending as of 2026.

==== Chile ====
Exposing the breasts in public is not a crime, although it is an offense applicable according to the Article 373 of the Penal Code to those who "in any way offend modesty or good customs". Similarly, the Article 495 says: "Shall be punished with a fine of one monthly tax unit (first paragraph) whoever contravenes the rules that the authority dictates to preserve public order or prevent it from being altered, unless the act constitutes a crime or simple offense".

Faced with so much inconvenience, a group of women together with the photographer and pioneer of naturism in Chile, René Rojas, managed to create the first nude beach in the country in 2000, called Playa Luna, as well as the unofficial restricted areas that were created in Playa Luna Norte (Tarapacá), Playa Luna Sur (Coliumo), Playa Escondida (Antofagasta), Playa Blanca (Tongoy) and Pichilemu, where it is possible to completely undress with total normality.

==== Uruguay ====
The practice of female toplessness is allowed in the official nude beaches of Chihuahua, located in the resort of the same name, and La Sirena, located in the resort of Aguas Dulces.

=== As a form of liberation ===
While an exposed breast in public can have many associated connotations, some women in America today argue the exposed breast is a symbol of liberation. They speak against the proposed notion that their rightful place was below their male counterparts. Throughout the late 20th century, more and more women began to link the struggle for female equality and the repossession of the female body. This can be especially seen in the work of Second Wave Feminists beginning in the early 1960s.

The reaction to exposed breasts as a symbol of liberation was two-sided. Women who took part in the movement expressed their desire to turn attention away from the excessive eroticization of the female body in American popular culture to more essential societal needs. Opposition to the braless movement ironically viewed it as an attack to American morals and public decency. The bralessness movement evolved into a bare-breasted movement, which became another way for women to "thumb one's nose at society". While some women exposed their breasts individually, there was also an upsurge in topless demonstrations used to draw public attention to women's issues such as pornography and sexism. The sexualization of the breast is found only in a few Western nations, and this, many women argue, causes women to turn to plastic surgery and view their breasts as determinants of beauty rather than potentially nourishing life forces. Because of this, women are able to liberate their breasts as a way to gain attention, make political statements, and combat breast exposure laws' reinforcement of the supposed uncontrollable seductive nature of women's breasts.

=== As a form of protest ===
In Western countries, toplessness in public often generates media coverage, leading some female political demonstrators to deliberately expose their breasts in public to draw media and public attention to their cause. For example, in January 2012, three members of the Ukrainian protest group FEMEN attracted worldwide media attention after they staged a topless protest at the World Economic Forum in Davos, Switzerland.

== In religion ==
In European pre-historic societies, sculptures of female figures with pronounced or highly exaggerated breasts were common. A typical example is the so-called Venus of Willendorf, one of many Venus figurines from the Paleolithic era with ample hips and bosom. Artifacts such as bowls, rock carvings and sacred statues with breasts have been recorded from 15,000 BC up to late antiquity all across Europe, North Africa and the Middle East. Many female deities representing love and fertility were associated with breasts and breast milk. Figures of the Phoenician goddess Astarte were represented as pillars studded with breasts. Isis, an Egyptian goddess who represented, among many other things, ideal motherhood, was often portrayed as suckling pharaohs, thereby confirming their divine status as rulers. Even certain male deities representing regeneration and fertility were occasionally depicted with breast-like appendices, such as the river god Hapy who was considered to be responsible for the annual overflowing of the Nile. Female breasts were also prominent in the Minoan civilization in the form of the famous Snake Goddess statuettes.

In Ancient Greece there were several cults worshiping the "Kourotrophos", the suckling mother, represented by goddesses such as Gaia, Hera and Artemis. The worship of deities symbolized by the female breast in Greece became less common during the first millennium. The popular adoration of female goddesses decreased significantly during the rise of the Greek city states, a legacy which was passed on to the later Roman Empire.

During the middle of the first millennium BC, Greek culture experienced a gradual change in the perception of female breasts. Women in art were covered in clothing from the neck down, including female goddesses like Athena, the patron of Athens who represented heroic endeavor. There were exceptions: Aphrodite, the goddess of love, was more frequently portrayed fully nude, though in postures that were intended to portray shyness or modesty, a portrayal that has been compared to modern pin-ups by historian Marilyn Yalom. Although nude men were depicted standing upright, most depictions of female nudity in Greek art occurred "usually with drapery near at hand and with a forward-bending, self-protecting posture". A popular legend at the time was of the Amazons, a tribe of fierce female warriors who socialized with men only for procreation and even removed one breast to become better warriors. The legend was a popular motif in art during Greek and Roman antiquity and served as an antithetical cautionary tale.

== In popular culture ==
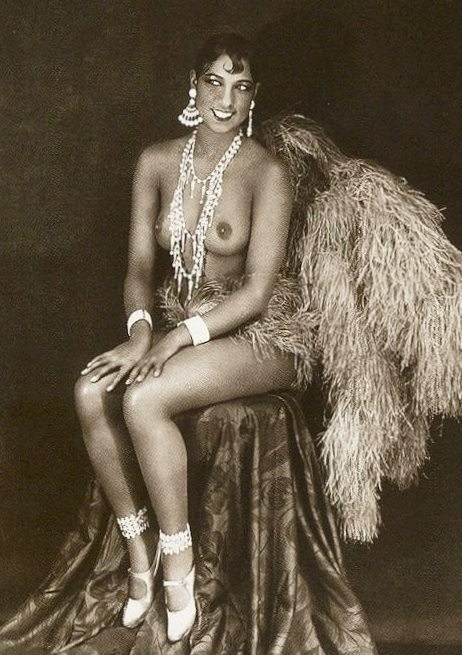
Josephine Baker topless (1927)

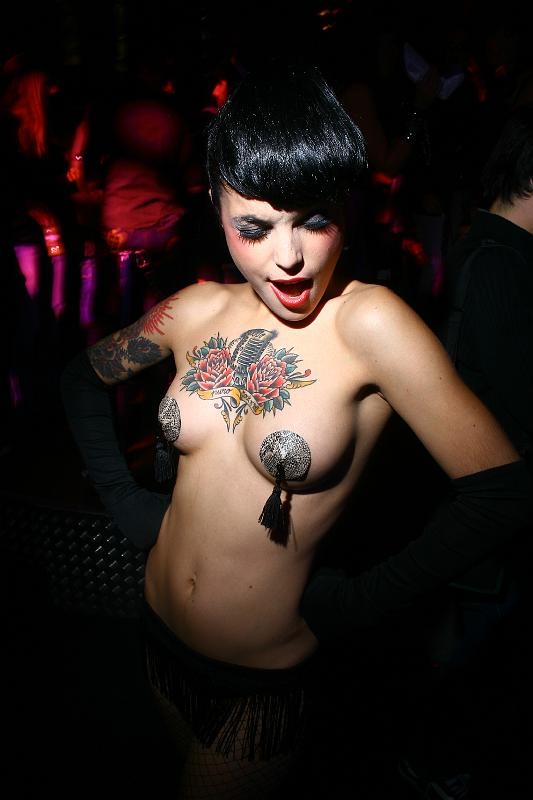
Neo-Burlesque dancer with pasties (2007)

The French have traditionally been relaxed with nudity and toplessness in entertainment, and dancers and actresses performed topless during the 1910s and beyond in musical theater and cinema. Toplessness in entertainment has survived to this day at the Folies Bergère and the Moulin Rouge. Some female groups have also performed topless, such as the two female groups called The Ladybirds (one in San Francisco and another in Copenhagen), which performed topless in the late 1960s.

Women are also at times employed in adult-only venues to perform or pose topless in forms of commercial erotic entertainment. Such venues can range from downmarket strip clubs and topless bars to upmarket cabarets, such as the Moulin Rouge. Topless entertainment may also include competitions such as wet T-shirt contests, especially during spring break in the United States, in which women display their breasts through translucent wet fabric—and may end up removing their T-shirts in front of the audience.

Female toplessness has also become somewhat common during Mardi Gras in New Orleans during which women "flash" (briefly expose) their breasts in return for strings of plastic beads, and at Carnaval in Rio de Janeiro, where floats occasionally feature topless women.

Pasties are sometimes worn by erotic dancers or burlesque entertainers to give the impression of toplessness while avoiding prosecution under local public indecency laws which prohibit exposure of the nipple and areolas. To stay within the law, liquid latex pasties may be used. Pasties may be worn by neo-burlesque performers and are also found in night clubs, fetish parties and parades, such as Pride Parades.

=== Swimsuits ===
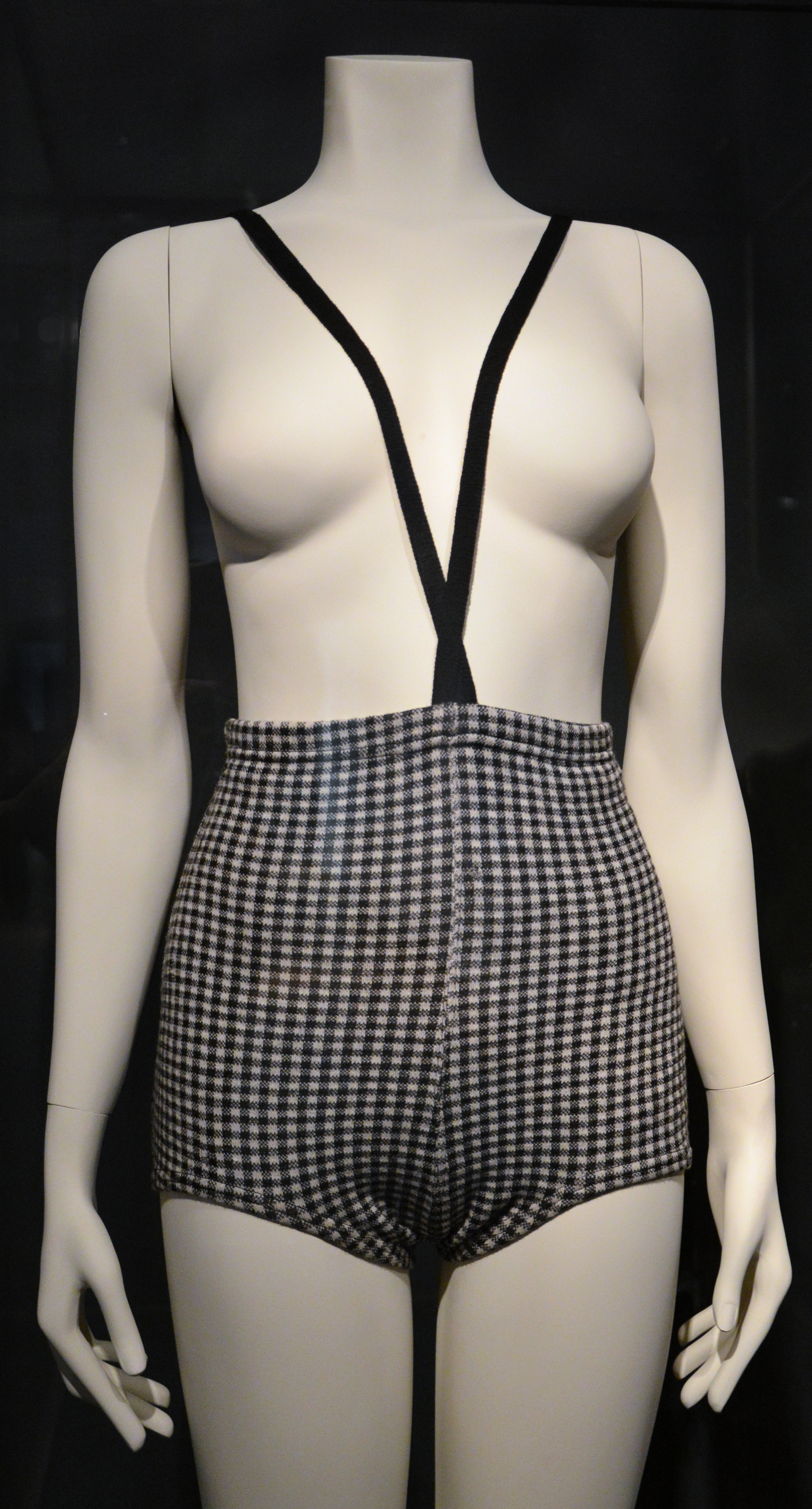
Rudi Gernreich's original monokini design

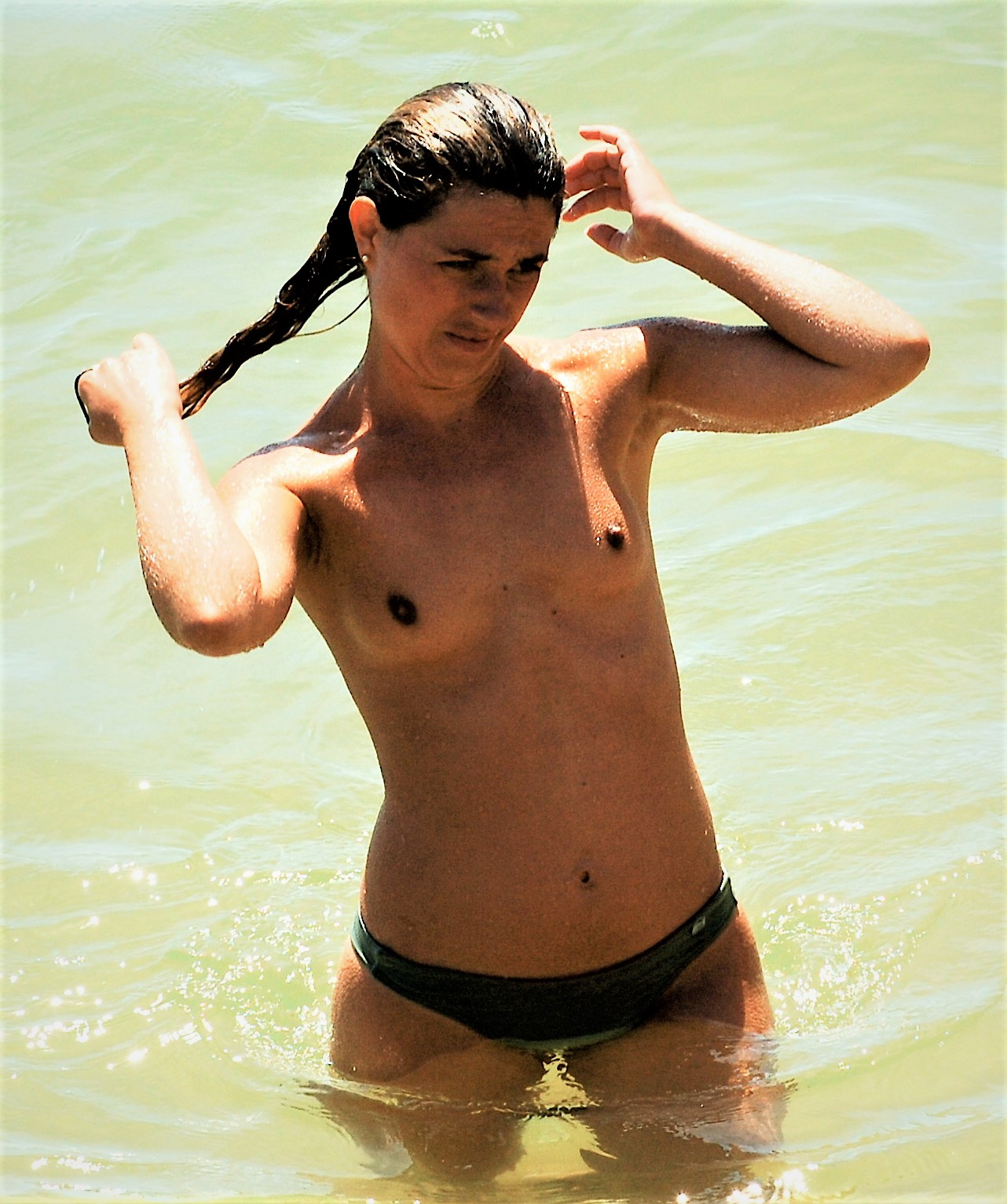
Topless swimmer in Cascais, Portugal

Toplessness in a public place is most commonly practised or encountered near water, either as part of a swimming activity or sunbathing. The introduction of the bikini in 1946 and increasingly common glamour shots of popular actresses and models on either side of the Atlantic wearing the minimal swimsuit design played a large part in bringing the bikini and sunbathing into the mainstream.

In 1964, fashion designer Rudi Gernreich went further and designed and produced a topless swimsuit, which he called the "monokini" in the United States. Gernreich's monokini consisted primarily of a brief, close-fitting bottom that "extended from the midriff to the upper thigh" and was "held up by shoestring laces that make a halter around the neck". It first appeared in print in Look magazine, introducing the concept of a topless swimsuit into commercial fashion. He later said he did not really mean for the swimsuit to be popular as it was, but rather as a fantastical concept and prediction of the future. "[Women] drop their bikini tops already", he said, "so it seemed like the natural next step." A photograph of Peggy Moffitt, the famous model for the suit, appeared in Women's Wear Daily, Life and numerous other publications.

Despite the negative reaction of fashion critics and church officials, shoppers purchased about 3000 of his swimsuit design at $24 each that summer, though the only woman reported as having worn it to a beach in the United States was arrested. The novelty of the design caught significant attention. Life writer Shana Alexander noted in an article about the introduction of the monokini in July 1964, "One funny thing about toplessness is that it really doesn't have much to do with breasts. Breasts of course are not absurd; topless swimsuits are. Lately people keep getting the two things mixed up."

The topless swimsuit failed to catch on in the United States. The Soviet government called it "barbarism" and a sign of social "decay". The New York City Police Department was strictly instructed to arrest any woman wearing a swimsuit by the commissioner of parks. In Chicago, a 19-year-old female beachgoer was fined US$100 for wearing a topless swimsuit on a public beach. Copious coverage of the event helped to send the image of exposed breasts across the world. Women's clubs and the church were particularly active in their condemnation. In Italy and Spain, the Catholic Church warned against the topless fashion. In France in 1964, Roger Frey led the prosecution of the use of the monokini, describing it as "a public offense against the sense of decency, punishable according to article 330 of the penal code. Consequently, the police chiefs must employ the services of the police so that the women who wear this bathing suit in public places are prosecuted." At St. Tropez on the French Riviera, where toplessness later became the norm, the mayor ordered police to ban toplessness and to watch over the beach via helicopter. Jean-Luc Godard, a founding mover of French New Wave cinema, incorporated a shot of a woman in a topless swimsuit on the Riviera into his film A Married Woman, but it was edited out by the censors.

=== Media and photography ===
In many Western cultures today, images of topless women are regularly featured in magazines, calendars, and other print media, often covering their breasts in a "handbra", that is, the use of the woman's hands or arms to cover their breasts, especially the nipples and areolas. In the United Kingdom, following a tradition established by the British newspaper The Sun in 1970, several mainstream tabloid newspapers featured topless female models on their third page, known as Page 3 girls, although this is no longer the case. The subject of glamour photography is often a topless woman.

Photographers such as Jock Sturges and Bill Henson have been prosecuted or been embroiled in controversy for producing images of topless teen girls as part of their ongoing work.

=== Cinema ===
In the 1920s, nudity, including toplessness, was featured in some Hollywood silent films as well as on the stage, though not without objections from various groups, and several jurisdictions in the United States and elsewhere set up film censorship boards to censor films. In the 1930s, the Hays Code brought an end in Hollywood films to nudity in all its forms. To remain within the censors' guidelines or community standards of decency and modesty, breasts of actresses in an otherwise topless scene would be covered, especially the nipples and areolas, with their hands (using a "handbra" stance), arms, towel, pasties, some other object, or the angle of the body in relation to the camera.

Film making in other centres were not subject to the Hays Code, but were subject to various national censorship regimes. The Italian film Era lui... sì! sì! (1951), for example, also had a French version which included topless actresses in the harem scene. This version was especially made for the French market, where censorship was less rigorous than in Italy. Social and official attitudes to toplessness and nudity had eased by the 1960s and the Hays Code came under repeated challenge. For example, in Mutiny on the Bounty (1962) all Tahitian girls were topless and there was a long native dance scene, though the topless female dancers' breasts were covered by leis. The historical epic film Hawaii (1966) also featured scenes of topless native girls, their breasts being strategically covered by leis.

In 1968 the Hays Code was replaced by the MPAA film rating system. Women now appear topless in mainstream cinema, although usually somewhat briefly. Film critic Roger Ebert argued that there was a double standard in relation to the toplessness of "native" women. He wrote that the producers of Rapa-Nui (1994), which featured repeated scenes of bare-breasted native women, got away with ongoing toplessness because of the women's brown skin:

Rapa Nui slips through the National Geographic Loophole. This is the Hollywood convention which teaches us that brown breasts are not as sinful as white ones, and so while it may be evil to gaze upon a blond Playboy centerfold and feel lust in our hearts, it is educational to watch Polynesian maidens frolicking topless in the surf. This isn't sex; it's geography.

Besides those actresses who have appeared nude or partially nude in films, it has also become increasingly common for actresses to appear topless in movies. Notable actresses who have appeared topless include Jane Fonda (Coming Home, 1978), Julie Andrews (S.O.B., 1981), Kate Winslet (Titanic, 1997), Gwyneth Paltrow (Shakespeare in Love, 1998), Reese Witherspoon (Twilight, 1998), Rene Russo (The Thomas Crown Affair, 1999), Katie Holmes (The Gift, 2000), and Halle Berry (Swordfish, 2001). In an interview in March 2007, Halle Berry said that her toplessness in Swordfish was "gratuitous" to the movie, but that she needed to do the scene to get over her fear of nudity, and that it was the best thing she did for her career. Having overcome her inhibitions, she went on to a role in Monster's Ball, which included a nude scene and which won her an Oscar for Best Actress. Some actresses prefer not to expose their breasts and use a body double.

Pasties were and may still be worn by some actresses while filming an otherwise apparently topless or nude scene, which is not caught by the camera angle.

=== Topless dancing ===
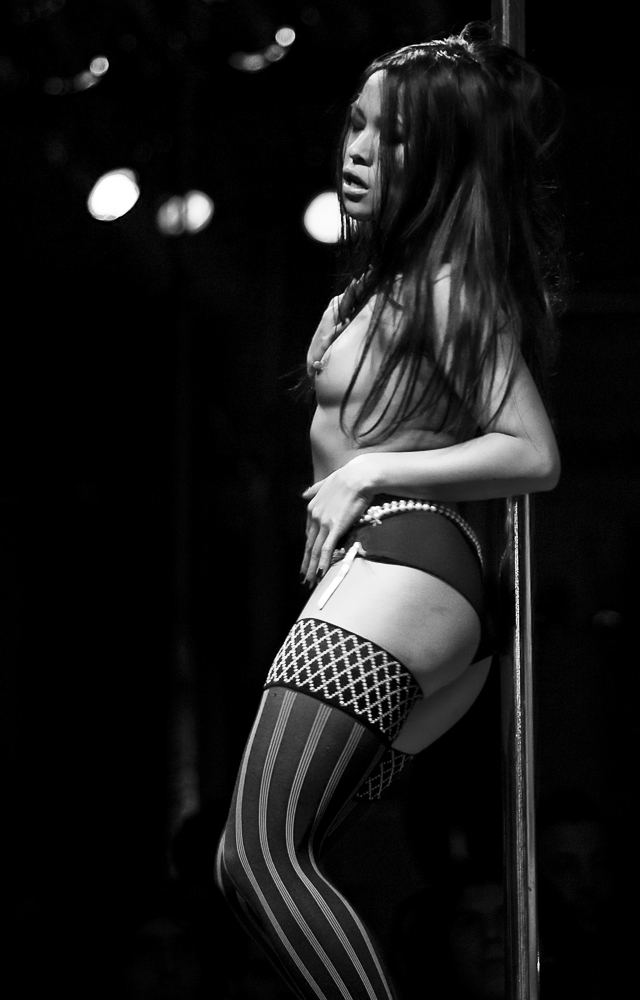
A topless pole dancer in a strip club

On 12 June 1964, the San Francisco Chronicle featured a woman wearing a monokini with her exposed breasts on its first page. Two weeks later on 22 June 1964, Carol Doda started dancing topless wearing a monokini (designed by Rudi Gernreich) at the Condor Club in San Francisco's North Beach district. Her debut as a topless dancer was featured in Playboy magazine in April 1965. Doda was the first modern topless dancer in the United States, renewing the burlesque era of the early 20th century in the U.S. San Francisco Mayor John Shelley said, "topless is at the bottom of porn". Within a few days, women were baring their breasts in many of the clubs lining San Francisco's Broadway St., ushering in the era of the topless bar.

San Francisco public officials tolerated the topless bars until 22 April 1965, when the San Francisco Police Department arrested Doda on indecency charges. Hundreds of protesters gathered outside the police department, calling for release of both Doda and free speech activist Mario Savio, held in the same station. Doda rapidly became a symbol of sexual freedom, while topless restaurants, shoeshine parlors, ice-cream stands and girl bands proliferated in San Francisco and elsewhere. Journalist Earl Wilson wrote in his syndicated column, "Are we ready for girls in topless gowns? Heck, we may not even notice them." English designers created topless evening gowns inspired by the idea. The San Francisco Examiner published a real estate advertisement that promised "bare top swimsuits are possible here".

=== The arts ===
The artifacts in the Ancient Siam open-air museum near Bangkok depict Thai women topless. The Ramakien Mural representing the epic lives of the Thai people found at the Wat Phra Kaew Temple depict women wearing only a skirt in public.

As a result of the Renaissance, in many European societies artists were strongly influenced by classical Greek styles and culture. As a result, images of nude and semi-nude subjects in many forms proliferated in art and sculpture.

During the Victorian era, French Orientalist painters such as Jean-Léon Gérôme presented an idealized depiction of female toplessness in Muslim harem baths, while Eugène Delacroix, a French romantic artist, invoked images of Liberty as a topless woman.

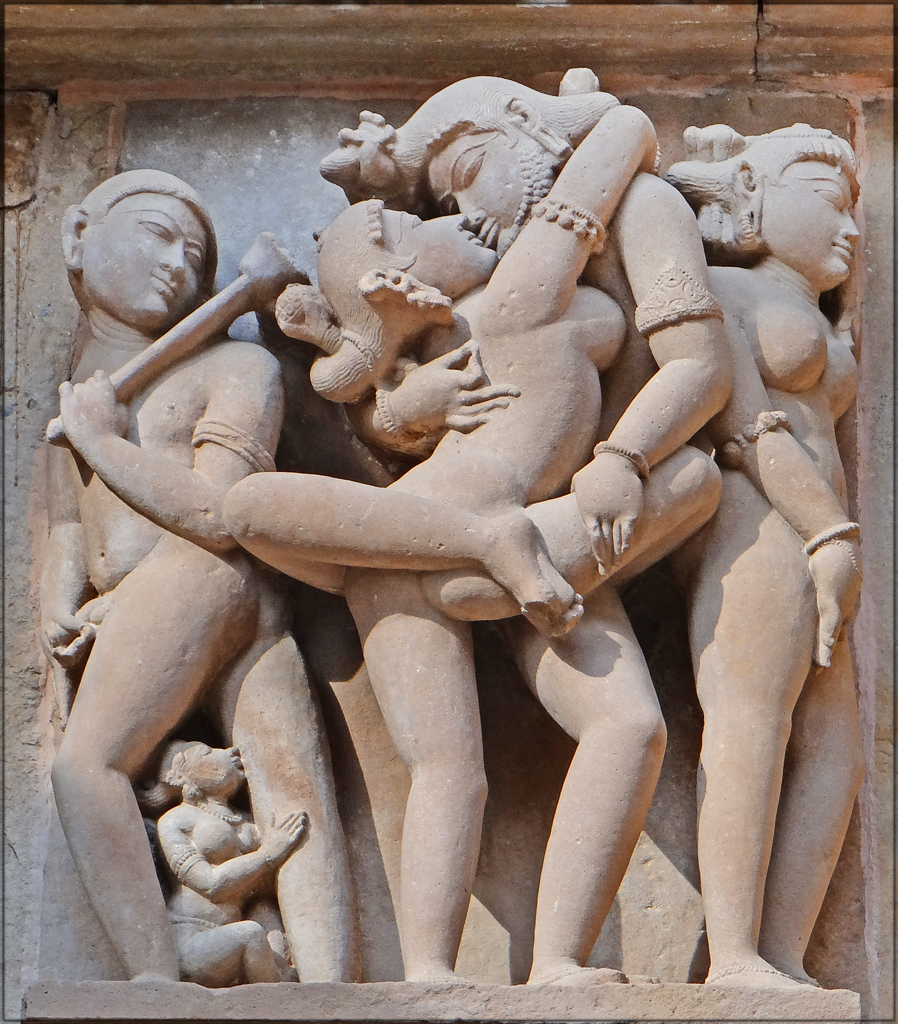
Erotic art of Khajuraho temples in India, dated to the 10th century

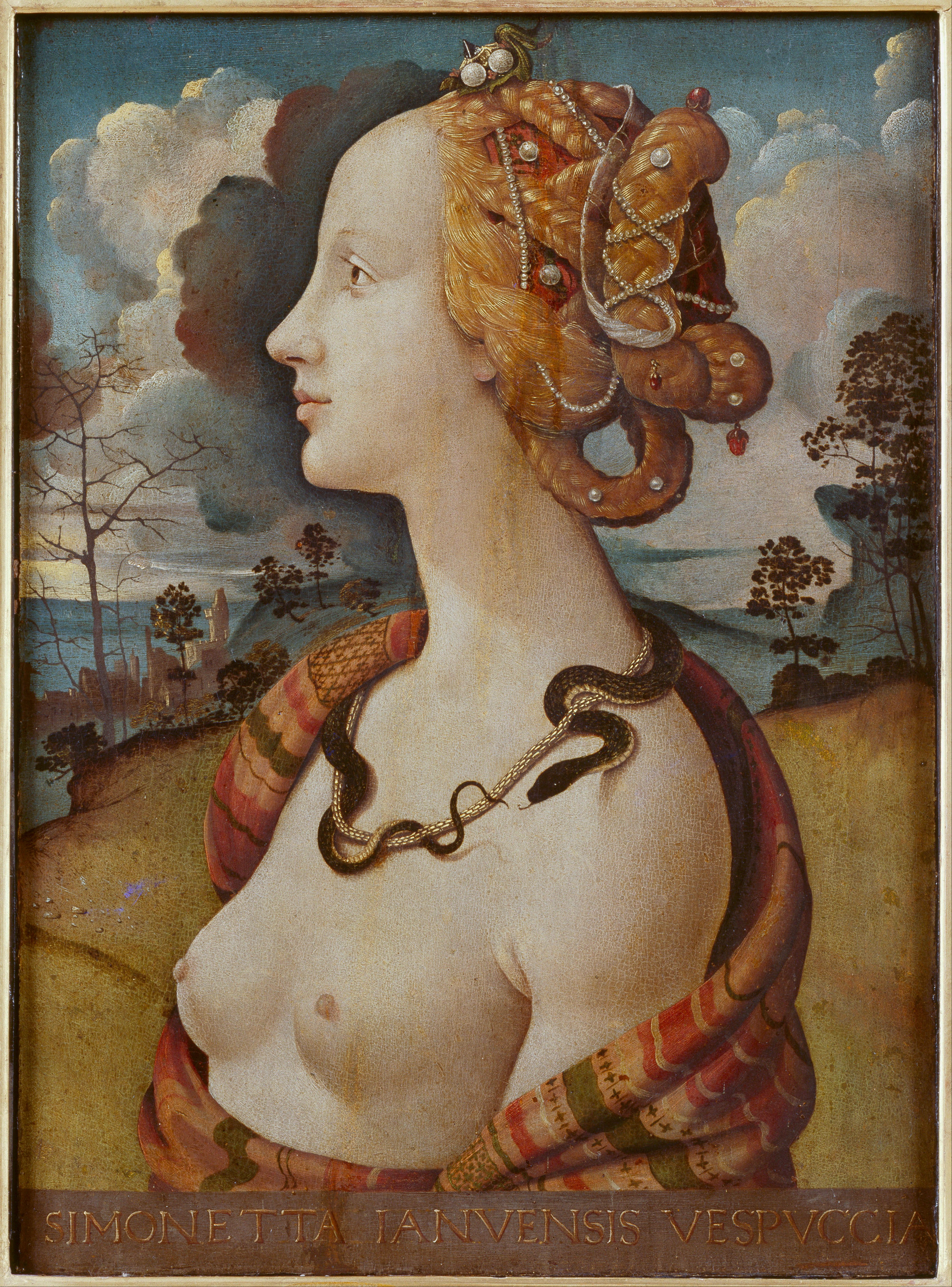
Portrait of Simonetta Vespucci (c. 1480) by Piero di Cosimo

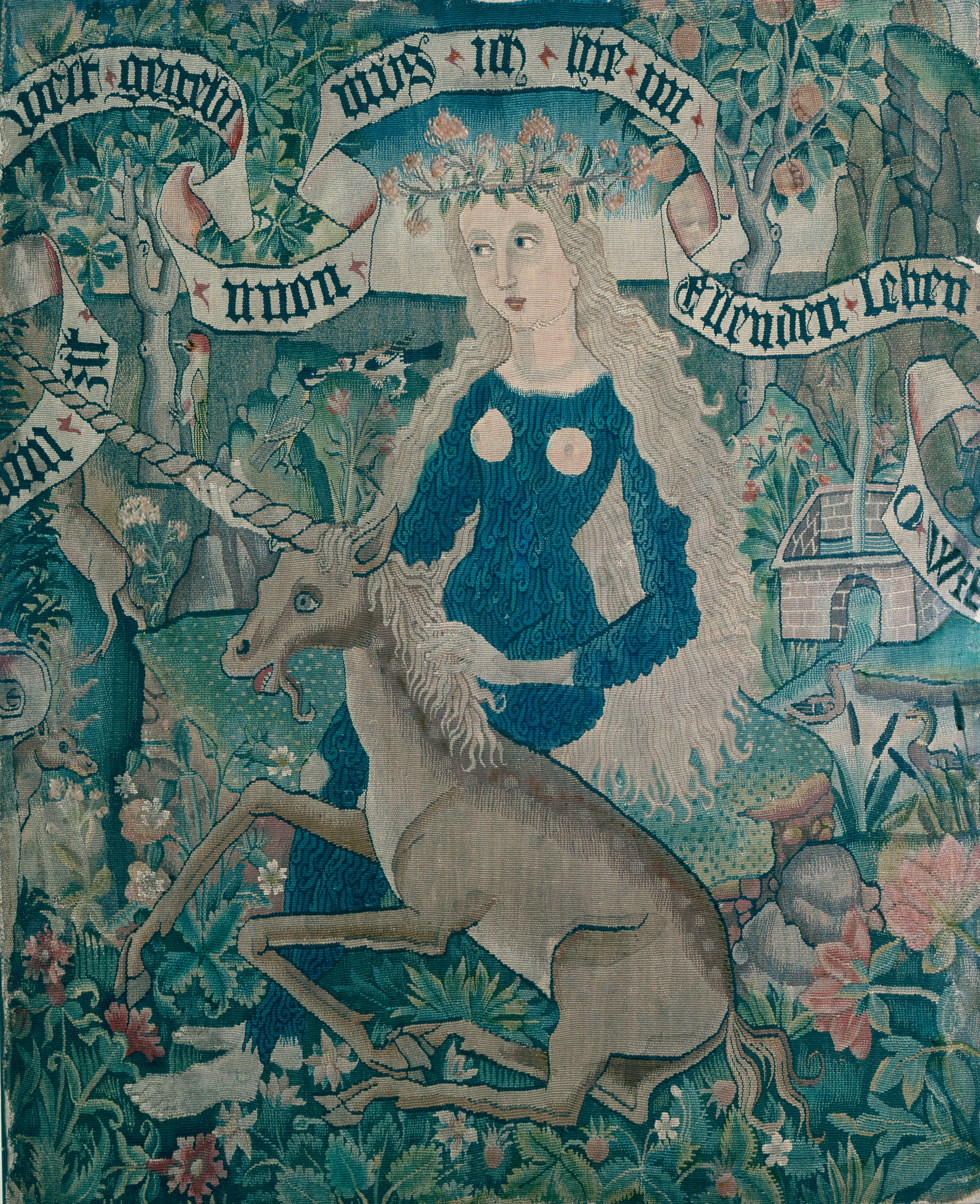
Wild Women with Unicorn (c. 1500–1510)

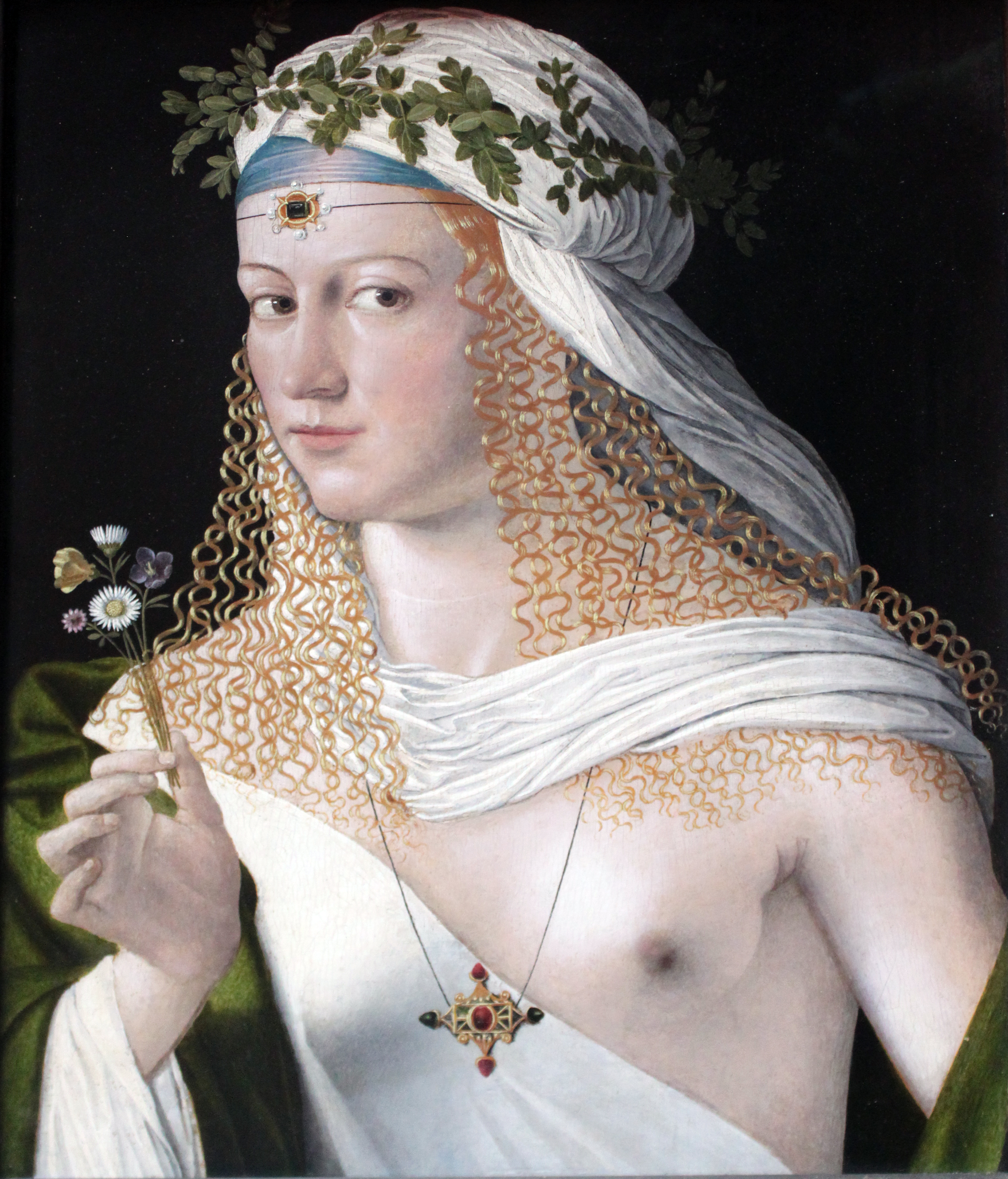
Portrait of a Woman by Bartolomeo Veneto (traditionally assumed to be Lucrezia Borgia)

Liberty Leading the People (1830) by Eugène Delacroix

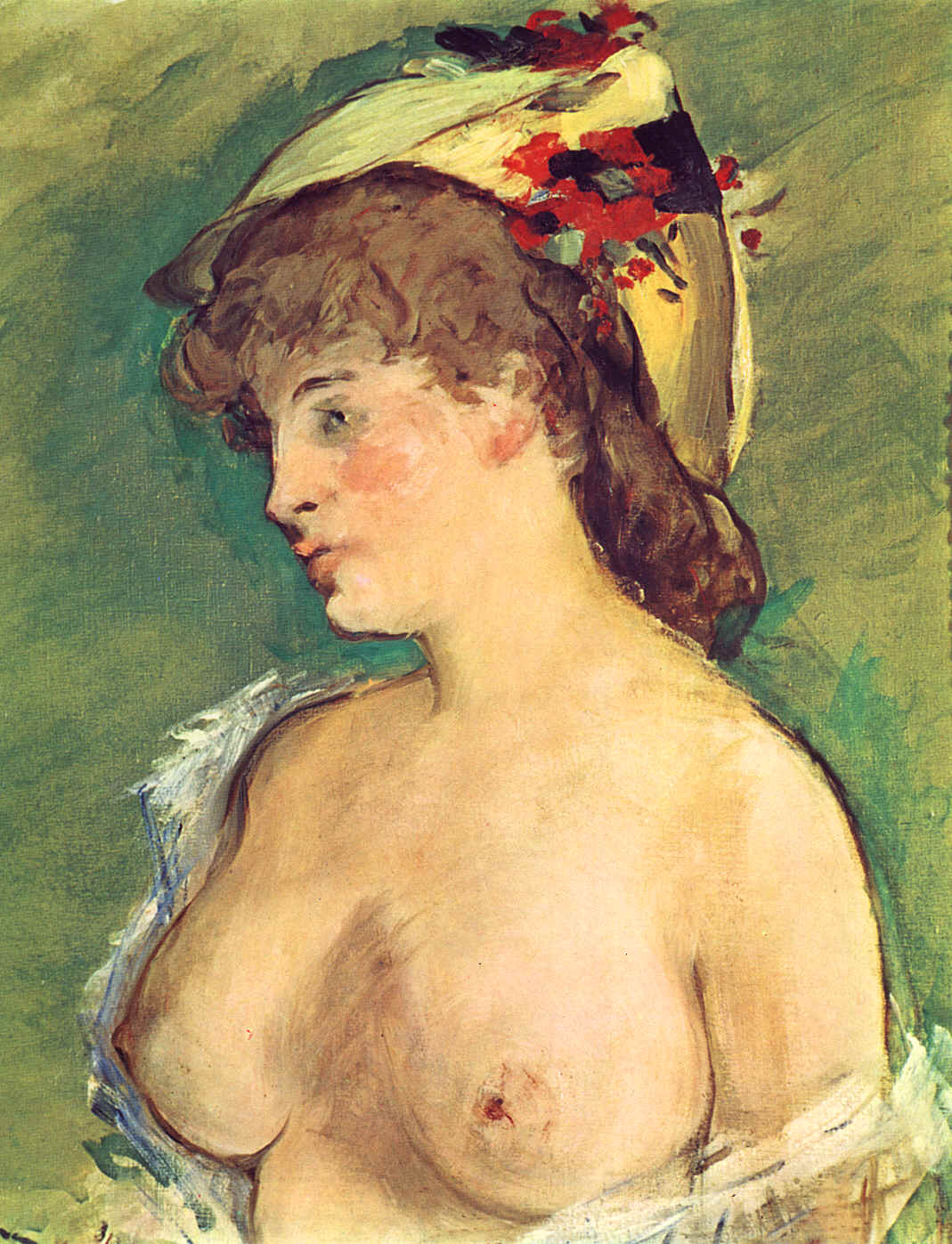
Blonde Woman with Bare Breasts (c. 1878) by Édouard Manet

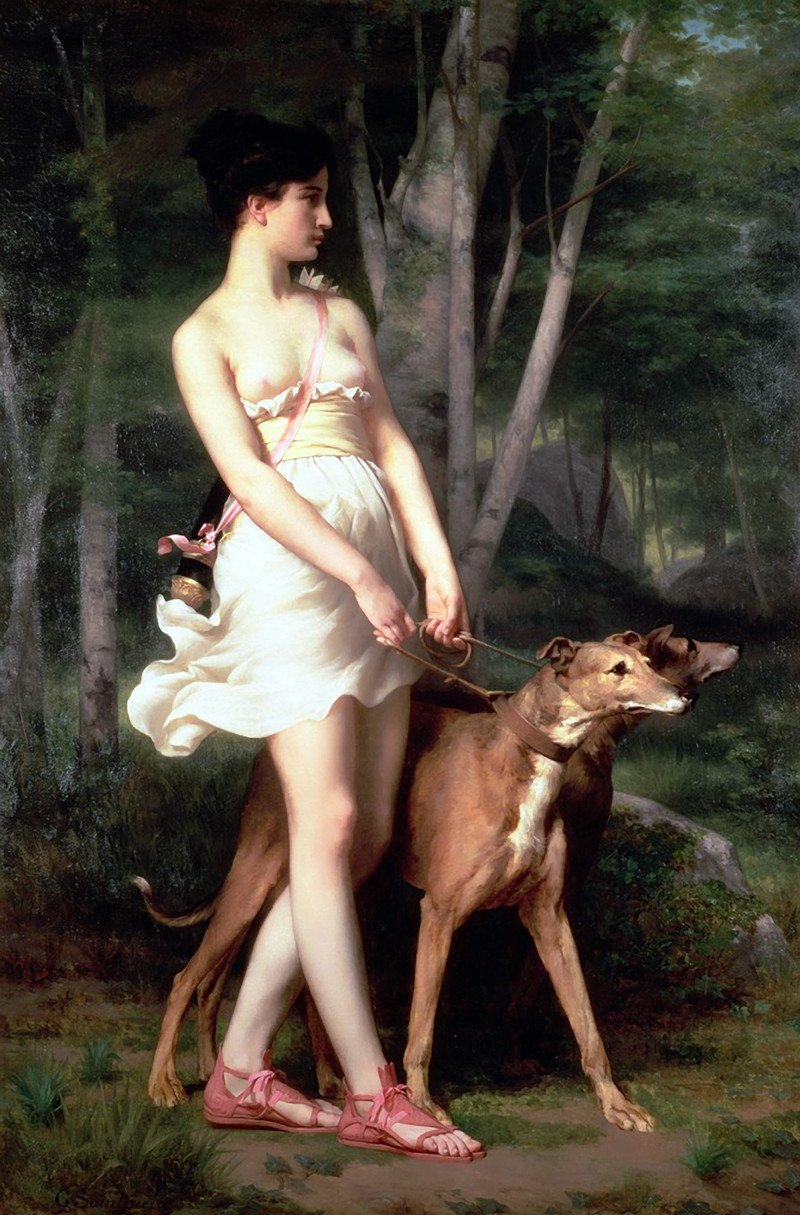
Diana the Huntress by Gaston Casimir Saint-Pierre

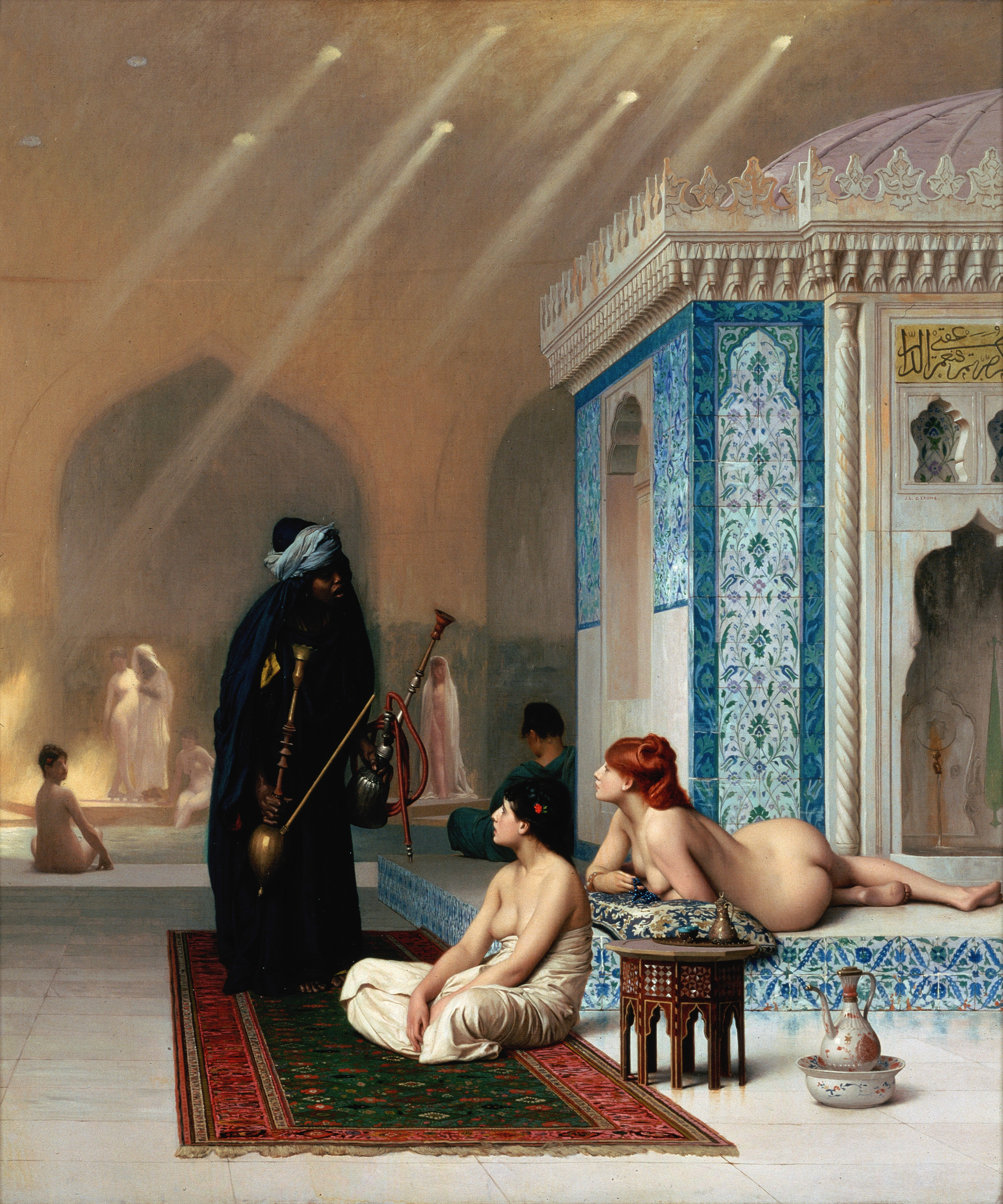
Pool in a Harem (1876) by Jean-Léon Gérôme

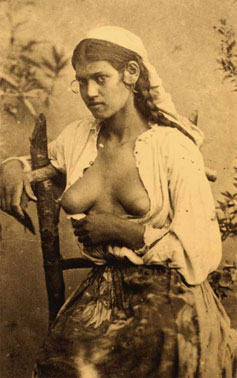
Portrait of a Gipsy Maiden (1870) by Carol Szathmari

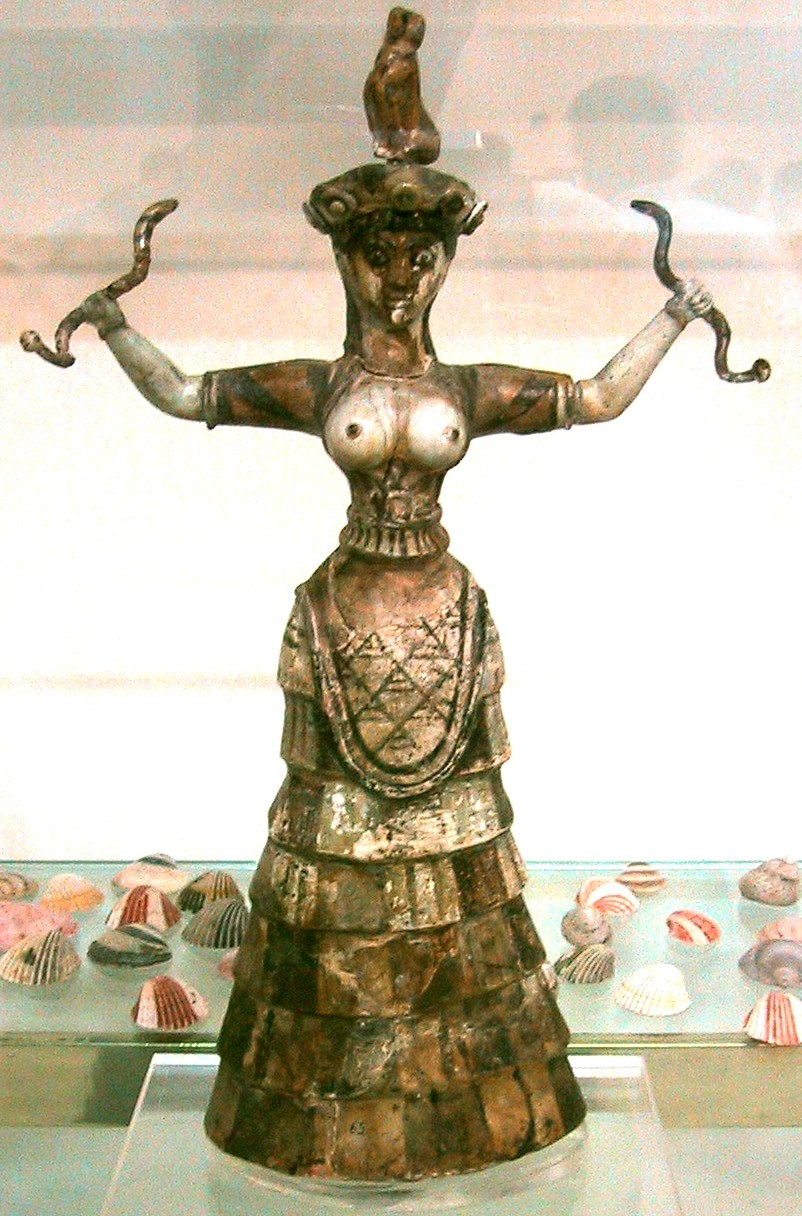
A "Snake Goddess" statuette of ancient Minoan Civilization (c. 1600 BC)

== See also ==
- Bralessness
- Breast fetishism
- Outdoor Co-ed Topless Pulp Fiction Appreciation Society
- Sex-positive feminism
- Go Topless Day
