= Dorota Krzysztofek =

Polish model

Dorota Krzysztofek (born 1980) is a Polish glamour model from Szczecin modeling for men's magazines such as CKM. She is known for winning a court battle in 2008–2009 that reasserted women's right to sunbathe topless on public beaches in Poland.

In mid May 2008 Krzysztofek – along with her female companion – were fined by local municipal officials for sunbathing topless at a public recreation area known as the Arkonka beach (pictured). Both women refused to pay the fine and took the matter to Civil Court in Szczecin. Their first September hearing had to be postponed due to remarkable media interest. On 7 November 2008 judge Beata Szczepańska upheld the city staff decision, and charged the women with indecent exposure, explaining that their personal freedoms cannot encroach on the freedoms of families with children who frequent the same recreation spot. Although topless sunbathing is not prohibited, the judge ordered the two defendants to pay a fine of 230 zlotys (150 zlotys by different source, or €40, $55) for breaking the rules of conduct. In her decision judge Szczepańska also reprimanded the women and said that it is not up to them to teach youngsters human anatomy. However, the court decision was appealed by Krzysztofek's female friend soon afterwards, with the plea of not guilty.

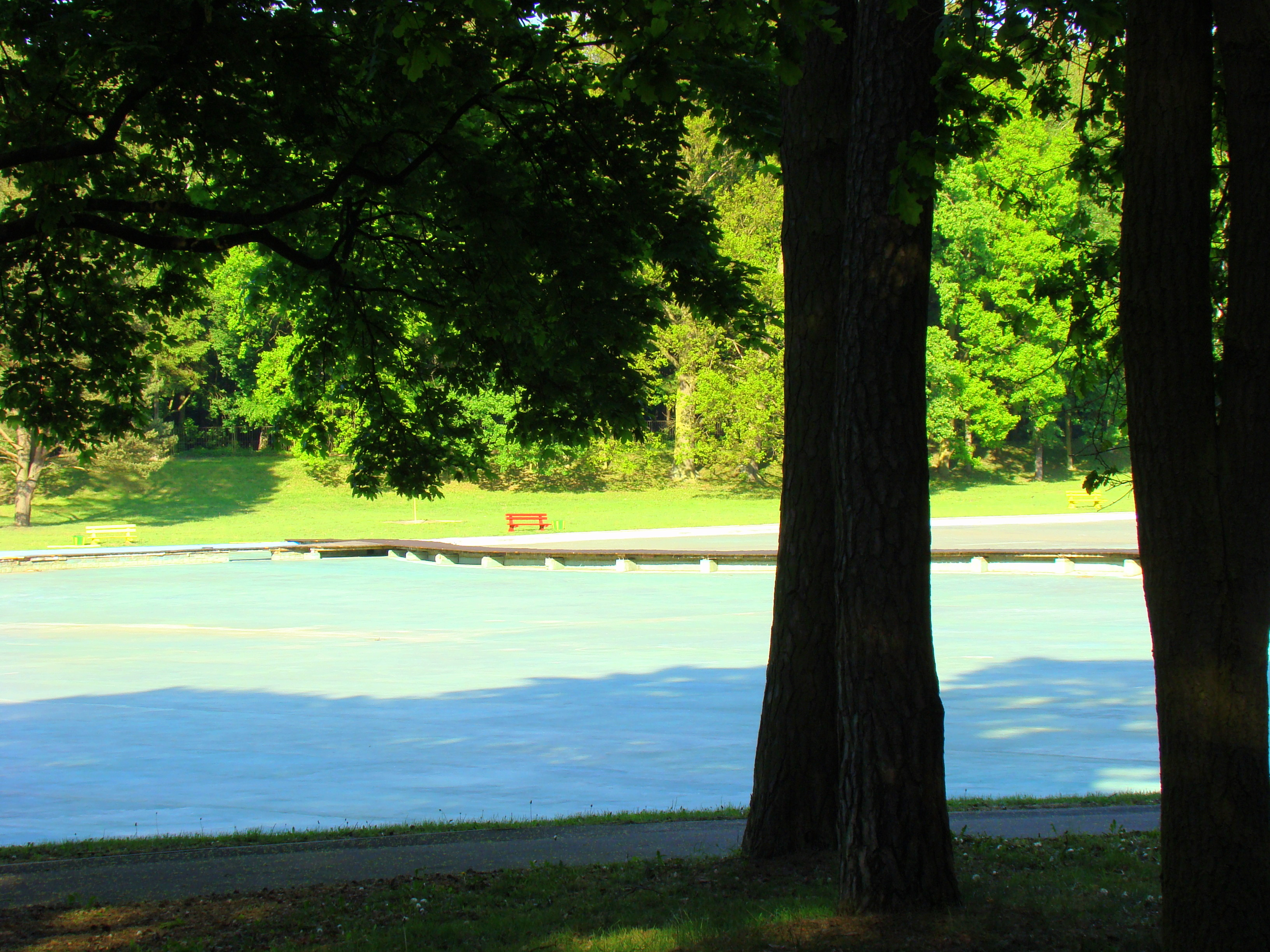
Arkonka beach, recreation park and pool in Szczecin

The appellate court declared both women to be innocent, because the city staff were unable to prove that anyone at the beach was indignant or scandalized by their nudity, and no complaint was ever filed, or even reported. On the contrary, some visitors stood up to their defense. There were no signs at the beach against what is otherwise legal. The appellate court’s decision was binding, but – as noted by journalist Magda Hartman – it also created an aura of ambivalence since topless sunbathing in public was therefore declared acceptable but only if no other sunbathers (including families with children) formally object to it.
