= Tissiflashmob =

June 2019 and 2020 protests in Helsinki, Finland

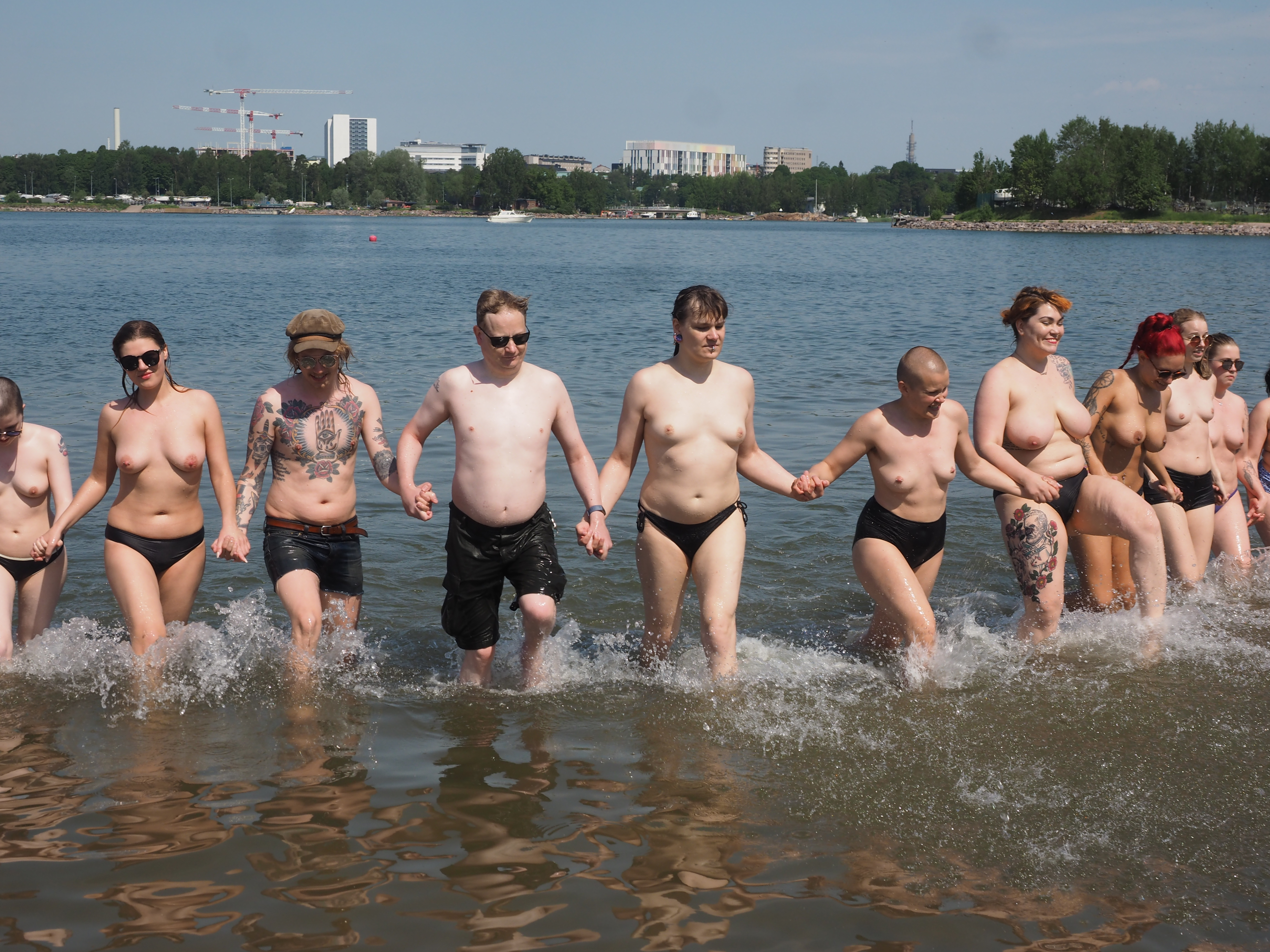
Women participating in Tissiflashmob revealed their breasts in public as a demonstration for gender equality. Men also participated in the demonstration.

Tissiflashmob (Finnish for "tits flash mob") was a demonstration organised by Sandra Marins and Säde Vallarén, which was held for the first time in June 2019 at the Hietaniemi beach in Helsinki, Finland. The organisers held the demonstration in criticism for a previous event where a woman had been removed from a beach for sunbathing topless.

The demonstration was held for a second time in 2020 in eight cities and also online. This time the demonstration was held by the feminist activist group Cult Cunth.

== See also ==
- Free the nipple
- Go Topless Day
- Topfreedom
