= Hietaniemi beach =

Sand beach in Helsinki, Finland

Coordinates: 60°10′27″N 024°54′24″E

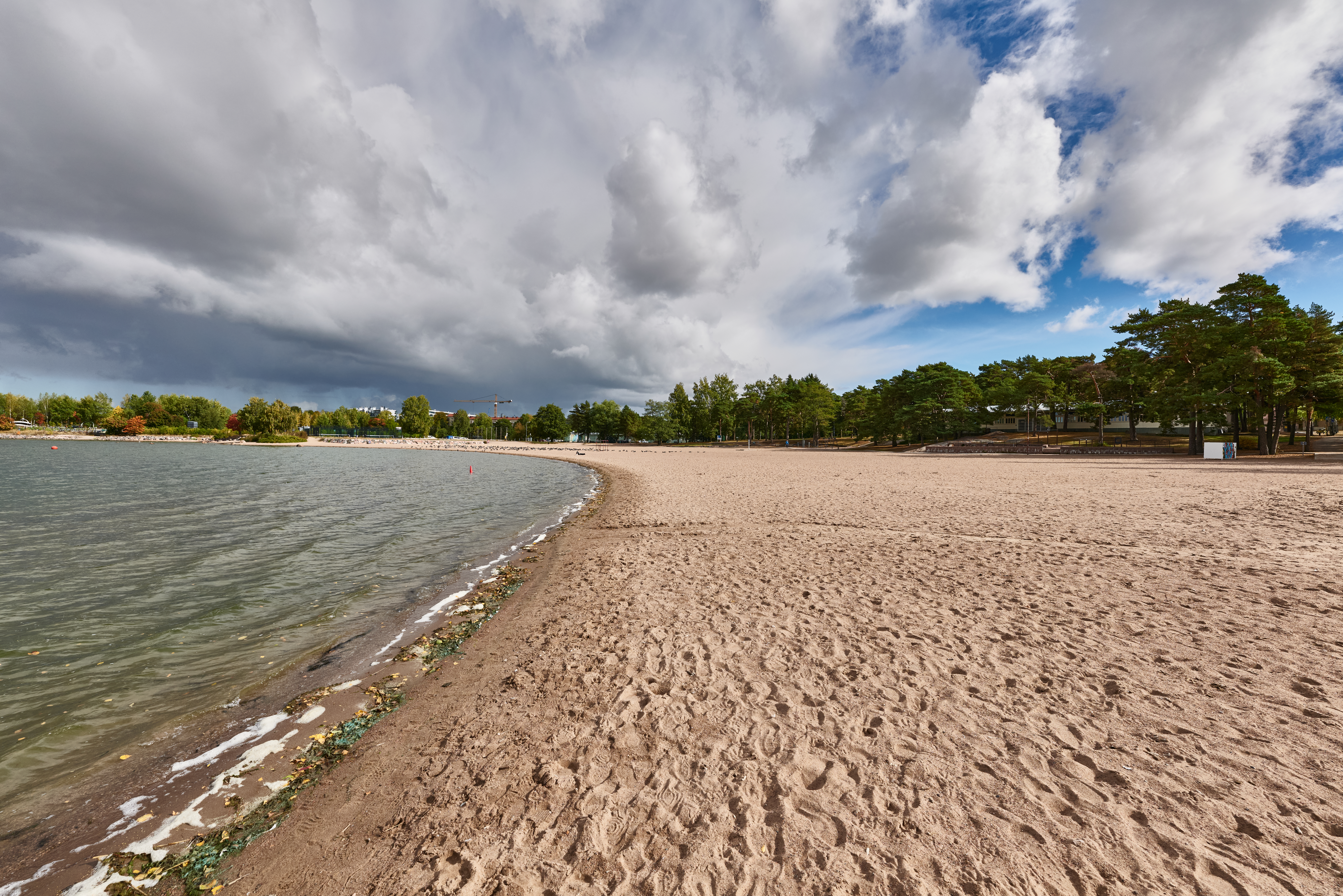
Hietsu

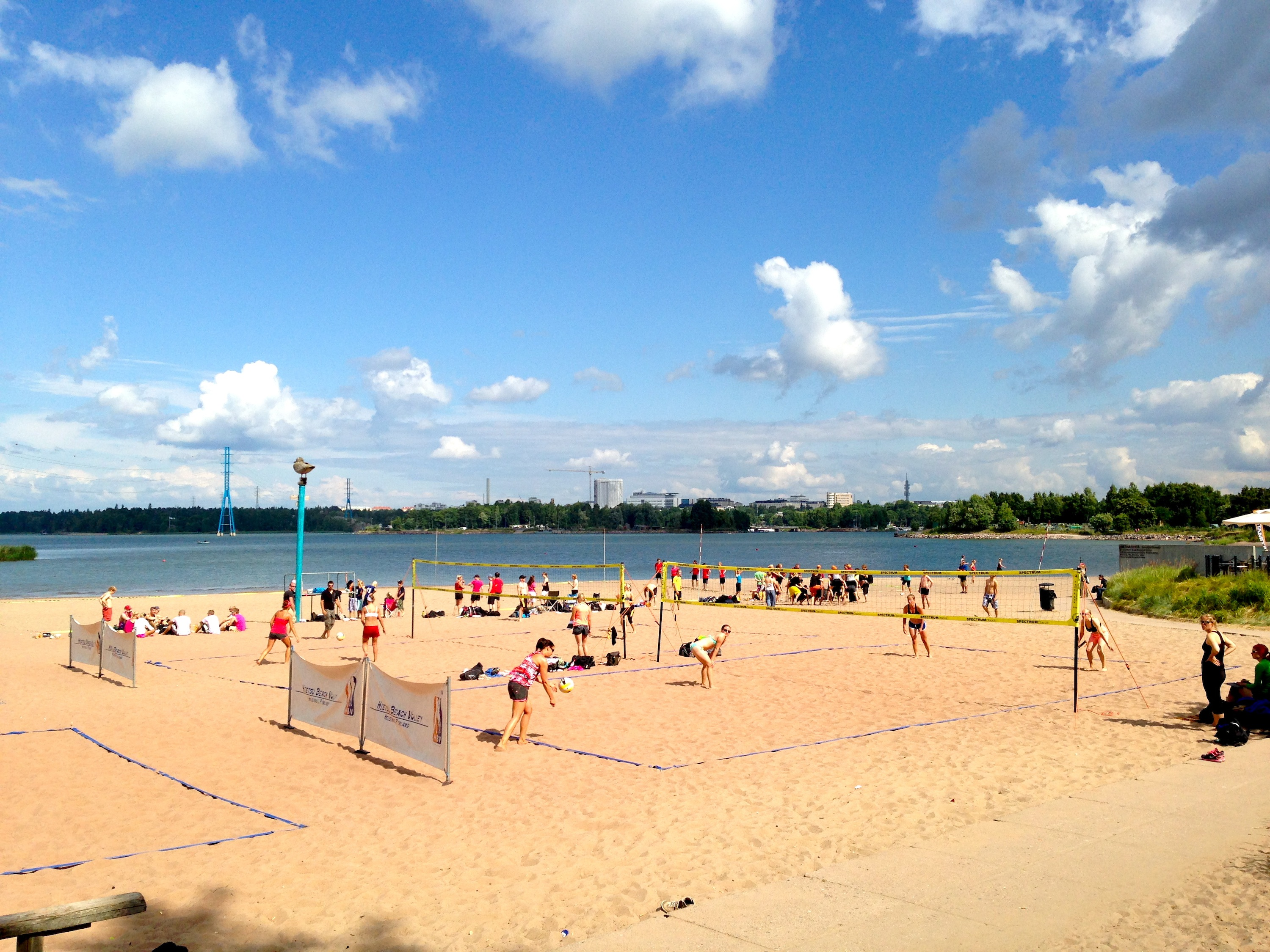
Beach volleyball and beach ultimate being played at Hietaniemi in July, 2013.

Hietaniemi beach (Finnish: Hietaniemen uimaranta or Hietaranta, Swedish: Sandudds badstrand or Sandstrand; colloquially Hietsu) is a popular sand beach in central Helsinki, Finland. It is located in the Töölö district, next to the Hietaniemi Cemetery and is the most popular beach in central Helsinki.

On the hill next to the beach is a stone sundial designed in 1931 by Gerda Qvist.

== History ==
In the beginning of the 20th century the remote area of Hietaniemi was being used as a landfill and was converted into an area for sand storage. Sand was brought in by barges from the bottom of the sea for a number of years. The sand was never really used, however, but was just left there to spread. In 1929, the locals adopted the area as a sand beach.

Being close to the city centre, the beach is nowadays a popular summer destination for locals and tourists. It is also a popular place for playing beach volleyball, and since 1995 the Hietsu Beach Volley tournament has taken place there.

In 2013 and 2017, the beach hosted the Rock the Beach Festival and in 2014 the Sonisphere Festival. The Weekend Festival was held on the beach in August 2018.

Furthermore, there were two protests held on the beach in June 2019 and 2020 known as Tissiflashmob.

== See also ==
- Aurinkolahti Beach
- Kalajoki Beach
- Yyteri Beach
