= Women in pre-Islamic Arabia =

There is very scarce information regarding women in pre-Islamic Arabia.

== Legal status and treatment ==
=== Tribe ===
In pre-Islamic Arabia, tribes played an important role in shaping the peninsula's practices and culture. Tribes often had male leaders known as sheikhs, however this is not always the case. Some high-ranking women of influential tribal families appear in later oral traditions as mediators or peace-brokers, suggesting that women could, in certain contexts, affect inter-tribal relations. In what is now modern day Yemen, Queen Biliqis ruled Saba'. In Neo-Assyrian records from the 8th century BCE, queens such as Shamsi and Zabibe were acknowledged as leaders of Arab territories, this practise of having female tribal leaders continued until recent pre Islamic era such as Umm Qirfa, who was a tribal leader that ruled the Banu Fazara tribe that opposed the Islamic prophet Muhammed. These matriarchal practices were part of Arabian culture and tradition until Islam significantly altered the sociocultural landscape of the Arabian Peninsula which adopted a more patriarchal system of leadership as Muhammed said "A nation who entrust their command to a woman will not succeed"Sahih Bukhari, Hadith: 4425. While these inscriptions do not detail everyday women’s lives, they demonstrate how women could have held positions of leadership titles under certain circumstances.

Many assumptions have been made about pre-Islamic law due to discrepancies in the understanding of how the law was enacted within Arabian society in that time. The main functional unit of Arabian society, the tribe, was composed of those who had connections to a common relative. The tribe itself was tied together by a mutual understanding of spoken rules which could vary considerably depending on the tribe and its economic activities, including women's roles and rights. The rules were enforced by the tribal leader who also mediated the discussion of new laws. Individual men within the tribe were allowed to suggest new rules, but they would not be enacted until a consensus had been reached by the entire group. Many of these tribes were of patrilineal descent and therefore were only formed by male links traced down from each generation. In the tribal society, women generally had no right to dictate who they chose to marry. However, the tribe did offer the woman protection if she was maltreated by her husband.

During the pre-Islamic times between 3500 and 3000 BCE, many of the city-states containing the individual tribes continually changed who had the authority to dictate. Much of this change occurred due to the tribal warfare taking place among these tribes. As the governmental power continued to be overturned and replaced, the laws towards women became more limiting as time went on. For some time, husbands had the right to pawn their wives and children, beat them mercilessly, or pull their hair without being penalized for these actions. The only chief right a woman had during these times was stated in the Code of Hammurabi in 1752 BCE, "women could obtain a divorce only with great difficulty. If a woman so hated her husband, that she has declared, 'you may not have me', her record shall be investigated at her city council". The quote further goes on to state that if the court does not find the wife to be at fault, then she will be allowed to return to her father's home.

=== Veiling ===
During pre-Islamic times, the Assyrian law clearly depicted within their written regulation who was allowed to veil. Those women who were family to "seigniors" had to veil as well as those who were previously prostitutes but now married. Laws on veiling were so strict that intolerable consequences were enacted for these women, some of which included being severely beaten or cutting their ears off. Prostitutes and slaves were prohibited from veiling. The veil was not only used to classify women according to their status, but also to label them based on their sexual activity and marital status.

=== Women of upper class status ===
While the general population of women in pre-Islamic Arabia did not have many rights, upper-class women had more. Many became 'naditum', or priestesses, which would in turn give them even more rights. These women were able to own and inherit property. In addition, the naditum were able to play an active role in the economic life of their community. The Samad Late Iron Age population in central Oman shows archaeologically women of both high and low social rank.

== Marriage practices ==
In pre-Islamic Arabia, a variety of marriage practices existed. The most common and recognized types of marriage at this time were marriage by agreement, marriage by capture, marriage by purchase, marriage by inheritance and Mut'ah or temporary marriage.

== Family structure and motherhood ==
Research on the family structure of pre-Islamic Arabia has many ambiguous views so it becomes difficult to know the exact structure of the family during this time period. Family structure that may have been of a typical tribe during pre-Islamic Arabia was patriarchal and the relations in the family were between other relations with men. It was vital for families to have boys rather than girls because men were viewed as superior to women. Within the family the women did not have any parental rights over their children even if the father had died, and it is claimed that women had no rights of inheritance. However, it is clear that many widows were able to inherit from their husbands and were quite wealthy, Muhammad's wife Khadija and many other early widows of Islam included, before the surahs on inheritance were given. One of the most important roles of the mother within the household was for her to give birth to children, and to produce male offspring. Even though women had few rights within the household they did partake in few roles within society. Some of the activities the women did were making meals, milking animals, washing clothes, preparing butter, weaving material for tents, and spinning wool.

The child mortality rate was very high, and it was very common for parents to lose a child in infancy or during the child's childhood due to certain diseases and ailments. If the infant survived the community would hold a social feast in celebration of the infant's survival where they would name the child, and slaughter a sheep in honor of the child's birth. Children were not at fault for the same criminal punishments as adults. During this time period, it was seen as high importance for women to produce male offspring because they were seen as superior and also as the most fundamental component to be able to fight in the difficult desert conditions.

Family planning was very important and certain aspects are put into place before anything takes course, but the family planning did not apply to everyone. People were concerned with circumstances that may impact their family and or the community. The process of planning the family structure is mutually between the husband and wife. An important aspect of the family structure is determining the number of children the mother has, and spacing out the pregnancies as a way to make sure the health of the mother and children are not at risk, and also strengthen the well-being of the family. People also enforced the importance of having the mother breast-feed, which was an infant's basic right for two years.

== Female infanticide ==
The existence and prevalence of female infanticide in pre-Islamic Arabia is disputed by historians. Islamic thought came to think the pre-Islamic era, which they referred to as the age of Jahiliya, as one of barbarism, darkness, and ignorance, which indicate a bias of Islamic sources of pre-Islamic Arabian culture. Independent evidence from this period, however, is scarce. Tradition itself is often late (originating in the second and third centuries of Islam) and often limited to legend, proverb, poem, and other forms of non-historiographical content. Occasionally, infanticide is mentioned in pre-Islamic Arabic poetry but when it is, it does not explicitly mention female infanticide, rather general non-gendered infanticide. Typically, religion is not seen as a valid historical source, However, some interpret the Quran as supporting the historicity of the practice of female infanticide in pre-Islamic Arabia, but researchers have disputed this.

Archaeological surveys across the Arabian Peninsula covering burial sites, settlements and inscriptions have not confirmed the systematic practice of widespread female infanticide. Although infanticide did occur in many ancient societies when resources were scarce or in times of crisis for religious reasons or others, explicit proof that this practice existed systemically and disproportionately targeted girls in pre-Islamic Arabia remains unsupported.

Apart from lack of pre Islamic Arabic records mentioning female infanticide there is also a lack of other wider historical records, Non-Arab writers (Greek, Roman, Persian) who commented on Arabian culture did not highlight female infanticide as a hallmark of the region, the most significant spread of this claim is religious text such as the Quran. Given how fragmented and diverse pre-Islamic Arabia was, it is improbable that any single social practice particularly an extreme one prevailed uniformly across all communities.

Some academics refer to these narratives as exaggerations stemming mainly from religious beliefs because they appear to serve moral polarization in depicting pre-Islamic times as ignorant or cruel can support the idea of Jahiliyyah. Moreover, the lack of direct epigraphic confirmation: Inscriptions and tomb markers from that era rarely if ever, reference infant-killing, even though they do mention other child-related matters (such as dedications for sons and daughters). An example of this is the funerary remains at sites like Qaryat al-Fāw in central Arabia and Mada’in Salih(ancient Hegra in the Nabataean sphere) reflect relatively equal burials for children, with little indication of targeted female-only infanticide.

Historical societal justifications of infanticide include the need to reduce population sizes and removal of defective members (like the sick, those with physical abnormalities, the socially legitimate, etc). The Quran has usually been interpreted as mentioning and condemning infanticide during the pre-Islamic period, as "qatl al-awlad" (killing male and female children). In the hadith, this phrase also encompasses coitus interruptus (hidden infanticide), abortion, and the burial of live infants to prevent the shedding of blood (which was thought to make it humane). Works of law (fiqh) and other hadith describe additional pre-islamic ways to commit infanticide, such as by hurling them off of cliffs, drowning them, or leaving them in the woods.

Some interpret the Quran as describing infanticide as a means to prevent poverty or a solution for the liability of female children. Some sources claim females were liabilities in some tribal societies.

== See also ==
- Women in Arab societies
- Women in Islam
