= List of social nudity places in North America =

This is a list of places where social nudity is practised in North America for recreation. This listing includes notable nude beaches and private resorts. This listing also includes places where female toplessness is permitted in jurisdictions where it is normally forbidden.

== Anguilla ==
Nude bathing on beaches is illegal in Anguilla.

- Captain's Bay is a secluded beach where people bathe nude (illegally).

== Antigua and Barbuda ==
The only beach in Antigua and Barbuda with legally sanctioned nudity is Eden Beach. The beach is open to everyone but access is through the Hawksbill Resort. Guests at the resort have access to lounge chairs and umbrellas. The resort also staffs a small hut during the tourist season which offers cold drinks to resort guests.

== Canada ==
=== Alberta ===
- CottonTail Corner Naturist Beach, near Edmonton
- GET NAKED BANFF is an annual activity in Banff National Park.
- Weaslehead Clothing-Optional Area located in Weaselhead Flats in Calgary
- Hidden Beach - Clothing Optional Area Fish Creek Provincial Park in Calgary
- Prince's Island Park - Clothing Optional Area located in downtown Calgary.
- Sunny Chinooks Camping Association has a landed campground for members near Sundre.
- Helios Nudist Association, between Edmonton and Tofield, is billed as North America's northernmost nudist camp.
- Nose Hill Park has been used as a within city limits hiking spot for naturists for years and is in a sort of legal grey area and can be legally justified with a lawful excuse. Many sports utilize parks for summer training and parks are used for many ethical purposes. Lawful excuse is not comprehensively defined, but rather evolves over time based on case law and the circumstances of the moment. The introduction of the “lawful excuse” provision introduces the opportunity for a defendant to provide evidence that could meet “an air of reality threshold test” and therefore allow an acquittal.

=== British Columbia ===
British Columbia has thousands of kilometres of coastline and thousands of lakes, as well as millions of hectares of natural parks and undeveloped land. The vast majority of these areas are mostly uninhabited and nude swimming and sunbathing can be done with little concern for disturbing others. In the populated areas, particularly the Lower Mainland, Greater Victoria, and the Okanagan, nudity is generally practiced only in certain established or isolated locations (usually beaches) and on private properties.

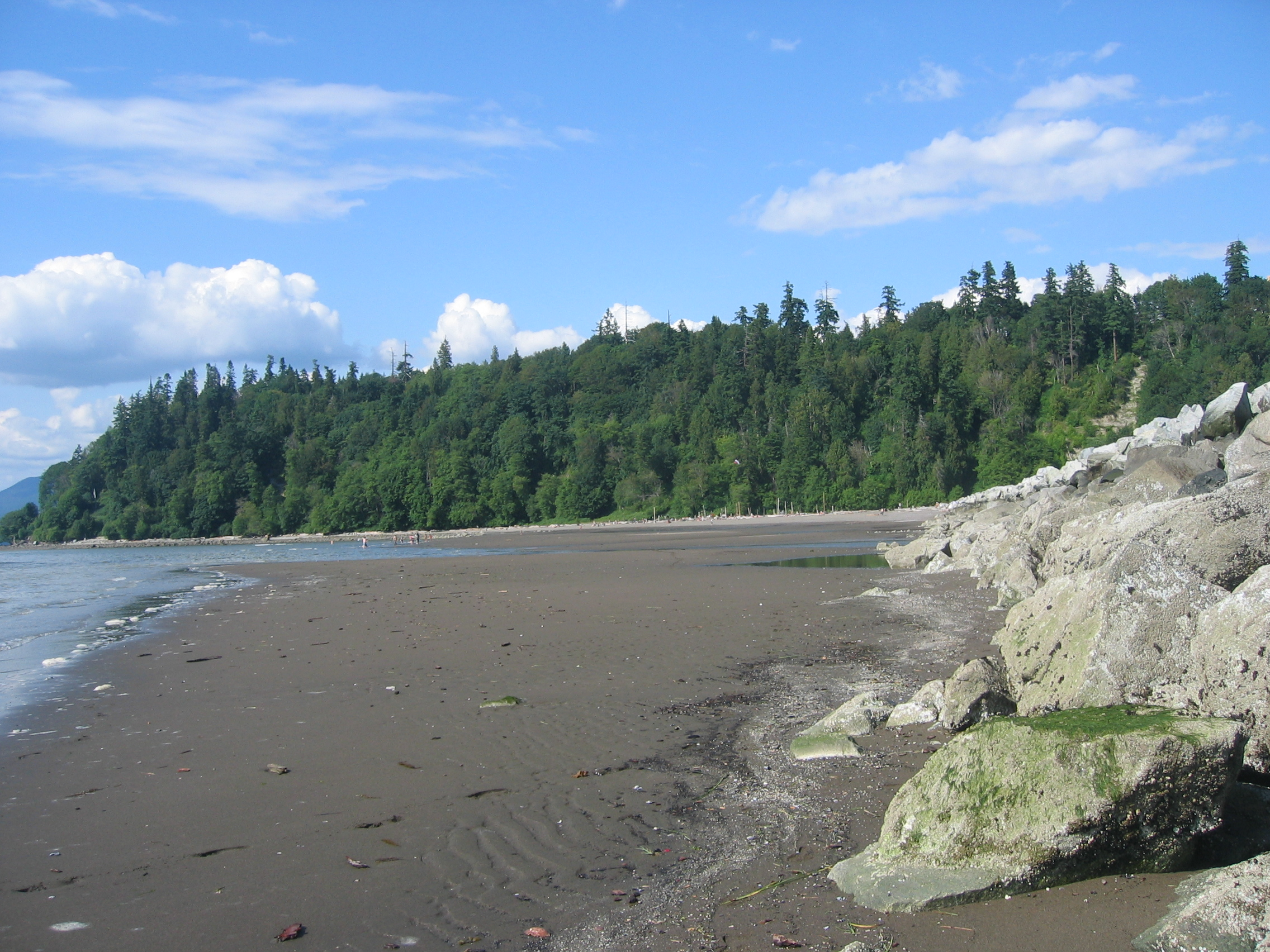
Wreck Beach from a distance

- Blackburn Lake, Salt Spring Island
- Brunswick Beach, Lions Bay
- Crescent Rock Beach, Surrey
- Little Tribune Bay, near the Tribune Bay Provincial Park on Hornby Island
- Lost Lake, Whistler
- Mission Flats Beach, Kamloops
- Nipple Point in Salmon Arm sees occasional nude use.
- Norrish Creek, Mission
- Prior Lake on Vancouver Island near Victoria
- Sol Sante Club, north of Victoria on Vancouver Island
- Van Tan Club, naturist club near North Vancouver
- Witty's Lagoon Regional Park in Metchosin near Victoria, at the southern extremity of the beach (beyond the painted "nude" signs on fallen trees)
- Wreck Beach is the second largest clothing-optional beach in North America with over 100,000 visitors each year. On the shore of the Georgia Strait and the north arm of the Fraser River, it is part of Pacific Spirit Regional Park, which is adjacent to the University Endowment Lands, just west of the city limits of Vancouver.

=== Manitoba ===
- Naturist Legacy Park, a family-oriented naturist park
- Patricia Beach
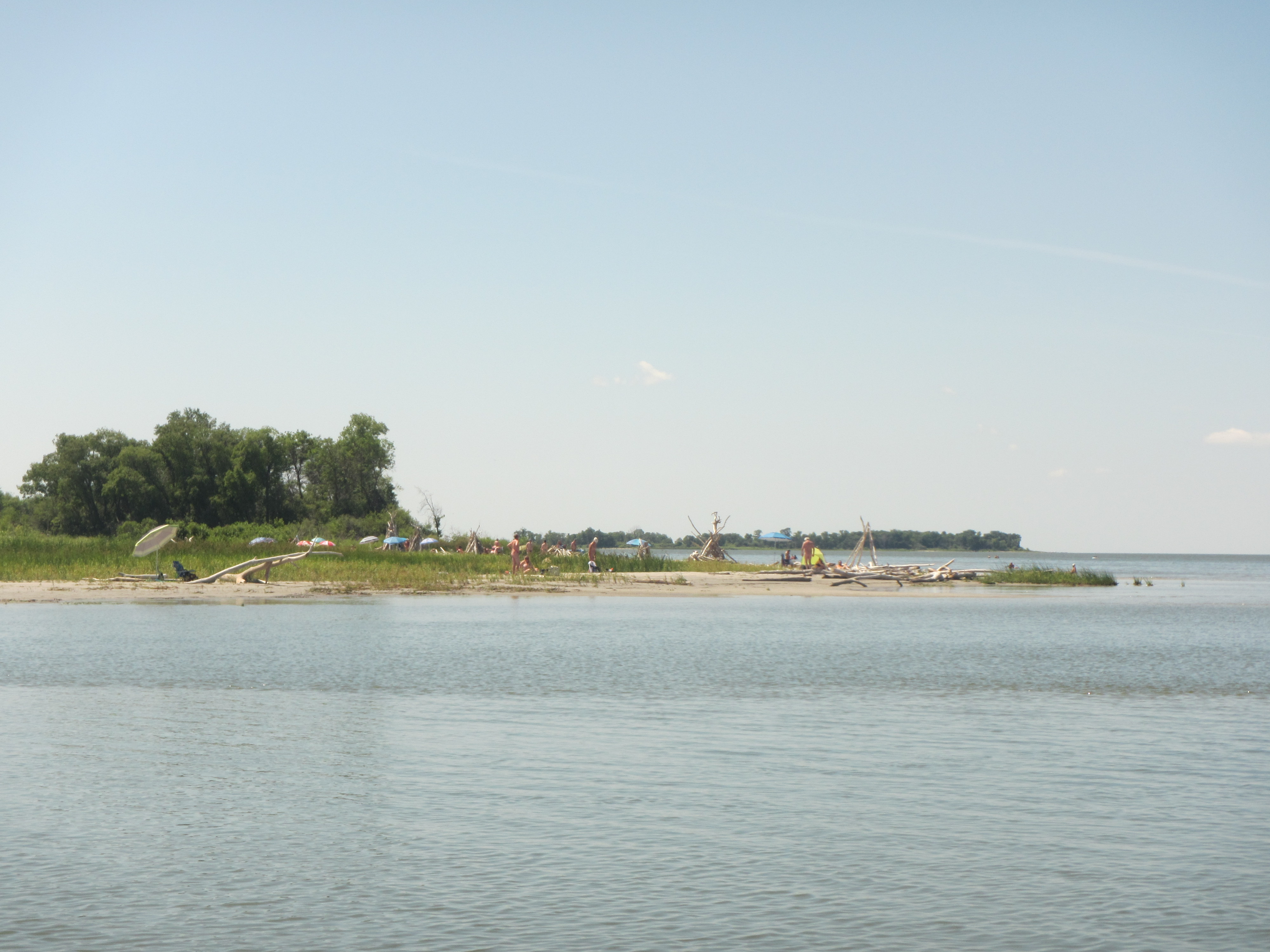
  Patricia Beach nude section viewed from across the channel that separates Patricia from Beaconia beaches

=== Newfoundland and Labrador ===
- Soldiers Pond in St. John's, unofficial clothing-optional swimming area
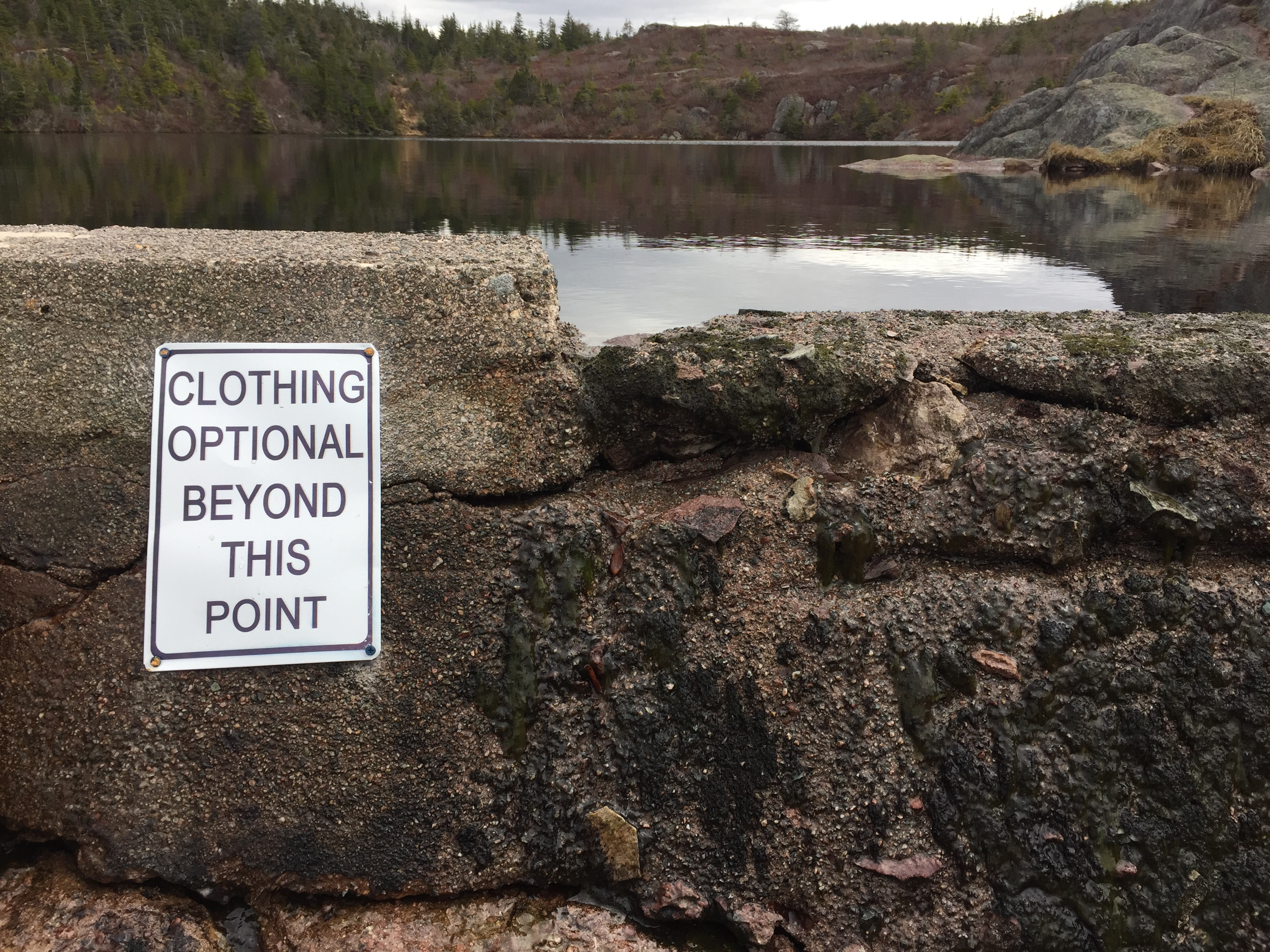
  Soldiers Pond in Newfoundland

=== Nova Scotia ===
- Crystal Crescent Beach in Provincial Park, near Sambro, has a clothing-optional section.

=== Ontario ===
All areas of Ontario, unless otherwise specified by town or city by-laws, allow both males and females to be topless in public.

- Bare Oaks Family Naturist Park is a year-round facility north of Toronto in East Gwillimbury.
- The Basin and The Landing on Lake Meech in Gatineau Park, Quebec.
- East Haven Sun Club in The Nation
- Ponderosa Nature Resort in Flamborough
- Port Burwell Beach in Port Burwell Provincial Park
- Sunny Glades Naturist Park in Bothwell
- Sunward Naturist Park in Calabogie

==== Toronto ====
The city of Toronto permits nudity at public events, such as the World Pride Parade and the World Naked Bike Ride.

- Bare Bluffs Nude Beach, Toronto
- Hanlan's Point Nude Beach on the Toronto Islands

=== Quebec ===
Quebec has its own "Fédération québécoise de naturisme" (Quebec Naturism Federation). As the only French-speaking province in Canada, it has the distinction of having its own federation of francophones naturists. There are no officially recognized nude beaches in the province, but there are places that have secluded areas where nudity is accepted.

- Parc national d'Oka (Oka National Park)
- Plage du Lac Simon, Duhamel
- Plage du Parc de la Pointe-Taillon, Lac Saint-Jean
- Plage de Boom Défense, Gaspé Peninsula
- Plage de Cap-aux-Oies, Charlevoix
- Meech Lake, Gatineau Park, National Capital Region

==== Montérégie ====
- Centre écologique et naturiste La Pommerie

==== Bas-Saint-Laurent ====
- Centre naturiste La Vieille Ferme

==== Centre-du-Québec ====
- Camping D.S.A

==== Lanaudière ====
- Centre naturiste l’Oasis inc.

=== Prince Edward Island ===
- Blooming Point Beach, in Prince Edward Island National Park along the northern shore of Prince Edward Island, contains an unofficial clothing-optional beach.

=== Saskatchewan ===
- Greenhaven Sun Club, naturist campground near Regina
- Paradise Beach (Bareass Beach), near Saskatoon

== Costa Rica ==
- Montezuma Beach – Playa Grande
- Playa Playitas, west of Manuel Antonio National Park and south of Quepos

== Cuba ==
- Cayo Largo
- Cayo Santa Maria
- La Mariela

== Dutch Antilles ==
=== Curaçao ===
Curaçao has no legal nude beaches. There are several beaches on the west end of the island that allow topless sunbathing.

- The Natural Curaçao is a clothing-optional mini-resort in Willemstad that also offers boat trips.

=== Sint Maarten ===
- Club Orient, Orient Bay, family-friendly clothing-optional beach resort

== French Antilles ==
The following beaches in the French Antilles.

=== Guadeloupe ===
- Plage Anse Tarare (Beach) The naturist beach of Saint-François in Guadeloupe is Anse Tarare. It is the only officially naturist beach on the island. It is located near Pointe des Châteaux.
- Plage naturiste de Sainte-Rose (Beach) other naturist beach.
- Domaine naturiste Lizardy (Nudist hotel Bungalows)

==== Îles des Saintes (Guadeloupe) ====
- Anse Crawen, near Bourg
- Le Paradis Saintois, Terre-de-Haut (Naturist Residence)

=== Martinique ===
- Plage Petite Anse des Salines (Beach) It is the only officially naturist beach in Martinique.
- Plage Anse Trabaud (Beach) other naturist beach.
- Villa Fleurs De Canne Martinique (Nudist hotel).

=== St. Barths ===
Toplessness is common on most beaches. Nudity is encountered at:

- Gouveneur Beach (at the western end)
- Saline beach (towards the east and little further in the small bay called Petite Saline)

=== Saint Martin ===
Toplessness is permitted on all beaches on the French side of the island, but many secluded beaches attract nude sunbathers.

- The Jardin d'O is a couples-only clothing-optional resort located between Grand Case and Orient Bay.
- Kazanu is an adult-only clothing-optional (An adult-only Clothing optional stay).
- Orient Bay Beach (Baie Orientale) includes an official nude south section
  - Residence Adam & Eve is an adult-only clothing-optional resort located at Orient Bay close to the nude beach. Nude catamaran sailing cruises are also available.

=== Overseas departments ===
==== Caribbean ====
===== Guadeloupe in Antilles =====
- Plage Anse Tarare (Beach) The naturist beach of Saint-François in Guadeloupe is Anse Tarare. It is the only officially tolerated naturist beach on the island. It is located near Pointe des Châteaux.
- Plage naturiste de Sainte-Rose (Beach) other tolerated naturist beach.

===== Martinique in Antilles =====
- Plage Petite Anse des Salines (Beach) It is the only officially tolerated naturist beach in Martinique.
- Plage Anse Trabaud (Beach) other tolerated naturist beach.

===== Saint Martin in Antilles =====
- Club Orient (Nudist residences, Destroyed in Hurricane Irma 2017, It has not been rebuilt to date).
- Plage Orient Bay (Beach).
- Résidence Adam & Eve (nudist hotel)

== Grenada ==
- Beach off Sandals LaSource Resort

== Honduras ==
While public nudity is not legally accepted, it is tolerated at resorts and private places if practiced discreetly. Paya Bay Resort in the Bay Islands has clothing optional beach at certain times during the year.

== Jamaica ==
While toplessness is accepted, there are no public nude beaches and few clothing-optional resorts.

- Couples Negril
- Couples Sans Souci
- Couples Tower Isle
- Hedonism II, Negril

== Mexico ==
Beach nudity in Playa Zipolite, Mexico is legal. Elsewhere, Mexican law condemns only "immorality" and thus the issue ends up being a matter of the judge's criteria.

- Cancún
  - Cancún has one of the Temptation Resort locations.
- Puerto Vallarta, Jalisco
  - Destilerías, Nayarit, north of Puerto Vallarta and Bucerías, has a beach where nudity is "tolerated."
- Zipolite, Oaxaca
  - As of 2016, Playa Zipolite is Mexico's first legal nude beach. Annually since 2016, on the first weekend of February, Zipolite has hosted Festival Nudista Zipolite organized by the Federación Nudista de México.
  - Hotel Nude, Zipolite's first nude-optional resort
  - CAMP, clothing-optional hostel and gathering center
- Tulum, Playa del Carmen, Quintana Roo
  - AZULIK is a clothing-optional resort in Tulum. Beside Papaya Playa Project, its beach is accessible for nude sunbathing.
  - Intima Resort (formerly Mak Nuk), nude resort in the town of Tulum
  - Isla Mujeres, Quintana Roo, has beach areas where topless sunbathing occurs, especially at Playa Norte.
  - Playa del Carmen
    - Hidden Beach
    - Desire and Desire Pearl, adult lifestyle hotels
- Xcalak, Quintana Roo
  - Playa Sonrisa is a clothing optional resort where nude sunbathing and diving occurs.

== Panama ==
- Isla Contadora (especially at Playa de las Suecas) in the Pearl Islands

== St. Lucia ==
- Ladera Resort

== Trinidad and Tobago ==
- Back Bay, Tobago - nude bathing is practiced (illegally)
- Number Five, Trinidad - members-only nudist club

== United States ==
Additional and up-to-date information on public and private locations may be obtained on the web sites of the American Association for Nude Recreation (AANR) and The Naturist Society (TNS). Other organizations that represent nudism and naturism includes The American Naturist Society and Bluegrass Naturist Society.

=== Alabama ===
- Bluff Creek Falls Campground in Steele
- Gymno-Vita Park near Pell City
- Parksland Retreat in Talladega

=== Alaska ===
Public nudity is illegal in Alaska. Toplessness is legal when practiced without the intention of offending others.

=== Arizona ===
Public nudity is illegal in Arizona, but may not be enforced at hot springs.

- Arizona Sunburst Inn in Phoenix, which caters to men.
- El Dorado Hot Spring in Tonopah
- The Magic Circle (magiccirclearizona.com) is located in a clothing-optional portion of the La Posa South Long Term Visitor Area (LTVA) south of Quartzsite.
- Mira Vista Resort in Marana, family-oriented clothing-optional resort
- Shangri La Ranch in New River, family-oriented naturist facility
- Upper Tanque Verde Creek in Tucson
- Valle de Vistas Clothing Optional B&B in Sedona
- Verde Hot Springs (springs only, not the campground) is traditionally nude.

=== Arkansas ===
Public nudity is illegal in Arkansas in the presence of the opposite sex; however, same-sex nudity is legal.

- Magnetic Valley Resort in Eureka Springs, a private male-only clothing-optional resort

=== California ===
- Alameda County
  - The Sequoians, Castro Valley, nudist club
- Humboldt County
  - Baker's Beach, between Trinidad and Moonstone. Humboldt North Coast Land Trust claims to own this property.
  - College Cove Beach, Trinidad
- Inyo County
  - Keough Hot Springs, near Bishop
  - Saline Valley Warm Springs, Death Valley National Park
- Lake County
- Los Angeles County
  - Arroyo del Sol Clothing Optional B&B in Pasadena-Altadena is part of Clothing Optional Home Network and is an AANR Participating Business.
- Marin County
  - Red Rock Beach, south of Stinson Beach
- Mono County
  - Little Hot Creek east of Mammoth Lakes
- Monterey County
  - Garrapata State Park
  - Marina Beach State Park (south side)
  - Zmudowski State Beach, unofficial clothing-optional beach in Moss Landing
- Napa County
  - Meadowlark Country House near Calistoga
- Nevada County
  - South Yuba River – Hoyts Crossing is an area of swimming holes on the South Yuba
- Riverside County
  - Glen Eden Nudist Resort in Corona, membership-only naturist club
  - Sea Mountain Couples Nude Resort and Spa Hotel
- Sacramento County
  - Laguna del Sol in Wilton, clothing-optional resort
- San Bernardino County
  - Deep Creek Hot Springs in the San Bernardino National Forest near Apple Valley, clothing-optional hot spring
  - Starland near Joshua Tree, a clothing-optional campground and retreat
- San Diego County
  - Black's Beach in La Jolla, San Diego is one of the largest and most-visited nude beaches in the United States. The northern part of the beach is in a state park where nudity is officially permitted, while the southern part is on city property where nudity is illegal but somewhat tolerated.
- San Francisco City and County
  - San Francisco has traditionally tolerated public nudity to a greater degree than anywhere else in California. A law passed by the city council in the fall of 2012 and which went into effect in February 2013 made public nudity an infraction outside of a few designated areas. Female toplessness remains legal throughout the city.
  - Baker Beach in San Francisco. The north end of the beach is officially sanctioned by the National Park Service as clothing-optional.
  - Land's End within the Golden Gate National Recreation Area, an officially-sanctioned nude beach
- San Luis Obispo County
  - Pirates Cove near San Luis Obispo
- San Mateo County
  - Devil's Slide or Gray Whale Cove State Beach
  - San Gregorio nude beach near San Gregorio
- Santa Barbara County
  - Montecito Hot Springs in Montecito
  - More Mesa Beach
- Santa Clara County
  - Lupin Lodge in Los Gatos, naturist resort
- Santa Cruz County
  - Bonny Doon Beach
  - Laguna Creek Beach
  - Santa Cruz, all bathers regardless of gender may go topless by county ordinance

=== Colorado ===
Female toplessness is allowed in the cities of Denver, Boulder and Fort Collins, since these cities do not make any distinction between female toplessness and male bare chested. On February 15, 2019, The 10th Circuit Court of Appeals ruled in favor of Free the Nipple as to female toplessness being equal to male toplessness. This decision legalized female toplessness in the state.

- Dakota Hot Springs (formerly known as "The Well"), in Penrose
- Desert Reef Hot Spring in Florence
- Dream Canyon just outside Boulder
- Mountain Air Ranch in Indian Hills
- Orvis Hot Springs, in Ridgway
- Valley View Hot Springs and the Orient Land Trust

=== Connecticut ===
- B&G of Connecticut, East Hartford, private social club for male naturists
- Solair Recreation League in Woodstock, family-oriented naturist resort and campground, owned and operated by its members
- Sun Ridge Resort in Sterling, family-oriented naturist resort and campground

=== District of Columbia ===
- Potomac Rambling Bares, non-landed club for naturists in the Washington, D.C. metropolitan area, Maryland and Virginia areas

=== Florida ===
==== Public beaches ====
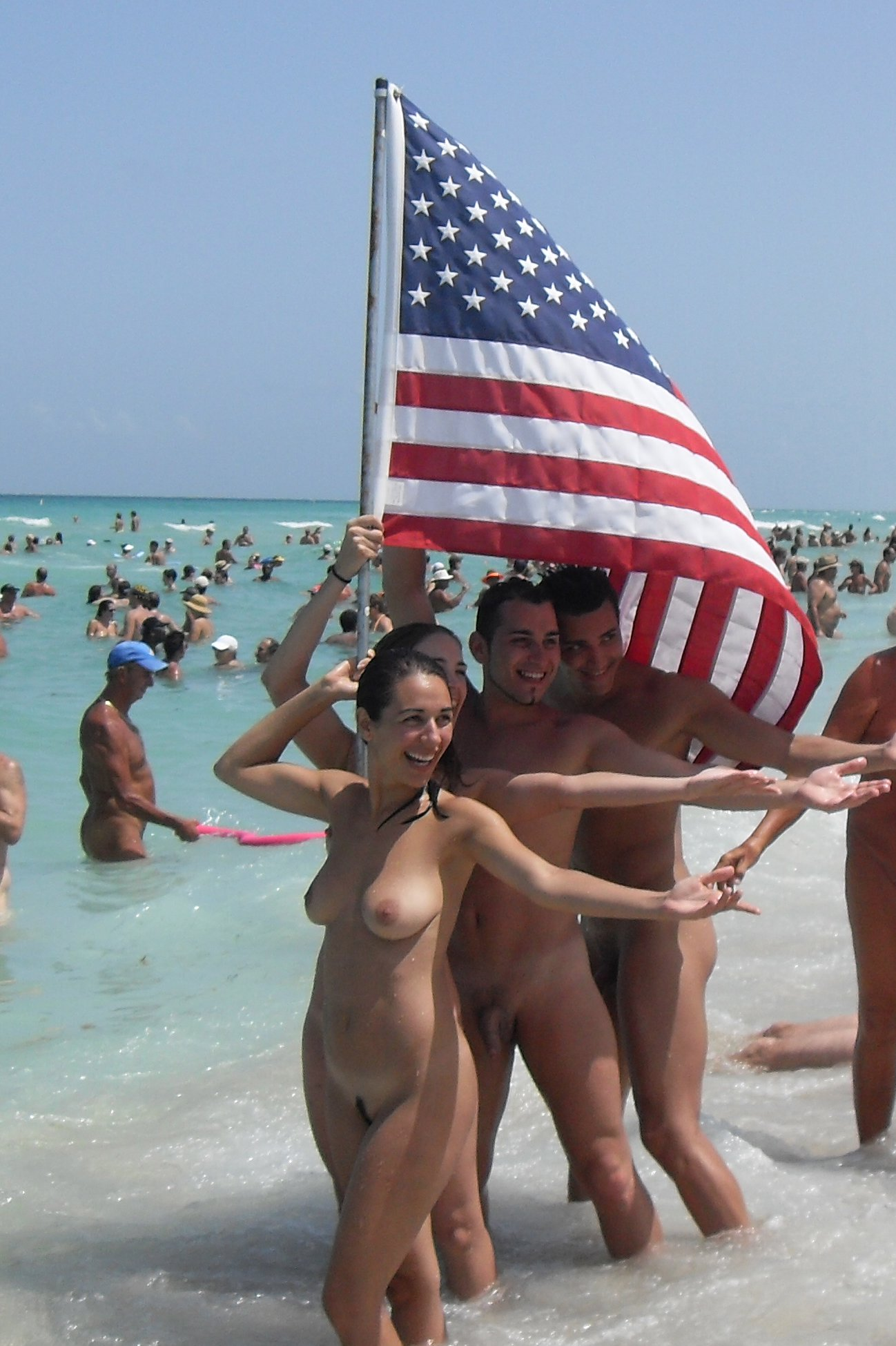
Haulover Beach world record skinny dip

- Apollo Beach inside the Canaveral National Seashore near New Smyrna Beach. The accepted clothing-optional sunbathing part of the national seashore is in Volusia County, which does not have an anti-nudity ordinance.
- Blind Creek Beach, near Ft. Pierce
- Boca Chica Beach on Boca Chica Key near Key West
- Haulover Beach in Miami-Dade County, one of the most popular nude beaches in North America
- Playalinda Beach in Titusville
- Puckett Creek located on pump house rd on the Merritt Island National Wildlife Refuge in Titusville
- South Beach in Miami Beach permits topless sunbathing. Additionally, a few hotel pools in Miami Beach also allow female toplessness.

==== Private resorts and campgrounds ====
- Caliente Tampa in Land o' Lakes, a clothing-optional resort
- Casa Alegra Clothing Optional B&B in Sarasota County is part of Clothing Optional Home Network and is an AANR Participating Business.
- Cypress Cove Nudist Resort, in Kissimmee
- Eden RV Resort (formally, Gulf Coast Resort) in Hudson
- First Coast Naturists, a non-landed, AANR-chartered and TNS-affiliated organization based in Florida
- The Island Group in Land o' Lakes
- Key West Private Charters offers snorkeling, scuba diving, and motorboat trips on which nudity is permitted.
- Lake Como Family Nudist Resort in Lutz
- Lake Linda Circle in Land o' Lakes
- Next Generation Naturists, a non-landed organization focused on the young adult (18- to 35-year-old) demographic
- Paradise Lakes in Pasco County, a clothing-optional lifestyle resort
- Paradise Pines RV Park in Lutz
- Bare RV (formerly Riverboat Club) in Land o' Lakes
- Riviera Naturist Resort in Pace
- Sawmill in Dade City, a gay nudist community
- Sunny Sands Resort in Pierson
- Sunshine Beach Club (also known as Florida Naturist Park) in Hudson
- Sunsport Gardens in Palm Beach County
- Suwannee Valley Resort in White Springs, an AANR-chartered clothing-optional resort
- Vitambi Springs near Clewiston, an all-male clothing-optional campground
- The Woods RV Park in Land o' Lakes, a clothing-optional RV park and resort

=== Georgia ===
- Bell Acres Resort in Maysville, AANR and TNS affiliated
- Hidden River Resort in Saint George, with a mailing address of Sanderson, Florida, AANR affiliated
- In the Woods in Canon
- Mountain Creek Grove Resort, adult-only resort in Cleveland
- Native Woods Naturist Park in Darien
- The Naturist Escape in East Ellijay, a non-landed, all-ages, social naturist organization based out of the north Georgia mountains
- Paradise Valley Resort and Club in Dawsonville, a naturist club
- River's Edge in Dewy Rose
- Serendipity Park, family-friendly facility in Cleveland, AANR and TNS affiliated

=== Idaho ===
- Bare Mountain Retreat, a family-oriented facility near Boise
- Goldbug Hot Springs, south of Salmon
- Jerry Johnson's Hot Springs on the Nez Perce-Clearwater National Forest

=== Illinois ===
- Blue Lake Resort, family-oriented nudist park in Erie
- The Chicago Fun Club, a non-landed social nudist club
- The Den off Eastlake in Chicago, a male-only bed and breakfast
- Nude Dudes Chicago is a group of 18- to 40-year-old gay men who host public nudity related events in the Chicago area.
- Paradise Creeks Retreat near Aurora, hosts nudist events

=== Indiana ===
- Nude sunbathing and swimming has occurred at Indiana Dunes State Park and Indiana Dunes National Park.
- Casita en el Lago Clothing Optional Bed and Breakfast near Valparaiso. It is part of Clothing Optional Home Network and AANR-affiliated.
- Drakes Ridge Rustic Nudist Retreat in Bennington
- Fern Hills Club in Bloomington
- Lake O' Woods Club in Valparaiso, a member-owned, family-oriented, cooperative nudist club
- Our Haven Nature Sanctuary in French Lick, a private clothing-optional festival ground
- Ponderosa Sun Club in Roselawn, an adult-only nudist resort
- Sunaura Resort, an adult-only clothing-optional camp
- Sunny Haven Recreation Park in Granger, located near South Bend, a family-oriented nude recreation park
- Sunshower Country Club in Centerville, a family-oriented nudist resort

=== Kansas ===
Public nudity is legal in Kansas, in all jurisdictions, under state law.

- Camp Gaea, a non-denominational retreat center/campground near McLouth that tolerates nudity in some areas
- Lake Edun, a family naturist facility near Topeka affiliated with The Naturist Society
- Prairie Haven in Scranton, a family nudist club affiliated with AANR and The Naturist Society
- Sandy Lane Club in Hutchinson, associated with AANR

=== Kentucky ===
As of 2026, public nudity is not a legal practiced, and is classified as indecent exposure in almost all cases. A law from 1942 passed by the Kentucky House of Representatives Permits Public Nudity for Nudists and Naturists and Organizations affiliated with the lifestyle; however, the law was repealed in 1968. Since then, Kentucky allows for nudity in private spaces, but public nudity falls under “Indecent Exposure in the First Degree” in the Kentucky Revised Statutes section 510.148.

==== Clubs ====
Bluegrass State Nudists - Northern Kentucky Bluegrass Naturists - Central Kentucky

==== Campgrounds ====
- River Ridge Ridge 21+ Guys Only Clothing Optional Campground - River Ridge is located at 1385 Harding Rd, Mt Olivet, KY 41064. This campground is clothing optional and has two hot tubs and a swimming pool and have Kayak Rentals. It is located along the Licking River the campground offers RV seasonal residents, RV, Tent and Cabin Camping as well. This is a Gay Friendly Campground as well. Membership is required but they offer day passes as well.

==== Places ====
- Doe Run Lake Nude Recreation Area - Doe Run Lake is located at 1501 Bullock Pen Rd, Covington, KY 41017. The Trail at the Top of the hill off the main road goes about a mile and a half and ends at a creek. While listed as a naturist recreation area by the Bluegrass State Naturists, they have not received permission to designate the park by the authority of Kenton County, Kentucky. As of April 2026, the park and trails are not an official or legal naturist recreation area. A spokesperson for the judge executive issued a statement of “We are aware of recent social media posts regarding Doe Run Lake, so we want to be very clear: Doe Run Lake is a County-owned park, and there is zero tolerance of nudity of any kind.”

=== Louisiana ===
- Bayou Allure Clothing Optional B&B in Baton Rouge, part of Clothing Optional Home Network
- Indian Hills Nudist Park, a clothing-optional campground in Slidell
- Sandy Bares, a private campground in Metairie

=== Maine ===
Female toplessness is allowed throughout the state, since Maine's law only prohibits the public exposure of the genitals. Local ordinances may restrict toplessness and nudity.

- Maine Coast Solar Bares, nudist travel club that meets at the Sauna in Richmond
- Richmond Sauna Bed & Breakfast in Richmond
- Twin Ponds Lodge is a private membership-only social club near Waterville. It is adult-only and male-only.

=== Maryland ===
- Camp Ramblewood in Darlington is available for groups wishing to host clothing-optional events.
- Maryland Area Naturist Association, a family nudist club in Baltimore
- Maryland Health Society in Davidsonville, a privately owned nudist club
- Pine Tree Associates in Annapolis, a cooperatively-owned family nudist club

=== Massachusetts ===
- Cape Cod:
  - Marstons Mills: Sandy Terraces Associates is a family-oriented, co-operative campground.
  - Provincetown: Public nudity is tolerated on the beaches around Provincetown, especially in the area that is not part of the Cape Cod National Seashore.
  - Truro: Public nudity is unofficially tolerated on Longnook Beach.
- Nantucket: Toplessness has been legal on the island's beaches since 2022. Public nudity is unofficially tolerated in the area between Miacomet Beach and Surfside Beach.
- Martha's Vineyard:
  - Lucy Vincent Beach in Chilmark contains an area where public nudity is permitted.
  - Moshup Beach in Aquinnah contains an area where public nudity is unofficially tolerated.
  - MVBoat offers private charter trips on which nudity is permitted.

=== Michigan ===
- Cherry Lane Resort in North Adams
- Forest Hills Club in Saranac
- Northaven Resort in Brooklyn
- Nuance Bed and Breakfast in Battle Creek
- The Schvitz in Detroit
- Spruce Hollow Campground in Mesick
- Turtle Lake Resort in Union City
- Whispering Oaks Nudist Resort in Oxford

=== Minnesota ===
- Avatan in East Bethel (affiliated with AANR)
- Oakwood Club near Stacy is a private AANR-affiliated landed club.
- Two Creeks Campground near Sandstone is a clothing-optional association.
- Several other landless clubs operate in the northern suburbs of Minneapolis and St. Paul.

=== Mississippi ===
- Running Bare B&B in Long Beach
- Sandy Bares Travel Club in Moss Point
- West Ship Island, near Gulfport

=== Missouri ===
- Bare Acres Retreat is a clothing-optional campground in Putnam County.
- Cactus Canyon Campground, near Ava, a male-only nude campground
- Forty Acre Club, in Lonedell, a family-friendly nudist campground
- Heartland Naturists, a non-landed group organized in Kansas City affiliated with The Naturist Society
- Natural Pines Resort in Memphis, a clothing-optional, adult lifestyle-friendly campground
- Show Me Acres in Stover, a former family-oriented nudist resort and campground. (now closed until further notice due to the owners retirement)
- Sunset Mountain in Noel, is an exclusive, reservation-only 18 and up nudist venue.

=== Montana ===
Simple nudity in Montana is not necessarily against the law, but nudity can be considered indecent exposure if accompanied by any sexual activity or any activity intending to affront or alarm another or for sexual gratification. However, many towns and municipalities have separate ordinances restricting nudity within town and city limits.

- The Oasis 33, a clothing-optional retreat in southeast Montana

=== Nevada ===
- Lake Tahoe's Nevada shore has several clothing-optional beaches including the following:
  - Secret Cove
  - Chimney Beach
  - Creek Beach (also known as Secret Creek Beach or Secret Harbor Creek Beach)
  - Black Sand Beach
  - Boaters Beach
  - Whale Beach 1 and 2
- Black Rock City, in the desert outside of Gerlach, hosts Burning Man where clothing is optional.
- Las Vegas Naturists, a private clothing-optional resort, allowing only couples and adults
- The Mirage's poolside lounge "Bare" in which guests can go topless. This is one of the few hotel pools in Las Vegas that allow female toplessness.
- Sea Mountain Nude Resort and One Love Temple in Las Vegas Strip, a couples-only lifestyle club and spa

=== New Hampshire ===
- Cedar Waters Village in Nottingham, a non-secular, heterosexual-only park
- Naturist New Hampshire, a clothing-optional travel club

=== New Jersey ===
- Gunnison Beach in Sandy Hook, a part of the National Park Service's multi-state Gateway National Recreation Area, is a clothing-optional beach and is the largest such beach in the Northeastern United States. Gunnison Beach also has a prominent gay nudist area, one of the most popular gay beaches in New Jersey. In 1999, New Jersey passed a law a bill that prohibits all types of nudity on state or municipal beaches, making Gunnison Beach the only legal nude beach in the state, since it is on federal land not subject to state or municipal regulations. Gunnison Beach offers dramatic views of Brooklyn and the Verrazzano–Narrows Bridge and is officially recognized as clothing-optional with permanent park signs and full lifeguard and police protection.
- Higbee Beach, Cape May; not a sanctioned nudist area, but nudity is commonplace
- Rock Lodge Club, a family-oriented nudist club in the Highlands forests of New Jersey
- Sky Farm Club in Basking Ridge, a family-oriented nudist resort

=== New Mexico ===
- Bare Cottage in Coyote in the Santa Fe National Forest
- Faywood Hot Springs north of Deming, a partially clothing-optional camping resort
- Ten Thousand Waves in Santa Fe, a Japanese-style mountain spa resort

=== New York ===
Due to a 1992 Court of Appeals ruling (People v. Santorelli et al.), women may be topless anywhere in the state of New York for non-commercial purposes. (A concurring minority opinion reached the constitutional, i.e., equal rights issue, but the majority decision did not.)

- Alice Falls in Keeseville, family-friendly nude sunbathing
- Brushwood Folklore Center in Sherman
- Cherry Grove Beach in Cherry Grove on Fire Island, a largely gay-oriented beach
- Colonial House Inn, a B&B in Chelsea, Manhattan with a clothing-optional area
- Coxing Kill Stream at Mohonk Preserve in Gardiner, sanctioned clothing-optional hiking trail (Closed in 2020)
- Empire Haven in Moravia
- Full Tan Sun Club in Sprakers
- Potters Falls in Ithaca
- Stony Kill Falls, near the Mohonk Preserve

=== North Carolina ===
Public nudity is considered indecent exposure in North Carolina under * § 14–190.9 which states that

"(a) Unless the conduct is punishable under subsection (a1) of this section, any person who shall willfully expose the private parts of his or her person in any public place and in the presence of any other person or persons, except for those places designated for a public purpose where the same sex exposure is incidental to a permitted activity, or aids or abets in any such act, or who procures another to perform such act; or any person, who as owner, manager, lessee, director, promoter or agent, or in any other capacity knowingly hires, leases or permits the land, building, or premises of which he is owner, lessee or tenant, or over which he has control, to be used for purposes of any such act, shall be guilty of a Class 2 misdemeanor."

"The statute does not define what constitutes a private part, so the courts have dictated that it refers to genitals, but it does not include a person's buttocks or a woman's breast."

- Bar-S-Ranch in Reidsville
- Lucky Lovers in New Bern
- Masonboro Island
- Pleasure Island, North Freeman Park, Carolina Beach unofficial nude sunbathing allowed
- Upper Creek Falls in Newland
- Whispering Pines Nudist Resort near Bird Island in Ocean Isle Beach
- Jordan Lake Multi-Use Area in Apex - This area features sandy, secluded enclaves a short walk from NC-751. Areas not in sight of the highway see frequent, unofficial nude sunbathing.

=== North Dakota ===
Public nudity is illegal in North Dakota. Topless sunbathing is not illegal in North Dakota.

=== Ohio ===
- Alpine Resort in Millersburg
- Cedar Trails in Peebles
- Dayton Warm Breezes Naturist Club in Dayton
- Freedom Valley Camp in New London
- Great Lakes Sunseekers in Toledo
- Green Valley
- Hillside Haven in Otway
- Northcoast Naturists in Cleveland

=== Oklahoma ===
- Oaklake Trails in Depew, a clothing-optional family-oriented nudist resort
- Oklahoma Naturists in Stuart, an adult-only nudist bed and breakfast and winery affiliated with AANR

=== Oregon ===
Public nudity is generally legal in Oregon, unless it is part of a commercial venture or intended to induce sexual excitement. Some parts of Oregon (including Portland, Eugene, Ashland and Happy Valley) have local laws prohibiting public nudity. However, Oregon law defines nudity as displaying genitals, hence both men and women are allowed to be topfree in public throughout the state.

- Alpenglow Ranch Clothing Optional B&B and Resort in Bend part of Clothing Optional Home Network and AANR-affiliated
- Bagby Hot Springs
- Breitenbush Hot Springs
- Collins Beach on Sauvie Island near Portland
- Common Ground Wellness Cooperative in Portland
- Everett House Community Healing Center in Portland
- Glassbar Island Beach, near Eugene on the Willamette River
- McCredie Springs
- Mountaindale Sun Resort (formerly Restful Haven Nudist Resort) in North Plains
- Rooster Rock State Park along the Columbia River
- Serenity Mountain Retreat (formerly Squaw Mountain Ranch) in Estacada, a family-oriented nudist resort
- Terwilliger Hot Springs (also known as Cougar Hot Springs)
- Umpqua Hot Springs
- The Willamettans between Marcola and Springfield, nudist resort

=== Pennsylvania ===
- Beechwood in Lehighton
- Camp Out Poconos in East Stroudsburg, Pennsylvania
- Hillside Campground in New Milford
- Oneida Campground in New Milford
- Pen Mar Club in Warfordsburg
- PSHS Inc. in Mohnton
- Sunny Rest in Palmerton
- White Thorn Lodge in the Pittsburgh suburb of South Beaver Township
- The Woods Campground in Lehighton
- Bad Sauna in Pittsburgh

=== Rhode Island ===
- Dyer Woods Nudist Campground in Foster, a family-oriented nudist campground
- Mohegan Bluffs/Black Rock Beach on Block Island

=== South Carolina ===
- Carolina Foothills Resort in Chesnee
- Cedar Creek Resort in Leesville, an adult-only clothing-optional resort

=== Tennessee ===
- Edun Hill Campground in Clinton
- Excalibur, Camelot Campground in Mosheim
- Pandora's Resort in Crossville
- Pleasure Lakes Resort in Sparta
- Rock Haven Lodge Inc. in Murfreesboro
- Timberfell Lodge & Resort in Greeneville

=== Texas ===
Texas has no laws forbidding female toplessness, although in most parts of the state topless women may be charged with disorderly conduct. Austin tolerates female toplessness within its city limits.

- The Barehide Ranch in Poolville
- Bluebonnet Family Nudist Park in.Alvord
- Emerald Lake Resort in Porter
- Freedom RV in Pleasanton
- Healthy Hides, non-landed nudist group affiliated with AANR
- Hippie Hollow Park, a swimming beach on Lake Travis in Austin where nudity is permitted
- Live Oak Resort in Washington-on-the-Brazos
- Matagorda Beach has an unofficial nudist area
- Purple Peacock Resort in Palestine
- Star Ranch Nudist Resort in McDade
- Wildwood Naturists Resort in Decatur

=== Utah ===
- Fifth Water Hot Springs (also known as Diamond Fork Hot Springs) near Salt Lake City

It is actually illegal to be nude at fifth water hot springs.

=== Vermont ===
Vermont state law prohibits disrobing in public but does not prohibit public nudity, so nudity is allowed anywhere that it has not been specifically prohibited by a city or town. The act of disrobing is often referred to as "you can leave the house nude in Vermont, but you can't take your clothes off", but this is not always the case, as the public view clause does not prohibit the simple act of changing clothes out of view, such as in a forest or at a swimming hole. The city of Burlington, for example, has prohibited nudity in public parks, but nudity is allowed anywhere else in the city, such as the longtime University of Vermont tradition of a semester's end naked bike ride around parts of the campus. Vermont's numerous rural swimming holes encourage the practice of nudity by skinny dipping, and the comparatively loose laws about exposure within the state reduce any legal conflicts or police interactions concerning nudity. While this means that realistically almost any public space in Vermont can be used for nude recreation, specific locations at which individuals deliberately are welcomed to practice social nudity include:

- The Gargoyle House in Wells River, a male-only clothing-optional retreat
- Knight Island, an island in Lake Champlain near St. Albans
- Lake Willoughby in Westmore, in Willoughby State Forest; the south beach is clothing-optional
- The Ledges, on the Harriman Reservoir in Wilmington
- Rock River in Newfane
- Starr Farm Beach in Burlington

=== Virginia ===
- White Tail Resort in Ivor

=== Washington ===
- Arcadia Romantic Getaway in Arcadia, couples-oriented nudist resort
- Denny Blaine Beach and Howell Park, Seattle nude beaches
- Dogfish Beach near Bellingham, nude beach
- Kaniksu Ranch, near Spokane, nudist resort
- Lake Bronson Club in the Cascade foothills, a family-oriented nudist park
- Tiger Mountain Family Nudist Park is a recreational park at Tiger Mountain
- Triangle Recreation Camp, near the Cascades, an LGBTQ-oriented clothing-optional campground
- Vantage Beach on Wanapum Reservoir, a nude beach

=== West Virginia ===
- Avalon Resort, clothing-optional resort in Paw Paw

=== Wisconsin ===
- Camp NCN in Black River Falls, a "sexual freedom" campground, allowing nudity and public sexual activity
- Valley View Recreation Club near Cambridge

== See also ==
- Indecent exposure in the United States
- Female toplessness in Canada, United States
- List of social nudity places in South America

== Sources ==
- Woycke, James (2006). Au Naturel: The History of Nudism in Canada. FCN. ISBN 978-0-9682332-3-8. Archived from the original on August 5, 2020.
