= Female toplessness in the United States =

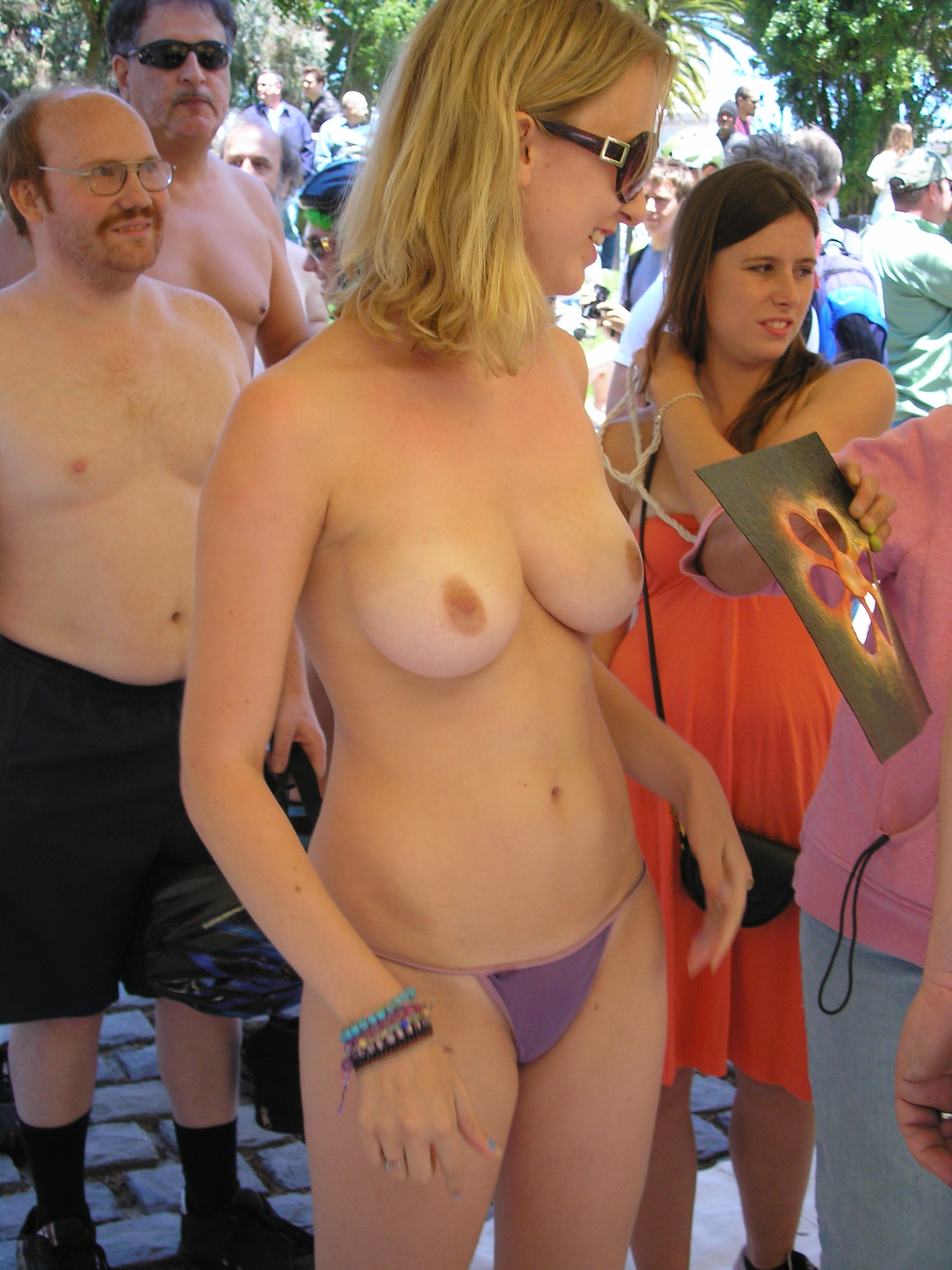
Topless woman at World Naked Bike Ride San Francisco

Female toplessness laws in the United States by state and territory Legal Illegal Vague/unknown Questionable legality

In the United States, individual states have primary jurisdiction in matters of public morality. The topfreedom movement has claimed success in a few instances in persuading some state and federal courts to overturn some state laws on the basis of sex discrimination or equal protection, arguing that a woman should be free to expose her chest (be topless) in any context in which a man can expose his. Other successful cases have been on the basis of freedom of expression in protest, or simply that exposure of breasts is not indecent (or similar terminology).

Laws and ordinances barring female toplessness are being challenged in federal courts around the nation. Each lawsuit, if it prevails at the appellate level, will legalize topfreedom in the following U.S. circuits of appeal (from west to east): 8 (California), 7 (Missouri) and 3 (Maryland). A federal lawsuit in the 7th Circuit (Illinois), was lost at the appellate level and the petition for review by the U.S. Supreme Court was denied. A preliminary injunction in a federal lawsuit in the 10th Circuit (Colorado), was won at the appellate level. In September 2018, after spending over $300,000, Fort Collins decided to stop defending their ordinance and repeal it. That effectively gave females of all ages the right to go topless wherever males can in the jurisdiction of the 10th Circuit (Wyoming, Utah, Colorado, New Mexico, Kansas and Oklahoma states as well as all counties and cities therein).

== Topless freedom by state ==
=== California ===
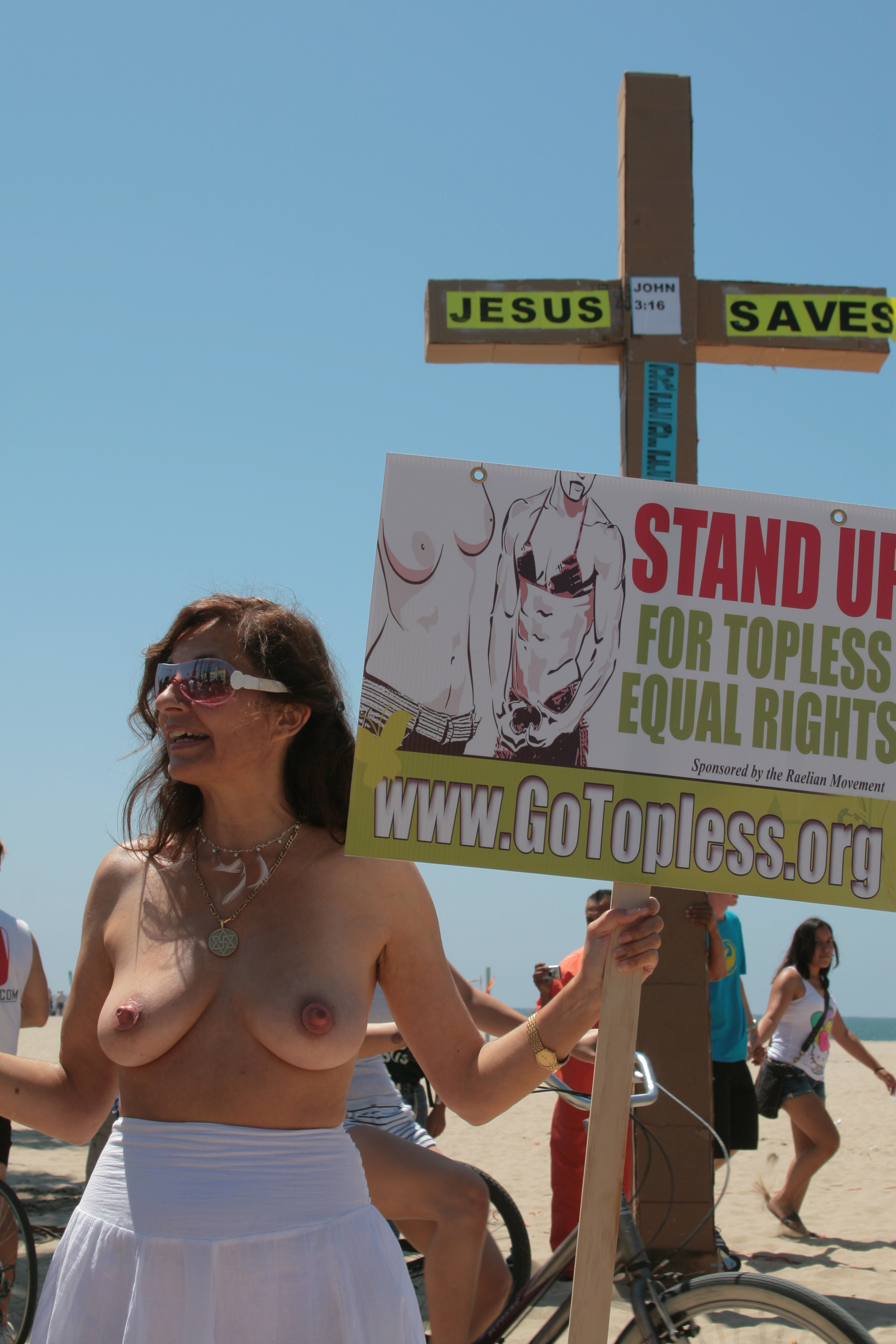
Go Topless Day protester in California, 2011

From 1947 until 1971, women were banned from bartending in California unless they were the bar's owner or were married to the bar's owner. The case overturning this law was Sail’er Inn, Inc. v. Kirby, decided by the Supreme Court of California; it overturned the law but added a new provision banning women from tending bar topless.

Currently, state law allows public nudity that is neither lewd nor offensive.

San Francisco allows public female toplessness, although public nudity is banned as of February 2012. Women cannot be topless in San Francisco parks without advance permission from the city. A popular spot for female toplessness in San Francisco is Baker Beach, a nude beach located in the Presidio neighborhood.

In Berkeley it is a misdemeanor or infraction for a woman to expose "any portion of the breast at or below the areola".

Oakland's dress law says that women cannot wear "any type of clothing so that any portion of such part of the breast may be observed".

San Jose bars anything "less than completely and opaquely covered" female breasts.

In Los Angeles, UCSD graduate student Anni Ma, a "Free the Nipple" protester, was arrested for indecent exposure at a Bernie Sanders rally on March 13, 2014, when she removed masking tape covering her nipples. She has filed a federal lawsuit against the Los Angeles Police Department. Her attorney claims she was never "nude" and that California's indecent exposure law applies only to genitals, not breasts. She is also suing for constitutional violations, gender discrimination and violations of federal civil rights laws. She was topless at a Bernie Sanders campaign rally, Saturday, March 28, 2016, in Phoenix, and she was led to the back of the venue without incident.

The Venice Beach neighborhood of Los Angeles, in 1972, was home to a naturist resort that scandalized the community, attracted cameras and spurred LA to ban nudity. Venice Neighborhood Council, in 2016, moved to make the area exempt from the city's ban on topless sunbathing.

In La Jolla, a community of San Diego, female toplessness is allowed in a nude beach called Black's Beach.

=== Colorado ===
On February 22, 2017, U.S. District Judge R. Brooke Jackson granted a preliminary injunction against a Fort Collins ordinance banning female toplessness saying it likely violates the Equal Protection Clause of the Fourteenth Amendment due to gender-based discrimination. Britt Hoagland, Samantha Six and Free the Nipple – Fort Collins brought the case in May 2016. The judge wrote: the naked female breast is seen as disorderly or dangerous because society, from Renaissance paintings to Victoria's Secret commercials, has conflated female breasts with genitalia and stereotyped them as such. The irony is that by forcing women to cover up their bodies, society has made naked women's breasts something to see. As of September 2019, topfreedom is legal throughout the state due to a win in the 10th Circuit Court of Appeals.

Denver and Boulder do not distinguish between male and female toplessness.

=== Florida ===
A Florida statute about both lewdness and indecent exposure prohibits the exposure of sexual organs in a vulgar or indecent manner but does not specify if female breasts are included as sexual organs, although the right to breastfeed in public is expressly protected. However, in 1999, the Florida Fifth District Court of Appeal inferred that this exception indicates that female breasts are sexual organs, and in 1976, the Supreme Court of Florida held that a separate statute about disorderly conduct can be used to prosecute female toplessness. Furthermore, Florida courts have rejected equal protection arguments.

There is also another important factor to consider: the right of a woman to protest topless has been held to be a freedom of expression and not an equal protection issue. For example, in 2007, a Florida court acquitted a woman of indecent exposure for being topless on Daytona Beach because of the political nature of her stand, under the First Amendment right of free speech.

However, the biggest issue is that the Florida statute concerning lewdness (aforementioned above) not only adopted terms currently considered ambiguous (regarding female breasts) like "sexual organs" (biologically they are known as the "reproductive organs" of the human reproductive system, and because of this, only the genitals are generally included on this category), but also does not clearly assert if the concept of public nudity (including female toplessness) is (or not) considered by itself an act of indecent exposure (if practiced in a nonsexual context and also outside of official places already designated for nudity). And considering that the statute only criminalizes "the exposure of sexual organs" also "in a vulgar or indecent manner", people can interpret that "if it is not explicitly prohibited to simply be naked (or topless) in Florida in the absence of any sexual context, then it is not illegal to practice both naturism and female toplessness statewide".

Furthermore, the Florida courts' decisions (also aforementioned above) did not impede that both female toplessness and naturism (the latter in a smaller scale) continued to be commonly practiced (and tolerated) in some regions throughout the state for many years, and although there are only a few known public places in Florida where female toplessness is officially allowed (especially Haulover Beach, a nude beach located at Haulover Park, in Bal Harbour), topless bathing is tolerated on South Beach, along with a number of hotel pools in Miami Beach.

=== Idaho ===
Toplessness is illegal in the state of Idaho per house bill 270, passed in 2025. It outlaws female breasts, transgender female breasts, and male transgender breasts.

Confusingly, the state statute expressly provides that breastfeeding and pumping do not constitute indecent exposure.

=== Illinois ===
The state of Illinois does not explicitly ban toplessness, and its state constitution has included an equal rights amendment since 1970 that prohibits discrimination based on gender. Some municipalities in the state have enacted ordinances that ban female toplessness.

Sonoko Tagami, a GoTopless activist, was ticketed for toplessness based on a Chicago city ordinance and fined $100 plus $40 in fees. She filed a federal lawsuit challenging the ordinance, but the trial judge dismissed the case without a trial. She then appealed the dismissal to the United States Court of Appeals for the Seventh Circuit. The appeal was heard by a three-judge panel on November 1, 2016. On November 8, 2017, a divided three-judge panel upheld Chicago's ban on female topfreedom two to one. On March 12, 2018, Tagami petitioned to appeal her loss before the United States Supreme Court. On April 16, 2018, her petition was denied.

=== Indiana ===
Indiana is one of two states that explicitly ban female toplessness by law.

=== Kansas ===
As of September 2019, topfreedom is legal throughout the state due to a win in the 10th Circuit Court of Appeals. The City of Manhattan amended its city code to allow female toplessness. But topless women can still run afoul of the state's lewd and lascivious behavior law.

=== Maine ===
In 2010 women marched topless in Portland, Maine to protest against what they saw as a social double standard regarding male and female nudity, specifically the right to public toplessness. Police in Portland did not prevent the march, as nudity is illegal in Maine only if genitals are displayed.

=== Maryland ===
On May 20, 2017, Captain Butch Arbin, head of the Ocean City Beach Patrol, instructed workers to document complaints of toplessness, but not approach topless women, even if the complainants requested it. Arbin changed the beach patrol's policy since the Maryland Attorney General has not released an opinion about female public toplessness in response to a formal request last year by a female resident and a topfree advocate who uses the pseudonym "Chelsea Covington." In response, on June 10, 2017, the town held an emergency meeting and passed Emergency Ordinance 2017–10, which made it unlawful for all females of all ages to be bare-chested in public, for purposes other than breastfeeding, in the same locations where it is lawful for males to be bare-chested. Violations of the ordinance will result in a $1,000 fine.

On January 16, 2018, Chelsea C. Eline, and four other women filed a federal lawsuit against Ocean City seeking preliminary and permanent injunctive relief. On December 20, 2018, U.S. District Judge James K. Bredar denied the preliminary injunction request. On April 7, 2020, Judge Bredar ruled on a motion for summary judgment that the city's ban on female toplessness was constitutional, noting “[t]he Court finds that protecting the public sensibilities from the public display of areas of the body traditionally viewed as erogenous zones — including female, but not male, breasts — is an important government objective.” “Whether or not society should differentiate between male and female breasts is a separate inquiry from whether it is constitutional to do so” (emphasis in original). Bredar said his decision is consistent with past rulings from the U.S. Court of Appeals for the 4th Circuit, which reviews appeals from Maryland. The Supreme Court, he noted, has also maintained that physical differences between men and women — as opposed to stereotypes about men and women — can provide a valid basis for laws that treat men and women differently. But Bredar also said “[t]his Court questions whether laws which distinguish between men and women based on ‘public sensibilities’ can survive indefinitely. Such amorphous concepts are vulnerable to prejudice and stereotypes grounded more in fear than in reality.”

=== Massachusetts ===
In December 2007, 50 residents of Pittsfield, Massachusetts petitioned the City Council requesting a segregated beach for topless sunbathing by both men and women. The petition was rejected by the council, with the Mayor calling it "unacceptable and unnecessary". Proponents of topless sunbathing vowed to continue their fight. In 2010, 200 residents of Pittsfield placed a question on the ballot asking whether State laws should be clarified to allow topless sunbathing equally for both men and women. The proposal was defeated 2,934 to 6,855. On May 3, 2022, the government of Nantucket decided to approve an amendment which allows the practice of female toplessness in all public and private beaches of the town (based on the principle of gender equality). The proposal was approved by Attorney General Maura Healey on December 6, 2022.

=== Michigan ===
In 2020, the city of East Lansing, Michigan amended its disorderly conduct laws to remove a clause specifically prohibiting women from exposing their breasts.

=== Minnesota ===
It is legal for anyone in Minnesota to be topless. However, the law is ambiguous because lewd exposure is considered illegal. On November 18, 2020, the Minneapolis Park and Recreation Board voted to allow anyone to go topless in the city's parks without being ticketed. In 2025, the Supreme Court of Minnesota ruled that a woman exposing her breasts in public is not inherently 'lewd' if done in a non-sexual context.

=== Missouri ===
On October 26, 2015, the ACLU of Missouri, on behalf of Jessica Lawson and Amber Hutchison, representing "Free the Nipple—Springfield Residents Promoting Equality", filed suit against the City of Springfield over its anti-topless ordinance in the District Court for the Western District of Missouri of the United States Court of Appeals for the Eighth Circuit. On January 22, 2016, the court granted a preliminary injunction barring the enforcement of the ordinance. On October 5, 2017, a federal judge upheld Springfield's ordinance that requires a woman, but not a man, to completely cover their areola with an opaque material. On May 6, 2019, the Eighth Circuit court of appeals affirmed the district court's decision.

=== Nebraska ===
The City of Lincoln has an ordinance prohibiting women from being topless.

=== New Hampshire ===
In February 2016, a judge dismissed a case against two female "Free the Nipple" activists, Heidi Lilley and Barbara MacKinnon, who were cited for being topless at Gilford beach. Because the judge decided "the town lacked authority for a prosecution because there is no state law that prohibits the exposure of female breasts in public," and the town "lacked authority for a criminal prosecution that's neither prohibited by the criminal code nor by statute," a bill to ban women from exposing their nipples in public was introduced. The bill would make it a misdemeanor for women to show their breasts or nipples in public with "reckless disregard" for whether it would offend someone. The New Hampshire chapter of the ACLU opposed the bill. On March 9, 2016, the proposed ban legislation was defeated. On February 8, 2019, the New Hampshire supreme court, in a 3 to 2 decision, ruled that the city of Laconia's ordinance does not discriminate on the basis of gender or violate the women's right to free speech. The women appealed to the U.S. Supreme Court, but their appeal was denied.

=== New Jersey ===
In 2008, Phoenix Feeley (aka Jill Coccaro) was charged with violating an ordinance prohibiting public nudity in Spring Lake, New Jersey. She appealed the conviction to the state appeals court, and the two-judge panel—one man, one woman—ruled against her. "Restrictions on the exposure of the female breast are supported by the important governmental interest in safeguarding the public's moral sensibilities." The court cited State of New Jersey v. Arlene Vogt (2001) as precedent. In that case, Vogt was fined after she appeared on Higbee Beach in Cape May County, New Jersey without a shirt.

In the five years since Phoenix Feeley was found guilty and fined, she appealed the case to the New Jersey state appellate court, who ruled against her. The New Jersey Supreme Court refused to hear her appeal. Legally representing herself, she then appealed to the United States Supreme Court, but it too refused to hear her appeal.

Phoenix Feeley would not pay the $816 fine, telling Judge George Pappas, "I refuse to pay the fines for an act that is legal for a man, but not legal for a woman." The judge sentenced her to 16 days but she was released after only eight for good behavior. Ron Taft, a Manhattan attorney, offered to pay her fine but Feeley refused, desiring to make a point. She went on a hunger strike. The GoTopless group organized a protest outside the jail where Feeley was held, but only two individuals attended. Taft commented, "The point is, there are guys with larger breasts than women, and sometimes they take their top off."

=== New Mexico ===
As of September 2019, topfreedom is legal throughout the state due to a win in the 10th Circuit Court of Appeals.

=== New York ===
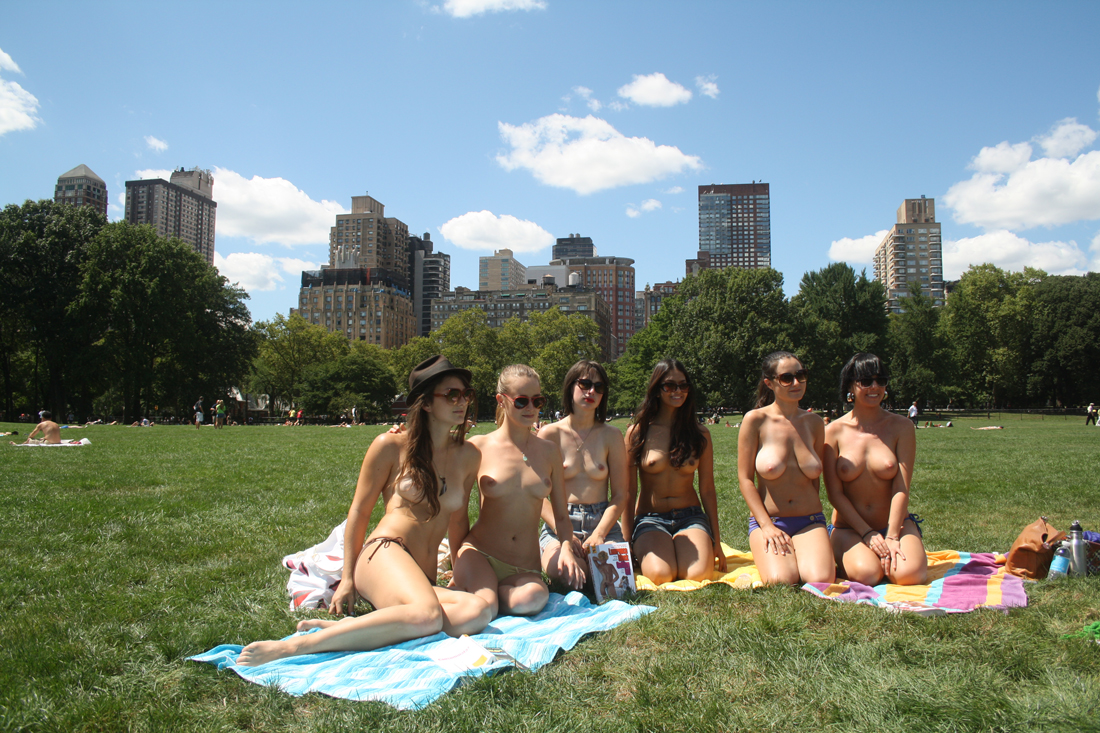
A photo from the first meeting of the Outdoor Co-ed Topless Pulp Fiction Appreciation Society in 2011

In 1986, seven women who picnicked topless were charged in Rochester, New York with baring "that portion of the breast which is below the top of the areola". That law had originally been enacted to discourage 'topless' waitresses. The women were initially convicted, but on appeal two of the women's charges were reversed by the New York State Court of Appeals in 1992 on equal protection grounds in Santorelli's case.

Phoenix Feeley of New York City, was arrested in 2005 in New York City for walking along a street without wearing a shirt. She sued the city for violating a New York State Supreme Court ruling in Santorelli's case which had declared that women can go topless in public. The city finally paid $29,000 to settle her lawsuit. The Outdoor Co-ed Topless Pulp Fiction Appreciation Society from 2011 to 2021 organized regular gatherings around New York City of women who read books in public while topless. The objective of the group, besides enjoying the sun and book reading, was to create awareness that New York law allows toplessness in public and to change social attitudes to the exposure of breasts. Although participation was very small, there was no harassment of the participants either by the police or the public. The Topless New York series, created by an anonymous New York City photographer in 2007, is another effort to raise awareness of women's topless rights in New York State, and normalize the exercise of those rights, by publishing photographs of women topless in public all over New York City and other areas of New York State.

Holly Van Voast, a Bronx photographer and performance artist, was detained, arrested or issued summonses 10 times during 2011 and 2012. Among other places, she went topless on the Staten Island Ferry, at the Oyster Bar in Grand Central Terminal, in front of an elementary school, on a train, and outside a Hooters restaurant. After her arrest in front of the Hooters, police officers took her to a hospital for a psychiatric evaluation. On October 11, 2011, she appeared in the Midtown Community Court and promptly removed her top, baring her breasts, in front of the judge. All the charges were dismissed. Van Voast filed a federal lawsuit on May 15 against the city and the police department.

In February 2013, the New York City Police Department issued a command to all its officers through their daily roll call. It reminded officers that they are not to cite or arrest a woman for public lewdness, indecent exposure or any other section of the Penal Law for "simply exposing their breasts in public."

In 2015, GoTopless organized demonstrations to protest against the legal and public attitude to the inequality in New York City.

=== Ohio ===
Ohio law forbids public exposure of "private parts". However, state courts have ruled that "breasts" are not private parts.

=== Oklahoma ===
Despite the 10 Circuit's ruling that women must be treated equally to men, Oklahoma Attorney General Mike Hunter claims it does not automatically apply to his state. State Representative Jim Olsen said only after a case works its way up Oklahoma state courts and their state Supreme Court comes to the same conclusion will Oklahoma allow female toplessness.

=== Oregon ===
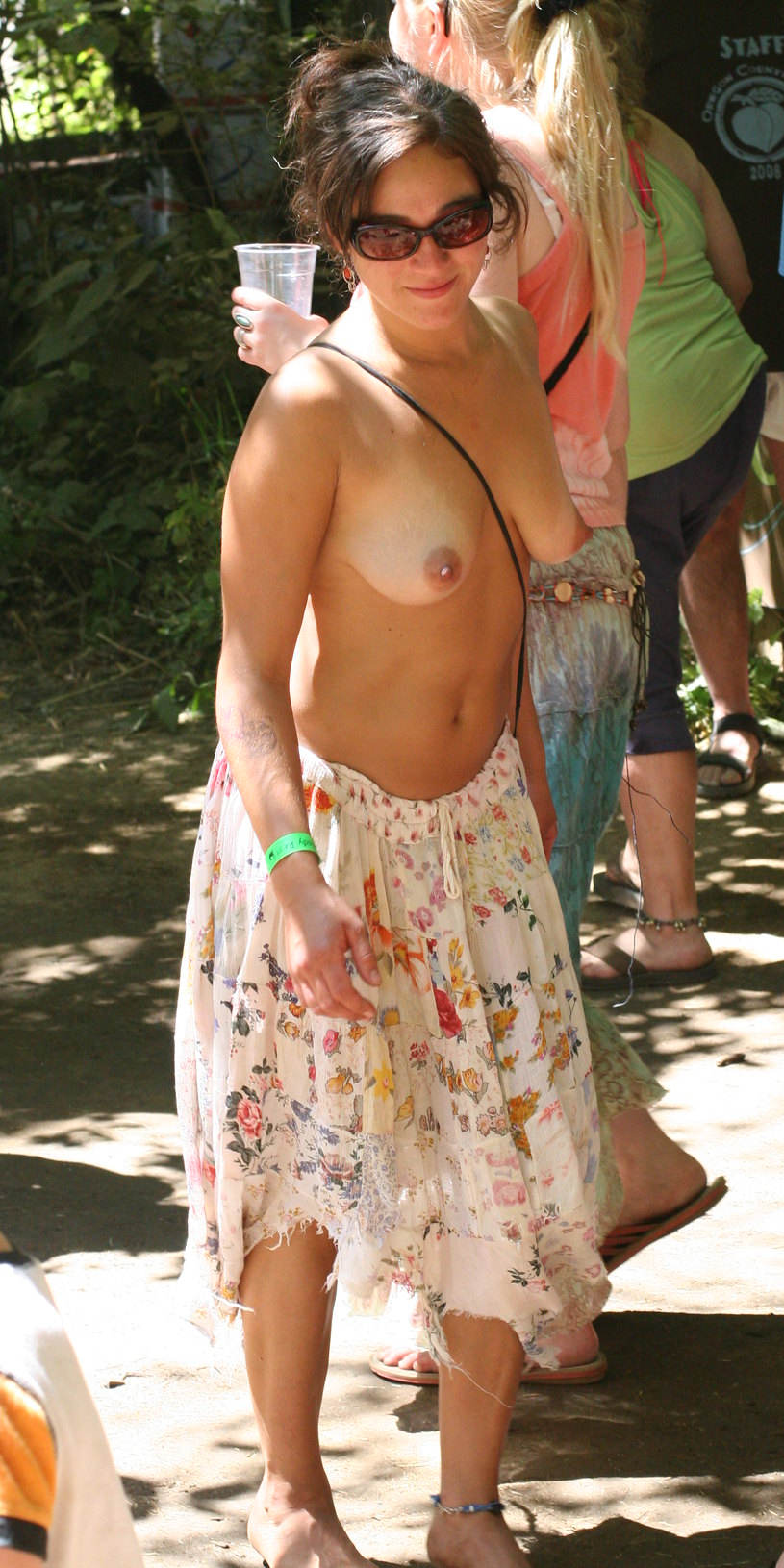
A topfree woman at the 2008 Oregon Country Fair

Oregon's indecent exposure law criminalizes only nudity that is intended to sexually arouse the public. The cities of Portland, Eugene, Ashland and Happy Valley all have local ordinances against exposing genitalia, but not against exposing female breasts.

=== Pennsylvania ===
Pennsylvania laws do not directly address the issue. Ambiguous laws have been used to prosecute female toplessness under open lewdness, indecent exposure, or disorderly conduct.

=== Tennessee ===
Tennessee is one of two states that ban female toplessness by state law.

=== Texas ===
In 1972, the Texas Equal Rights Amendment was passed into law, which Lewisville and Fort Worth have used to strike down gendered ordinances, including toplessness. However, women in Texas appearing topless in public can be charged under public nuisance laws, with the exception of Austin, the state capital, where some women sunbathe topless in Zilker Park, Barton Springs at various festivals, and at Hippie Hollow. In 2013, Lewisville's nudity laws were updated to indicate that food staff must wear "decent covering".

=== Utah ===
As of September 2019, topfreedom is legal throughout the state due to a win in the 10th Circuit Court of Appeals.

In 2020, a Utah woman was charged with lewdness when, inside her home, her stepchildren saw her topless. At the extreme she could be punished by being forced to register in the sex offender registry. Rather than go to trial and face a chance of having to register as a sex offender for 10 years, Mrs. Buchanan pled guilty to one charge of lewdness (being topless in the presence of another adult, to wit, her husband), which will be dropped if she does not commit any new crimes for a year.

=== Virginia ===
Though not legal precedent, Virginia is the only state to feature female toplessness on its flag and seal.

=== Washington ===
The Washington state laws assert public nudity by itself is not illegal (in a nonsexual context), but naturists (and topless women) can be charged with indecent exposure if they are accused of performing an act considered obscene in public while being nude (or topless) and they have the explicit intention to harm other people through this act. Breastfeeding is not considered an act of indecent exposure according to the laws.

The city of Seattle does not have any municipal laws regarding public nudity, and its policy in relation to nudity is considered more relaxed in comparison to the other cities in Washington. Nevertheless, the Washington state laws relating to nudity are enforced in Seattle, because in most cases state (or federal) laws are applied when municipal (or state, or both) laws about a determined subject do not exist. However, there are some public nudity events observed in the city throughout the year, such as the World Naked Gardening Day, as well as a few clothing-optional bike ride events, such as the World Naked Bike Ride and the Solstice Cyclists. Moreover, both female toplessness and naturism (the latter in a smaller scale) are commonly practiced (and tolerated) in the city parks (especially Magnuson Park, Washington Park Arboretum, Discovery Park and Denny-Blaine Park).

=== Wyoming ===
As of September 2019, female toplessness is legal throughout the state due to a win in the 10th Circuit Court of Appeals.

== See also ==
- Breastfeeding in public
- Female toplessness in Canada
- List of social nudity organizations
