= Umpqua =

Umpqua or Umqua may refer to:

== People ==
- Umpqua people, an indigenous people of present-day Oregon
  - Upper Umpqua language, the language of the Upper Umpqua people

== Places ==
- Fort Umpqua, the name of two former military installations in Oregon
- Umpqua, Oregon, a community
- Umpqua City, Oregon, the former name of Winchester Bay, Oregon
- Umpqua Community College
- Umpqua County, Oregon, a former county
- Umpqua Hot Springs
- Umpqua National Forest
- Umpqua River
- Umpqua River Light
- Umpqua Valley AVA, a wine growing region

== Other ==
- Umpqua Holdings Corporation (NASDAQ: UMPQ)
- 2015 Umpqua Community College shooting
