= Naked party =

Collegiate social gathering

A naked party, also known as nude party, is a party where the participants are required to be nude. The parties have become associated with college campuses and with college-aged people; they gained prominence after naked parties were organized at Brown University and Yale University. While the roots of naked parties come from the nudism movements and campus streaking, the modern "naked party" movement appears to have its roots at Brown University in the 1980s. Attendees of naked parties often report that they stop feeling awkward after just a few minutes since everyone has disrobed before entering the party and since everyone's nudity is accepted, regardless of body type. According to reports, most naked college parties are sex-free. At Brown University, the nakedness is "more of an experiment in social interaction than a sexual experience".

The event at Yale continued; in 2016 it was observed that, having begun in the 1980s, it has become an institution because of rules that enforce its non-sexual nature.

The spread of naked parties has sparked international controversy. Some students do not like the idea of their schools being associated with them. These concerns have been discussed in different works of literature, such as Tom Wolfe's I Am Charlotte Simmons and Natalie Krinsky's Chloe Does Yale. Religious groups have attempted to have nude parties banned in some municipalities. A Christianity Today column entitled "What to Say at a Naked Party" cited concerns about sexual assault and what the author considers to be objective morality.

== See also ==
- Almost Naked party
- Outdoor Co-ed Topless Pulp Fiction Appreciation Society
- List of clothing-free events
- Toga party
- Young Naturists America
