= Cape May diamonds =

Quartz pebbles found on beaches in New Jersey, US

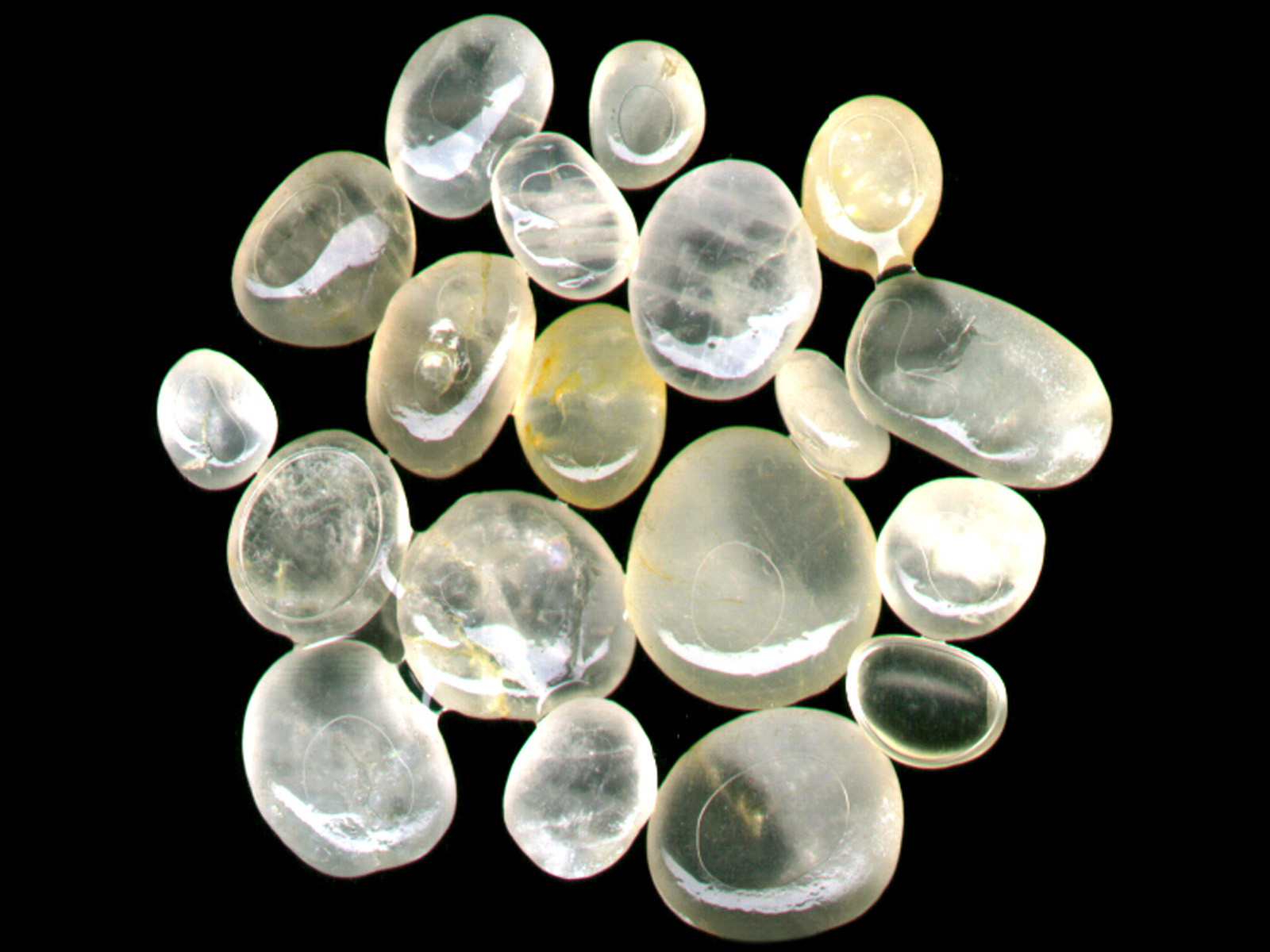
Cape May diamonds

Cape May diamonds (sometimes capitalized "Diamonds") are quartz pebbles found on the beaches of Cape May Point, New Jersey. The pebbles are sometimes collected, cut and polished to resemble diamonds, then sold locally as souvenirs. Cape May diamonds are usually collected by beach combing and are most abundant at Higbee and Sunset beaches in Cape May. Cape May diamonds range in size from the finest sand to a 3-pound-14-ounce (1.8 kg) "Cape May diamond" found in New Castle, Delaware in 1866. In the 1960s a small intact quartz crystal was found at Sunset Beach which showed almost no signs of rounding by erosion. This dispelled some early myths of their source which included a large boulder of quartz offshore.

== Origin ==
Cape May diamonds are actually pieces of quartz washed down, and worn smooth in the process, from the upper Delaware River. Apocryphally, the trip takes thousands of years. However, geologists suggest the pebbles are local in origin, washing out of nearby Pleistocene gravel deposits.

Cape May diamonds are sometimes incorrectly described as river-smoothed glass discarded by New Jersey's once-thriving glass manufacturing industry.

== Historical relevance ==
The Native American tribe called the Kechemeche resided in what is now the southern portion of Cape May County, New Jersey. Various sources attribute the Kechemeche with being the first to find Cape May diamonds and then using them as gifts or for trading with other tribes and with the newly arriving European colonists.

== See also ==
- Herkimer diamonds, another form of quartz referred to as "diamonds"
