= Outdoor Co-ed Topless Pulp Fiction Appreciation Society =

Former Topfreedom organization in New York, United States

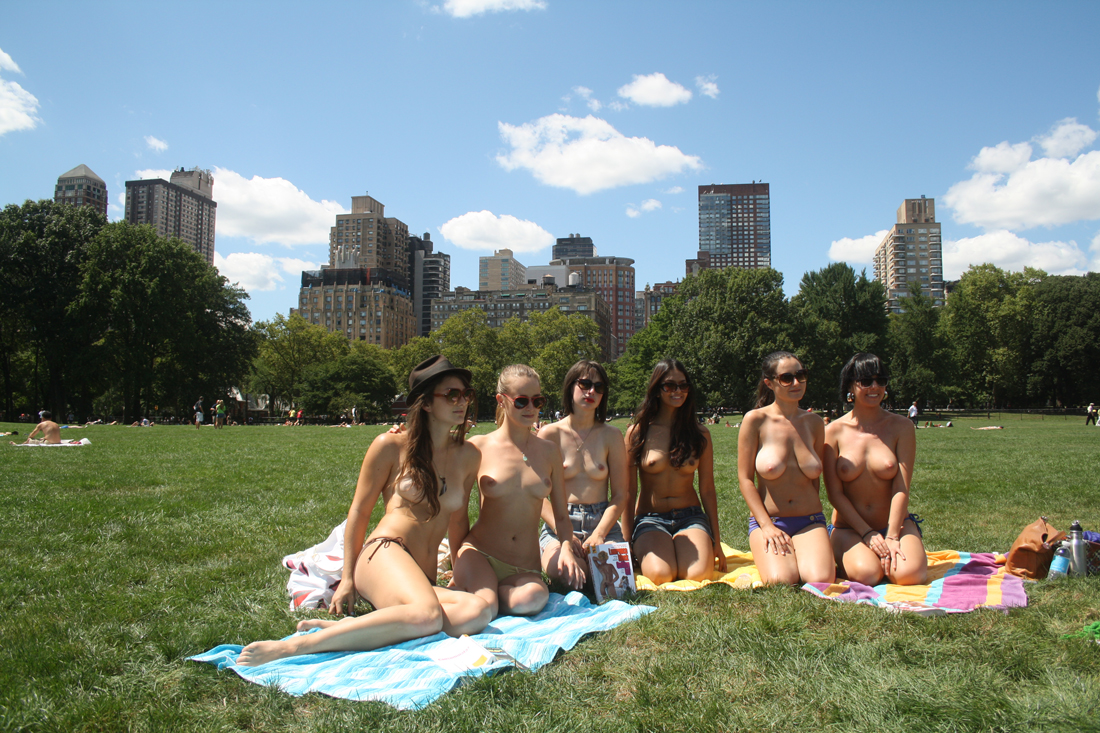
- A photo from the first meeting of the group in 2011
- Formation: 2011
- Founder: Alethea Andrews
- Purpose: recreation, activism
- Members: c. 100
- Website: toplesspulp.com (archived)

The Outdoor Co-ed Topless Pulp Fiction Appreciation Society was a group of several dozen women and a few men that had, since August 17, 2011, organized regular gatherings around New York City, meeting to read and discuss books in public while topless. The primary objective of the group, besides enjoying the sun and book reading, was to create awareness that New York law allows toplessness in public and to change social attitudes to the exposure of women's breasts. The group's blog had reported that there had been no harassment of the participants by the police and very rarely by the public.

Around March 2021, the group deleted their web site, Facebook, and Twitter accounts. The group's current status is unknown.

== Description ==
=== Membership ===
The group invited any woman (and a small number of men) to join them and had received a generally favorable reception in the media and by the public. The group had more than 100 individuals take part, but depending on the event, typically 3-15 women and one or two men attended. Some participants came only once while others were regulars.

The group actively encouraged new female members to join, inviting "open-minded, free-thinking, body-positive women whose favorite things include reading books and being naked".

=== Meeting locations and types ===
The group formerly gathered in front of the Metropolitan Museum of Art; at Madison Square; on the High Line; at Bryant Park and the New York Public Library Main Branch; in Sheep Meadow, Cedar Hill, and the Strawberry Fields in Central Park; Battery Park and the attached East River Esplanade; and Washington Square Park, among other locations.

They had also been allowed to use the roof top deck of the "nude-friendly, gay-friendly, everything-friendly" Colonial House Inn in Manhattan's Chelsea District.

The group engaged in a wide variety of topless activities, including reading in public, going to restaurants and plays, cycling around New York, visiting beaches, and having snowball fights. As well, totally nude activities including sunbathing on private rooftops and visiting spas.

=== Public reaction ===
While they had attracted a few oglers, the members chose to ignore the stares and picture taking. They emphasized that what's important was their ability to exercise their right to go topless. Most people who saw them did not pay much attention. Sometimes businessmen on a lunch break would take surreptitious photos or videos. One former member of the group reported that, "Sometimes you'll have a guy sitting a few feet away, but they eventually get bored. One of them pulled out a camera, and [the girl he was photographing] got right up in his face and took pictures of him." While in Central Park, they reported that "European tourists who take toplessness in stride" make it easier to be bare-chested.

Throughout the group's history, they did not have unfavorable interactions with the New York City Police Department, although one female officer told them during their first summer in Central Park to put their shirts on. They informed her that public toplessness was legal, and the dubious officer received confirmation on her radio that they were right. She told them to have a nice day and walked off.

=== Reading material ===
Group members generally read pulp fiction and had received advance copies of books from a number of publishers, including Hard Case Crime and the Feminist Press, as well as authors such as Elmore Leonard. The group loved "good books and sunny days and enjoying both as nearly in the altogether as the law allows".

=== Purpose ===
The former members largely prefer to remain anonymous. The founder, who uses the alias Alethea Andrews to protect her privacy, has spoken to media openly about the group: "This group is really about equal rights. When it's 90 degrees out, it's simply more comfortable not to have a sweaty shirt on—never mind a shirt and bra. People who treat women's breasts as somehow more scandalous than men's are being foolish."

The group's primary goal was to legitimize female toplessness, which although legal in New York, is not generally socially acceptable. Andrews told a reporter in 2014 that she was talking with a male friend about the law in New York that allows women to be topless anywhere a man can, but how no woman ever did. The man partnered with Andrews to found the group. He told a reporter that Andrews, a professional photographer, told him that during her travels she found people in other cultures far more comfortable with the human body than most Americans. The man, who works in the publishing business, obtained some books and the two of them organized a nude book club. Andrews believes "every woman should try toplessness at least once in her life. It's an amazing sensation."

It clearly wasn't because no woman would ever want to—when it's 90 degrees outside, who wouldn't rather be bare-chested than suffering under a shirt and bra? But most women didn't know they had this right, and those who did were often afraid to take advantage of it. So we decided to create a group to combat that ignorance and fear. We made it a book club because we loved books and loved hanging out with other people who loved books. And it's been going strong ever since.

The organizers felt that while one or two women going topless might be a target for harassment, six to ten women would feel safer.

According to a former group member who was interviewed by the Village Voice, "[m]ost of the time women are too nervous or anxious to take advantage of" New York State law that permits public toplessness. They chose reading books in public because they felt it was more innocuous than just lying around topless and would attract less attention. The group hope to remove the negative public perception of naked breasts in public as something "dirty". Members come from a variety of occupations, including bartenders, students, production assistant, personal assistant, computer scientist, an adult film actress, baristas, and burlesque dancers. Attendees have ranged in age from 17 to 44.

While the primary activity of the group was events promoting legally-permitted toplessness in New York, the group also promoted full nudity and sexual expression where legal and appropriate. The group was very careful to understand and follow the law. Fully nude activities typically took place on private rooftops.

On Twitter the group participated in advocacy for body-positivity and body-freedom, including the Free the Nipple campaign, as well as sharing and promoting full female nudity.

The first explicit mention of sexual activity in the blog was in August 2017.

How many of us had ever masturbated in a group before? Not many. But we're open-minded and very much pro-orgasm and sex-positive, so we decided we'd give it a try.

— On Sharing Orgasm, The Outdoor Co-ed Topless Pulp Fiction Appreciation Society

== Nude theatrical productions ==
=== All-female production of The Tempest ===
In May 2016 in Central Park, and September 2016 in Prospect Park, the Society performed a version of Shakespeare's play The Tempest with an all-female cast and incorporating full nudity and body painting. The Society took advantage of the fact that full nudity is legal in public in New York when "performing in an artistic performance".

The production, co-directed by Alice Mottola and Pitr Strait, was widely reported upon and well received.

=== All-male production of Hamlet ===
Torn Out Theatre presented a version of Hamlet with an all-male cast, and including full nudity, in August 2017 in Prospect Park and in September 2017 in Central Park. Actor Jake Austin Robertson stated in a New York Daily News interview "I hope that audiences will push past the shock of nakedness on stage, and see what it tells us about Hamlet." Other articles focused on the body-positive, body-acceptance goals of the performance.

== Relevant law ==
It has been legal for women in New York State to appear in public without a top "for noncommercial activity" since July 7, 1992. The New York State Court of Appeals ruled on that day that Ramona Santorelli and Mary Lou Schloss were not guilty of violating Penal Law § 245.01. (Note: At the time, Penal Law § 245.01 read: "A person is guilty of exposure if he appears in a public place in such a manner that the private or intimate parts of his body are unclothed or exposed. For purposes of this section, the private or intimate parts of a female person shall include that portion of the breast which is below the top of the areola. This section shall not apply to the breastfeeding of infants or to any person entertaining or performing in a play, exhibition, show or entertainment." It has since been amended.) The women and five others (Nikki Craft, Kathleen Reilly, Deborah Seymour, Elsie Jo Tooley, and Lynn Zicari) were originally cited in 1986 when the women had a picnic in a Rochester park, during which they all bared "that portion of the breast which is below the top of the areola". That law had originally been enacted to discourage 'topless' waitresses.

Santorelli and Schloss successfully argued that the law was "discriminatory on its face since it defines 'private or intimate parts' of a woman's but not a man's body as including a specific part of the breast." The NY Court of Appeals (the highest court of the State) ruled in favor of the two women. In their ruling, the two judges wrote:

[Defendants] contend that to the extent that many in our society may regard the uncovered female breast with a prurient interest that is not similarly aroused by the male equivalent ..., that perception cannot serve as a justification for differential treatment because it is itself a suspect cultural artifact rooted in centuries of prejudice and bias toward women. ... the concept of "public sensibility" itself, when used in these contexts, may be nothing more than a reflection of commonly held preconceptions and biases. One of the most important purposes to be served by the equal protection clause is to ensure that "public sensibilities" grounded in prejudice and unexamined stereotypes do not become enshrined as part of the official policy of government ... The mere fact that the statute's aim is the protection of "public sensibilities" is not sufficient to satisfy the state's burden of showing an "exceedingly persuasive justification" for a classification that expressly discriminates on the basis of sex.

The court also noted in its ruling that "expert testimony at appellants' trial suggested that the enforced concealment of women's breasts reinforces cultural obsession with them, contributes toward unhealthy attitudes about breasts by both sexes and even discourages women from breastfeeding their children."

More than 10 years later, Jill Coccaro tested the law when she went topless on Delancey Street and was arrested. She reminded the officers of the appeals court decision but was held for 10 hours. She sued the city and won $29,000 in a settlement.

=== Police action ===
In 2013, New York City police officers were formally reminded during 10 consecutive daily roll calls that they should not arrest a topless woman. The official memorandum stated that women should not be cited for "public lewdness, indecent exposure or any other section of the penal law." A woman can only be cited if her actions are lewd.

Holly Van Voast, a Bronx photographer and performance artist, cited the memorandum when she filed a suit after the police detained, arrested or issued summonses to her on 10 occasions during 2011 and 2012. The police department did not reveal what inspired the change in policy.

== See also ==
- Topfreedom
- Naked party, another type of social gatherings aimed at normalizing nudity
