= Female toplessness in Canada =

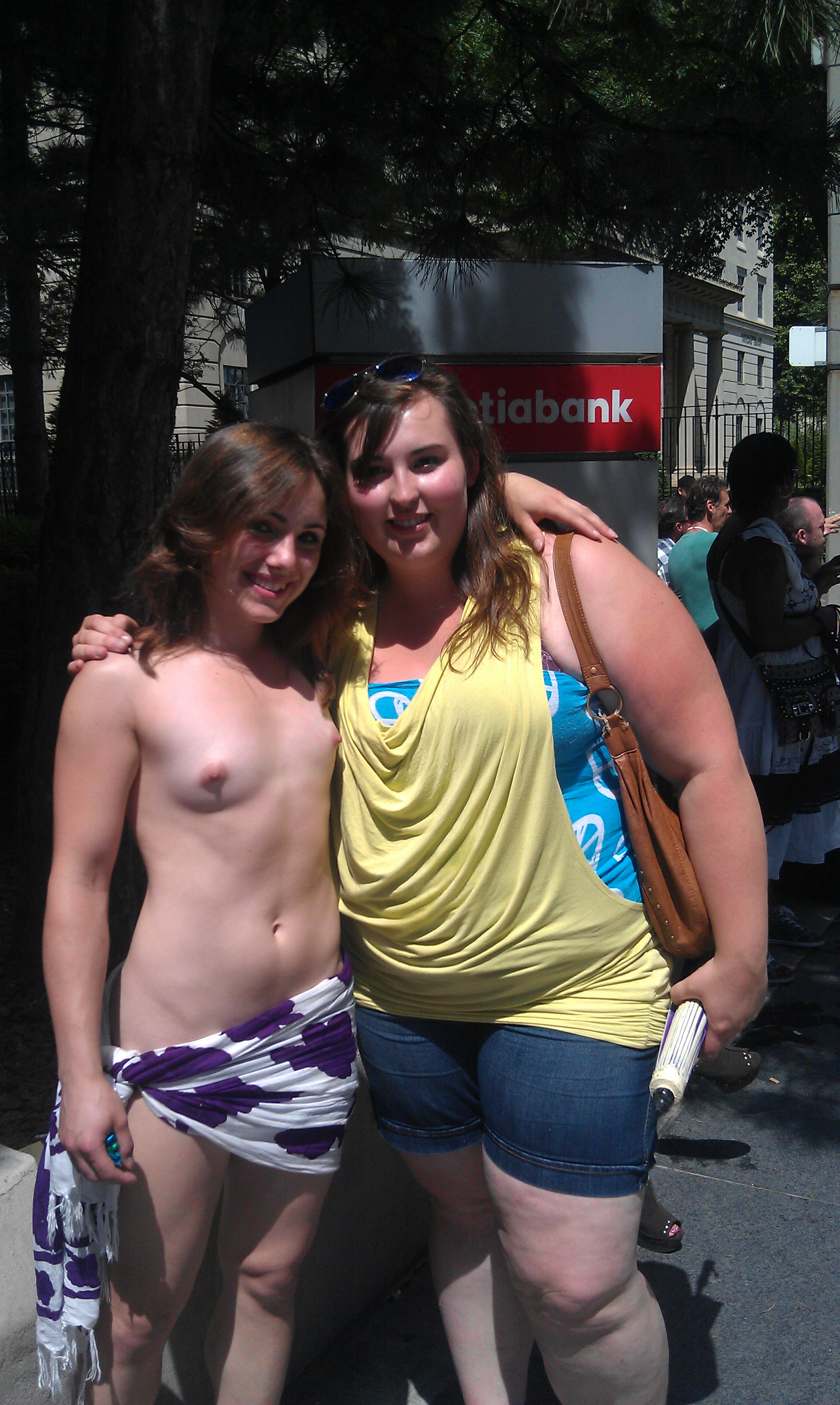
A topless woman at the 2011 Pride Toronto

In Canada, topfreedom has primarily been an attempt to combat the interpretation of indecency laws that considered a woman's breasts to be indecent, and therefore their exhibition in public an offence. In British Columbia, it is a historical issue dating back to the 1930s and the public protests against the materialistic lifestyle held by the radical religious sect of the Freedomites, whose pacifist beliefs led to their exodus from Russia to Canada at the end of the 19th century. The Svobodniki became famous for their public nudity: primarily for their nude marches in public and the acts of arson committed also in the nude.

== Law ==
In Canada, the law on public decency is found in sections 173 and 174 of the Criminal Code. However, what constitutes an indecent act is not defined and is open to interpretation by the courts.

In 1991, toplessness as an indecent act was challenged in Guelph, Ontario, by Gwen Jacob, who removed her shirt and was charged with indecency. Part of her defence was the double standards between men and women. Although she was convicted, this was overturned by the Court of Appeal. This case determined that being topless is not indecent within the meaning of the Criminal Code. However, it did not establish any constitutional right of equality. This case subsequently led to the acquittal of British Columbia and Saskatchewan women who faced similar charges. Although each province and territory reserves its right to interpret the law as it pleases, the Ontario case has proved influential. Since the matter has not been determined by the Supreme Court of Canada, it is still possible that a woman could be convicted elsewhere in Canada. Still, the interpretation of moral law in Canada has become increasingly liberalized.

== Ontario ==
Topfreedom is allowed in Ontario, set by the precedent in the case of Gwen Jacob. The acting executive director of Municipal Licensing and Standards said that while "there's no bylaw that governs toplessness," "it is legal for women to go topless on the streets of Toronto," according to a National Post article. He added that parks require clothing, except, for example, the clothing optional Hanlan's Point Beach.

=== Gwen Jacob ===
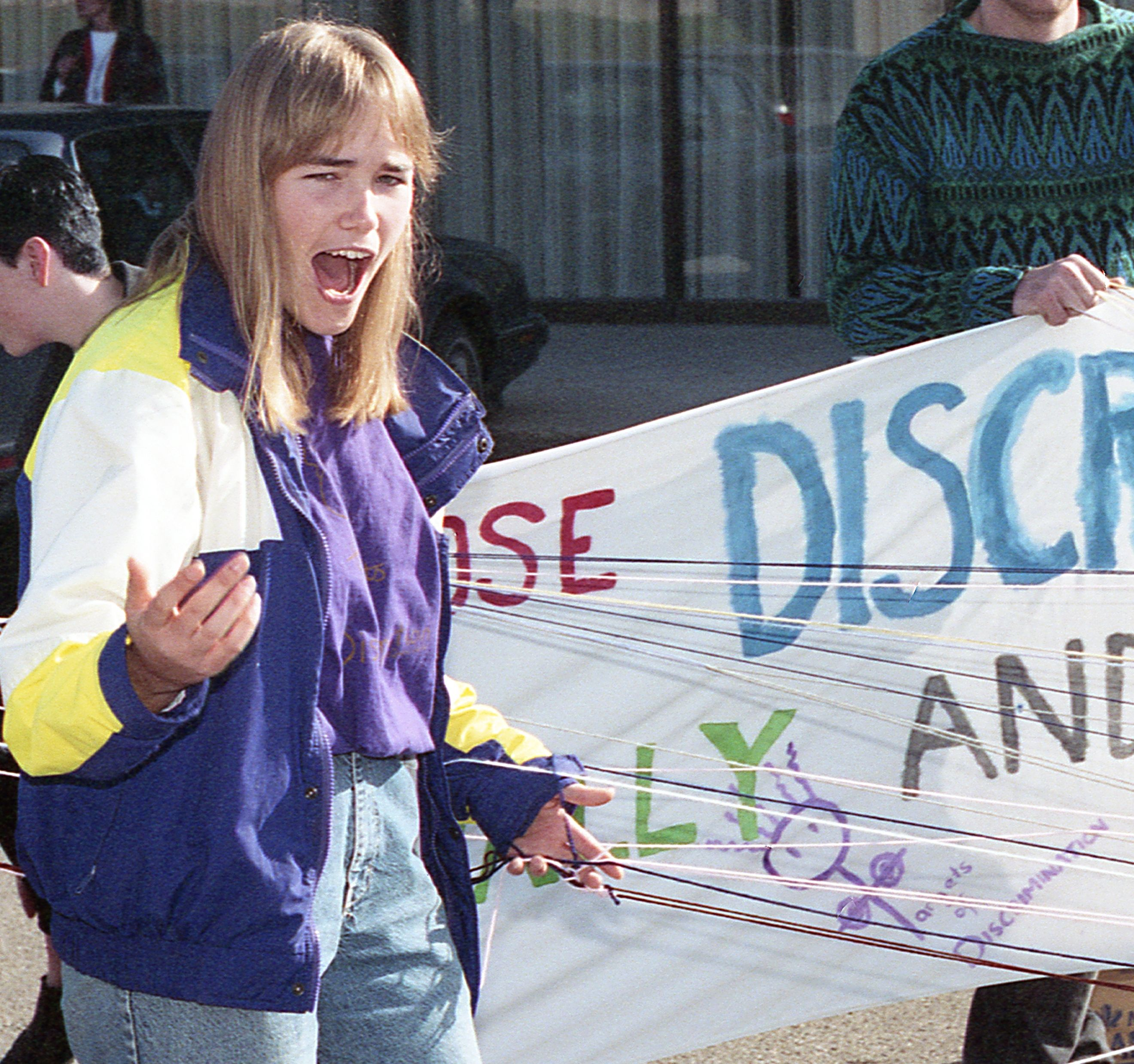
Gwen Jacob – topfree rights activist – outside court in Guelph, 1991

On July 19, 1991, a sweltering and humid day, Gwen Jacob, a University of Guelph student, was arrested after walking down a street in Guelph, Ontario while topless after removing her shirt when the temperature was 33 °C (91 °F) and was charged with indecency under Section 173(1)(a) of the Criminal Code. Police stated that they acted following a complaint from a woman upset that one of her children had seen Jacob topless.

Jacob stated she did it because men were doing it, and she wanted to draw attention to the double standard. She was found guilty and fined $75. In her defence, she argued that breasts were merely fatty tissue. In finding her guilty, the judge stated that breasts were "part of the female body that is sexually stimulating to men both by sight and touch", and therefore should not be exposed. She appealed, but her appeal was dismissed by the Ontario Court (General Division), and she further appealed to the Ontario Court of Appeal.

In the meantime, protests against Jacob's arrest and conviction led to further charges against others, in particular R. v. Arnold but in this case McGowan P.C.J. applied the test of community standard of tolerance, following Butler, stating that the action of being topless caused no harm and thus did not exceed community standards of tolerance. She commented, "Undoubtedly, most women would not engage in this conduct for there are many who believe that deportment of this nature is tasteless and does not enhance the cause of women. Equally undoubtedly, there are men today who cannot perceive of woman's breasts in any context other than sexual. It is important to reaffirm that the Canadian standards of tolerance test does not rely upon these attitudes for its formulation. I have no doubt that, aside from their personal opinions of this behaviour, the majority of Canadians would conclude that it is not beyond their level of tolerance."

Jacob was acquitted on December 9, 1996, by the Ontario Court of Appeal on the basis that the act of being topless is not in itself a sexual act or indecent. The court held that "there was nothing degrading or dehumanizing in what the appellant did. The scope of her activity was limited and was entirely non-commercial. No one who was offended was forced to continue looking at her", and "the community standard of tolerance when all of the relevant circumstances are taken into account" was not exceeded. Although Jacob claimed she had a constitutional right, the court did not address this.

The Ontario Government decided not to appeal the case to the Supreme Court of Canada, and thus it has remained the prevailing interpretation of the Criminal Code in Ontario. Since then, the court ruling has been tested and upheld several times. R. v. Jacob has been cited in similar decisions in other provinces and by the Supreme Court of Canada in R. v. Labaye, and is taught in criminal law courses.

The decision by the Ontario Government not to appeal to the Supreme Court was based on the likelihood that the court would not grant leave. This caused considerable public concern and municipalities' attempts to preempt the law by passing more restrictive bylaws (Uniform Law Conference of Canada 1999). The Ontario Government did contact the Federal Government regarding amending the law to make such actions clearly illegal. This was not pursued.

While the community standards test is not an immutable part of indecency jurisdiction, community tolerance is likely to be partly determined by the degree to which the public is exposed to top freedom on a regular basis. Jacob's victory is now celebrated annually in Guelph.

2011 marked the 20th anniversary of Gwen Jacob's walk, and to celebrate, some students re-enacted it.

=== Other cases ===
Another important distinction is whether the act's nature is commercial or not. In Jacob, the court stressed that it was not. In contrast, in R. v. Gowan Gowan, a sex worker, under the impression that exposing the breasts was now legal, solicited clients at an intersection, motioned to her breasts and called out, "Do you want to fuck?". She was consequently charged with and convicted of engaging in an indecent act, under the same section as in Jacob, 173 (1) (a).

In 2015, Alysha Brilla and her sisters Tameera, Nadia and Alysha Mohamed, were stopped by the police in Kitchener for cycling topless. The musician and activist filed a complaint with Waterloo Regional Police. They subsequently held a rally at Waterloo Town Square, called "Bare With Us," to educate the public about the right to go topfree with Gwen Jacob making an appearance.

=== Public parks and facilities ===
Despite this, women still faced discrimination in public facilities. In 1997, Fatima Pereira Henson was charged with trespassing for swimming topless in Cambridge, but the charges were dropped. She was then charged again, which was dropped by the crown, so the City initiated its own prosecution. Although this was also dropped, a bylaw prohibiting topfree swimming was passed. Eventually, her efforts led to a new bylaw allowing topfree swimming.

In Toronto in 2011, a Go Topless Day rally was refused a permit to meet in a park, so they marched down the streets with a police escort.

== British Columbia ==
In 2000 a similar case to Jacob's resulted in acquittal. Linda Meyer, a topfree activist inspired by the Gwen Jacob case, appeared in a number of public venues topless. A bylaw in the municipality of Maple Ridge stated, "Females over the age of 8 years shall fully cover all portions of their nipples and aureole with opaque apparel". On July 1, 1997, Linda Meyer went to the swimming pool in the bottom half of her bikini. Some parents complained, and she was charged, but the judge in this case (Justice Holmes) voided the bylaw stating, inter alia:

[55] In R. v. Jacob, supra, a woman who walked bare-breasted on a city street and then reclined topfree on the front step to her home was acquitted on appeal of committing an indecent act. The court found the baring of her breasts was not harmful to anyone. There was nothing degrading or dehumanizing in her conduct. The court noted anyone who was offended was not forced to look.

[57] I do not find in the evidence support for the view that the parks could not operate in an orderly fashion if a female were to bare her breasts in a circumstance that did not offend criminal laws of nudity. The evidence suggests the Section 3A amendment to the Park Bylaw was more a reaction to a frustration that the criminal law was not supporting the moral standards in regard to females who chose to bare their breasts in public that some Maple Ridge citizens desired.

[64] The defendant's 18A application is allowed.

In 2008 Vancouver, British Columbia, was a location of the World Naked Bike Ride.

== Alberta ==
In June 2022, the City of Edmonton's recreation website updated its swim apparel guidelines to say: "All patrons are permitted to go topless in city-operated pools if they so wish"; the change was not publicly advertised. The change finally caught media attention in February 2023, and the website has since changed its guidelines again to say: "All patrons are required to wear bathing suit bottoms, tops are a patron's choice. This swim attire guideline ensures that the City of Edmonton pools are aligned with the Alberta Human Rights Act which does not allow for discrimination based on gender, gender identity or gender expression."

Also, in February 2023, the City of Calgary issued a prepared statement stating, "In alignment with Human Rights legislation and our commitment to inclusivity, The City of Calgary wouldn't limit an individual's choice to swim topless in City-operated pools."

== Saskatchewan ==
In 1997, a 64-year-old woman, Evangeline Godron, and Kathleen Rice sunbathed topless in a Regina park and were charged for doing so. On July 22, a judge in the Provincial Court ruled that their behaviour did not violate community standards. However, she and other women then swam in a pool without a top. Again parents complained. Godron was arrested for assault because she refused to leave the pool when requested. Although she appealed this, she was unsuccessful. The case was appealed to the Supreme Court of Canada, which declined to hear it. However, this was a question of assault, not of indecency.

== Public opinion ==
A 1992 poll showed that 62% of Canadians opposed women having topfreedom, with women being more likely to be opposed. A more detailed survey was undertaken in 1998, and a detailed analysis were published by Fischtein and colleagues in 2005 (Fischtein et al. 2005). This showed context to be important; for instance, 72% opposed to toplessness being allowed on a city street, 62% in parks, and 48% on beaches. In all cases, women were more opposed to toplessness.

== Organizations ==
=== Federation of Canadian Naturists ===
The Federation of Canadian Naturists (FCN) is a member-supported, not-for-profit organization dedicated to fostering a greater understanding, acceptance and appreciation of naturism as a way of life throughout Canada. It has affiliations with Canadian naturist/nudist clubs and organizations. The FCN has a legal fund designated to help defend people who are charged with Nudity.

The FCN and the Fédération québécoise de naturisme (FQN) share Canadian membership in the International Naturist Federation (INF), which has its world headquarters in Horsching, Austria.

=== Topfree Equal Rights Association ===
The Canadian Topfree Equal Rights Association (TERA) assists women in both Canada and the United States who are prosecuted for being topless in situations whereas men are not. It does not advocate toplessness, but promotes the concept of freedom of choice of the individual woman, and the de-sexualisation of breasts. TERA is defunct as of May 29, 2023.

== See also ==
- Breastfeeding in public
- Female toplessness in the United States
- List of social nudity organizations
- Public nudity
- Toplessness

== Sources and external links ==
=== Organisations ===
- Federation of Canadian Naturists

=== Media ===
- CBC Jul 20, 2011 Women's topless court victory 20 years later
- CBC Dec. 12, 2005 Taking it all off
- Protesters inspire activist to new cause. Toronto Star November 12 2011

=== Legal ===
- Guelph's Hot Days of Summer. LexView Sept 29 1997
- Uniform Law Conference of Canada Review of the Law of Indecency and Nudity March 1999
- Mariana Valverde The Harms of Sex and the Risks of Breasts: Obscenity and Indecency in Canadian Law.Social Legal Studies 1999; 8; 181
- Arneil B. The Politics of the Breast. 12 Can. J. Women & L. 345 (2000)

=== Research ===
- Fischtein, Dayna S.; Edward S. Herold; Serge Desmarais (Fall–Winter 2005). "Canadian attitudes toward female topless behaviour: a national survey". The Canadian Journal of Human Sexuality.
