= Orient Bay =

Orient Bay Baie-Orientale
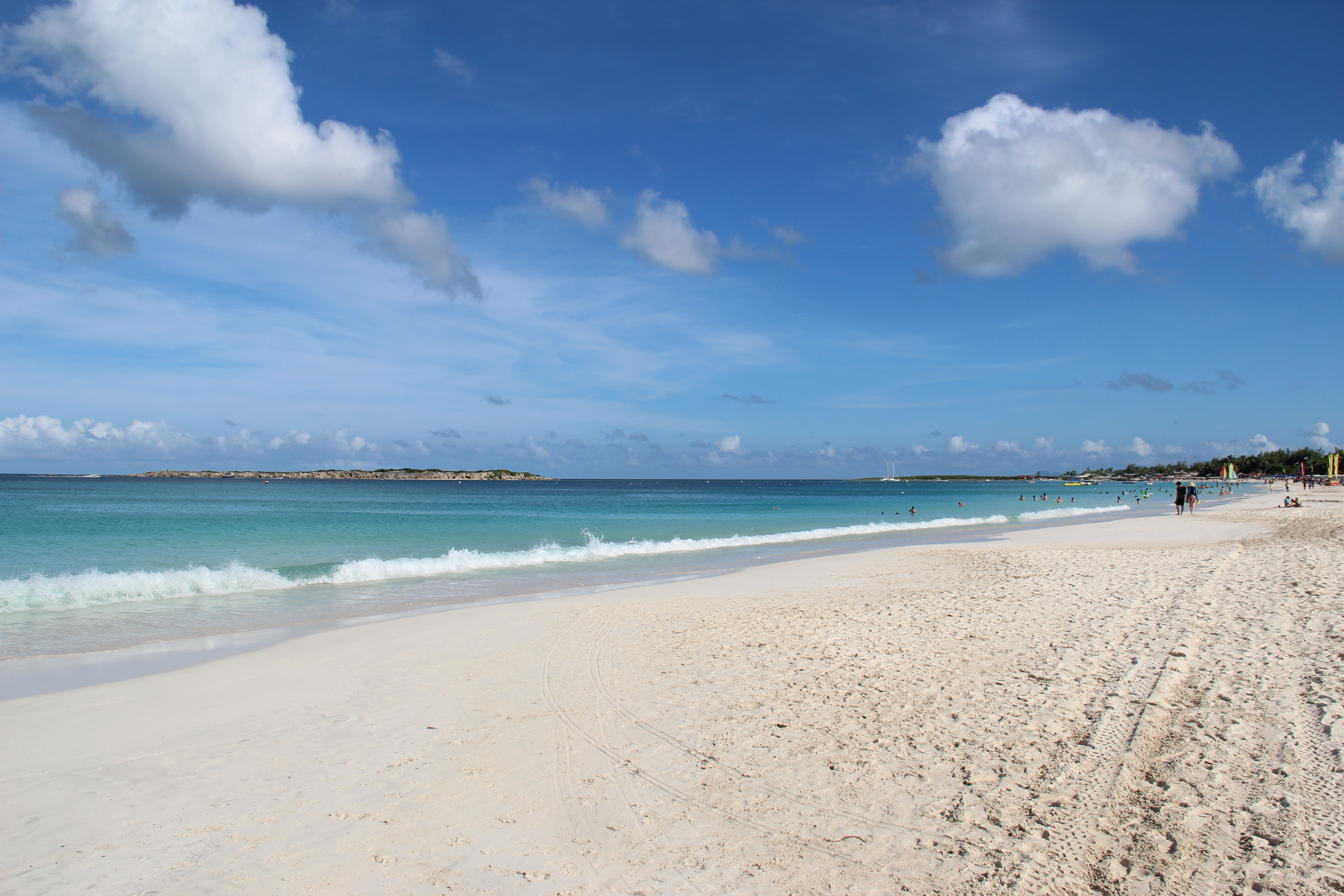
- A view of Orient Bay

- Location within Saint-Martin
- Coordinates: 18°05′13″N 63°01′19″W
- Country: France
- Overseas collectivity: Saint Martin

Orient Bay (French: Baie-Orientale, pronounced [bɛ ɔʁjɑ̃tal]) is a coastal community and beach on the French side of the island of Saint Martin in the Caribbean. It lies on the east coast of the island.

Until 1985 the area was undeveloped. The island suffered damage caused by Hurricane Luis in 1995, which was quickly repaired. The island also suffered considerable damage in 2017 by Hurricane Irma, which is slowly being repaired.

The beach at Orient Bay has become the most popular beach on the island. A section of the beach at the south end is frequented by naturists.
