= San Gregorio nude beach =

Beach in California, United States

- Beach
- Coordinates: 37.330761°N 122.400915°W
- Elevation: 0 m

San Gregorio nude beach is two miles of soft sand and tide pools, plus a lagoon, a lava tube, and the remains of a railroad on the cliffs. It is north of San Gregorio State Beach.

== Background ==
Beach-goers are predominantly gay men but also include clothed and unclothed straight couples and families. The driftwood structures on the sand are used on some days as shelter from the wind. San Gregorio has been a clothing-optional beach at least since 1966 i.e. beach-goers may or may not wear clothes at their own discretion. The parking lot and access road are privately owned and an admission fee is charged. The beach itself is public property and subject to local law.
