= Holly Van Voast =

American photographer

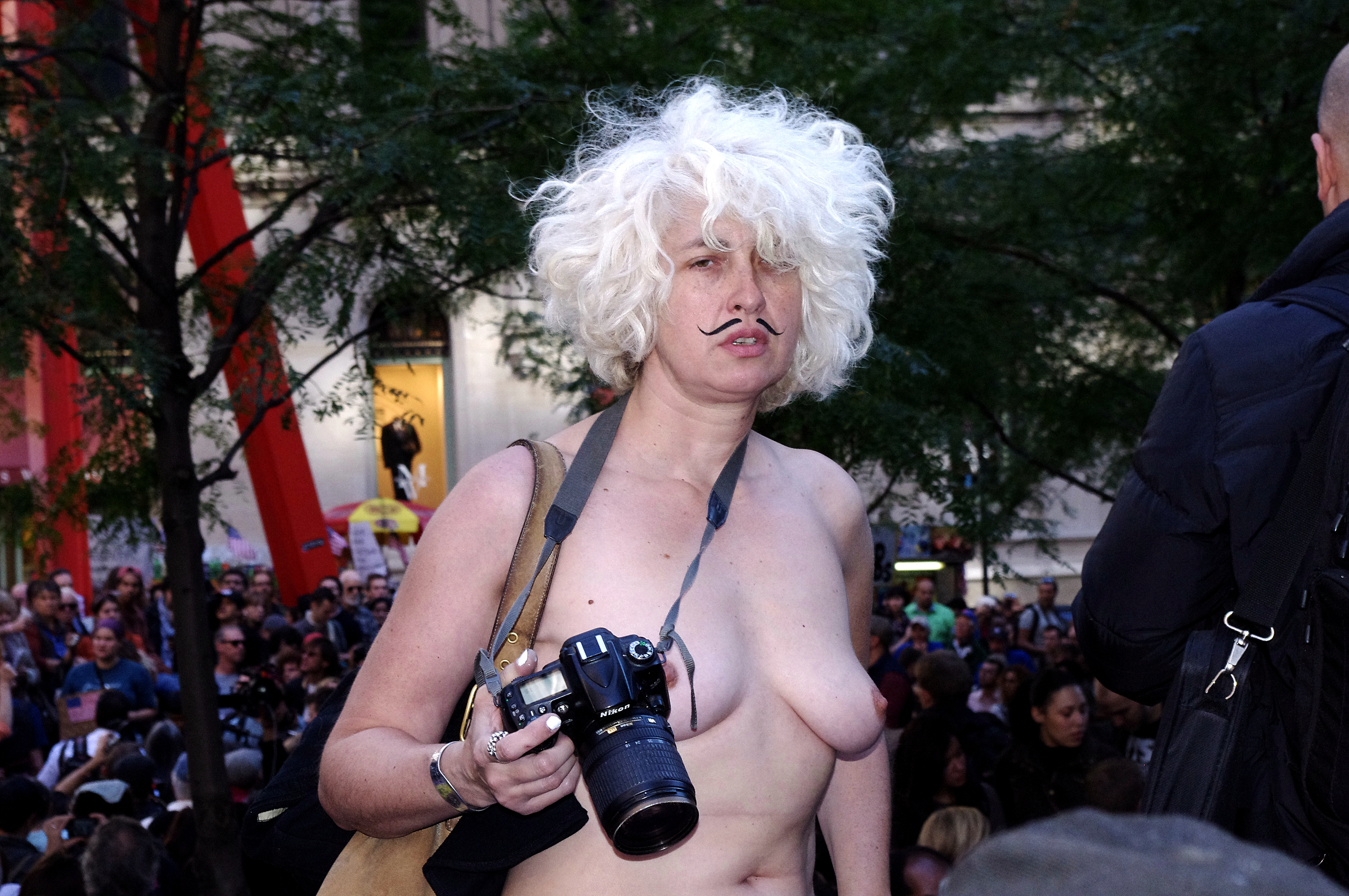
Holly Van Voast covering Occupy Wall Street in 2011

Holly Van Voast (born 1965) is an American artist, photographer, videographer, painter, and perceived topless activist mostly known for her topless appearances in public and in front of celebrities. These events tested New York City courts' interpretation of legal precedent from New York State, asserting that, on the basis of gender equality, women as well as men can walk topless in public.

== Persona ==
Holly Van Voast is an artist and journalist from the Bronx who has created an entertainment persona she calls Harvey Van Toast, actually herself topless with a painted moustache on. The character Harvey Van Toast was created, according to Van Voast, to reflect the "punk drag" nightlife performance community she has documented with her photography and videos.

== Public nudity ==
In May 2013, the New York City Police Department directed its personnel through a memo not to arrest women for "simply exposing their breasts in public", because in doing simply that, the Department stated, "women are guilty of no crime." Even if the topless display draws a lot of attention, officers are to "give a lawful order to disperse the entire crowd and take enforcement action" against those who do not comply, the memo stated. "Whether the individuals are clothed is not a factor in making a determination about whether the above-mentioned crowd conditions exist."

This directive was the result of a federal suit filed by Van Voast against the city and the police department in May 2013. The suit listed a number of past episodes in 2011 and 2012 in which the police detained, arrested or issued summonses to Van Voast, for baring her breasts at sites that included the Oyster Bar in Grand Central Terminal, in front of a Manhattan elementary school, on the A train and outside a Hooters restaurant in Midtown Manhattan. That last episode, the suit alleged, concluded with Van Voast being forcibly taken by the police to a nearby hospital for a psychiatric evaluation. The lawsuit aims to prove the NYPD's institutional ignorance of The People v. Ramona Santorelli and Mary Lou Schloss resulted in repeated violations of Van Voast's civil rights.

Each complaint against her was dismissed or dropped, Van Voast stated in her suit, because New York State Supreme Court has ruled more than two decades ago that baring one's chest in public—for noncommercial activity—is as perfectly legal for a woman as it is for a man.

Van Voast has covered New York City as topless Harvey Van Toast, exposing her ideas to passers by and celebrities alike, and calling herself "the topless paparazzo".

Van Voast maintains that she created the Harvey Van Toast character as an entertainment persona and has never presented herself as an activist. She has appeared at Go Topless Day to talk to attendees about the event's sponsor, a controversial UFO religion named Raëlism which is criticized for activities included in cult-status.

In October 2012, Van Voast appeared in court following a summons she received for exposing herself inside Grand Central Station and The Oyster Bar in August. She took her top off before judge Rita Mella and she refused to cover herself or apologize, as asked by the judge. After the judge tabled the case for later in the day, Van Voast stated that what she did "was out of line", which the judge decided was equivalent to an apology and dismissed the case, sealing it for six months, during which the defendant would have to "remain out of trouble".

On account of disrobing inside St. Patrick's Cathedral in January 2012, Van Voast was arrested for trespassing and disorderly conduct. She was also cited for cannabis possession. In February 2013, the court dismissed all charges against her. Upon exiting the courthouse, Van Voast took off her shirt and bared her breasts to photographers and passers by.

In October 2013, Van Voast was awarded a $40,000 settlement in a lawsuit against New York City and the NYPD, while her lawyers got $37,250.

== See also ==
- Public nudity
- Topfreedom
