= Higbee Beach Wildlife Management Area =

Area in Cape May County, New Jersey

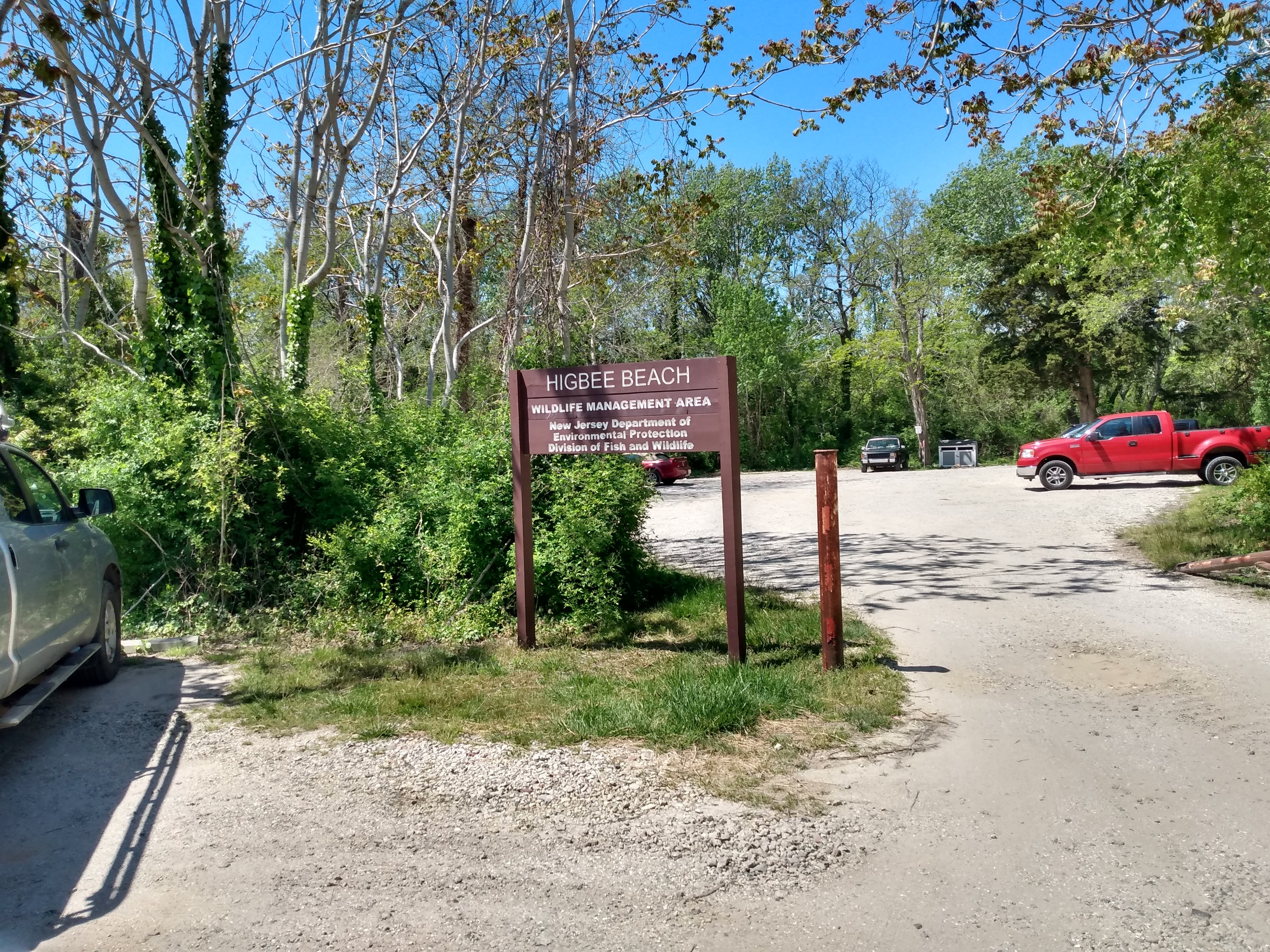
- Entrance to Higbee Beach

- Location within Cape May County, New Jersey
- Location: Lower Township, Cape May County, New Jersey
- Nearest city: West Cape May
- Coordinates: 38°57′42″N 74°57′37″W
- Area: 1,159 acres (469 ha)
- Governing body: New Jersey Division of Fish and Wildlife

Higbee Beach Wildlife Management Area is a 1,159-acre (469 ha) wildlife management area in Lower Township, Cape May County, New Jersey.

== Geography ==
Higbee Beach features a mile and a half of pristine shoreline from New England Road to Sunset Boulevard. There are six locales at the Wildlife Management Area: Signal Hill, Davey’s Lake, Pond Creek, Sassafras Island, Hidden Valley, and the Magnesite Plant. The Hidden Valley farm was a 92-acre farm that was sold to New Jersey in 1986 and incorporated in Higbee Beach. Part of the farm is used for equestrian activities. Davey's Lake, which is 300 yards long, 90 yards wide, and 12 feet deep, was dug in 1910 by the Cape May Sand Company.

== History ==
In 1807, a tavern was constructed at the mouth of the New England Creek and Delaware Bay, at the present-day location of the Cape May Canal. It was run by Thomas and Rhoda Forrest until 1823, when pilot Joseph S. Higbee purchased the land. By 1830, he had come to own a large plantation. Higbee used the spot as a landing location for passengers from Philadelphia. When he died in 1872, his brother Thomas Higbee inherited the land and operated a small hotel. He intended that the property remain in the family as long as possible, so after he died his niece Etta inherited it. When she died seven years after him, his body was dug up from the property and reinterred at Cold Spring Presbyterian Church, and the property was sold out of the family.

In the early 1900s, railroad tracks were built along the beach to support sand mining. After falling into disuse, it remained buried by the tides until reappearing in 2014 and have reappeared several time since then. With the outbreak of World War I, Bethlehem Steel president Eugene C. Grace purchased a tract along Higbee Beach in 1915 to serve as a "proving grounds" for munitions testing of artillery shells. The facility shut down shortly after the war ended. Higbee Beach was the site of a bootlegging operation during Prohibition. The large dune known as Signal Hill was named due to being a lookout point for bootleggers. In 1940, the hotel was demolished. A magnesite plant was constructed in 1941 by Dresser Industries and operated until it was demolished in 1989.

During the 1960s, Higbee Beach became known as a nude beach. For several decades naturists shared the beach with tourists and birdwatchers. In 1986, Lower Township passed an ordinance prohibiting nudity. The battle was fought in the courts, which ruled in the naturists' favor since the beach was owned by the state, Lower Township did not have the authority to ban nudity. In 1999, New Jersey passed a law against nudity due to reports of illicit sexual activity. The state legislature gave local police a $120,000 grant for enforcement, which largely curtailed nude behavior at Higbee Beach. In 2006, Lower Township police issued 20 citations for nudity at the beach.

Higbee Beach is said to be haunted by a phantom black dog, or "hell hound", that is said to be cursed by Native Americans. A strange man with a coat and hat, thought to be the ghost of Thomas Higbee, has also been spotted.

== Flora and fauna ==
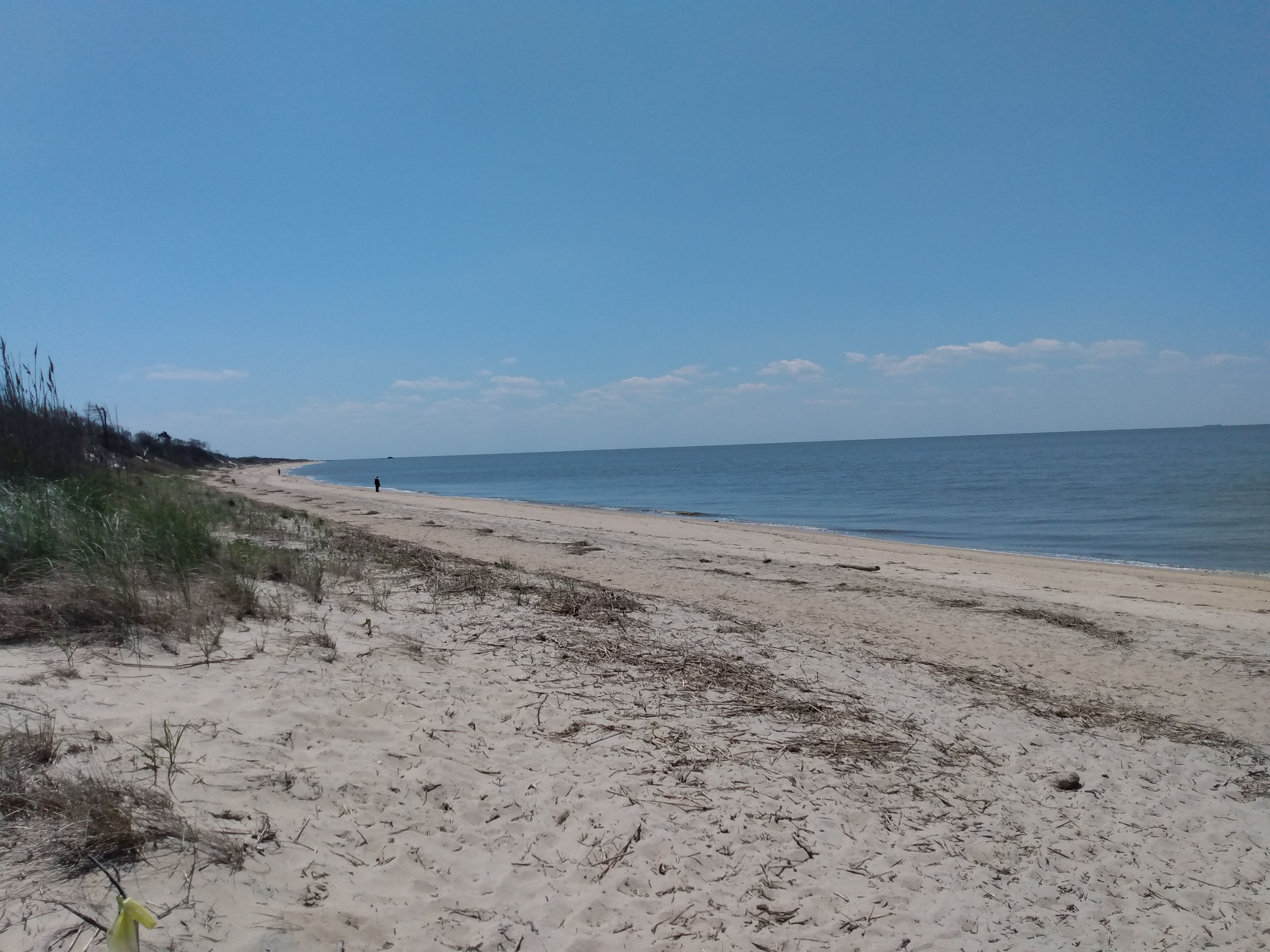
Higbee Beach in May 2020

Higbee Beach experiences one of the world's largest migrations of birds in North America. The Endangered and Nongame Species Program manages raptors and songbirds. The beach is also home to dragonflies and butterflies. During the spring and summer, several species of birds including Blue Grosbeak, Indigo Bunting, Yellow-breasted Chat, and Prairie Warbler breed at the beach. A forest comprising holly, red cedar, sassafras, persimmon, northern bayberry, scrub oak, wild black cherry, common wax myrtle and beach plum is responsible for stabilizing the dunes. The rare orchid Spiranthes odorata can be found growing at Higbee Beach.

== Recreation ==
Higbee Beach features roughly 2 miles of trails. In 1999, the Bureau of Land Management added a dune trail. Hunting is permitted starting Monday after the Six-day Firearm Deer Season every year. Higbee Beach is a popular place to find Cape May diamonds, quartz crystals rounded and polished by the sea. While swimming is officially prohibited, this is rarely enforced as there are frequently swimmers in the bay.
