= Umpqua Hot Springs =

Thermal springs in Oregon

- Toketee Hot Springs
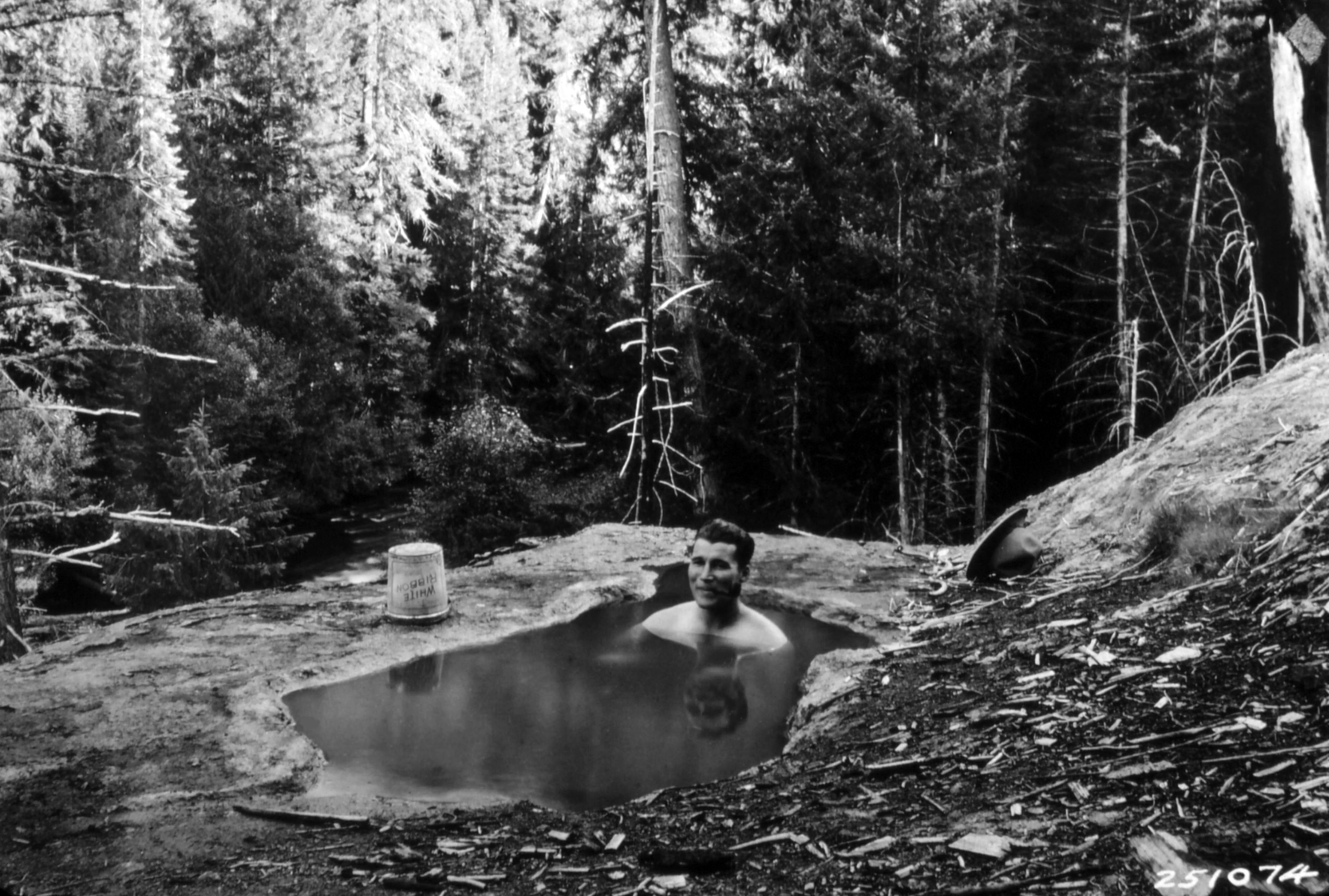
- Umpqua Hot Springs in 1930

- Location within Oregon
- Interactive map of Umpqua Hot Springs
- Coordinates: 43.295035°N 122.365873°W
- Elevation: 2,640 ft (800 m)
- Type: geothermal
- Temperature: 110 °F (43 °C) to 112 °F (44 °C)

The Umpqua Hot Springs are a group of geothermal springs located along the North Umpqua River in the U.S. state of Oregon at 2,640 feet (800 m) elevation.

The hot mineral water emerges from several sources to form a series of cascading pools. Eight pools are available for soaking, the larger having a solid rock bottom and the smaller pools have coarse sand bottoms. The larger is five by eight feet and 110 °F (43 °C), and is covered by a wooden enclosure. The upper pool is smaller but slightly warmer, measuring four by five feet and 112 °F (44 °C). Both pools are approximately two and a half feet deep. Umpqua is clothing optional. The hot springs are for day use only. The nearest camping is at Toketee Lake.

== History ==
The hot springs were historically used by at least four separate indigenous tribal groups. The springs were used for spiritual and healing purposes and were considered a no-conflict zone by the tribes. "Umpqua" means "dancing water" in the local indigenous people's language.

Archaeological evidence indicates that Indigenous people settled in the Umpqua River area at least 8,000 years before the arrival of Euro-American settlers. Native groups in the area include the Southern Molalla who spoke the Molala language, who lived in the area near the headwaters of the South Umpqua River. The Kalawatset, also known as the Lower Umpqua tribe, lived on coastal lands along the Umpqua Esturary, the Smith River and from the Siltcoos River to Tenmile Creek. They spoke a variant of the language spoken by the Coos and Siuslaw tribes. The Upper Umpqua people as well as the Cow Creek Band of the Umpqua Tribe of Indians lived along the Umpqua River.

=== Access ===
Travel 0.3-mile up the steep Umpqua Hot Springs trail #1444 to a 3'x5'x2.5' soaking pool carved in the travertine. A larger soaking pool is located 150' above the North Umpqua Wild and Scenic River, and is surrounded by a wooden open-air roof structure. There is a $5.00 use-fee for using the trail. The springs may not be accessible during winter.
