= Carol Doda =

American dancer (1937–2015)

- Doda in 1965
- Born: Carol Ann Doda; August 29, 1937; Vallejo, California, U.S.
- Died: November 9, 2015 (aged 78); San Francisco, California, U.S.
- Occupation: Topless dancer
- Children: 2

Carol Ann Doda (August 29, 1937 – November 9, 2015) was an American topless dancer based in San Francisco, California, who was active from the 1960s through the 1980s. She was the first public topless dancer in the United States.

In 1964, Doda made international news, first by dancing topless at the city's Condor Club, then by reportedly enlarging her breasts from size 34B to 44DD through silicone injections. Her breasts became known as Doda's "twin 44s" and "the new Twin Peaks of San Francisco".

== Early life ==
Carol Ann Doda was born August 29, 1937, in Vallejo, California, and grew up in San Francisco. Her mother's maiden name was Hoss. Her parents divorced in 1942 when she was four, and Doda dropped out of school and became a cocktail waitress at age 14.

== Topless entertainer ==
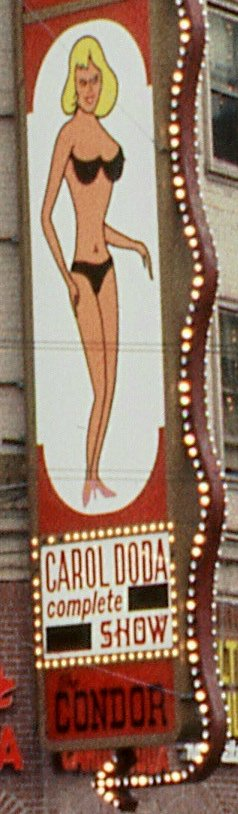
Condor Club sign in San Francisco featuring Carol Doda, 1973, with blacked-out areas (taken down 1991)

Doda attended the San Francisco Art Institute and worked as a waitress and lounge entertainer at the Condor Club, located at the corner of Broadway and Columbus in the North Beach section of San Francisco. The act began with a grand piano lowered by hydraulics through an opening in the ceiling, with Doda dancing on top of the piano. She go-go danced "The Swim" to a rock-and-roll combo headed by Bobby Freeman as her piano settled onto the stage. From the waist up, Doda imitated aquatic movements such as the front crawl. She also performed the Twist, The Frug, and the Watusi.

On June 19, 1964, when Doda was twenty-six years old, the Condor's publicist, "Big" Davy Rosenberg, gave Doda a monokini topless swimsuit designed by Rudi Gernreich. She performed topless that night, the first known entertainer of the era to do so. The act was an instant success. Two months after she started her semi-nude performances, the rest of San Francisco's Broadway went topless, followed soon after by entertainers across America. She was profiled in Tom Wolfe's 1969 book The Pump House Gang, and appeared that same year as Sally Silicone in Head, the 1968 film created by Jack Nicholson and Bob Rafelson, and featuring The Monkees. In the film, produced by Columbia Pictures, she appears in a Golden Boy parody segment with Annette Funicello, Sonny Liston, and Davy Jones.

Encouraged by her success, Doda underwent silicone injections to enlarge her breasts. Doda became renowned for her bigger bust, and was one of the first well-known performers to have her breasts artificially enlarged. She had 44 injections, a large dose of silicone, at a cost of US$1,500. Her breasts were reportedly insured for $1.5 million with Lloyd's of London.

For the topless and waterless Swim, Doda wore the bottom half of a black bikini and a net top which ended where a bathing suit generally began. She performed twelve shows nightly so the management could keep crowds moving in and out. A large illuminated sign in front of the club featured a cartoon of her with red flashing lights representing her nipples.

== Bottomless entertainer ==
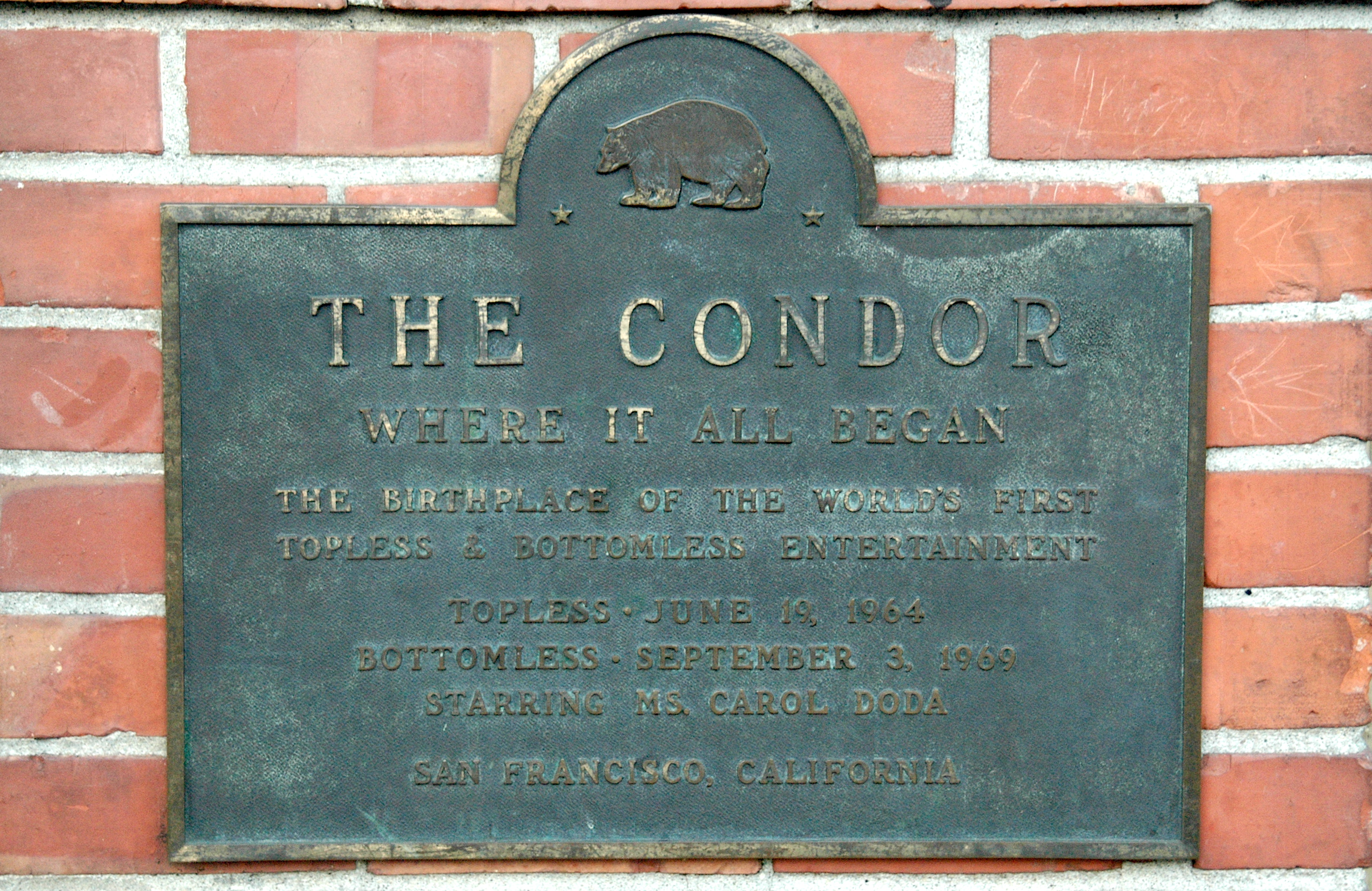
Historical marker at the original Condor Club site. Full text: "The Condor; Where it all began; The birthplace of the world's first topless & bottomless entertainment; Topless – June 19, 1964 Bottomless – September 3, 1969 Starring Ms. Carol Doda; San Francisco, California"

On September 3, 1969, Carol Doda began dancing bottomless (i.e. totally nude) at the Condor. She danced bottomless until late 1972, when the California Alcoholic Beverages Commission prohibited nude dancing in places that served alcohol.

In 1969, Doda performed with The Tac Squad, a bottomless all-girl band, at Carol Doda's at 430 Broadway in San Francisco.

== Court appearances ==
On April 22, 1965, Doda was arrested along with Pete Mattioli and Gino del Prete, owners of the Condor Club. They were cleared when two judges instructed not-guilty verdicts. Judge Friedman's memorandum to opposing attorneys reads, "Whether acts ... are lewd and dissolute depends not on any individual's interpretation or personal opinion, but on the consensus of the entire community ..." Doda and del Prete were arrested during police raids to stop bare-bosom shows in North Beach. Peter Mattioli owned the Condor Club by 1967 and Doda still appeared in shows there.

In 1969, Doda was a witness during the trial of two all-nude dancers who were arrested for "indecent exposure and lewd and dissolute conduct". The defendants were dancers at the Pink Pussy Kat in Orangevale, California. Presiding Municipal Court Judge Earl Warren Jr. moved the trial, temporarily, from the courtroom to Chuck Landis Largo club. There, Doda performed to live song and dance numbers, along with a film titled Guru You. She was cross-examined by a deputy district attorney about what she hoped to convey to audiences in her act. Doda was dressed in a red miniskirt with dark blue piping and beige boots. She responded that the movie represents "a satire of pornography ... it's to show people the humorous side of sex". Several members of the 10-man, 2-woman jury kept their smiles in check as Doda explained the 17-minute film. The deputy district attorney opposed asking her to perform, considering it irrelevant to the case. He was overruled by Warren.

== Later career ==
From the late-1960s through the late-1970s, Doda was the spokesmodel for KGSC-TV, later San Jose, California television station KICU-TV Channel 36. Filmed from the waist up and wearing clothes which amplified her physical attributes, she became known for saying "You're watching the Perfect 36 in San Jose." She would also occasionally appear on-air to do a double entendre laced editorial commentary on the issues of the day.

Doda appeared as Sadie Thompson in "Rain", at the Encore Theater SF, beginning January 1968.

In 1982 Doda was again dancing at the Condor three times a night. She performed to rock 'n' roll, blues, and ragtime. Each act was the same, with Doda appearing in a gold gown, elbow-length gloves, and a diaphanous wraparound. Her clothing was removed one piece at a time until she wore a g-string and the diaphanous wraparound. In the final portion she was attired in only the wraparound. Her small body looked slimmer without clothes, a perception which was emphasized by the dwarfing effect of her breasts. At the time she was taking dance and voice lessons, but had no definite plans for her future. Doda quit performing in December 1985.

During the 1980s, Doda performed throughout Bay Area dance night clubs with her band The Lucky Stiffs.

Doda retired from stripping in the 1980s and subsequently ran Carol Doda's Champagne and Lace Lingerie Boutique, a lingerie shop in San Francisco.

Throughout the 2000s and early 2010s, Doda performed fully clothed at several San Francisco North Beach bars and clubs, including Gino & Carlo, Amante's, and Enrico's Supper Club.

== Personal life ==
On November 9, 2015, Doda died of kidney failure at St. Luke's Hospital in San Francisco after a long stay. Doda said that she never married, but California newspapers recounted two early marriages. On July 17, 1954, at 16, she married Tommy Gene Smith of Vallejo. She gave birth to two children with Smith and had little contact with them: a daughter, Donna Smith Terzian, who predeceased her, and a son, Tom Smith. She married a second time on August 16, 1959, in Reno, Nevada, to Donald L. Sorensen. The article reporting their marriage said that the couple lived and worked at the time in Vallejo, California. It also said she had graduated from Vallejo High School.

== Recognition ==
In Yosemite National Park, Doda Dome was named after her.

Carol Doda Topless at the Condor is a documentary about the birth of topless dancing in San Francisco in 1964.

The history and impact of the Condor Club, including Doda's role in it, was described in the 2018 book Three Nights at the Condor, written by Benita Mattioli, wife of Condor owner, Peter Mattioli.

== Filmography ==
- Head (1968)
- Machine Gun McCain (1969)
- Honky Tonk Nights (1978)
