= Nutty Tarts =

Finnish art duo

The Nutty Tarts (Tärähtäneet ämmät FIN) is an art duo formed by two Finnish artists, Katriina Haikala (born 1977) and Vilma Metter (born 1977).

== Background ==
The Nutty Tarts was formed in Helsinki in 2007, with the mission of provoking public conversations that challenge the prevailing power dynamics in contemporary societies. In their creative work, Haikala and Metteri use various forms of art, such as photography, video installation and live performance, to name just a few. Their motto “Shaken not blurred” relates not only to the variety and diversity of their artistic projects but to their mission of being artistic trouble makers who want to challenge oppressive norms.

The Nutty Tarts’ most noted social art projects are Monokini 2.0 (2013-), Dystopia/Utopia (2013-) and Hairy Underwear (2014-). Their provocative and humorous artwork has received worldwide attention from the international media, including from media outlets like The Huffington Post, El País, Le Monde, Il Fotografo, Daily News (New York), Libération and Upworthy.

== Projects ==
=== Monokini 2.0 - Who says you need two ===
Monokini 2.0 is a social art project launched in 2013. Ten Finnish fashion designers, such as Mert Otsamo, Tyra Therman, Outi Pyy, participated in the Monokini 2.0 project and together designed a swimwear collection. This swimwear is targeted for women who have experienced breast cancer and mastectomies.

The collection was photographed by Finnish photographer Pinja Valja in collaboration with Haikala and Metteri and is modeled by 10 breast cancer survivors. The photographs form a collection that has been exhibited in various galleries in and outside of Finland.

Monokini 2.0 charity Catwalk Show was held in the Yrjönkatu Swimming Hall on 30 August 2014. The show was the first time that the swimwear collection was publicly showcased.

=== Dystopia/utopia ===
Dystopia/utopia is a social art project based on photography and scenario work. The project is created together with 14-17 year-olds who are at risk of becoming marginalized. Working together with Nutty tarts and American photographer Gabriel Mellan, the youngsters used photography to visualize their outlook on life through the concepts of dystopia and utopia. Together with a picture representing the present of each young participant, the dystopian and utopian images formulate a triptych.

The Dystopia/Utopia project was carried out in 2013 and 2014 with the support of Kone Foundation at the Saari Residence in Mynämäki, Finland. The project is continuing in September and October 2015 in Helsinki with funding from the Myrsky project.

=== Hairy Underwear ===
Hairy Underwear is an undergarment collection designed by the Nutty Tarts including underpants, undershirts and leggings. The collection is sold in the Hairy Underwear online webstore and shipped globally. The collection is designed to provoke discussion about suppressive norms, gender issues and the narrow idea about ideal beauty.

== Exhibitions 2013 - 2015 ==
- 2015 ”Dystopia / Utopia”, Photographic Gallery Hippolyte, Helsinki, Finland
- 2015 ”Monokini 2.0”, Finnish institute in Stockholm, Stockholm, Sweden
- 2015 ”Monokini 2.0”, Kunstplass10, Oslo, Norway
- 2014 ”Dresscode”, Spiral Art center, Tokyo, Japan
- 2014 ”Monokini 2.0”, Museum Anna Nordlander, Skellefteå, Sweden
- 2014 ”Monokini 2.0”, Finnish Museum of Photography, Helsinki, Finland
- 2013 ”Dresscode”, The Parsons New School Gallery, New York City, United States
