= Monokini 2.0 =

Social art project

Monokini 2.0 is a social art project launched in 2013. The creative leaders of the project are two Finnish artists, Katriina Haikala and Vilma Metteri, also known as the art duo The Nutty Tarts (fin. Tärähtäneet ämmät).

== Background ==
Ten Finnish fashion designers participated in the Monokini 2.0 project and together designed an haute couture swimwear collection. These swimwears are targeted for women who have experienced breast cancer and have undergone through different operations and changes and in their body, such as mastectomy.

The swimwear collection was photographed by a Finnish photographer Pinja Valja together with Haikala and Metteri. The collection is modeled by 10 breast cancer survivors who have gone through mastectomy. One of the models, miss Elina Halttunen, is also the initiator of the whole project. These photographs form a collection of 10 photographs that have been exhibited in and outside Finland.

Monokini 2.0 project calls for acceptance and respect for all kinds of human bodies and aims to widen the ideas of a beautiful body. Also, the project challenges the presumptions of what is concerned as nudity and disclosure in the Western culture.

The tag line/motto of the Monokini 2.0, "Who says you need two", condenses the message of the whole project: That women can be beautiful with one breast or with no breast at all and every woman should have the right to decide whether she wants to have breast reconstruction after mastectomy or not.

== Designers ==
- Katriina Haikala ja Vilma Metteri / The Nutty Tarts (Tärähtäneet ämmät)
- Outi Les Pyy
- Sasu Kauppi
- Elina Halttunen
- Tyra Therman
- Mert Otsamo
- Timo Rissanen
- Piia Keto ja Marjo Kuusinen / Kaksitvå

== Monokini 2.0 Catwalk Show ==
Monokini 2.0 Catwalk Show was held in Finland's oldest public swimming hall, Yrjönkatu Swimming Hall, on 30 August 2014. The fashion show was the first time the Monokini 2.0 swimwear collection was showcased in public. The catwalk models were the ones who appeared in the original photographs, women who have had mastectomy. The show featured live performances by Astrid swan, the Finnish vocal group Mamo and the synchronized swimming group of the Finnish Swimming Association. Together with the performances and the venue Monokini 2.0 Catwalk show was a one-of-a-kind event.

== Publicity ==
Monokini 2.0 project has been noticed both nationally and internationally in various medias. After the first exhibition in the Finnish Museum of Photography, Brogan Driscoll from The Huffington Post all wrote how "Bold, beautiful and empowering, the collection is one of fashion's most powerful collaborations to date."

Julija Néje from the media company Bored Panda explained how the Monokini 2.0 swimwears "help eliminate the discomfort breast cancer survivors face when they go to the beach and show us their bravery, hope and determination."

On 24 May 2014 Lady Gaga’s charity foundation "Born This Way Foundation" wrote about the Monokini 2.0 project on its Facebook page. The post gave so much global attention to the project that the official Monokini 2.0 website two times in one day.

== Exhibitions in 2014–2015 ==
- 2015 "Monokini 2.0", Finnish institute in Stockholm, Stockholm, Sweden
- 2015 "Monokini 2.0", Kunstplass 10, Oslo, Norway
- 2014 "Monokini 2.0", Museum Anna Nordlander, Skellefteå, Sweden
- 2014 "Monokini 2.0", Finnish Museum of Photography, Helsinki, Finland

== See also ==
- The Nutty Tarts
