= Monokini =

Topless swimsuit designed by Rudi Gernreich

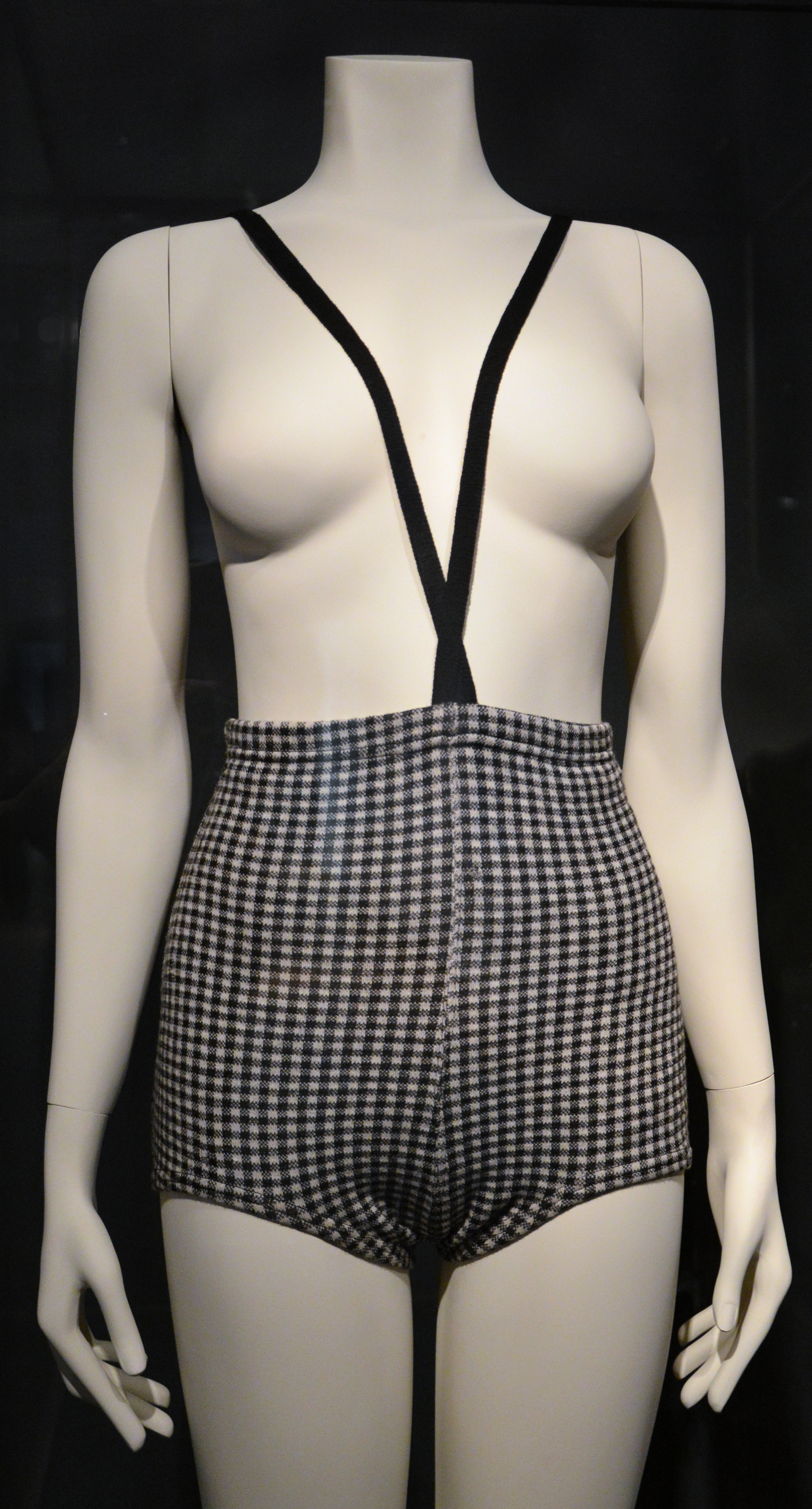
- Rudi Gernreich's original monokini design
- Designer: Rudi Gernreich
- Year: 1964
- Type: Bathing suit
- Material: wool jersey

for Life magazine, 10 July 1964
- Daphné Dayle, 1964, by Paul Schutzer
- monokini, tied behind neck, 46 images
- monokini, underwater photographs, 23 images
- topless bathing suit with matching large scarf, 32 images

The monokini (also known as a "topless bikini" or "unikini") was designed by Rudi Gernreich in 1964, consisting of only a brief, close-fitting bottom and two thin straps; it was the first women's topless swimsuit. His revolutionary and controversial design included a bottom that "extended from the midriff to the upper thigh" and was "held up by shoestring laces that make a halter around the neck." Some credit Gernreich's design with initiating, or describe it as a symbol of, the sexual revolution.

Gernreich designed the monokini as a protest against a repressive society. He did not initially intend to produce the monokini commercially, but was persuaded by Susanne Kirtland of Look to make it available to the public. When the first photograph of a frontal view of Peggy Moffitt wearing the design was published in Women's Wear Daily on June 3, 1964, it generated a great deal of controversy in the United States and other countries. Gernreich sold about 3,000 suits, but only two were worn in public. The first was worn publicly on June 19, 1964, by Carol Doda in San Francisco at the Condor Nightclub, ushering in the era of topless nightclubs in the United States, and the second at North Avenue beach in Chicago in July 1964 by artist's model Toni Lee Shelley, who was arrested.

== Etymology ==
Gernreich coined the word "monokini" by humorously reinterpreting "bikini" as bi- + kini and replacing bi- ("two") with mono- ("one"), as if kini meant "-piece swimsuit." In reality, "bikini" is unrelated to the Latin prefix bi- and was named by its designer, Louis Réard, after the Bikini Atoll in the Pacific. The first peacetime nuclear weapons test had recently taken place there, and Réard hoped his design would have a similarly explosive effect.

== Background ==
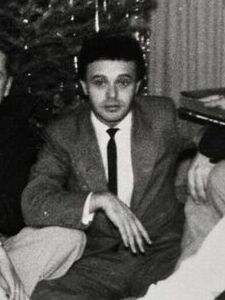
Monokini designer Rudi Gernreich in 1951. Gernreich had predicted in a September 1962 issue of Women's Wear Daily that "Bosoms will be uncovered within five years."

Austrian-American fashion designer, co-founder of the Mattachine Society, and nudist Rudi Gernreich had strong feelings about society's sexualization of the human body and disagreed with religious and social beliefs that the body was essentially shameful. Gernreich developed a reputation as an avant-garde designer who broke many of the rules, and his swimsuit designs were unconventional. In its December 1962 issue, Sports Illustrated remarked, "He has turned the dancer's leotard into a swimsuit that frees the body. In the process, he has ripped out the boning and wiring that made American swimsuits seagoing corsets." That month he first envisioned creating a topless swimsuit which he called a monokini.

== Origins ==
At the end of 1963, editor Susanne Kirtland of Look called Gernreich and asked him to submit a design for the suit to accompany a trend story along futuristic lines. He resisted the idea at first, but said, "It was my prediction. For the sake of history, I didn't want Pucci to do it first." Gernreich found the design more difficult than he expected. His initial designs looked like trunks or boxer shorts. He felt the swimsuit ought to just be bikini bottoms, but realized that this wouldn't constitute a unique design. He initially designed a Balinese sarong that began just under the breasts, but Kirtland didn't feel the design was bold enough and needed to make more of a statement. Gernreich finally chose a design that ended around mid-torso and then added two straps that rose between the breasts and were tied around the neck. The first two initial attempts to cut the design failed. When a photo shoot was arranged on Montego Bay in the Bahamas, all five models hired for the session refused to wear the design. The photographer finally persuaded an adventurous local to model it.

To avoid letting others sensationalize the swimsuit and to retain some control of the design, Gernreich asked William Claxton, the husband of Gernreich's usually sole model Peggy Moffitt, to take pictures of his wife in the yellow wool swimsuit. Claxton, Moffitt, and Gernreich wanted to publish their own pictures for the fashion press and news media, and Gernreich gave pictures of Moffit modeling the monokini to a carefully selected handful of news organizations.

Moffitt was initially resistant to the idea of posing topless. She said, "I didn't want to do it when he asked me. I am a puritanical descendent of the Mayflower. I carried that goddamned Plymouth Rock on my back. When I did give in, I did so with a lot of rules. I would not show myself on the runway that way. I'd do it only with Bill. Since Rudi would never ever have enough money to do this, I did it for free. But I had final say on everywhere it went photographically." Look published a rear view, of an adventurous local from Montego Bay, modeling the swimsuit on June 2, 1964. Claxton took his pictures of Moffit to Life but they said they could only print pictures of naked breasts "if the woman is an aborigine." Claxton took additional pictures of Moffit especially for Life with her arms covering her breasts. The picture was one of several images of Moffit in a story about the historical evolution of the breast in fashion history from 1954 to 1964. Moffit said, "The photograph of me in that issue—hiding my breasts with my arms—is dirty. If you are wearing a fashion that does not have a top as part of its design and hold your arms over your bosom, you're going along with the whole prudish, teasey thing like a Playboy bunny."

The following day columnist Carol Bjorkman of Women's Wear Daily published Claxton's frontal view of Moffitt wearing the suit. It became a celebrated image of the extremism of 1960s designs. Moffit later said, "It was a political statement. It wasn't meant to be worn in public." On June 12, 1964 the San Francisco Chronicle featured a photo of a woman in a monokini with her exposed breasts clearly visible on its front page. Claxton's frontal image of Moffit modeling the swimsuit was subsequently published by Life and numerous other publications. Life writer Shana Alexander noted, "One funny thing about toplessness is that it really doesn't have much to do with breasts. Breasts of course are not absurd; topless swimsuits are. Lately people keep getting the two things mixed up." She mocked the swimsuit design as a "joke". The photo catapulted Moffitt into instant celebrity, reportedly resulting in her receiving everything from marriage proposals to death threats. Moffitt and Claxton later wrote The Rudi Gernreich Book, described as an aesthetic biography of the fashion revolutionary.^{[A]}

Gernreich originally thought that only "six or seven" monokinis would likely be sold, but decided to design it anyway. However, when the design got worldwide notice, orders for the non-existent suit poured in until over 1,000 orders were pending. Despite the reaction of fashion critics and church officials, Harmon Knitwear made over 3,000 monokinis. Gernreich first sold the suit to the Joseph Magnin department store in San Francisco, where it was an instant hit. In New York City, leading stores like B. Altman & Company, Lord & Taylor, Henri Bendel, Splendiferous and Parisette placed orders. On June 16, 1964, Gernreich's topless swimsuit went on sale in New York City. The suit was priced at $24 each.

Moffit said in 1985 that she had been offered $17,000 in 1964 (equivalent to $176,000 in 2025) by Playboy to publish Claxton's photograph of her wearing the suit, but refused. "I turned it down as unthinkable. And I don't want to exploit women any more now than I did in 1964. The statement hasn't changed. The suit still is about freedom and not display."

On August 13, 1985, Los Angeles Fashion Group produced a gala at the Wiltern Theatre to benefit the Rudi Gernreich Design Scholarship Fund. Moffit was a member of the committee. When the group considered showing the Monokini suit during the benefit, Moffitt strongly objected.

The regional director of the Fashion Group, Sarah Worman, believed that the swimsuit was "the single most important idea he ever had—the one that changed the way women dressed all over the Western world." She said Moffitt's refusal to show it on a model did not make sense when the benefit was modeling everything else he ever did on live models.

== Fashion statement ==
Gernreich did not originally intend to produce the swimsuit commercially. It had more meaning to Gernreich as an idea than as a reality. Gernreich had Moffitt model the suit in person for Diana Vreeland of Vogue, who asked him why he conceived of the design. Gernreich told her he felt it was time for "freedom-in fashion as well as every other facet of life," but that the swimsuit was just a statement. He said, "[Women] drop their bikini tops already," he said, "so it seemed like the natural next step." She told him, "If there's a picture of it, it's an actuality. You must make it." Gernreich said in television interview, "It may well be a bit much now. But, just wait. In a couple of years topless bikinis will be a reality and regarded as perfectly natural."

Gernreich purposefully used his designs to advance his socio-political views. He wanted to reduce the stigma of a naked body, to "cure our society of its sex hang up," as he put it. Gernreich stated, "To me, the only respect you can give to a woman is to make her a human being. A totally emancipated woman who is totally free."

Gernreich said, "Baring the breasts seemed logical in a period of freer attitudes, freer minds, the emancipation of women." Gernreich told Time magazine in 1969, the monokini "is a natural development growing out of all the loosening up, the re-evaluation of values that's going on. There is now an honesty hangup, and part of this is not hiding the body—it stands for freedom."

In January 1965, he told Gloria Steinem in an interview that despite the criticism he'd do it again.

Moffitt said the design was a logical evolution of Gernreich's avant-garde ideas in swimwear design as much as a scandalous symbol of the permissive society. She said, "He was trying to take away the prurience, the whole perverse side of sex." She said his design was "prophetic." "It had to do with more than what to wear to the beach. It was about a changing culture throughout all society, about freedom and emancipation. It was also a reaction against something particularly American: the little boy snickering that women had breasts."

Los Angeles Times staff writer Bettijane Levine wrote, "His topless was an artistic statement against women as sex objects, much as Pablo Picasso painted Guernica as a statement against war." Over the next few weeks, his design was covered in more than 20,000 press articles.

== History ==
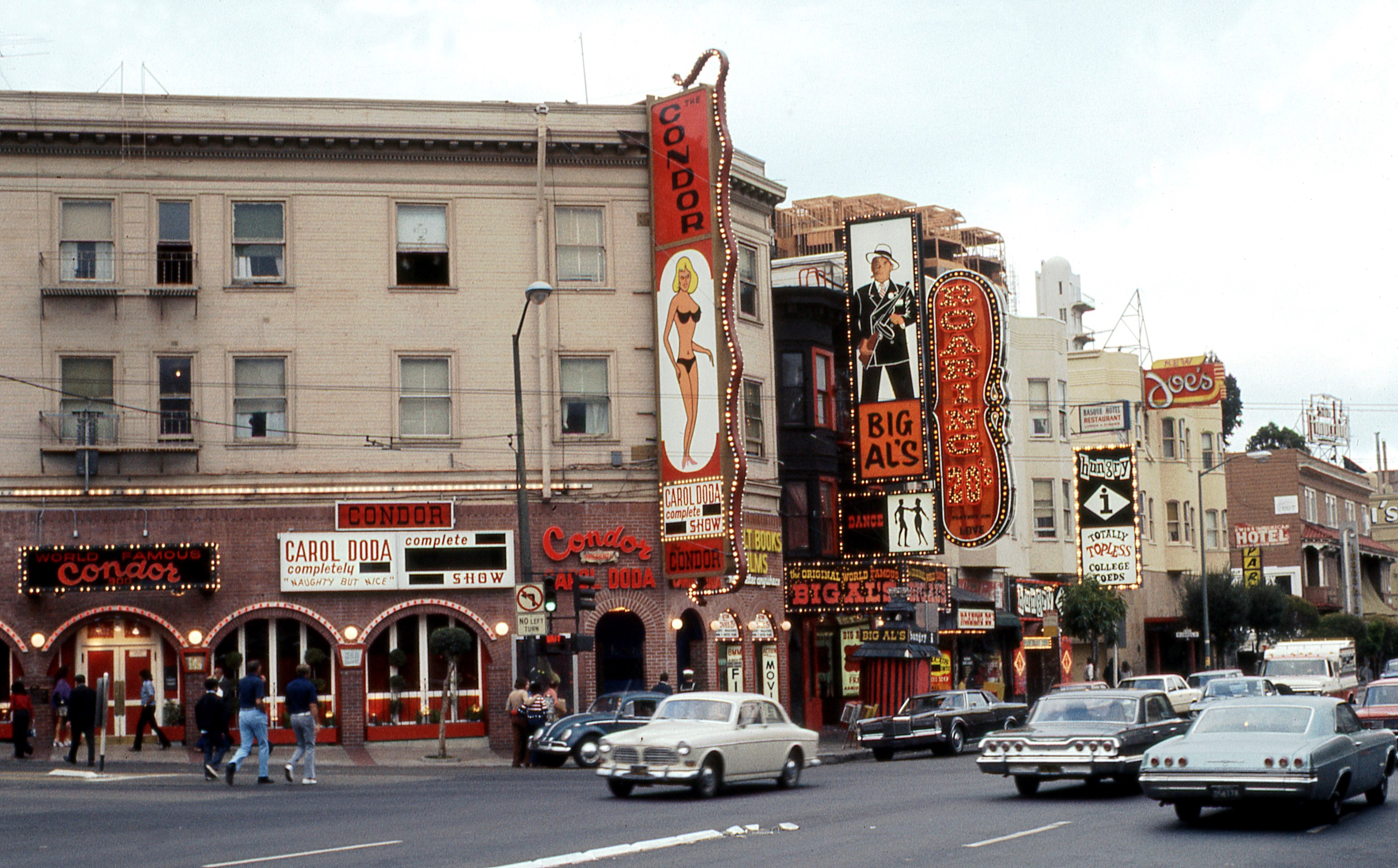
Carol Doda wore Gernreich's monokini for her act at the Condor Club, starting the trend of topless bars

There was a strong public reaction to the original swimsuit design. The Soviet Union denounced the suit, saying it was "barbarism" and indicated "capitalistic decay". The Vatican denounced the swimsuit, and the L'Osservatore Romano said the "industrial-erotic adventure" of the topless bathing suit "negates moral sense." Many of Rudi's contemporaries in the fashion industry reacted negatively. In the US, some Republicans tried to blame the suit on the Democrats' stance on moral issues. Gernreich introduced the monokini at a time when U.S. nudists were trying to establish a public persona. The United States Postmaster General had banned nudist publications from the mail until 1958, when the Supreme Court of the United States declared that the naked body in and of itself could not be deemed obscene. Use of the word monokini was first recorded in English that year.

In the 1960s, the monokini influenced the sexual revolution by emphasizing a woman's personal freedom of dress, even when her attire was provocative and exposed more skin than had been the norm during the more conservative 1950s. Quickly renamed a "topless swimsuit", the design was never successful in the United States, although the issue of allowing both genders equal exposure above the waist has been raised as a feminist issue from time to time.

As the suit gained notoriety, the New York City Police Department was strictly instructed by the commissioner of parks to arrest any woman wearing a monokini. In Dallas, Texas, when a local store featured the suit in a window display, members of the Carroll Avenue Baptist Mission picketed until they removed the display. Copious coverage of the event helped to send the image of exposed breasts across the world. Women's clubs and the Catholic church actively condemned the design. In Italy and Spain, the Catholic Church warned against the topless fashion.

=== France ===
In France in 1964, Roger Frey led the prosecution of the use of the monokini, describing it as: "a public offense against the sense of decency, punishable according to article 330 of the penal code. Consequently, the police chiefs must employ the services of the police so that the women who wear this bathing suit in public places are prosecuted." At St. Tropez on the French Riviera, where toplessness later became the norm, the mayor ordered police to ban toplessness and to watch over the beach via helicopter.

Jean-Luc Godard, a founding mover of French New Wave cinema, incorporated monokini footage shot by Jacques Rozier in Riviera into his film A Married Woman, but it was edited out by the censors. A few defended Gernreich's design. Fashion designers Geraldine Stutz, president of Henri Bendel, said, "I only wish I were young enough to be one of the pioneers myself." Carol Bjorkman, a columnist at Women's Wear-Daily's wrote, "What's the matter with the front? After all, it is here to stay, and it is awfully nice being a girl."

=== Chicago ===
When Toni Lee Shelley, a 19-year-old artists model, wore the topless bathing suit to the North Avenue beach in Chicago in 1964, 12 police officers responded, 11 to control and disperse the public and photographers, and one to arrest her. She was charged with disorderly conduct, indecent exposure, and appearing on a public beach without suitable attire. At her arraignment she asked for an all-male jury. She told the press that the swimsuit was "certainly more comfortable." Shelley was fined US$100 for wearing the swimsuit on a public beach.

=== San Francisco ===
On 12 June 1964, the San Francisco Chronicle published on its front page a photo of a woman with clearly visible, exposed breasts wearing a monokini.

On 19 June 1964, Davey Rosenberg saw an Joseph Magnin ad for the Monokini in a newspaper. Davey Rosenberg, the publicist of the Condor Club in San Francisco's North Beach district, bought Gernreich's monokini from Joseph Magnin, and gave it to former prune picker, file clerk, and waitress Carol Doda to wear for her act. That night, June 19, Doda became the first modern topless dancer in the United States, renewing the burlesque era of the early 1900s in the U.S. San Francisco Mayor John Shelley said, "topless is at the bottom of porn." Within a few days, women were baring their breasts in many of the clubs lining San Francisco's Broadway St., ushering in the era of the topless bar. Doda's debut as a topless dancer was featured in Playboy magazine in April 1965.

San Francisco public officials tolerated the topless bars until April 22, 1965, when Doda was arrested along with Pete Mattioli and Gino del Prete, owners of the Condor Club. Hundreds of protesters gathered outside the police department, calling for release of both Doda and free speech activist Mario Savio, held in the same station. Doda, Mattioli and Gino del Prete were cleared when two judges instructed not-guilty verdicts. Judge Friedman's memorandum to opposing attorneys reads, "Whether acts ... are lewd and dissolute depends not on any individual's interpretation or personal opinion, but on the consensus of the entire community...". Doda rapidly became a symbol of sexual freedom, while topless restaurants, along with shoeshine parlors, ice-cream stands and girl bands proliferated in San Francisco and elsewhere. Journalist Earl Wilson wrote in his syndicated column, "Are we ready for girls in topless gowns? Heck, we may not even notice them." English designers created topless evening gowns inspired by the idea. The San Francisco Examiner published a real estate advertisement that promised "bare top swimsuits are possible here".

== Later designs ==
Modern monokinis
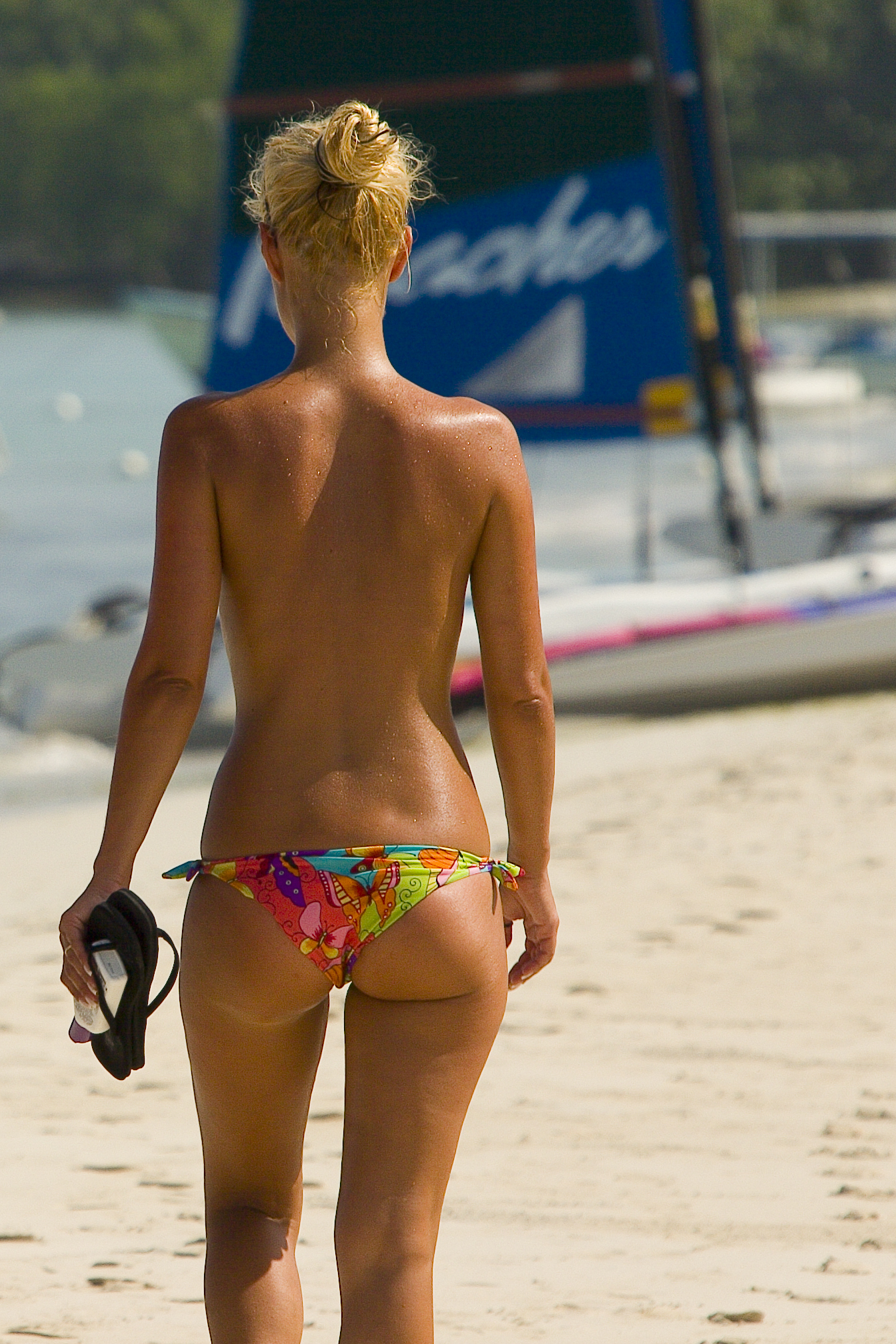
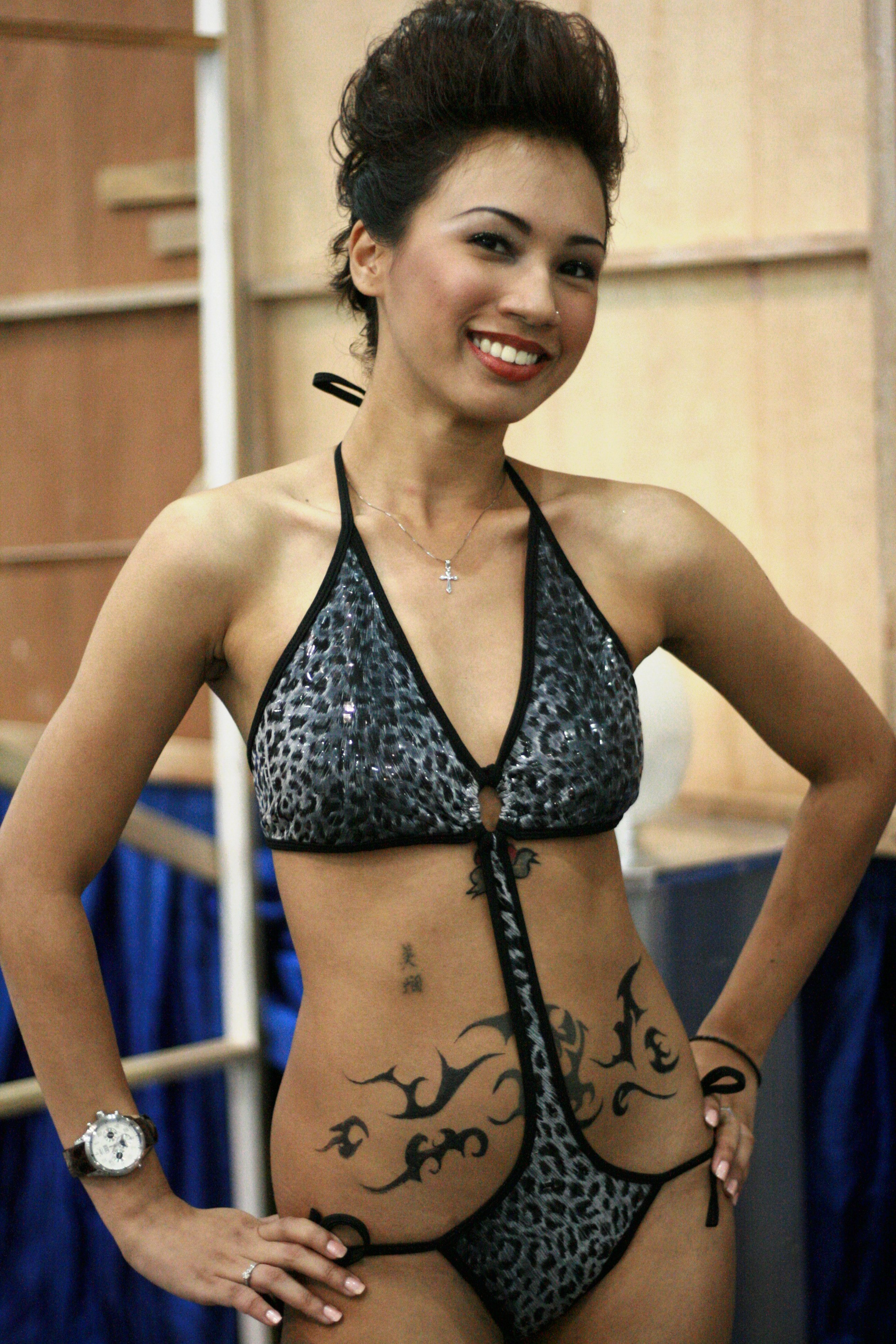
Modern Monokini designs range from bikini bottoms only (left) to single-piece swimwear with cutouts (right)

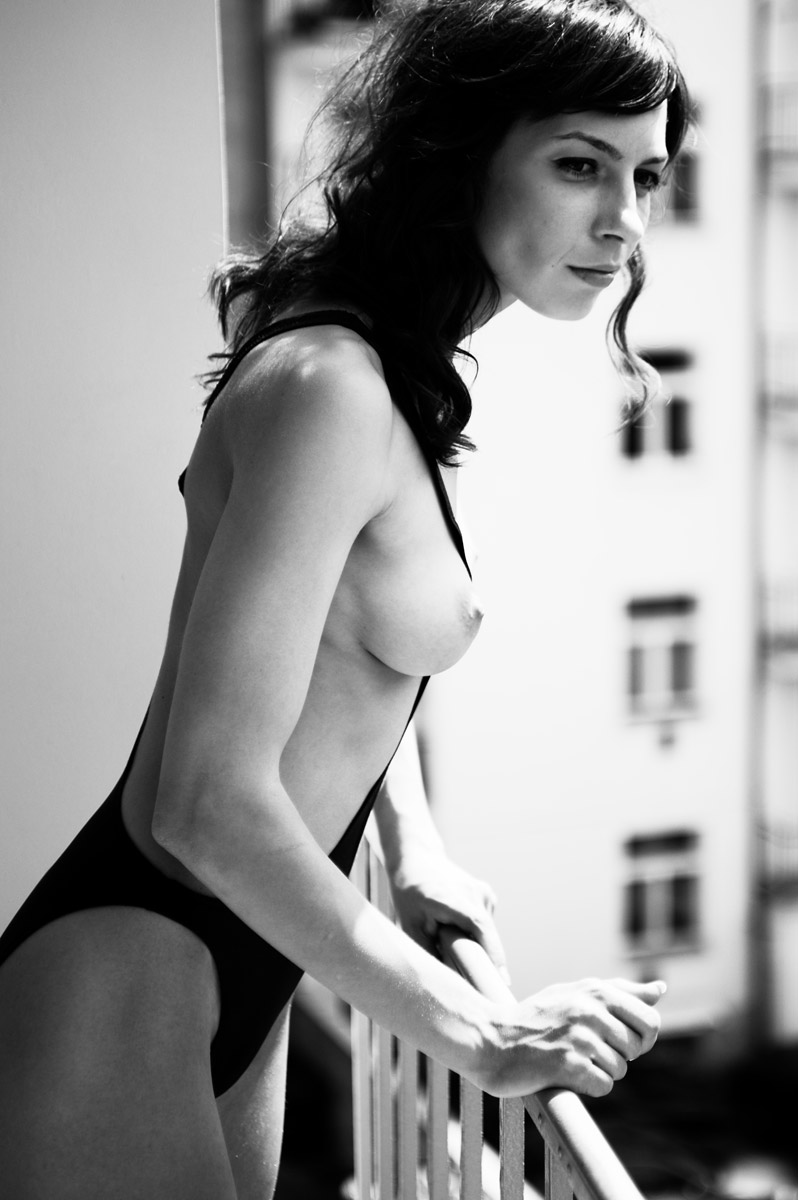
Woman wearing a monokini, 2010

The statement of the monokini made by Minimale Animale on the runways of Mercedes Benz Fashion Week in 2014

Going topless reached its highest popularity during the 1970s. In the early 1980s monokini designs that were simply a bikini-bottom (also known as the unikini) became popular. As of 2015, some swimsuit designers continue to produce a variety of monokini or topless swimsuits that women can wear in private settings or in places where topless swimsuits are allowed.

Unlike Gernreich's original design exposing the women's breasts, more modern designs are one-piece swimsuits that cover the women's breasts but typically include large cut-outs on the sides, back, or front. The cutouts are connected with varying fabrics, including mesh, chain, and other materials to link the top and bottom sections together. From the back the monokini looks like a two-piece swimsuit. The design may not be functional but aesthetic. Some suits are designed with a g-string style back and others offer full coverage.

=== Pubikini ===
In 1985, four weeks before his death, Gernreich unveiled the lesser-known pubikini, a topless bathing suit that exposed the wearer's mons pubis. It was a thin, V-shaped, thong-style bottom that in the front featured a tiny strip of fabric that exposed the wearer's pubic hair. The pubikini was described as a pièce de résistance totally freeing the human body.

== See also ==
- Bikini variants
- Maillot
- Monokini 2.0
- Nude beach
- Nude swimming
- One-piece swimsuit
- Topfreedom
- Toplessness
