= Oreste Pucciani =

American philologist and academic (1916–1999)

Oreste Francesco Pucciani (April 7, 1916 – April 28, 1999) was a pioneer teacher of Jean-Paul Sartre's philosophy at UCLA. He was the last partner of Rudi Gernreich, fashion designer, and at the latter's death, established the ACLU Rudi Gernreich-Oreste Pucciani Endowment Fund to support the fight for LGBT rights.

== Early life ==
Oreste Francesco Pucciani was born in Cleveland, Ohio, on April 7, 1916.

He attended public schools in Cleveland and graduated from Adelbert College, Western Reserve University (later Case Western Reserve University) in 1939. He was part of the Phi Beta Kappa. He then completed his education with a doctorate in Romance languages from Harvard University in 1943. His doctoral dissertation analyzed Walt Whitman's reception in France.

From 1946 to 1947, Pucciani obtained a Sheldon Traveling Fellowship and studied in France and Italy. He met Jean-Paul Sartre and Simone de Beauvoir.

== Career ==
In 1947 Oreste Pucciani returned to the United States and at first lectured at Harvard, and in 1948 he joined University of California, Los Angeles, at first as Assistant Professor of French. In 1954 he became Associate Professor and in 1960 he was named full Professor. From 1961 to 1966 he was chairman of the French department, and became professor emeritus in 1979.

In 1954 he published The French Theater since 1930, a still used anthology of French theater between World War I and World War II. In 1961 he published a translation of Jean Racine's Phèdre: Pucciani was a pioneer teacher on Jean-Paul Sartre's philosophy at UCLA even before Sartre was translated into English.

Pucciani studied with Emile B. De Sauzé at Adelbert College, and was a supporter of Sauzé's "direct method" of language teaching, which he introduced in the late 1950s to the UCLA French Department's language program: he banned the use of English from his classrooms; although today this is common practice, at the time was a revolutionary method in the United States, where foreign languages were taught using English translations and learning by memory already built sentences. In 1967 Pucciani together with Jacqueline Hamel published Langue et Langage, a textbook describing the experience of the UCLA French Department with the direct method.

In 1965 Pucciani was awarded the Knight's Cross of the Legion of Honour by the French government for his services to French language and culture.

== Personal life ==
Pucciani was the last partner of Rudi Gernreich, fashion designer, and at the latter's death, established the ACLU Rudi Gernreich-Oreste Pucciani Endowment Fund to support the fight for LGBT rights.

He died in Los Angeles on April 28, 1999.
