= Go-go dancing =

Form of nightclub entertainment

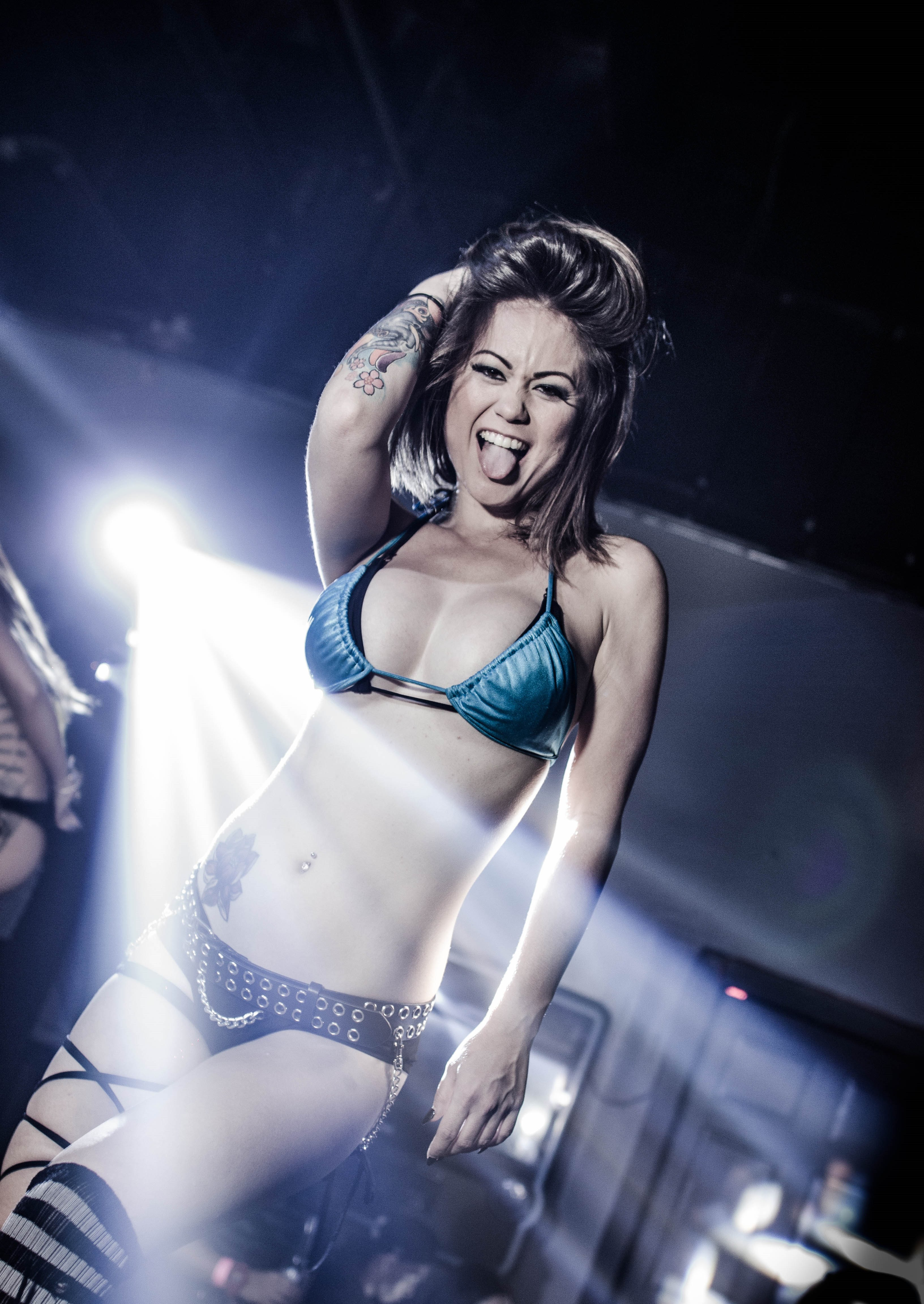
Modern go-go dancer Cherry Lei at The Fix, in Honolulu, Hawaii, in 2014

Go-go dancers are dancers who are employed to entertain crowds at nightclubs or other venues where music is played. Go-go dancing originated in the early 1960s at the French bar Whisky a Gogo, located in the town of Juan-les-Pins. The French bar then licensed its name to the West Hollywood rock club Whisky a Go Go, which opened in January 1964 and chose the name to reflect the already popular craze of go-go dancing. Many 1960s-era nightclub dancers wore short, fringed skirts and high boots which eventually came to be called go-go boots. Nightclub promoters in the mid‑1960s then conceived the idea of hiring women dressed in these outfits to entertain patrons.

== Etymology ==
The term go-go derives from the phrase "go-go-go" for a high-energy person, and was influenced by the French expression à gogo, meaning "in abundance, galore", which is in turn derived from the Old French word la gogue for "joy, happiness". The term go-go dancer originated from the French bar Whisky à Gogo located in Juan-les-Pins, a seaside town near Cannes, which was among the first places in the world to replace live music with records selected by a disc jockey and to provide the spectacle of paid dancers known as go-go girls. The bar's name was taken from the French title of the Scottish comedy film Whisky Galore!

== In the 1960s ==
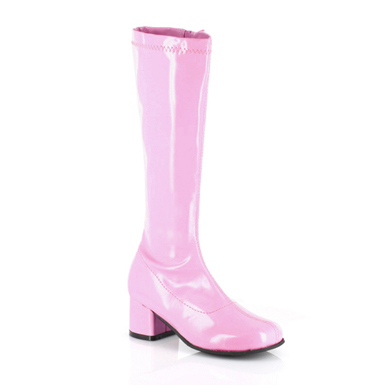
Go-go boot

On 19 June 1964, Carol Doda began go-go dancing topless at the Condor Club on Broadway and Columbus in the North Beach neighborhood of San Francisco. She became the world's most famous topless and bottomless go-go dancer, dancing at the Condor for 22 years. In Canada, in 1966, Bonny Rush was mentioned as the country's first topless go-go dancer in the news media. In general, however, go-go dancers in the 1960s did not work topless.

In 1964, the Los Angeles–based club Whisky a Go Go began suspending go-go dancers above the audience in glass cages. Located on the Sunset Strip in West Hollywood, the club hired scantily clad dancers wearing knee-high vinyl go-go boots (or occasionally the Courrèges boots which inspired them) and mini skirts or mini flapper dresses. The club began to hire go-go dancers regularly in July 1965.

Go-go discotheques began to open across the United States. In 1967, an article in Newsweek estimated that there were 8000 go-go dancers working in the US, aged mostly between 18 and 21. The majority of go-go dancers in the New York metropolitan area were migrants from Brazil. Go-go dancing was generally performed to recorded music rather than a live band. The go-go dancers danced on tables, in cages, on dance floors or on small go-go stages. Their role was to entertain the audience and demonstrate dance moves. Many dancers hoped that go-go dancing would provide them a way into show business. Others simply earned money while travelling around the US as part of the counterculture of the 1960s. Earnings from go-go dancing in the mid-1960s were around $125–$200 per week.

In Germany, Der Spiegel, in an article on discotheque trends in April 1965, described the Scotch Kneipe and the Pussycat in Munich as the first discotheques in the country to feature go-go dancers performing in cages above the audience. In Canada in 1967, a club in Montreal's York Hotel began to employ the city's first go-go dancers. Other Montreal venues followed, including bars, hotels, taverns and strip clubs. The dancers initially wore pasties but over the years the amount of nudity shown increased.

=== Television and media ===
Go-go dancers were employed as background dancers accompanying performances (real or lip-synced) by rock and roll bands on teen music programs in the mid-1960s. Hullabaloo was a musical variety series that ran on NBC from 12 January 1965 to 29 August 1966. The Hullabaloo Dancers—a team of four men and six women—appeared on a regular basis. Another female dancer, model/actress Lada Edmund, Jr., was best known as the caged "go-go girl" dancer in the Hullabaloo A-Go-Go segment near the closing sequence of the show. Other dance TV shows during this period such as ABC's Shindig! (16 September 1964 – 8 January 1966) also featured go-go dancers in cages. Sometimes these cages were made of clear plastic with lights strung inside of them; sometimes the lights were synchronized to go on and off with the music. Shivaree (syndicated, 1965–1966), another music show, usually put go-go dancers on scaffolding and on a platform behind the band which was performing. Beat-Club, a German show in the period, also used go-go dancers.

Go-go dancing became the subject of 1960s pop songs such as "Little Miss Go-Go" (1965) by Gary Lewis & the Playboys and "Going to a Go-Go" (1965) by the Miracles.

== In the 1970s and after ==
During the 1970s, discotheques became less popular and few nightclubs employed go-go dancers. Opportunities for go-go dancing work mainly continued at strip clubs where the audience was all male. Most of the strip clubs in the 1970s abandoned traditional burlesque striptease in favour of live sex shows and go-go dancing which was performed topless or nude.

However, in the late 1970s, there was a nightclub at 128 West 45th Street (the same location where the Peppermint Lounge had been) in Manhattan, New York City, called G.G. Barnum's Room, patronized largely by transgender women, that had male go-go dancers who danced on trapezes above a net over the dance floor. In 1978, the Xenon night club in Manhattan became the first night club to provide go-go boxes for amateur go-go dancers to dance on.

During the 1980s, go-go dancing continued in strip clubs and peep shows. Lawmakers in some jurisdictions passed regulations prohibiting nude dancing, requiring go-go dancers to wear pasties and a G-string. These laws were challenged under the First Amendment to the United States Constitution using the argument that naked go-go dancing qualifies as free speech.

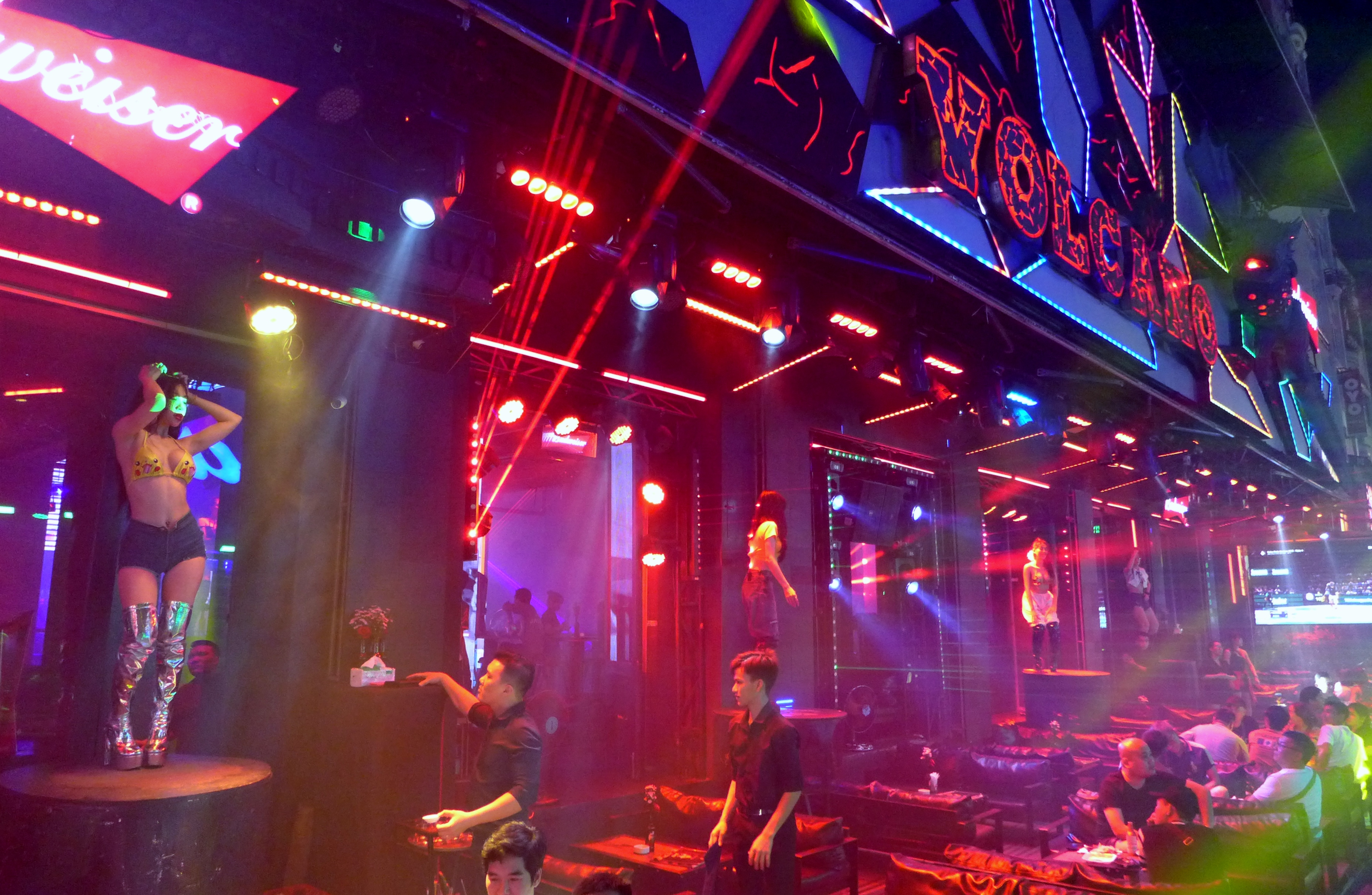
Go-go dancers outside a nightclub in Ho Chi Minh City, Vietnam, in 2023

Musical styles such as techno, house music and trance music appeared during the 1990s as part of underground rave culture. As these styles became mainstream, an increase in the use of go-go dancing accompanied their rise in popularity. Dancers performing to these musical styles began to appear at music festivals and nightclubs to encourage the crowd to dance. In the 21st century, professional go-go dancers, mostly female, are paid to dance at these events in elaborate, brightly coloured costumes. They are sometimes called performance art dancers.

HorrorPops, a Danish punk band, often accompany their performances with go-go dancers, having recruited two go-go dancers in 2000 for the band's live shows.

In Russia, in the 2013 elections the Civilian Power party put forward four female go-go dancers as candidates for deputies.

== LGBTQ ==
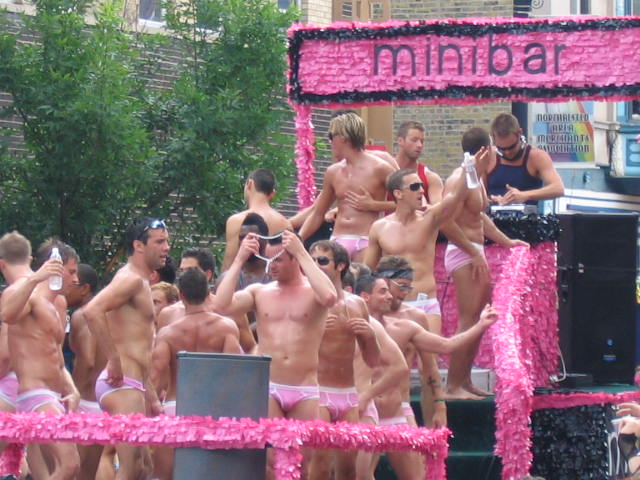
Go-go boys at the June 2008 Chicago Pride Parade

Many gay clubs had male go-go dancers, often called go-go boys, from 1965 to 1968, after which few gay clubs had go-go dancers. In the early 1980s, New York's gay Anvil club featured go-go dancers and drag shows. By the 1990s, go-go dancing was taking place in the city's lesbian bars and clubs and male go-go dancers had become fashionable again at gay clubs in big US cities.

During the early 2010s, the City of West Hollywood celebrated the history and culture of go-go dancing by hosting an annual "Go-Go Boy Appreciation Day" that included a street festival and competition. The event also served to promote West Hollywood as a gay destination.

== See also ==
- Erotic dance
- Go-go bar
- Pole dance
- Stripper

=== Film depictions ===
- Faster, Pussycat! Kill! Kill! (1965)
- Monster a Go-Go! (1965)
- Girl in Gold Boots (1968)
- Go Go Tales (2007)
