= Honky Tonk Nights =

- Directed by: Charles Webb
- Written by: Arthur Chance; Charles Webb
- Produced by: Arthur Chance; Charles Webb
- Starring: Carol Doda; Jack Elliott; Georgina Spelvin; The Hotlicks; Dan Carter; Jim Haynie; Bermuda Schwartz; Chris Cassidy; Mike Smith; Amanda Blake; Charles Webb
- Edited by: Ingemar Ejve
- Music by: Marion Cronin; Charles Webb
- Release date: 1978
- Running time: 71 min.
- Country: United States
- Language: English

Honky Tonk Nights is a 1978 American comedy and drama film directed by Charles Webb. The film stars Carol Doda, Jack Elliott, Georgina Spelvin, The Hotlicks and Dan Carter in the lead roles.

== Cast ==
- Carol Doda
- Jack Elliott
- Georgina Spelvin
- Serena
- The Hotlicks
- Dan Carter
- Jim Haynie
- Bermuda Schwartz
- Chris Cassidy
- Mike Smith
- Amanda Blake

== Reception ==
"An odd assortment of people become involved in a small town Mayor's scheme to turn a dying hamlet into a tourist wonderland . You can find better things to do with your evening than watch this accident...", wrote a short review. The film was noted for the presence of various "aging starlets" of the pornographic industry. It's also described in a review in Psychotronic Video Guide as "70s nonsense" and "a dull film", but with a special mention for the presence of the band the Hot Licks (Dan Hicks's band, but without him for the occasion).
