= Condor Club =

Strip club in San Francisco, California

Coordinates: 37°47′53″N 122°24′24″W

The Condor Club nightclub is a striptease bar or topless bar in the North Beach section of San Francisco, California The club became famous in 1964 as the first fully topless nightclub in the United States, featuring the dancer Carol Doda wearing a monokini.

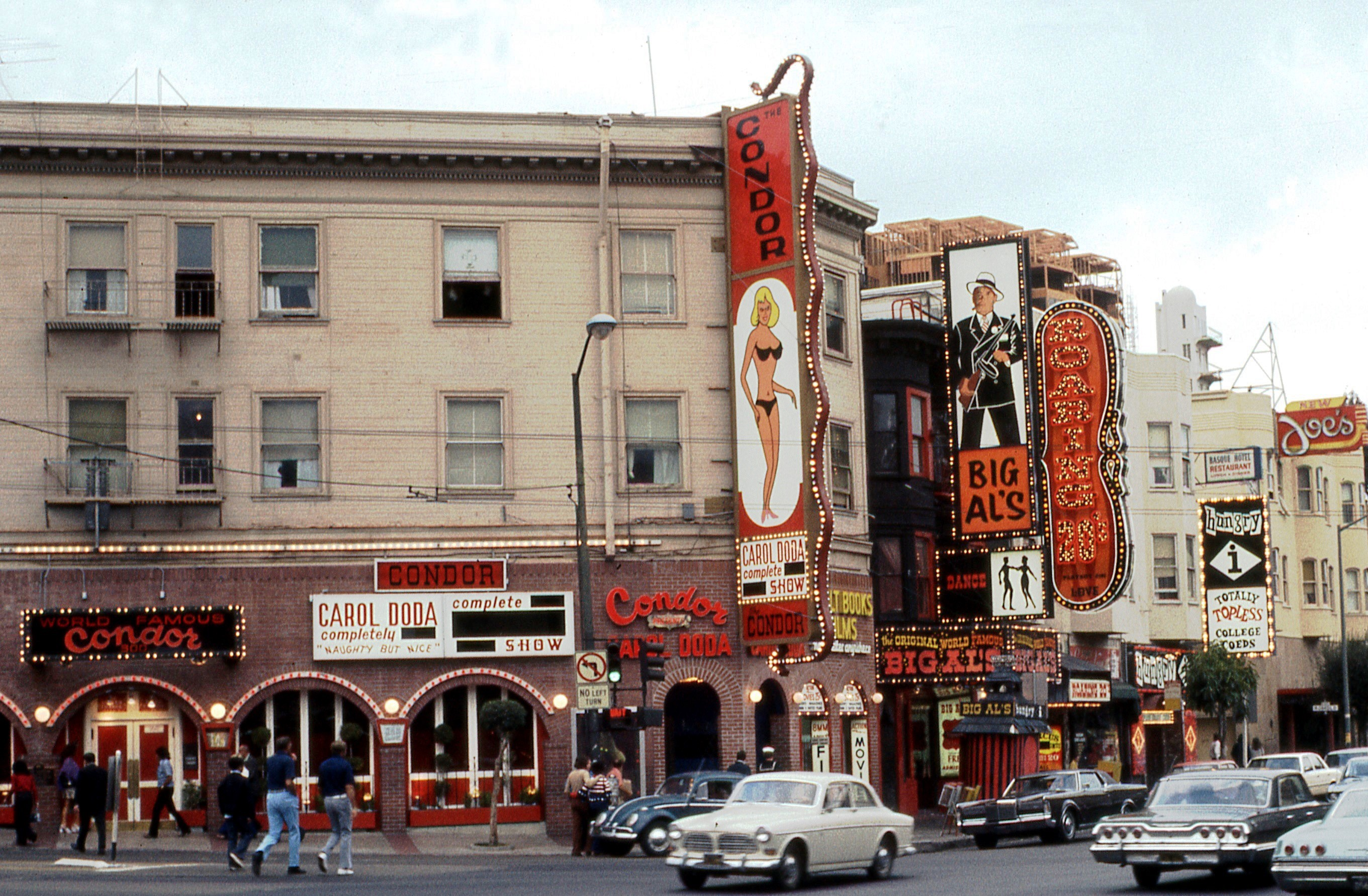
The club in 1973

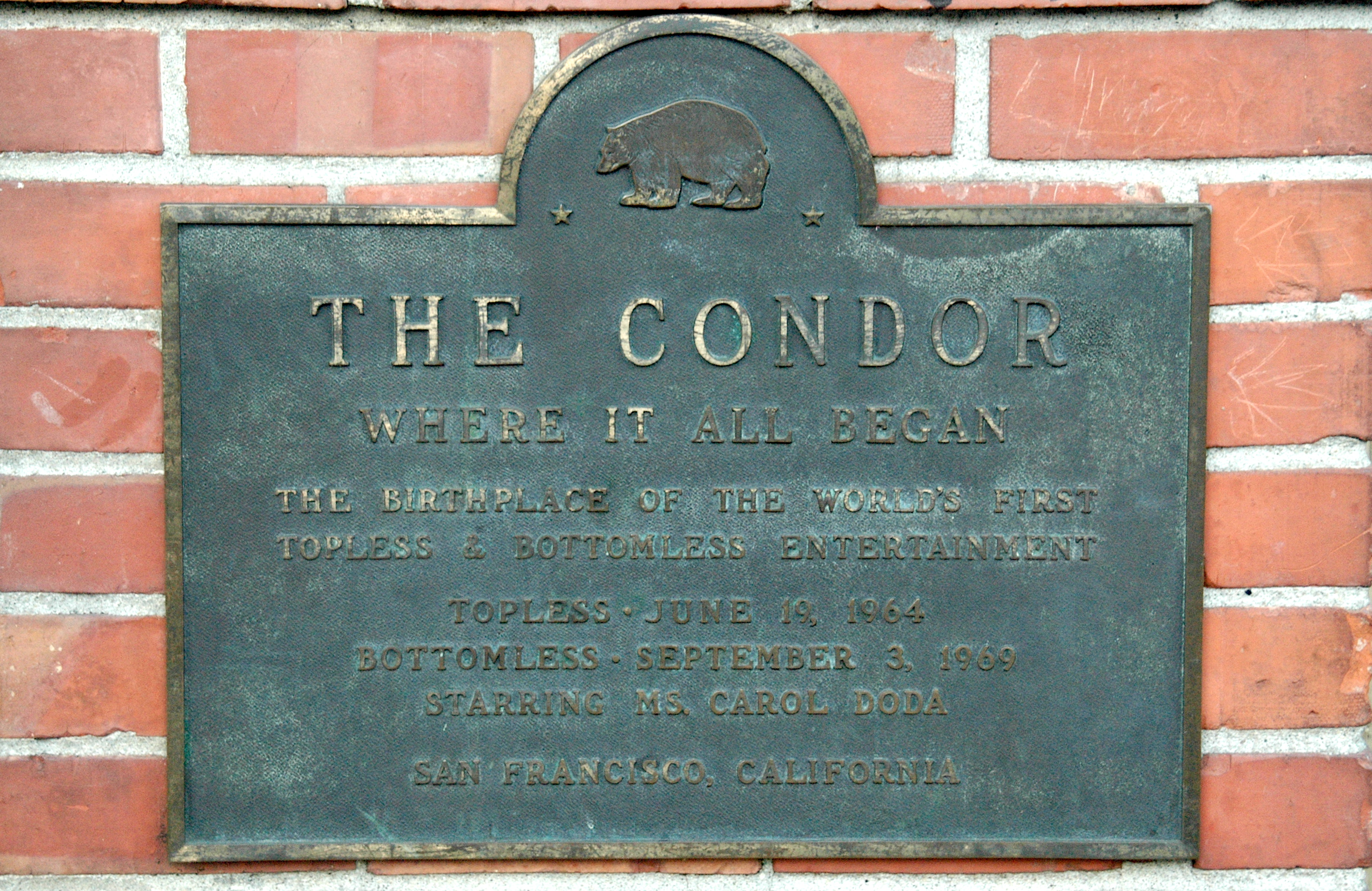
Historical marker commemorating the Condor Club as the world's first topless and bottomless entertainment venue

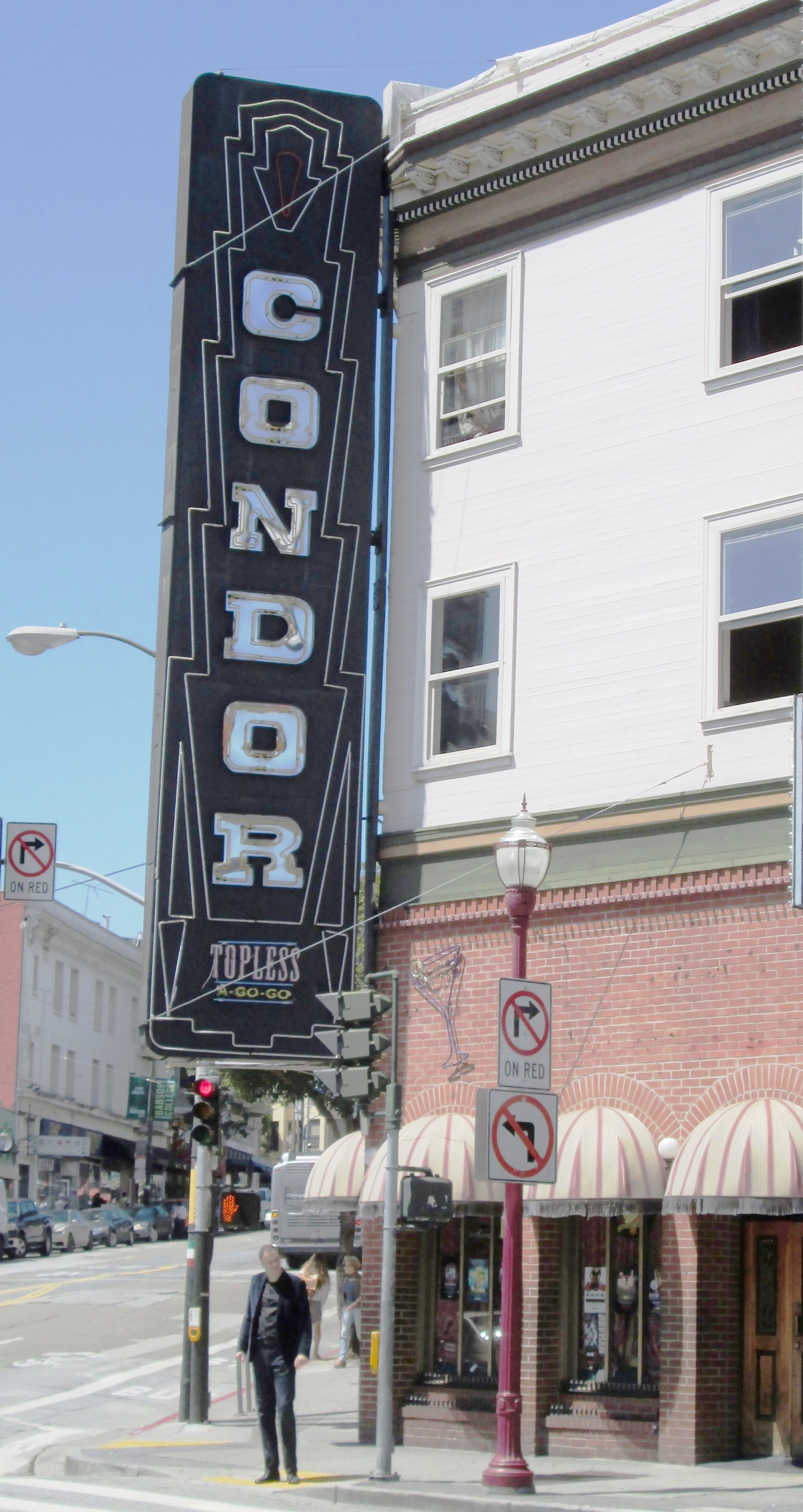
The club in 2017

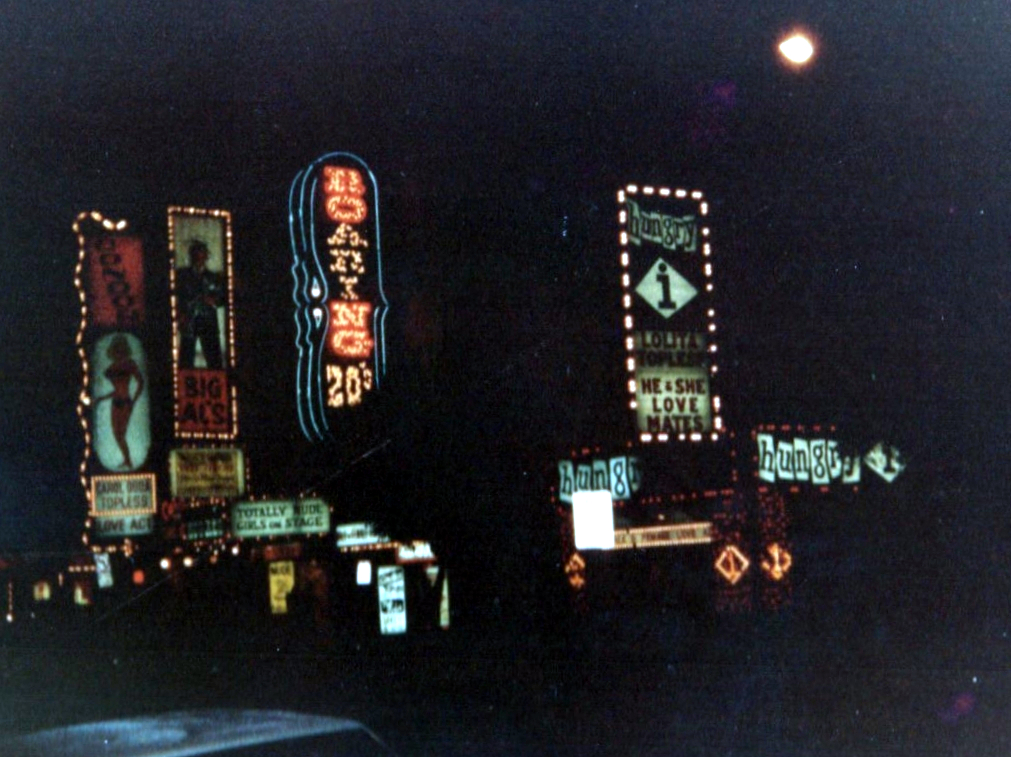
The Condor Club, Big Al's, Roaring 20's and the Hungry Club lit up at night, September 1983

== History ==
The club opened in 1958 and primarily operated as a music venue, putting on acts including Bobby Freeman, The Righteous Brothers and Sly Stone. Located at the corner of Broadway and Columbus Avenue, the venue had been a small bar for most of the 1900s. Known as the Pisco Bar, it was purchased by Mario Puccinili who called it Pucci's House of Pisco. It was sold a couple of times and by 1958 it was owned by Gino Del Prete. Pete Mattioli became Gino's partner in 1958 and promoted the club, which became a jumpin’ jivin’ entertainment center of North Beach, featuring George and Teddy and the Condors. In 1963, they hired a cocktail waitress named Carol Doda. She began topless dancing at the club on the evening of 19 June 1964, wearing the new monokini topless swimsuit. She was the first topless entertainer there and the most famous.

In 1969 Doda began dancing fully nude, or "bottomless", at the club. This led to the popularization of nude dancing acts for nightclub performers until 1972, when it was made illegal in Californian establishments that served alcohol. Doda continued dancing topless at the club until 1985, and a large neon-lit billboard sign was erected in front of the club featuring a picture of her with red flashing lights on the image of her breasts to represent her nipples.

A bizarre death occurred at the Condor Club in November 1983. Bouncer Jimmy Ferrozzo and his girlfriend, exotic dancer Theresa Hill, decided after hours to have sexual intercourse on the famous white piano on which Carol Doda made her entrance, being lowered from the ceiling by cables. They accidentally hit the "on" switch, and the piano rose to the ceiling over the next 90 seconds, trapping the couple. Ferrozzo was asphyxiated, while Hill survived only because she was thinner than her companion.

The club closed in 2000, but soon reopened as a sports bar/bistro. Between 2005 and 2007, it was Andrew Jaeger's House of Seafood & Jazz, a branch of the owner's original restaurant in New Orleans. However, in August 2007, it once again became the Condor Club, once more featuring go-go dancers. The current Condor Club is branded as "San Francisco's Original Gentlemen's Club."

In 2022 the Condor Club was added to the San Francisco Legacy Business registry, a program aimed at supporting historic businesses in the city.

== In the media ==
The book Three Nights at The Condor (2018) by Benita Mattioli, the wife of Pete Mattioli, tells the story of the club and the people involved with it. The documentary Carol Doda Topless at the Condor (2024) narrates the story of the club and the first topless dancer in the United States.

== See also ==
- List of strip clubs
- Lusty Lady – a former chain of peep show establishments with two locations, one in the North Beach district of San Francisco and the other in downtown Seattle
- Mitchell Brothers O'Farrell Theatre – A San Francisco striptease club
- Regal Show World – a defunct adult business in San Francisco
