= Jack Moffitt (screenwriter) =

American screenwriter and film critic (1901–1969)

- Born: John Charles Moffitt; May 8, 1901; Missouri, U.S.
- Died: December 4, 1969
- Occupations: Screenwriter; film critic
- Children: Peggy Moffitt

Jack Moffitt (May 8, 1901 – December 4, 1969), also credited at John C. Moffitt, was an American screenwriter and film critic. Employed by Universal Studios in the 1930s, he wrote screenplays for a number of minor films. Over the years he wrote film reviews for The Kansas City Star, Esquire, and The Hollywood Reporter. He was an ardent anti-Communist, who contributed to the Hollywood blacklist by testifying against others in the film industry for the 1947 House Un-American Activities Committee.

== Early life ==
John Charles Moffitt, later credited as John C. Moffitt and Jack Moffitt, was born on 8 May 1901 in Missouri.

== Career ==
Moffitt worked as a motion picture editor for the Kansas City Star in the 1920s, before moving to Hollywood in 1930 to work at Universal Studios.

=== Play ===
Moffitt first co-wrote the play It Can't Happen Here with Sinclair Lewis, based on the novel of the same name by Lewis. It was "especially adapted for Federal Theatre by the author and J. C. Moffitt", in a production directed by Louis M. Simon produced at the Federal Theatre of New Jersey in Newark, New Jersey, in October 1936, and the play was put on at various other theatres around the country, although the posters do not all credit Moffitt as a co-writer. The play was also produced on Broadway at the Adelphi Theatre from October 26, 1936 to January 1937, staged by Vincent Sherman. He was credited as John C. Moffitt for this production.

=== Films ===
He wrote the screenplay for the 1937 film Mountain Music, for which he was credited as John. C. Moffitt. He wrote the script for Paramount's 1939 melodrama Our Leading Citizen, about industrial action, that was critical of both the "greedy capitalists" and the striking workers.

However he was described as a "journeyman" who never quite rose to the top tier of his profession as a screenwriter.

=== Film reviews ===
In the 1940s he was also a film critic for Esquire magazine. However, two days after testifying for House Un-American Activities Committee (HUAC), he was fired from his post. Apart from a credit on The Story of Will Rogers (1952), he did no more screenwriting, instead working as a freelance writer.

In 1955, he was hired by Billy Wilkerson as a film reviewer for The Hollywood Reporter, where he stayed for eight years. and later also for The Kansas City Star. He is credited as both Jack and John C. Moffitt for the Kansas City Star.

== Other activities ==
In the 1930s he joined Screen Playwrights, Inc. and was embittered by defeat by rival union the Screen Writers Guild (SWG).

He was an ardent anti-Communist. In 1939 he chaired House Un-American Activities Committee (HUAC)'s hearings on the Federal Theater Project. In April 1947 he wrote to Norris Poulson about Twentieth Century Fox "promoting communism within Hollywood", as part of the witchhunts and blacklisting of filmmakers in Hollywood by the Un-American Activities Committee. On May 8, 1947, J. Parnell Thomas chaired a committee which travelled to Hollywood for, according to The Hollywood Reporter a "long threatened probe of Communists in Hollywood," which was held at the Biltmore Hotel. Moffitt appeared as a "friendly" witness, along with MGM producer and story editor James K. McGuinness. He was called back several times and named many people in the screen industry. At first reluctant to do so, he later testified at the October public hearings, blaming filmmakers Frank Tuttle, Herbert Biberman, Donald Ogden Stewart, and John Howard Lawson for "luring him into joining" the Hollywood Anti-Nazi League in 1937. He also said that the SWG was dominated by Communists, and its magazine, The Screen Writer, was "filled with Communist propaganda." He also said that 44 out of the 100 plays selected by New York s "best plays" between 1936 and 1946 were "out and out Communistic", while 233 in that same time frame "favored the party line." Among a host of other attacks on Hollywood filmmakers and films, he criticised the Screen Story Analysis Guild, which, he said, "skewed its reports to support Communist writers", and named specific people involved in this guild. Albert Maltz was escorted out of the show trial when he tried to counter Moffitt's claims. He accused test pilot Slick Goodlin of treason.

== Personal life ==
Moffitt was the father of model and actress Peggy Moffitt. He was described as "corpulent" and "threadbare" when he testified against others in the film industry in 1947,

== Death ==
Moffitt died on 4 December 1969.
