= Peggy Moffitt =

American model and actress (1937–2024)

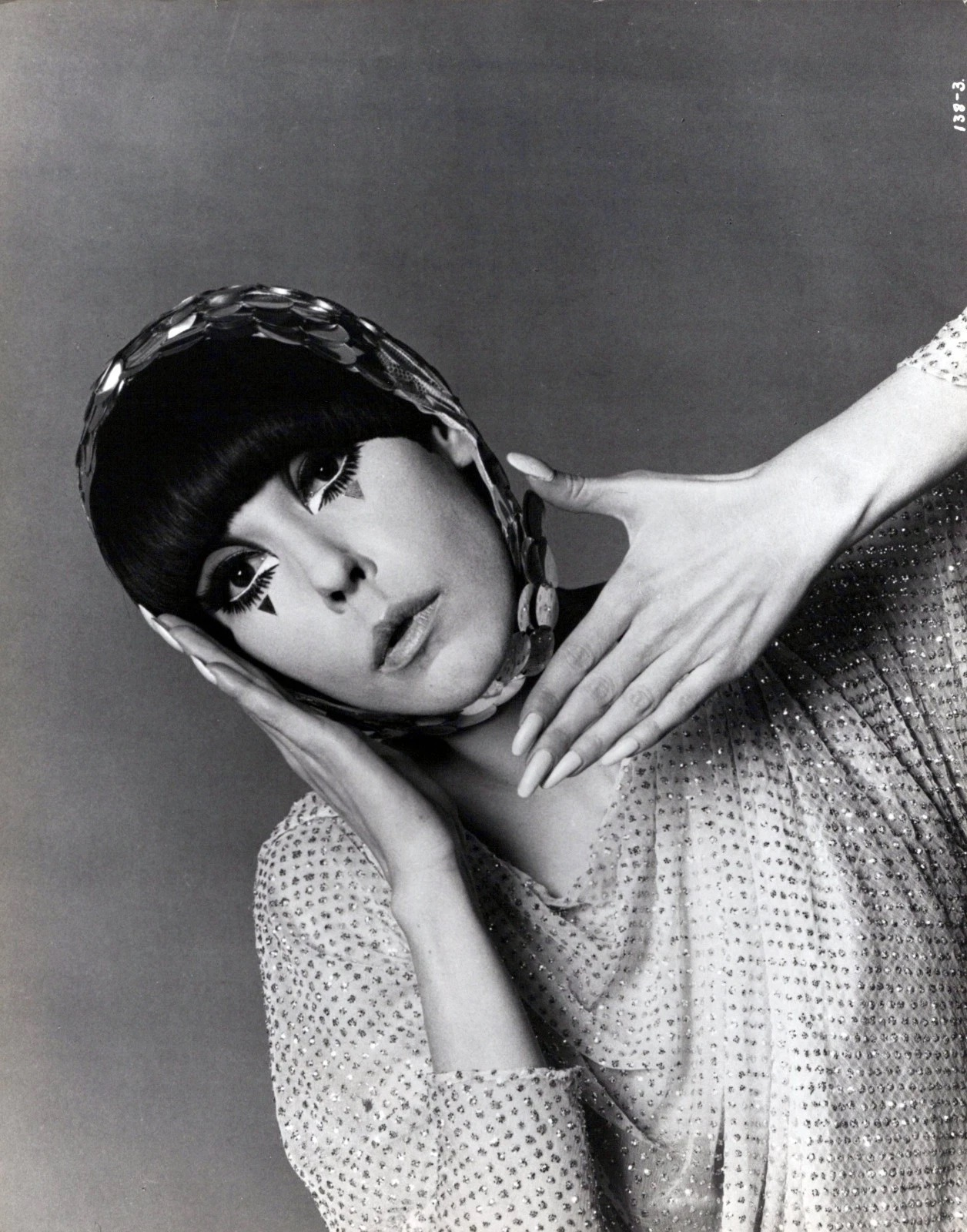
- Moffitt in the 1960s
- Born: Margaret Moffitt; October 2, 1937; Los Angeles, California, U.S.
- Died: August 10, 2024 (aged 86); Beverly Hills, California, U.S.
- Occupations: Model; actress
- Spouse: William Claxton (m. 1959; died 2008)
- Children: 1

Margaret Moffitt (October 2, 1937 – August 10, 2024) was an American model and actress. During the 1960s, she worked very closely with fashion designer Rudi Gernreich, and developed a signature style that featured heavy makeup and an asymmetrical haircut. As an actress, she had a number of bit parts in various films, including as a fashion model in Antonioni's 1966 film Blowup.

== Early life and education ==
Margaret Moffitt was born in Los Angeles on October 2, 1937, the daughter of screenwriter Jack and Mary (née Came) Moffitt.

She grew up in the city's Hancock Park neighborhood and attended the Marlborough School.

She moved to New York City after graduation, where she studied at the Neighborhood Playhouse School of the Theatre in the 1950s. There she was taught by Sydney Pollack and Martha Graham and studied alongside Robert Duvall and Suzanne Pleshette.

== Career ==
=== Acting ===
While still a student in New York in the 1950s, Moffitt had a short-term contract at Paramount Pictures, and appeared in supporting and sometimes uncredited roles in movies with name stars. Her acting career began with an uncredited role in the 1955 film You're Never Too Young, with Jerry Lewis. She returned to Los Angeles to begin her acting career in Hollywood, and had parts in Meet Me in Las Vegas with Cyd Charisse; Up Periscope (1956) with James Garner; and Girls Town (1959); with Mamie Van Doren and Mel Tormé.

In 1966 she appeared in fashion photographer William Klein's 1966 mockumentary, Who Are You, Polly Maggoo?. In the same year, she played a bit part as a fashion model in Michelangelo Antonioni's famous Swinging Sixties film Blowup, filmed in London and starring David Hemmings.

On television, she appeared on The Alfred Hitchcock Hour, Alcoa Theatre, and the 1960s Batman series.

=== Modeling ===
Moffitt first began modeling in Paris in the 1950s.

During the 1960s, she developed a signature style, including false eyelashes and heavy eye makeup. Her hairstyle, an asymmetrical bowl cut, created by Vidal Sassoon, became known as the "five point". Her unique look became an icon of the 1960s fashion scene.

Gernreich collaborated with Moffitt and her husband, photographer William Claxton. The three became "a dynamic and inseparable trio." "Without Rudi I would have been a gifted and innovative model," explained Moffitt in The Rudi Gernreich Book. "Without me he would have been an avant-garde designer of genius. We made each other better. We were each other's catalyst.... It was fun, it was invigorating, it was a true collaboration, and yes, it was love." Moffitt was later described as his muse.

==== Monokini ====
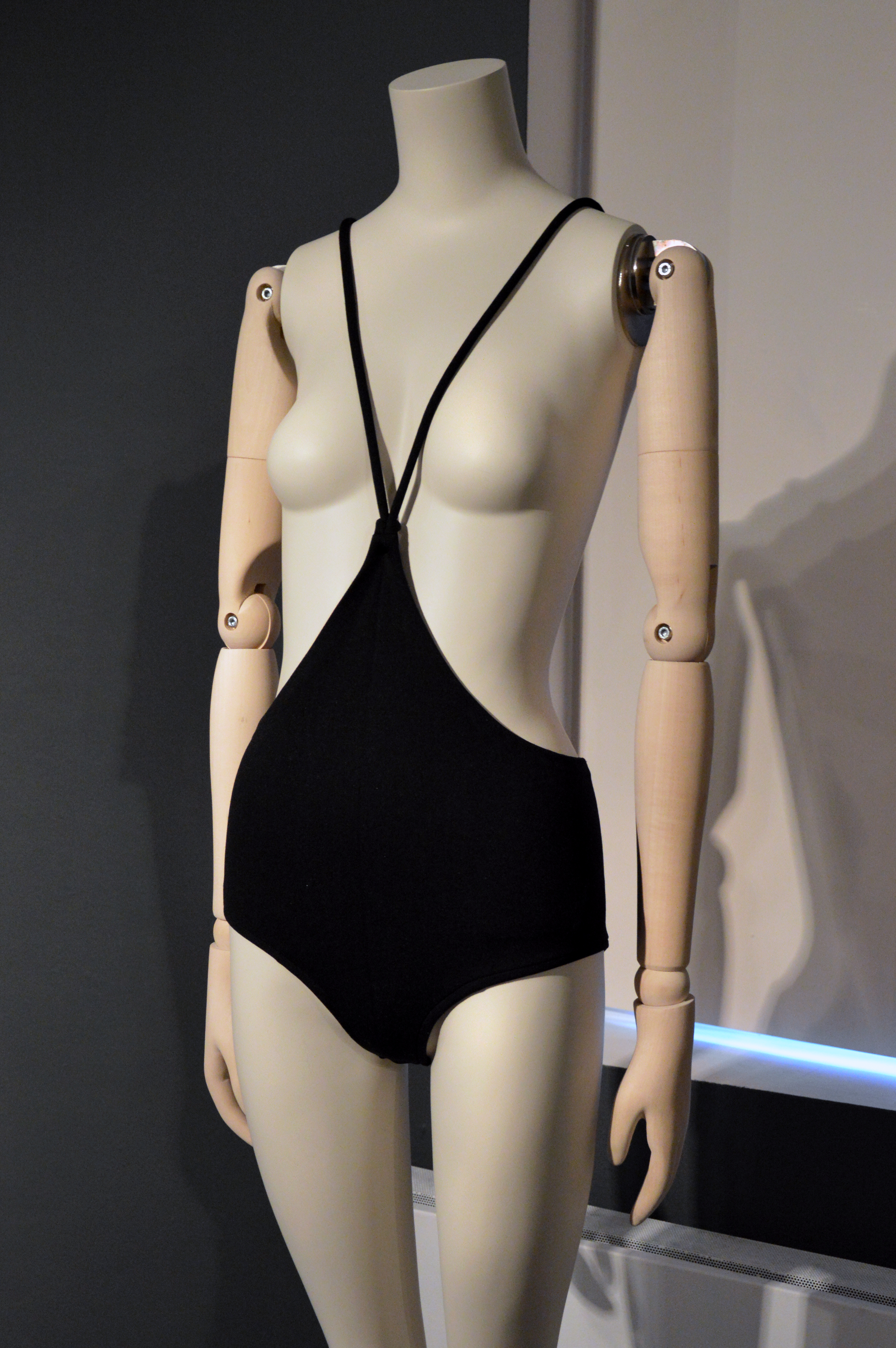
Bathing costume, designed by Rudi Gernreich and modelled by Peggy Moffit

Gernreich first conceived of a topless swimsuit in December 1962, but didn't intend to produce the design commercially. It had more meaning to Gernreich as an idea than as a reality. Gernreich had Moffitt model the suit in person for Diana Vreeland of Vogue, who asked him why he conceived of the design. Gernreich told her he felt it was time for "freedom-in fashion as well as every other facet of life," but that the swimsuit was just a statement. "[Women] drop their bikini tops already," he said, "so it seemed like the natural next step." She told him, "If there's a picture of it, it's an actuality. You must make it." Gernreich decided to call his design a monokini. When a photo shoot was arranged on Montego Bay in Jamaica, all five models hired for the session refused to wear the design. The photographer finally persuaded an adventurous local to model it.

To avoid sensationalizing the design, Moffitt, her husband and photographer, William Claxton, and Gernreich decided to publish their own pictures for the fashion press and news media. Moffitt was initially resistant to the idea of posing topless, and afraid the photograph and ensuing coverage could get out of control. She said,

I am a puritanical descendant of the Mayflower. I carried that goddamned Plymouth Rock on my back. … When I did give in, I did so with a lot of rules. I would not show myself on the runway that way. I'd do it only with Bill. Since Rudi would never ever have enough money to do this, I did it for free. But I had final say on everywhere it went photographically. Not Playboy. Not Esquire. I didn't want to be exploited.

Look was the first to publish, after LIFE refused, a rear view of Moffitt modeling the swimsuit on June 2, 1964, and the following day columnist Carol Bjorkman of Women's Wear Daily published a frontal view picture of Moffitt wearing the suit. The photograph became a world-wide news event. It became a celebrated image of the extremism of 1960s designs. Moffitt later said, "It was a political statement. It wasn't meant to be worn in public."

Moffitt tired of the single-minded attention to the images of her modeling the Monokini. In 2012, she said of the image, "The shot seen around the world. Think of something in your life that took 1/60th of a second to do. Now, imagine having to spend the rest of your life talking about it. I think it's a beautiful photograph, but oh, am I tired of talking about it."

==== Later work ====
In 1985, the Los Angeles Fashion Group staged a Gernreich retrospective, "Looking Back at a Futurist." They wanted a woman to model the monokini, but Moffitt loudly objected because she felt it would exploit Gernreich's intentions. After Gernreich's death, she retained legal rights to his designs and arranged for his designs to be displayed in an exhibition titled The Total Look: The Creative Collaboration Between Rudi Gernreich, Peggy Moffitt, and William Claxton at the Los Angeles Museum of Contemporary Art's Pacific Design Center. She also collaborated with Marylou Luther and her husband to release a comprehensive book chronicling Gernreich's designs.

== Personal life and death ==
Moffitt married photographer William Claxton in 1959. The couple had a son, Christopher, in 1973. They remained married until Claxton's death in October 2008.

Moffitt died from complications of dementia at her home in Beverly Hills, California, on August 10, 2024, at the age of 86. She was interred at Forest Lawn Memorial Park (Hollywood Hills).

== In popular culture ==
Boyd Rice and Giddle Partridge released a limited edition vinyl recording called Going Steady with Peggy Moffitt in 2008.

== Filmography ==
Year	Title	Role	Notes
1955	You're Never Too Young	Agnes	A Martin & Lewis comedy; uncredited
1956	Meet Me in Las Vegas	Showgirl	Uncredited
1956	The Birds and the Bees	Penny	Uncredited
1958	Senior Prom	Girl With Holder	
1959	The Young Captives	Teenager	Uncredited
1959	Up Periscope	Jukebox girl	Uncredited
1959	Battle Flame	Nurse Fisher	
1959	Girls Town	Flo	Alternative title: The Innocent and the Damned
1960	Alcoa Theatre	Dodie Charles	Episode: "Capital Gains"
1960	Goodyear Theatre	Dodie Charles	Episode: "Capital Gains"
1964	The Alfred Hitchcock Hour	Robin Rath	Episode: "Beast in View"
1966	Who Are You, Polly Maggoo?	Mannequin/Model	French title: Qui êtes vous, Polly Maggoo?
1966	Blowup	Model	Uncredited
1967	Basic Black	Model	
