= Jim Haynie =

American actor (1940–2021)

- Born: James Kendal Haynie; February 6, 1940; Falls Church, Virginia
- Died: April 3, 2021 (aged 81); Langley, Washington
- Occupation: Actor
- Spouses: Janice McKelheer; Maggie Causey
- Children: 4

Jim Haynie (February 6, 1940 – April 3, 2021) was an American actor best known for his small roles in television shows and films. Notable among his film credits are performances in Staying Together (1989), The Bridges of Madison County (1995), and The Peacemaker (1997).

== Early life ==
Haynie was born in Falls Church, Virginia, the older of two boys. During his childhood, his family moved around frequently due to his father changing jobs every year or two, residing in various towns in Oklahoma and then Ohio. In his senior year of high school, his family settled in Sunnyvale, California, and after graduating, he headed to UC Davis, where he majored in dramatic art.

== Career ==
Upon moving to San Francisco, Haynie began performing in theatrical presentations at the Magic Theatre, collaborating with Peter Coyote and concert promoter Bill Graham. He entered the film industry in 1978 with a supporting role in Honky Tonk Nights and subsequently appeared in around 100 film and television productions over the following decades. His notable film roles include portraying the school principal in the 1986 teen comedy Pretty in Pink, Jake McDermott in the 1989 tragicomedy Staying Together directed by Lee Grant, Captain Malone in the 1990 action film I Come in Peace, Sheriff Ira Stevens in the 1992 Stephen King adaptation Sleepwalkers, and playing Meryl Streep's character's husband in the 1995 Clint Eastwood romantic drama The Bridges of Madison County.

Haynie portrayed various television roles, including Garrett Gordon in seven episodes of the series Dallas from 1978 to 1979, and also an investigating detective in the 1989 television miniseries I Know My First Name Is Steven, centered around the real case of Steven Stayner.

== Personal life ==
Haynie died of pneumonia on April 3, 2021, at the age of 81. He was married to Maggie Causey. From his previous marriage to Janice McKelheer, he had two children.

== Filmography ==
=== Film ===
Year	Title	Role	Notes
1978	Honky Tonk Nights	Sam Diamond	
1979	Escape from Alcatraz	Guard	
1979	Time After Time	1st Cop	
1980	The Fog	Dockmaster	
1981	Chu Chu and the Philly Flash	Hot Dog Man #1	
1982	48 Hrs.	Old Cop	
1982	Out	Carl / Tommy / Optometrist	
1983	The Right Stuff	Air Force Major	
1984	Country	Arlon Brewer	
1985	Silverado	Bradley	
1986	On the Edge	Owen Riley	
1986	Pretty in Pink	Donnelly	
1986	Hard Traveling	Lieutenant Fisher	
1988	Action Jackson	Morty Morton	
1988	Jack's Back	Sergeant Gabriel	
1988	From Hollywood to Deadwood	Jack Haines	
1989	Private Debts	Narrator (voice)	Short film
1989	Coyote Mountain	Sheriff	Short film
1989	Staying Together	Jake McDermott	
1990	I Come in Peace	Captain Malone	
1990	Men Don't Leave	Mr. Buckley	
1990	Too Much Sun	Father Kelly	
1992	Big Girls Don't Cry... They Get Even	Sheriff	
1992	Timescape	Oscar	
1992	Sleepwalkers	Sheriff Ira Stevens	
1994	On Hope	Preacher	Short film
1995	The Bridges of Madison County	Richard Johnson	
1997	The Last Time I Committed Suicide	Jerry	
1997	The Peacemaker	General Garnett	
1998	Bulworth	Bill Stone	
2000	The Gold Cup	Jack	
2002	Andy Across the Water	Andy	Short film
2003	The United States of Leland	Ben	
2003	Bringing Down the House	Ed Tobias	
2003	Hide	Meyer	Short film
2009	Vocabular Delectations	Athanasius	Short film

=== Television ===
Year	Title	Role	Notes
1979	Undercover with the KKK	First Officer	TV movie
1980	Power	Unknown	TV movie
1980	Alcatraz: The Whole Shocking Story	Salkin	Miniseries
1980	Homeward Bound	Vernon Richards	TV movie
1981	Midnight Lace	S.W.A.T. Commander	TV movie
1981	Bitter Harvest	Doc	TV movie
1981	The Princess and the Cabbie	Executive	TV movie
1982	Knight Rider	Frank Reston	1 episode
1983	Seven Brides for Seven Brothers	Reed	1 episode
1983	Blood Feud	Ned Tuckmill	TV movie
1984	Brothers	Ed	1 episode
1984	Booker	Wheeler	TV movie
1984	Highway to Heaven	Deke Larson Sr.	2 episodes
1985	A Death in California	Dob Fowler	2 episodes
1985	Hill Street Blues	Flynn	2 episodes
1985	Toughlove	Lloyd	TV movie
1986	Moonlighting	Kyle	1 episode
1986	Kung Fu: The Movie	Federal Marshal	TV movie
1986	CBS Schoolbreak Special	Alfred Newton	1 episode
1986	Brotherhood of Justice	Sheriff	TV movie
1986	Rowdies	Potts	TV movie
1986-1987	Dallas	Garrett Gordon	7 episodes
1987	Falcon Crest	Jake	1 episode
1987	Three on a Match	Unknown	TV movie
1987	Once a Hero	Davy Crockett (uncredited)	1 episode
1987	Take Five	Lenny Goodman	6 episodes
1989	Midnight Caller	Prison Warden	1 episode
1989	I Know My First Name Is Steven	Officer Scott	Miniseries
1989	Hooperman	Max	1 episode
1989	L.A. Law	Judge Nelson Dunley	1 episode
1990	The Image	David Hartzfield	TV movie
1990	Snoops	Sheriff Garfield Weams	1 episode
1991	The Young Riders	Father Peter Riley	1 episode
1991	Hell Hath No Fury	Cantrell	TV movie
1992	I'll Fly Away	Unknown	1 episode
1992	Matlock	Captain Chris Lewis	1 episode
1992	The Boys of Twilight	Marshal Nolan	1 episode
1992	Northern Exposure	Gillis Toomey	1 episode
1992	Quantum Leap	Sheriff John Hoyt	1 episode
1993	Kiss of a Killer	Unknown	TV movie
1993	Crossroads	Sheriff Ford	1 episode
1993	Star	Tad Wyatt	TV movie
1993	The Odd Couple Together Again	Gil	TV movie
1993	Bakersfield P.D.	Jefferson K. Wallace	1 episode
1994	Armed and Innocent	Brad St. Clair	TV movie
1994	Betrayed by Love	Byron Estes	TV movie
1994	The Stand	Deputy Kingsolving	Miniseries
1995	Empty Nest	"Grit" Higby	2 episodes
1995	Ellen	Jake Hilfiger	1 episode
1996	The Lazarus Man	Unknown	1 episode
1997	Desert's Edge	Unknown	TV movie
1997	The Pretender	Ben Miller	2 episodes
1998	Michael Hayes	US Congressman Borman	1 episode
1998	Chicago Hope	Nelson Hickes	1 episode
2001	Family Law	Unknown	1 episode
2002	Titus	Floyd	1 episode
2004	The Parkers	Tom	1 episode
2005	The King of Queens	Ed	1 episode
2006	Commander in Chief	Bill Pasternak	1 episode
2006	Close to Home	Archie Waters	1 episode
2007	Avenging Angel	Elijah	TV movie
2008	ER	Ophthalmologist	1 episode
2010	Saving Grace	Dr. Kennedy	1 episode
2010-2012	Justified	Lemuel Briggs	2 episodes
2016	The Mop and the Lucky Files	Carl	2 episodes
