= Rudi Gernreich =

Austrian-born American fashion designer (1922–1985)

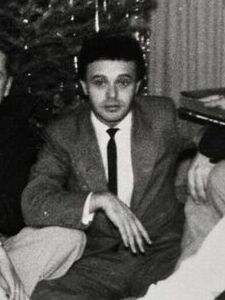
- Gernreich at a Mattachine Society meeting, 1951
- Born: Rudolf Gernreich; August 8, 1922; Vienna, Austria
- Died: April 21, 1985 (aged 62); Los Angeles, California, US
- Education: Los Angeles City College
- Occupation: Fashion designer
- Years active: 1950–1985
- Known for: Designer of the monokini Avant-garde clothing designs Early supporter of the Mattachine Society
- Partner(s): Harry Hay (1950–1952); Oreste Pucciani (1953–1985; Gernreich's death)

Rudolf "Rudi" Gernreich (August 8, 1922 – April 21, 1985) was an Austrian-born American fashion designer whose avant-garde clothing designs are generally regarded as the most innovative and dynamic fashion of the 1960s. He purposefully used fashion design as a social statement to advance sexual freedom, producing clothes that followed the natural form of the female body, freeing them from the constraints of high fashion.

He was known for the early use of vinyl and plastic in clothing, and for his use of cutouts. He designed the first thong bathing suit, unisex clothing, the first swimsuit without a built-in bra, the minimalist, soft, transparent No Bra, and the topless monokini. He was a four-time recipient of the Coty American Fashion Critics Award. He produced what is regarded as the first fashion video, Basic Black: William Claxton w/Peggy Moffitt, in 1966. He had a long, unconventional, and trend-setting career in fashion design.

He was a founding member of and financially supported the early activities of the Mattachine Society. He consciously pushed the boundaries of acceptable fashion and used his designs as an opportunity to comment on social issues and to expand society's perception of what was acceptable.

== Early years ==
Gernreich was the only child of Siegmund Gernreich and Elisabeth (née Müller) Gernreich, a Jewish couple who lived in Vienna, Austria. His father was a stocking manufacturer who had served in World War I and who died by suicide when Gernreich was eight years old.

Gernreich learned about high fashion from his aunt, Hedwig Müller, who with her husband Oskar Jellinek, owned a dress shop. He spent many hours in his aunt's shop sketching her designs for Viennese high society and learned about fabrics. He also gained early impressions of sexuality. He later told one of his favorite models, Leon Bing, about images of "leather chaps with a strap running between the buttocks of street laborers' work pants and the white flesh of women's thighs above gartered black stockings." When he was 12, Austrian designer Ladislaus Czettel saw his sketches and offered Gernreich a fashion apprenticeship in London, but his mother refused, believing her son was too young to leave home.

=== Jewish refugee ===
After the German Anschluss (when Nazi Germany annexed Austria) on 12 March 1938, Hitler, among many other acts, banned nudity. Austrian citizens were advocates of exercising nude, a rejection of the over-civilized world. His mother took 16-year-old Rudi and escaped to the United States as Jewish refugees, settling in Los Angeles, California. To survive, his mother baked pastries that Rudi sold door-to-door. His first job was washing bodies to prepare them for autopsy in the morgue of Cedars of Lebanon Hospital. He told Marylou Luther, "I grew up overnight. I do smile sometimes when people tell me my clothes are so body-conscious [that] I must have studied anatomy. You bet I studied anatomy." He attended Los Angeles City College, where he studied art and apprenticed for a Seventh Avenue clothing manufacturer. He attended Los Angeles City College from 1938 to 1941, and the Los Angeles Art Center School from 1941 to 1942.

== Career ==
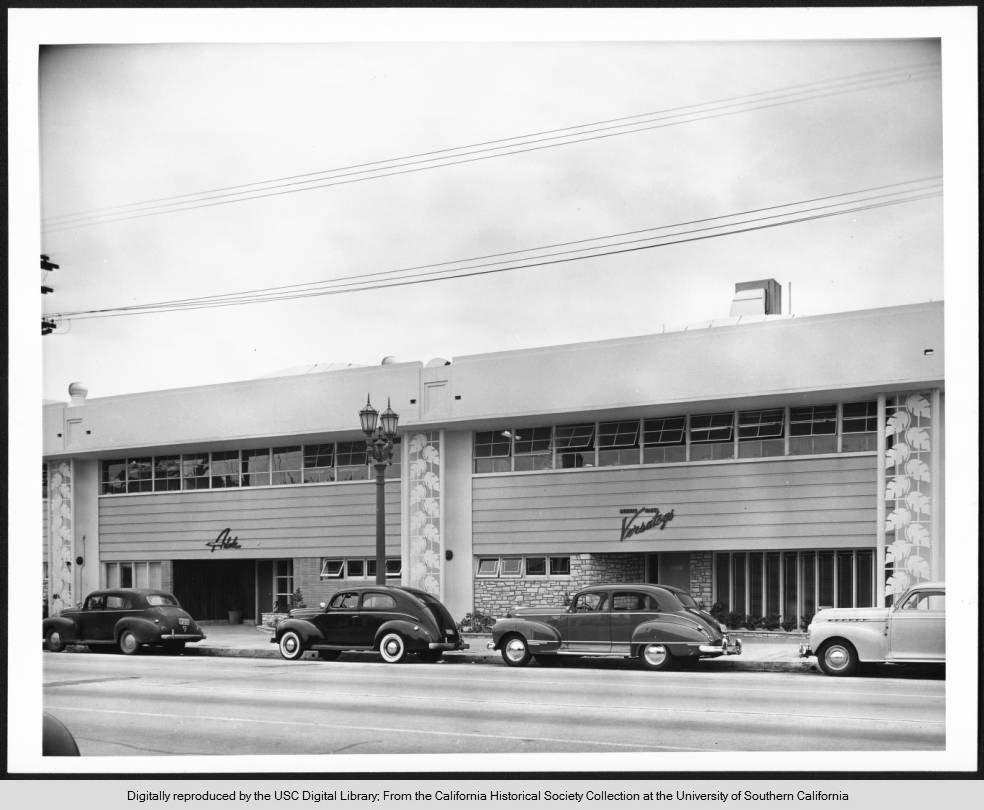
Morris Nagel Versatogs and Adele California were well-known clothing design houses in Southern California. The two companies occupied adjoining buildings in 1948 at 2615 - 2609 South Hill Street in Los Angeles.

He briefly worked in Hollywood costume design, but hated it. In 1942, he joined the Lester Horton's modern dance company as both a dancer and designer. Gernreich said "I never was a very good dancer ... I wanted to become a choreographer, but that never happened." Of his time with the Theater, Gernreich said that dancing made him "aware of what clothes did to the rest of the body." He also designed freelance but left Lester Horton in 1948 and became a fabric salesman for Hoffman Company. Gernreich moved into fashion design from fabric design.

The fashion climate at that time was dictated by designers in Paris. In 1949 he briefly worked in New York at George Carmel but didn't like the position because he felt pressured to imitate Parisian fashion. Gernreich said, "Everyone with a degree of talent was motivated by a level of high taste and unquestioned loyalty to Paris. Dior, Fath, Balenciaga were gods—kings. You could not deviate from their look."

In 1951, still attempting to gain entry into the fashion world, Gernreich got a job with Morris Nagel to design for Versatogs, but Nagel required Gernreich to stick to the Versatogs design formula, which Gernreich hated.

He began designing his own line of clothes in Los Angeles and New York until 1951, when fellow Viennese immigrant Walter Bass in Beverly Hills convinced him to sign a seven-year contract with him. William Bass Inc. produced a collection of dresses that they sold to Jack Hanson, the owner of Jax, an emerging Los Angeles boutique that focused on avant-garde clothing that was fun and adventuresome. He also designed costumes for Lester Horton until 1952. For most of the 1950s, he collaborated with Hungarian Holocaust survivor and immigrant Renée Firestone in Los Angeles, before she started her own line in 1960.

In 1955, he began designing swimwear for Westwood Knitting Mills in Los Angeles. They hired him in 1959 as the swimwear designer. Genesco Corporation also hired him as a shoe designer in 1959. He completed his seven-year contract with Walter Bass in 1960 and founded his firm G.R. Designs in Los Angeles. He changed his company's name to Rudi Gernreich Inc. in 1964. His designs were featured in what is generally regarded as the first fashion video, Basic Black: William Claxton w/Peggy Moffitt, in 1966.

In the early 1960s, Gernreich opened a Seventh Avenue showroom in New York City where he showed his popular designs for Harmon knitwear and his own more expensive line of experimental garments. Gernreich wanted his designs to be affordable and in 1966, he broke American fashion's unwritten rule that name designers don't sell to chain stores. On January 3, 1966, he took the unprecedented action of signing a contract with Montgomery Ward, a chain store. Rudi's fashions proved popular and lasted several seasons, showing that original designs would sell at popular prices.

In 1966, Gernreich was named one of the "fashion revolutionaries" in New York by Women's Wear Daily, alongside Edie Sedgwick, Tiger Morse, Pierre Cardin, Paco Rabanne, Baby Jane Holzer, André Courrèges, Emanuel Ungaro, Yves Saint Laurent, and Mary Quant.

Unisex costume design for Moonbase Alpha (Space: 1999) by Rudi Gernreich.

He designed the Moonbase Alpha uniforms worn by the main characters of the 1970s British science-fiction television series Space: 1999, pushing the boundaries of the futuristic look in clothing over the course of three decades.

=== Fashion as social commentary ===
Gernreich developed strong feelings about society's sexualization of the human body and disagreed with religious and social beliefs that the body was essentially shameful. He wanted to reduce the stigma of a naked body, to "cure our society of its sex hang up," as he put it. Gerneich stated, "To me, the only respect you can give to a woman is to make her a human being. A totally emancipated woman who is totally free."

Gernreich approached fashion as a social commentary. He said, "I realized you could say things with clothes." Editors of Life magazine asked him to envision clothes in the future for its January 1, 1970, issue, and he produced designs of minimalist, unisex garments that could be worn by either men or women. He said he wanted to create a "utility principle" that would "take our mind off how we look and concentrate on really important matters." Fashion writer Marylou Luther, who became a good friend of Gernreich, wrote that he had two motives in his designs: one was to create modern fashion "for the 20th century and beyond," and the other was as "a social commentator, who just happened to work in the medium of clothes." Gernreich purposefully used his designs to advance his socio-political views.

=== Impact on fashion design ===
During his career, he was compared in influence to these same fashion houses: Balenciaga, Dior, and André Courrèges, but he steadfastly refused to show his designs in Paris. Instead, he named Claire McCardell as his influence. Gernreich developed a reputation as an avant-garde designer who broke many design rules. As a former dancer, Gernreich was interested in liberating the body from the limitations of clothing. In 1952, while designing for Westwood, he introduced the first swimsuit without a built-in bra. Most swimsuits at the time had stiff inner construction with boned linings. His designs used elasticized wool knits that clung to the woman's body.

In its December 1962 issue, Sports Illustrated remarked, "He has turned the dancer's leotard into a swimsuit that frees the body. In the process, he has ripped out the boning and wiring that made American swimsuits seagoing corsets". He was regarded as the designer who freed women from the limits of high fashion by creating vibrant, young, "often daring clothing that followed the natural form of the female body."

Gernreich is regarded by some as the "most innovative and dynamic fashion designers of the 20th century." In 1964, he created the first topless swimsuit, which he called the "monokini". Gernreich was featured on the cover of Time in December 1967 with models Peggy Moffitt and Leon Bing. The magazine described him as "the most way-out, far-ahead designer in the U.S."

Cynthia Amnéus, Chief Curator and Curator of Fashion and Textiles at the Cincinnati Art Museum in Ohio, said "Rudi was one of the most important and visionary American fashion designers of the 21st century ... Rudi was doing very shocking and avant-garde things, like taking all the structure out of swimwear, and creating a trapeze dress in the 1950s way before Yves Saint Laurent did."

He worked closely with model Peggy Moffitt and her husband and photographer William Claxton for many years, pushing the boundaries of the "futuristic look" in clothing over the course of three decades. His work paired minimalist designs with bright, psychedelic colors and strong geometric patterns, pushing the boundaries of contemporary women's clothing. Moffitt increased the notoriety of his designs with avant-garde makeup and haircuts.

He was the sixth American designer to be elected to the Coty American Fashion Hall of Fame. He designed the first see-through chiffon blouse, fashioned clothes from leotards and tights, decorated them with zippers and dog leash clasps, and in 1970 introduced the idea of unisex clothing that was minimalist, utilitarian, and optional, including men's suits and hats for women. He showed his designs on a male and female model who were both shaved. He designed coordinated outfits of dresses, handbags, hats, and stockings. He was among the first to regularly use vinyl and plastic in clothes, used cut-out details, and designed the first soft, transparent bra — the No Bra.

In 1974, in response to Los Angeles banning nude beaches, he designed and named the first thong bathing suit that exposed the buttocks for both men and women. Gernreich patented the thong design but gave up enforcing his rights due to legal difficulties. From 1970 to 1971 he designed furnishings for Fortress and Knoll International, and in 1975 he designed men's style underwear for Lily of France.

The next year he worked on cosmetics for Redken and costumes for the Bella Lewitzky Dance Company, along with kitchen accessories and ceramic bathroom accessories. Gernreich continued to collaborate with Lewitzky, designing sets and costumes for Pas de Bach in 1977, Rituals in 1979, Changes & Choices in 1981, and Confines in 1982, all danced by the WCK3.

=== Monokini ===
Gernreich is most well known for his design of the first topless swimsuit, which he called the "Monokini". Gernreich conceived the Monokini at the end of 1963, after Susanne Kirtland of Look called Gernreich and asked him to draw a suit to accompany a trend story along futuristic lines. That month he first envisioned a topless swimsuit that became the Monokini. The Monokini bottom was similar to a maillot swimsuit style but ended at mid-torso and was supported by two straps between the breasts and around the neck.

When Claxton's photograph of his wife Peggy Moffitt modeling the design was published in Women's Wear Daily on June 4, 1964, it generated a great deal of controversy in the United States and other countries. Moffitt said the design was a logical evolution of Gernreich's avant-garde ideas in swimwear design as much as a scandalous symbol of the permissive society. He saw the swimsuit as a protest against repressive society. He predicted that "bosom will be uncovered within five years". He saw baring of a woman's breasts as a form of freedom.

He initially did not intend to produce the design commercially, but Kirtland of Look urged him to make it available to the public. "I thought we'd sell only six or seven, but I decided to design it anyway." Moffitt later said that the Monokini "was a political statement. It wasn't meant to be worn in public."

In January, 1965, he told Gloria Steinem in an interview that despite the criticism he'd do it again.

A designer stands or falls on the totality of each year's collection, not just one item. At the moment, this topless business has done nothing but take away from my work, but in the end, I'm sure having my name known internationally will be a help. But that isn't why I'd do it again. I'd do it again because I think the topless, by overstating and exaggerating a new freedom of the body, will make the moderate, right degree of freedom more acceptable.

He later designed the "pubikini"—a bikini bottom with a window in front that revealed the model's dyed and shaped pubic hair.

=== No Bra ===
Gernreich preferred that his designs should be worn braless, and in October 1964, at the request the brassiere manufacturer Exquisite Form, Gernreich announced the "No Bra". The bra was made of sheer fabric without underwires or lining of any kind. Unlike contemporary bras, his design allowed breasts to assume their natural shape, rather than being molded into an aesthetic ideal.

It was a soft-cup, light-weight, seamless, sheer nylon tricot and elastic bra only available for small-breasted women. It came in three sheer colors: powder puff, black, and white, and in sizes 32 to 36, A and B cups. It had a single hook in the back.

The No Bra was a big departure from the sculpted, bullet-shaped bosom of the previous decade. It was quite similar to the original bra of the 1920s and like the first modern bra invented by Mary Phelps Jacob, two handkerchiefs attached to a band and tied around the chest. Gernreich's no-bra was little more than that. Both the 1920s and the 1960s celebrated the stick-like figure of adolescence, and with that meant small, flat breasts.

His minimalist bra revolutionized brassiere design, initiating a trend toward more natural shapes and soft, sheer fabrics.

The retail success of the No Bra was followed in 1965 with the next design, a "no-side" bra to accommodate dresses with deep armholes. It had a narrow stretch band around the torso that allowed women to wear open-sleeved garments without displaying a bra band. The sheer cups were cut part of the bias and part of the half-bias. He also produced a "No Front" maillot design with a deep, plunging front for slit-to-the-waist necklines, and a "No-Back" long-line version that was anchored using contoured stretch-waistband that allowed a woman to wear a backless dress.

=== Exhibitions ===
Rudi exhibited his fashion at the Fashion Institute of Technology in New York in 1967, "Two Modern Artists of Dress: Elizabeth Hawes and Rudi Gernreich". A retrospective titled "Fashion Will Go Out of Fashion" was assembled in Kunstlerhaus Graz, Austria, in 2000. In 2003, an exhibition of his work held at the Phoenix Art Museum, in Phoenix, Arizona, hailed him as one of the most original, prophetic, and controversial American designers of the 1950s through to the 1970s. In 2019, the Skirball Cultural Center in Los Angeles created Fearless Fashion: Rudi Gernreich, a major exhibition detailing Gernreich's life and career.

=== Awards and recognition ===
Gernreich received his first design award in 1956, a junior award from Sports Illustrated. They awarded him the American Sportswear Design Award for his design of a black-and-white check wool jersey tank suit with no built-in bra. He won the Wool Knit Association award in 1960. In 1963, Gernreich won two major awards: in May he received Sports Illustrated's Sporting Look Award and in June he was awarded the Coty American Fashion Critics Award. The Coty Award stirred a controversy when the first recipient of the award, Norman Norell, gave his Coty Award back as a protest against Gernreich's recognition. Norell told Women's Wear Daily, "It no longer means a thing to me. I can't bear to look at it anymore. I saw a photograph of a suit of Rudi's and one lapel of the jacket was shawl and the other was notched—well!" He blamed the vote on "jury members from Glamour and Seventeen who don't get around to high fashion collections are responsible for the Gernreich vote." In response to Norell's protest, the Bonwit Teller department store ran a half-page ad with the headline: "Rudi Gernreich, we'd give you the Coty Award all over again!" He received the award again in 1963, 1966, and 1967.

Additional awards included the Neiman Marcus award, Dallas, 1961; Sporting Look award, 1963; Sunday Times International Fashion Award, London, 1965; Filene's Design award, Boston, 1966; Knitted Textile Association award, 1975; Council of Fashion Designers of America Special Tribute, 1985. Marylou Luther, the Los Angeles Times fashion editor, wrote, "To most of the people in the fashion industry, he was considered the most inventive designer of these times."

In 1985 Tom Bradley, the Mayor of the City of Los Angeles, proclaimed August 13 as 'Rudi Gernreich Day' in recognition of Gernreich's contributions to fashion and Los Angeles, declaring "His designs were social commentary and forecast on our times and the future lifestyles of our nation."

On April 2, 2012, Time magazine named him to its list of the "All-TIME 100 Fashion Icons". In 2000, the city of New York placed bronze plaques honoring American fashion designers, including Gernreich, along Seventh Avenue.

=== Later life ===
In his later life, Gernreich devoted himself to gourmet soups. He is credited with a recipe for red pepper soup, a cold soup served in red pepper cases and garnished with caviar and lemon.

== Personal life ==
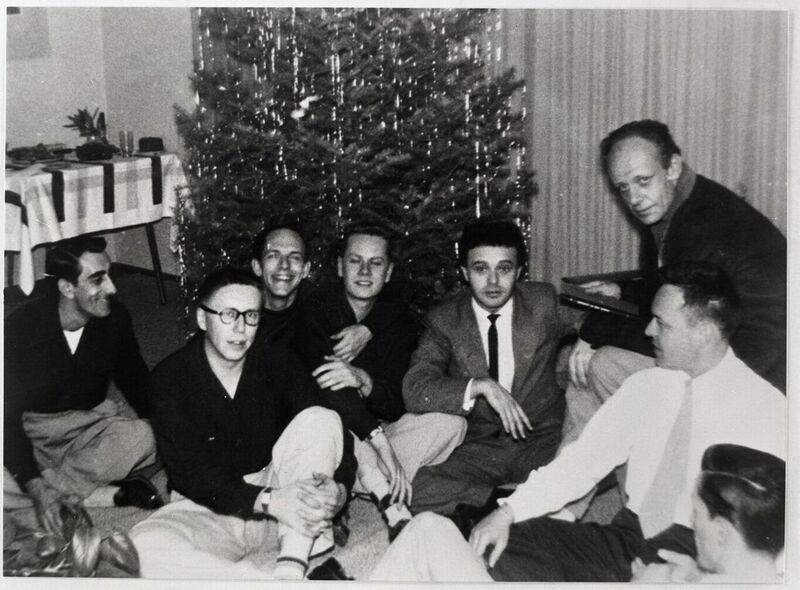
The Mattachine Society, 1951. Rudi Gernreich, in white shirt & dark jacket, is third from the right

Gernreich became a U.S. citizen in 1943. He met Los Angeles-based Communist and gay rights activist Harry Hay in July 1950, and the two became lovers. Hay showed Gernreich The Call, a document outlining his plan for a gay support organization, and Gernreich told him, "You know that I'm an Austrian refugee. This is the most dangerous thing I have ever read. And, yes, I'm with you 100 percent." In 1951 Gernreich was arrested and convicted in a police homosexual entrapment case, which was common in Southern California at that time.

Gernreich was a founding member of and an enthusiastic financial supporter of the Mattachine Society, though privately, preferring to be known by the initial "R". Gernreich ended the relationship with Hay in 1952.

In 1953, Gernreich met Oreste Pucciani, future chairman of the UCLA French department, who was a key figure in bringing Jean-Paul Sartre to the attention of American educators. Oreste Pucciani was also a pivotal figure in the gay rights movement. The two men kept their relationship private as Gernreich believed public acknowledgment of his homosexuality would negatively affect his fashion business.

Gernreich never announced his sexual orientation. Moffit said, "He just thought his sexuality was obvious." Gernreich typically wore a toupee, Gucci loafers, and jumpsuits with industrial zippers and drove a white Bentley around West Hollywood, where he lived with Pucciani until he died. Gernreich was diagnosed with lung cancer in January 1985 and died on April 21, 1985, at age 62. Oreste Pucciani, Gernreich's partner for 31 years, endowed a trust in their name for the American Civil Liberties Union in 1988.

== In popular culture ==
In 1967, he portrayed himself on an episode of the TV series Batman, along with Eartha Kitt as Catwoman, entitled “Catwoman’s Dressed To Kill” (S3E14).

In 2009, Gernreich and the Mattachine Society became the subjects of the play The Temperamentals by Jon Maran. After workshop performances in 2009, the play opened off-Broadway at New World Stages in February 2010. Actor Michael Urie, who performed the role of Gernreich, received a Lucille Lortel Award for Outstanding Lead Actor.

After his death due to lung cancer, Moffitt retained the trademark on Gernreich's name. In 2003, she signed a contract to re-create his designs with Rei Kawakubo, an avant-garde Japanese designer under her Comme des Garcons label. Some designs were reissued under the Peggy Moffitt/Comme des Garçons label. In 2012, Women's Wear Daily reported that a German investor had committed to reissuing some of Gernreich's designs.

The New York Metropolitan Museum of Art contains more than 100 pieces of Gernreich's designs in its collection.

A knit coat dress was sold at auction for $1,245 in 2008 at Christie's. Doyle's holds the record for Gernreich, set in 2002: $8,500 for two minidresses with peekaboo vinyl inserts. On October 30, 2008, one of Gernreich's original retail monokini was auctioned by Christie's for £1,250 ($2,075).
