= Yrjönkatu Swimming Hall =

Indoor swimming hall in Helsinki, Finland

Coordinates: 60°10′4.83″N 24°56′20.47″E

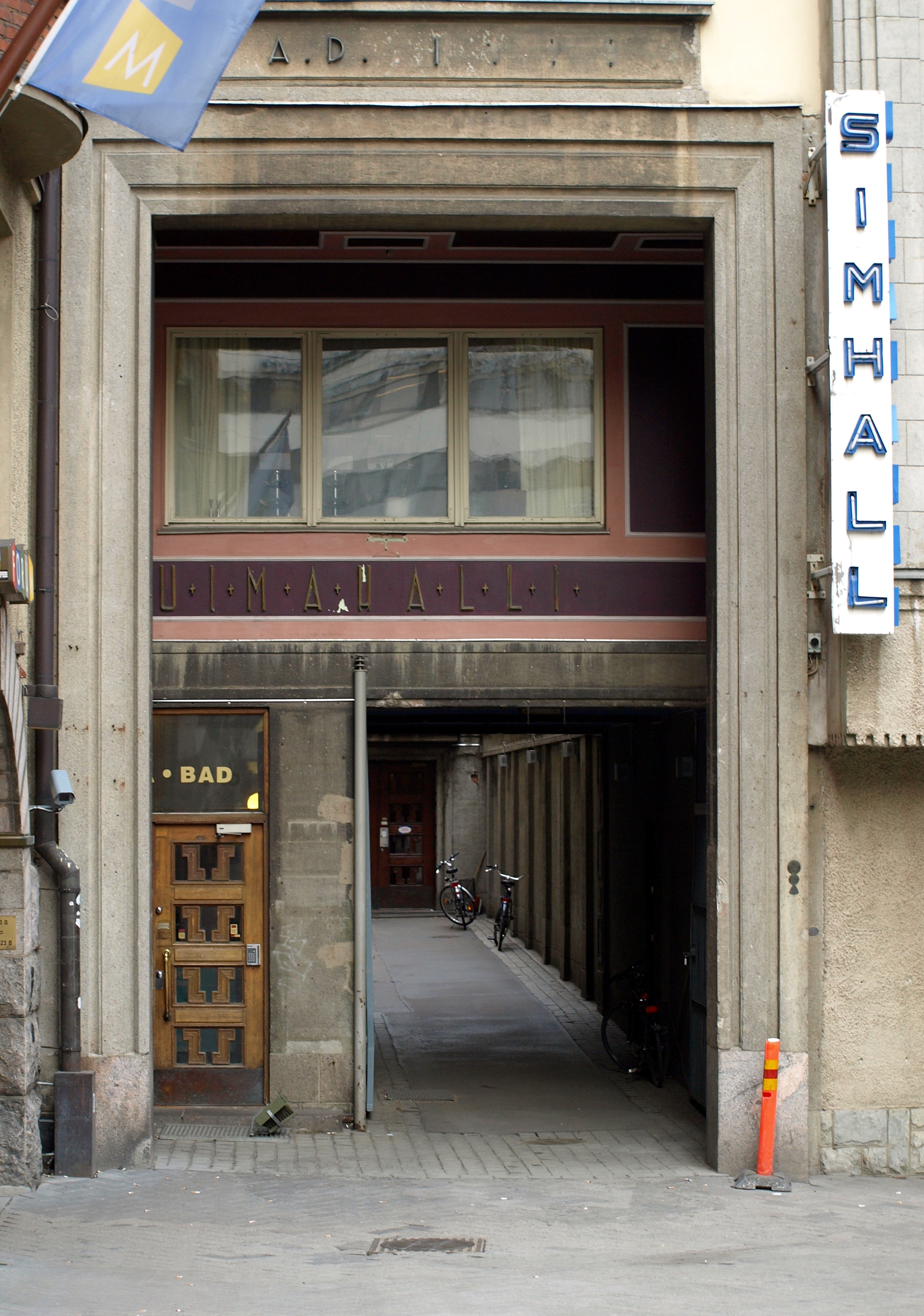
The entrance to the swimming hall.

The Yrjönkatu Swimming Hall is the first and oldest public indoor swimming hall in Finland. It was inaugurated on 4 June 1928, and was for a long period the only indoor swimming pool in Finland. The pool is located in the Kamppi area of Helsinki at Yrjönkatu 21b, and is owned by the city of Helsinki.

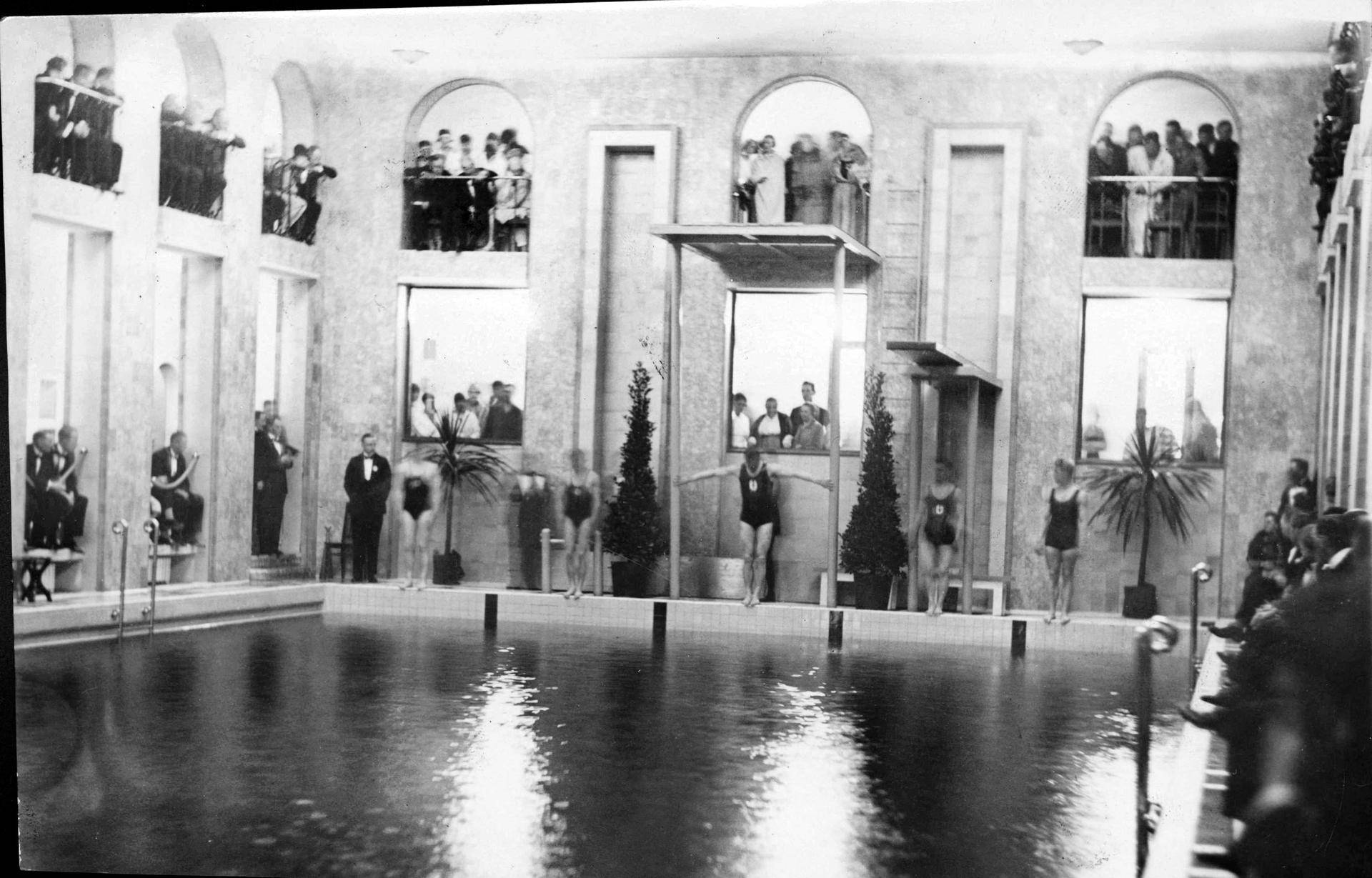
Yrjönkatu Swimming Hall photographed on its opening day on June 4, 1928

The hall building was designed by architect Väinö Vähäkallio and represents the Nordic Classicism style. It was inspired by the Centralbadet swimming hall in Stockholm. The hall was originally privately owned, but was transferred to the Finnish Sports Federation in 1954 and to the city of Helsinki in 1967. The hall was renovated from 1997 to 1999.

The Yrjönkatu Swimming Hall's first floor contains a 25 × 10 metre pool, two saunas and dressing closets at the edges of the pool. The second floor contains resting cabins, saunas and a café. The hall sells two kinds of tickets, providing access either to the first floor only or to both floors. Traditionally, people swam naked in the pool, but since 2001, the wearing of a swimsuit has been permitted. Men and women have separate days for swimming. In March 2012, the hall reported it was switching its original 1928 wooden sauna stove to a new one to cut down on the smoke damages to the Forum building. The new wooden sauna stove became operational in August 2013. It is 2.8 metres high and is thought to be one of the largest wooden sauna stoves in Finland.
