= William Claxton (photographer) =

American photographer and author (1927–2008)

- Born: William James Claxton; October 12, 1927; Pasadena, California, U.S.
- Died: October 11, 2008 (aged 80); Los Angeles, California, U.S.
- Education: University of California, Los Angeles
- Spouse: Peggy Moffitt (m. 1960)
- Children: 1

William James Claxton (October 12, 1927 – October 11, 2008) was an American photographer and author.

== Biography ==
Born in Pasadena, California, Claxton's works included a book of photographs of Steve McQueen, and Jazzlife, a book of photographs depicting jazz artists in the 1960s. He was best known for his photography of jazz musicians including Chet Baker. Claxton also photographed celebrities and models.

In 1967, he created the film Basic Black, a work that is credited as the first "fashion video" and is in the collection of the Museum of Modern Art in New York. The music for the film, using a Moog synthesizer, was composed by award-winning artist David Lucas.

He married model Peggy Moffitt in 1960 and had one son, Christopher M. Claxton, born in 1973. Claxton died on October 11, 2008, of complications from congestive heart failure, one day before his 81st birthday.

== Bibliography ==
- Claxton, William (1987). Jazz. Twelvetrees. ISBN 978-0942642285.
- Claxton, William (1999). Young Chet. teNeues. ISBN 978-3823899662.
- Claxton, William; Gavin, James (1999). Claxography: The Art of Jazz Photography. Distributed Art Publishers. ISBN 978-3926048677.
- Claxton, William; Crist, Steve; Berendt, Joachim E. (2005). Jazzlife. Taschen. ISBN 978-3822830666.
- Claxton, William (2008). Crist, Steve (ed.). Steve McQueen. Taschen. ISBN 978-3836503914.
