= List of social nudity places in South America =

This is a list of social nudity places in South America used for recreation.

== Nude beaches ==
This list includes topfree beaches, clothing-optional beaches (or nude beaches) and some resorts. Topfree beaches allow women to sunbathe without a bikini top or other clothing above the waist. Clothing-optional beaches allow either sex to sunbathe with or without clothing above or below the waist. A nude beach may also be an obligatory nude area, which means that both sexes are obliged to go without clothing above as well as below the waist.

=== Argentina ===
- Buenos Aires: Playa Escondida, a nude beach (Note: Playa Escondida located at 38°13′35″S 57°43′35″W) about 25 kilometres (16 mi) south of Mar del Plata
- Moreno: Eden Guesthouse
- Villa Gesell: Playa Querandí

=== Brazil ===
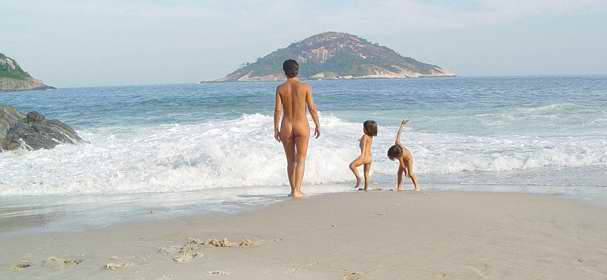
Family in Brazil, Praia do Abricó

Public nudity is a misdemeanor in Brazil, except in places officially designated by the local authority.

Bahia

- Massarandupió, about 100 kilometres (62 mi) north of Salvador
- Praia do Encanto, south of Tinharé Island and Morro de São Paulo

Espírito Santo

- Barra Seca, about 60 kilometres (37 mi) north of Linhares

Paraíba

- Tambaba

Rio de Janeiro

- Jurubá, Paraty
- Olho de Boi (Bull's Eye Beach), Búzios (Note: Location of Olho de Boi beach 22°45′18″S 41°51′54″W)
- Praia Brava, Cabo Frio, north of Rio
- Praia Brava, Trindade, south of Rio
- Praia do Abricó, west of Rio

Santa Catarina

- Pedras Altas, between Florianópolis and Garopaba
- Praia da Galheta, east coast of Florianópolis
- Praia do Pinho, next to Balneário Camboriú near Florianópolis (Note: Praia do Pinho is located at 27°01′14″S 48°34′33″W)

São Paulo

Although there are no official nude beaches throughout the state of São Paulo, naturism is commonly practiced in the following areas:

- Praia Branca, Guarujá
- Praia Brava, Caraguatatuba
- Praia Brava, São Sebastião
- Praia da Desertinha, Peruíbe
- Praia da Lagoa, Ubatuba
- Praia do Alto, Ubatuba
- Praia do Camburí, Guarujá
- Praia do Éden, Guarujá
- Praia Mansa, Ubatuba
- Praia Preta, Guarujá

Note: Copacabana Beach in Rio de Janeiro is not a nude beach, despite its depiction as such in the 1984 motion picture Blame It on Rio.

=== Chile ===
- Playa Chorrillos, Pichilemu, O'Higgins Region
- Playa Corazones in Arica has long been a site for nudists. In the 1990s, attempts were made to make it an official nudist beach, but these attempts failed due to the intervention of the local churches.
- Playa Escondida, Antofagasta (not an official nudist beach but nudity is tolerated there)
- Playa La Pancora, near Punta de Lobos, Pichilemu
- Playa Luna, Caleta Horcón, near Puchuncaví, Valparaiso Province
- Playa Luna Norte, near Iquique, Tarapaca Region
- Playa Luna Sur, Coliumo, near Tomé and Concepción, Biobio Region

=== Colombia ===
- Tayrona Park, west of Cabo San Juan, has nude section

=== Peru ===
- Puerto Bonito, about 72 kilometres (45 mi) south of Lima

=== Uruguay ===
- Chihuahua Beach in Maldonado
- La Sirena Beach in Aguas Dulces

=== Venezuela ===
- Cayos de Morrocoy (in a few of the cays), Isla de Margarita
- Playa Acuarela
- Playa El Agua
- Playa El Diario, near Choroní
- Playa Grande, near Choroní
- Playa Kapino, near Chuspa
- Playa Miami, near Laguna de Tacarigua
- Playa Mono Manso, near Chuspa
- Playa Yaguarita, near Chuspa

== Resorts and pools ==
Unlike public beaches, these are private properties that allow the public.

=== Argentina ===
- La Pachamama in Moreno
- Ruca Chauke in Rosario
- Yatan Rumi near Tanti, Córdoba Province, a naturist reserve located in the nearby mountains with 1,200 hectares

=== Brazil ===
Bahia

- Ecovila da Mata, Entre Rios
- Encantos de Massarandupió, Entre Rios
- Pousada Rio e Mar, Massarandupió Beach, Entre Rios
- Quinta das Flores, Entre Rios

Paraíba

- Pousada Villamor, Coqueirinho Beach, Jacumã, near Tambaba nude beach

Rio de Janeiro

- Recanto Paraíso Naturist Resort in the municipality of Piraí

Rio Grande do Sul

- Hotel Ocara, in the municipality of Colinas do Sul

São Paulo

- Rincão Naturista Clube, Rincão

=== Colombia ===
- The Naked House, male-only

=== Uruguay ===
- Chihuahua Resort (Chihuahua)

== See also ==
- List of places where social nudity is practised
- List of social nudity places in North America
