= Naturism in Uruguay =

Naturism in Uruguay (or nudism in Uruguay) is practiced at least since the 1960s, firstly by foreigners coming to Uruguay and later by Uruguayan naturists. It is being practiced on the two officially designated naturist beaches (authorized by the respective departmental governments): Chihuahua beach in Maldonado that is the most known, and the other is La Sirena Beach in Rocha.

== Naturism and Uruguayan society ==
Naturism was practiced since the 1960s years in Chihuahua, where foreign people used to attend, and the beach was even better known overseas rather than by the Uruguayan themselves, already appearing in the 1976 international guide printed by the International Naturist Federation.

The people attending the naturist beaches are wide-ranging, including families with children, young people with their friends, or elder people. There is also a presence of LGBT people.

According to Carlos Lucas, member of the Uruguayan Naturist and Nudist Association, during an interview in November 2018, said that the Uruguayan society is not yet ready to embrace nudism.

In 2013 a woman insulted nudists that were in Chihuahua beach and moved by herself the public demarcation signs indicating the naturist beach boundary (put due to departmental ruling) trying to reduce the naturist beach extension. This incident was reported to the Maldonado Department authorities. A Uruguayan Naturist and Nudist Association representative told that this kind of incidents occurs from time to time, involving some neighbours with real estate in the resort town, or real estate agencies that, according to the local hotel owner and naturist Ricardo Rodal, thought that naturism was going to depreciate the real estate value. However, according to then director of Environment of Maldonado government Bethy Molina, this did not turn out to be true, because the prices of Chihuahua properties began to raise.

== Social organizations ==
In 1994 the Uruguayan Naturism Association (Asociación Uruguaya de Naturismo, AUDEN) was established, headquartered in Chihuahua, aiming to get Chihuahua beach officially designated as a naturist beach. In 2009 the Uruguayan Naturist and Nudist Association (Asociación Uruguaya Nudista Naturista, AUNNA) was established in order to organize Uruguayan nudists and naturists, (Note: Some sources mention this organization as "Asociación Uruguaya de Nudismo y Naturismo".) following up the work being done by AUDEN. AUNNA is a correspondent member of the International Naturist Federation, acting as the representative organization of Uruguay at this international organization.

== Nudist locations ==
=== Official nudist destinations ===
==== Chihuahua Beach ====
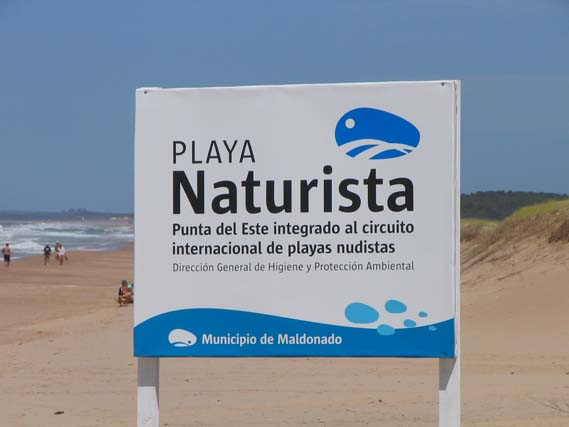
Entrance sign of the naturist beach of Chihuahua

Chihuahua Beach is located at the coast of Chihuahua resort town, and is the first officially authorized naturist beach by the government of Maldonado Department and the Ministry of Tourism in 2000. It extends from the mouth of El Potrero stream until the kilometer 115.5 mark of National Route 10.

Although its official designation was made in 2000, there were already nudists since the 1960s, attending foreign personalities, such as Argentines who owned real estate nearby. By the 1970s, the Argentine citizen Benjamín Volco bought the adjacent lands and developed the town of Chihuahua, and also planted pine and acacia trees. In 1980 years, after news reports from La Razón and Clarín agencies from Argentina, helicopters from Argentine media came trying to take pictures and record from the sky the beach and its bathers, until that time a very private location. Around that time the Uruguayan Coast Guard started to perform raids against bathers requiring them to dress otherwise they would be subject to fines or criminal procedures. Since then a pro-naturism activism arose, and also new naturist hotels were established. In 2000 Chihuahua receives the official designation as a naturist beach.

Due to it lacked an official demarcation since its official designation, in 2012 the government of Maldonado issued the resolution 7823/2012 by which its boundaries were delimited, in the east the imaginary line to the south of the main avenue axis, central street of the semicircle of the land development, with the extreme was near the beach; to the west the left bank of El Potrero stream and its mouth to the River Plate; and to the north the dunes hills. This demarcation turned out to be reducing the beach coverage in the most visited part, what led to protests from the Uruguayan Nudism and Naturist Association. This controversy ended after the departmental government revoked that ruling and issued a new one, 8839/2012, that defined a wider boundary to the east side, in the imaginary projection of the axis of El Foque street to the south, near the entrance to the beach of vehicles.

==== La Sirena Beach ====
La Sirena Beach is located at the coast of Rocha Department, two kilometers northeast from Aguas Dulces resort town, designated by Rocha government as an official naturist destination to practise nudism and naturism as a clothing-optional beach.

It is a wide beach of thin sand in front of the Atlantic Ocean, surrounded by sand dunes covered with vegetation, including wetlands, ponds and small forests. Unlike Chihuahua beach, La Sirena lacks developed tourist services, making possible a closer contact with nature, but on the other hand requiring visitors to travel to Aguas Dulces if they want to use food or accommodation services. It also does not have its own lifeguard.

=== Unofficial nudist destinations ===
In 2014 the then member of departmental parliament of Canelones Lyliam Espinosa worked on a project to create a nudist and LGBT friendly beach in Canelones Department, between El Fortín and Villa Argentina, near El Águila monument. This beach, located in a kind of corner, local people and European families came to practise nudism since at least 14 years counted from 2014, tolerated by locals.

Miramar Beach, the easternmost beach in Montevideo Department, is located south to Carrasco neighbourhood and is covered at the north by a dense vegetation that protects it from public viewing. Due to this feature it was visited by local nudists since several years, but in secrecy because the departmental rules ban the entrance in nudity without any kind of swimwear. (Note: This is due to a departmental ruling in Montevideo provides the "ban to bathers to enter (...) without wearing a statutory swimwear" (Departmental Digest, article D.2349), being the allowed swimwear "for women the one piece swimsuit or two-pieced bikini. For men is the standard swimsuit or short made of non-transparent fabric.". Also "isa forbidden the pool 'slip' or alike" according the judgement of the beach authorities (Departmental Digest, article D.2350). The transgression of this rule is punished with a fine.) In September 2018 several individuals proposed or supported in the Montevideo gonvernment's online petition platform Montevideo Decide to designate this beach as an official naturist beach. Nevertheless, this campaign, along with a proposed naked protest in Plaza Independencia, ended with failure.

=== Proposed ===
The intendant of Colonia Department Napoleón Gardiol in August 2020 proposed and after that authorized the designation of a new naturist beach in Colonia, located at around 7 kilometers of Colonia del Sacramento, near Laguna de los Patos town, in the shore of River Plate, as an intent to attract more tourists. Its official inauguration was scheduled to be done in the next summer, however, after the new intendant Carlos Moreira took the charge (for the second time) cancelled this designation along with the whole project of naturist beach, citing as a reason that there was no need to create a naturist beach.

== See also ==
- List of social nudity places in South America
- Naturism in Argentina
