= Topfreedom =

Social movement to allow female toplessness

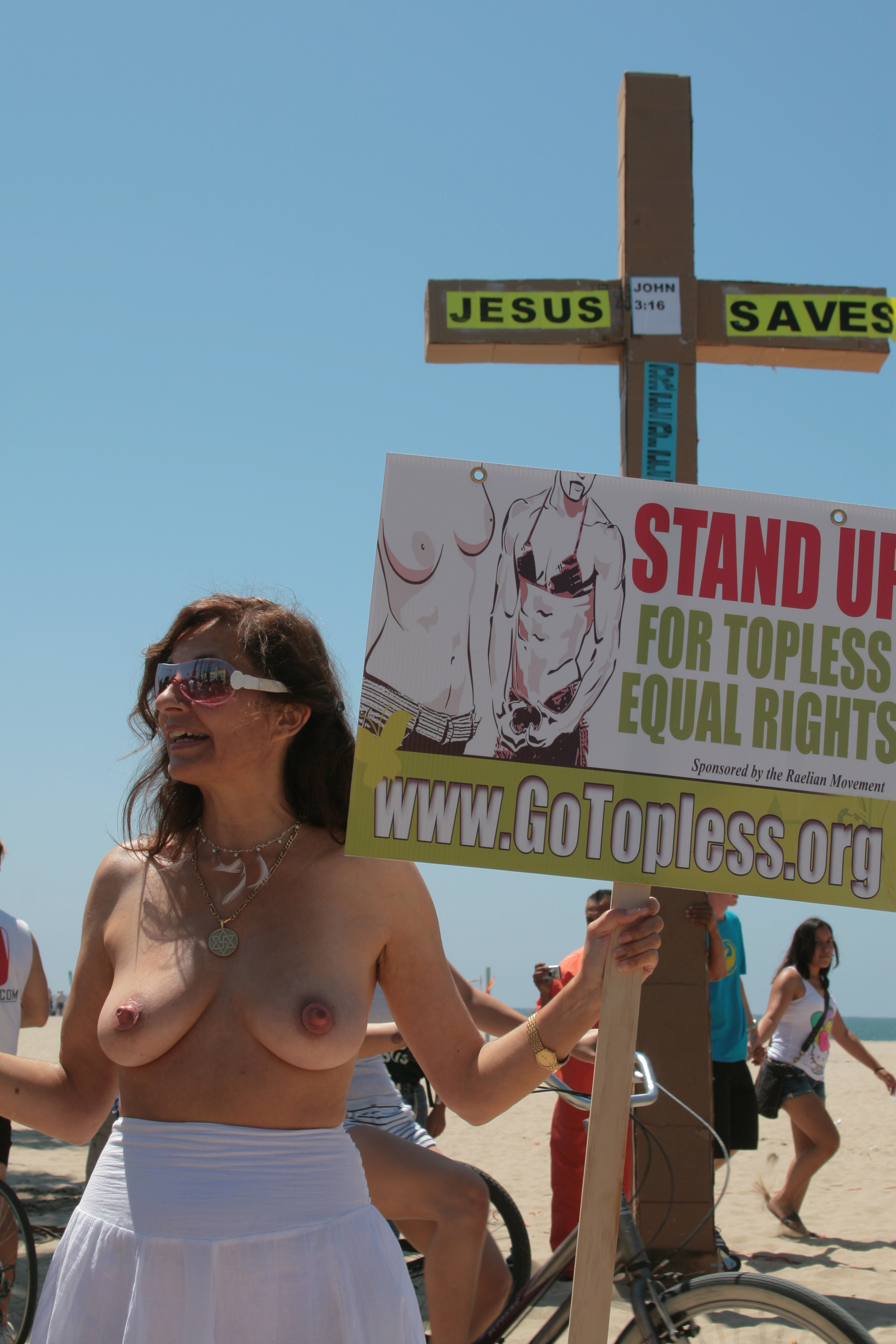
A woman protesting for the right to go topless anywhere a man could. Venice Beach, California, 2011

Topfreedom is a cultural and political movement seeking changes in laws to allow women to be topless in public places where men are permitted to be barechested, as a form of gender equality. Specifically, the movement seeks the repeal or overturning of laws which restrict a woman's right not to have her chest covered at all times in public.

In addition, topfreedom advocates seek allowing nursing mothers to openly breastfeed in public.

== Social and legal attitudes ==
Many societies consider women who expose their nipples and areolae as immodest and contrary to social norms. In many jurisdictions a topless woman may be cited for public lewdness, indecent exposure, public indecency or disorderly conduct. Independently from the legality of the practice, topless women may also face harassment. Topfreedom advocates seek to change community attitudes to breasts as sex objects or indecent.

Several countries in Europe have decriminalised non-sexual toplessness. Topless swimming and sunbathing on beaches has become acceptable in many parts of Europe, though the practice remains controversial in many places, and not common in most places. Many public swimming pools in Europe are owned by municipalities, which are treated as private organisations and allowed to set their dress codes.

=== Breastfeeding ===
In many countries around the world, breastfeeding in public is not unusual. During 2006–2010 and earlier, a number of news reports in the United States cited incidents where women were refused service or harassed for breastfeeding in public. In response, a majority of U.S. states have passed laws explicitly permitting nursing in public. The United States federal government enacted a law in 1999 which specifically provides that "a woman may breastfeed her child at any location in a Federal building or on Federal property, if the woman and her child are otherwise authorized to be present at the location." However, these laws generally do not apply to rules imposed by private organizations or on private property, such as restaurants, airlines, or shopping malls.

== Topfreedom by country ==
=== Asia ===
==== Taiwan ====
In support of Icelandic student Adda Smaradottir's FreeTheNipple act in public cyberspace, young women uploaded their topless photos to Facebook and protested against its Community Standards of considering women's breasts as sexual materials. Those photos and related news articles were blocked initially, but Facebook considered those photos did not violate Community Standards.

=== Europe ===
==== Denmark ====
Bathing and sunbathing in the nude (including topless) is legal on Danish beaches. Nudity and toplessness in other public outdoor places is generally also legal, unless it involves "offensive conduct" or is likely to cause public outrage. The public outrage law is rarely used in practice, but in 1972 audience members were convicted of being nude in the Royal Danish Theatre. In December 2007, a group of women and men calling themselves Topless Front swam topless in public swim baths to promote topless equality. In March 2008, after a campaign by the group, Copenhagen's Culture and Leisure Committee voted to allow topless bathing in its swimming pools. After the committee had voted, it was revealed that no laws had existed against topless bathing, effectively making the vote unnecessary. However, some public baths had (and have) restricted it themselves. Public breastfeeding is supported by the vast majority of both sexes in Denmark, is entirely legal and accepted in almost all places, except for a few private cafés and restaurants that have restricted it.

==== Finland ====
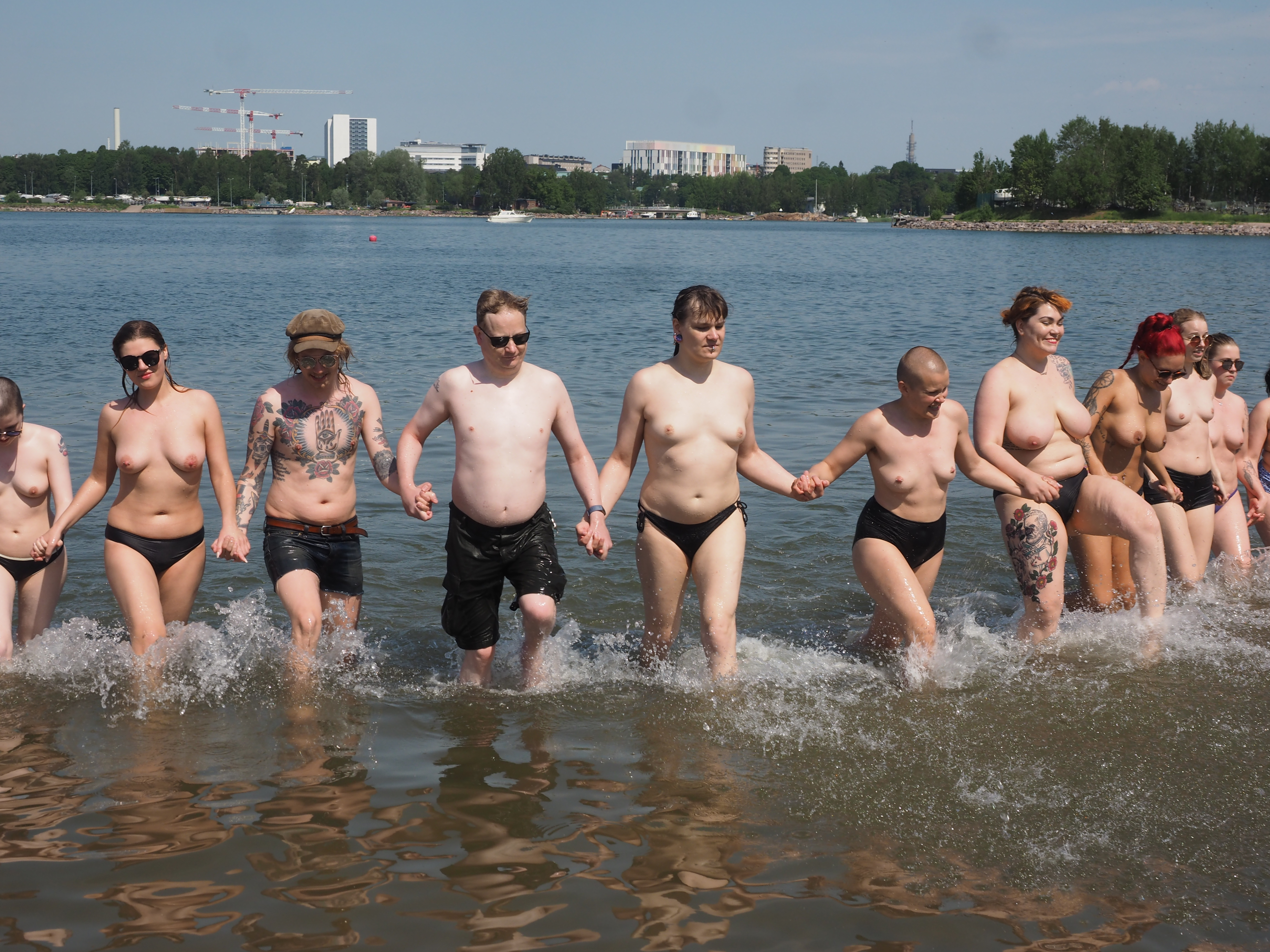
A group of topless women and bare-chested men at a beach in Helsinki, Finland, protesting after a woman had been forced away from a beach in Hyvinkää for topless sunbathing

In Finland, toplessness is not illegal, yet topless women have been removed from beaches. Sandra Marins and Säde Vallarén criticized this and organized Finland's first event demanding topless equality, called Tissiflashmob (breast flash mob). On Finland's Independence day, 6 December 2019, both Marins and Vallarén showed their breasts on live TV and it sparked a lot of conversation. Tissiflashmob 2020 was bigger than the previous one, now organized at the same time in eight different cities. The city of Helsinki has decided to allow topless sunbathing on its beaches in 2023, regardless of gender.

==== France ====
In France, the feminist collective Les TumulTueuses organized a topfree protest in Paris in May 2009. It is legal to sunbathe topless in France, although local regulations may ban the practice with directives about clothing.

A survey in 2019 found regional differences; on the Côte d'Azur and Provence, 36% of women said they go topless at the beach, but in Bourgogne-Franche-Comté only 8%.

In 2020, after a police incident, topless sunbathing was defended by the French interior minister.

==== Germany ====
Topless bike ride, Germany, Berlin, Mauerpark, 4th July 2026: "We are coming out, Free the nipple gender equality bike ride

The "Gesellschaft für Freiheitsrechte" sued in 2021 at the Kammergericht after a woman was not allowed to go topless at Plansche playground in Berlin. The court decided that toplessness is allowed because of the equality clause of the Grundgesetz

==== Greece ====
In Greece, toplessness is legal.

==== Iceland ====
In Iceland, toplessness is legal.

==== Italy ====
Female toplessness has been officially legalized (in a nonsexual context) in all public beaches and swimming pools throughout the country (unless otherwise specified by region, province or municipality by-laws) on 20 March 2000, when the Supreme Court of Cassation (through sentence No. 3557) determined that the exposure of the nude female breast, after several decades, is now considered a "commonly accepted behavior", and therefore, has "entered into the social costume".

==== Poland ====
In Poland in 2008–2009, two women from Szczecin including glamour model Dorota Krzysztofek, won a court battle that reasserted the women's right to sunbathe topless on public beaches. Krzysztofek, along with her female companion, were fined by local municipal officials for topless sunbathing at a public recreation area. The women refused to pay the fine and took the matter to Civil Court. Their first hearing had to be postponed due to remarkable media interest.

On November 7, 2008, judge Szczepańska upheld the city staff decision, and charged the women with indecent exposure, explaining that their personal freedoms cannot encroach on the freedoms of families with children who frequent the same recreation spot. Although topless sunbathing is not prohibited in Poland, the judge sentenced them to pay a fine of 230 zlotys (150 zlotys by different source, or €40, $55) for breaking the rules of conduct. In her rationale, the judge also said that it is not up to the defendants to teach youngsters human anatomy; however, her decision was appealed by Krzysztofek's female friend soon afterwards, with the plea of not guilty.

In 2009, the appellate court declared both women to be innocent, because the city staff were unable to prove that anyone at the beach was indignant or scandalized by their toplessness, and no complaint was ever reported. On the contrary, some visitors stood up to their defense. There were no signs at the recreation area against what is otherwise legal. The appellate court's decision was binding, but it also created an aura of ambivalence, with topless sunbathing in public declared acceptable only if nobody else including families with children formally objects to it.

==== Romania ====
In Romania, women are allowed to appear topless in public as long as it does not have sexual connotations.

==== Spain ====
There are no laws in Spain that officially prohibit public nudity (in a non-sexual context), and because of this, both topless sunbathing and naturism (the latter on a smaller scale) are frequently practiced without any issues in all beaches throughout the country, while the number of partakers may vary depending on the location and the day. It is very common in the Balearic Islands, Canaries, Costa Brava and Costa del Sol (a few municipalities, such as Barcelona, have created by-laws to forbid public nudity, including female toplessness on their streets, not on the beach). Due to the widespread practice of topless sunbathing, the municipalities of Galdakao and L'Ametlla del Vallès decided to legalize female toplessness on their public pools (in March 2016 and June 2018, respectively), and it is tolerated in many others, like in Madrid (without the need of a specific rule). It is less common on private or condominium pools, and a few have by-laws to ban it. Moreover, there are some surveys indicating that more than 40% of the Spanish women who were interviewed (aged 18 or older) reported to have been topless on a beach at least once.

==== Sweden ====
In Sweden, toplessness is not explicitly illegal. The law usually applied to cases of nudity is about disorderly conduct (Swedish: förargelseväckande beteende) – it does not say anything about how undressed one can be, so it is a matter of legal tradition, although there is a law against gender discrimination. However, private or public establishments are permitted to establish dress codes which may require women to wear tops, and deny access or remove individuals who breach these standards. In September 2007, the "Bara Bröst" group (a pun meaning both "Only Breasts" and "Bare Breasts") appeared to promote topless equality in these semi-public facilities. The group staged several events in public swim baths in September and October 2007, starting in Uppsala from which they were evicted several times, before succeeding in Sundsvall.

The group scored a victory in June 2009 when the Malmö city's sports and recreation committee approved new rules that, while requiring everybody to wear bathing suits at indoor public swimming pools, did not require women to cover their breasts. "We don't define what bathing suits men should wear so it doesn't make much sense to do it for women. And besides, it's not unusual for men to have large breasts that resemble women's breasts", said a council spokesman.

==== United Kingdom ====
According to the Crown Prosecution Service, "In the absence of any sexual context and in relation to nudity where the person has no intention to cause alarm or distress it will normally be appropriate to take no action unless members of the public were actually caused harassment, alarm or distress (as opposed to considering the likelihood of this)." Breastfeeding is a specifically protected activity.

=== North America ===
==== Canada ====
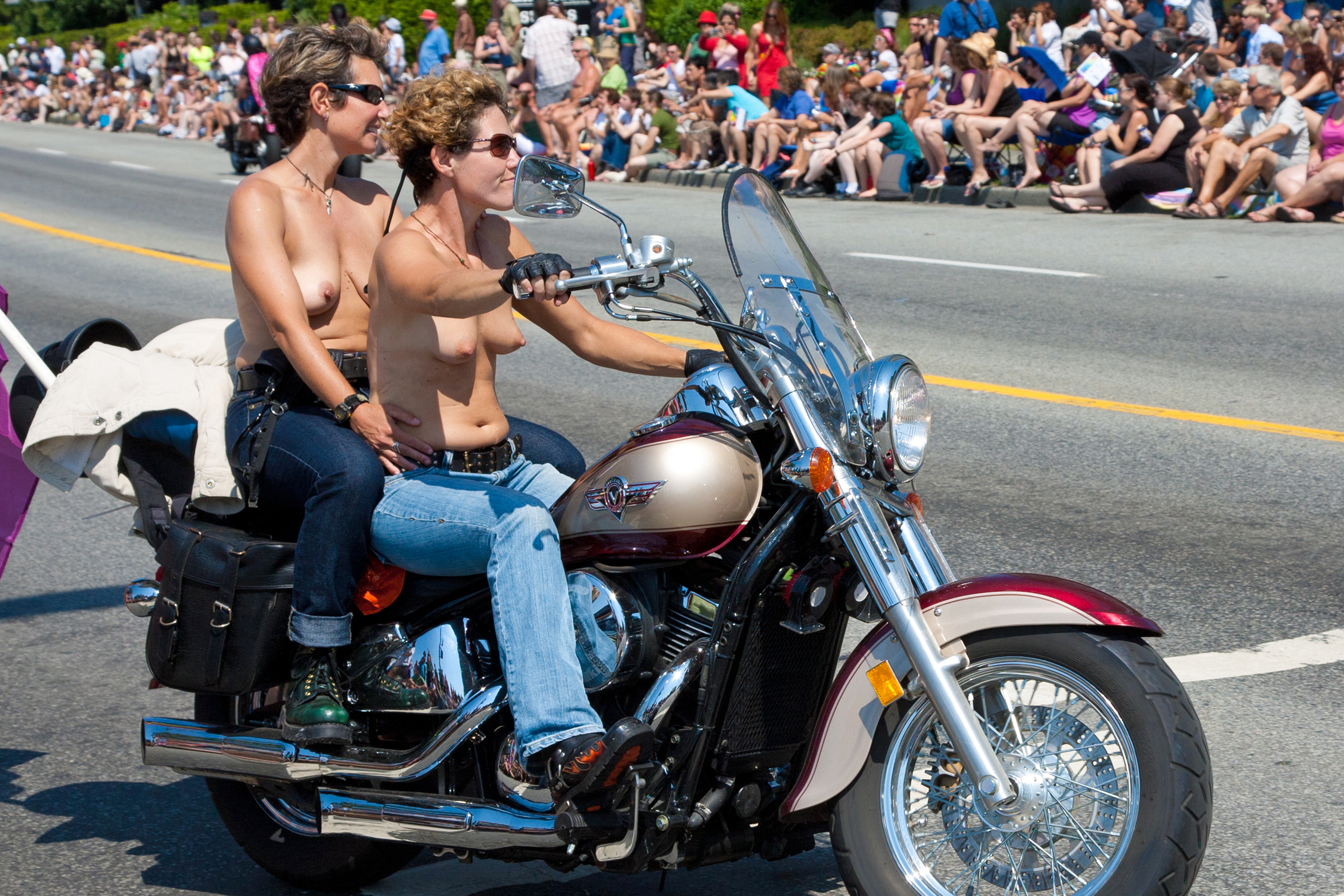
Topless women at Vancouver Pride Festival

In 1991, toplessness as an indecent act was challenged by Gwen Jacob in Guelph, Ontario, who removed her shirt and was charged with indecency. Part of her defense was the double standards between men and women. Although she was convicted, this was overturned by the Court of Appeal. This case determined that being topless is not indecent under the meaning of the Criminal Code. However it did not establish any constitutional right of equality. This case subsequently led to the acquittal of women in British Columbia and Saskatchewan who faced similar charges. Although each province and territory technically reserves its right to interpret the law as it pleases, the Ontario case has proven influential. Since the matter has not been determined by the Supreme Court of Canada, it is still possible that a woman could be convicted elsewhere in Canada, but interpretation of moral law in Canada has become increasingly liberalized. There do not appear to have been any further women charged in Canada since these cases were determined.

In February 2023, the cities of Edmonton and Calgary, both in the province of Alberta, changed their policies such that wearing bathing suit tops in city-operated pools was an individual's choice.

==== Mexico ====
The only public place in Mexico that officially allows female toplessness is Playa Zipolite (a nude beach located in the state of Oaxaca), where the practice of naturism was legalized in 2016. However, the practice of topless sunbathing (as well as naturism in some cases) is commonly tolerated on a few beaches in the state of Quintana Roo, more precisely in the Riviera Maya region (especially between the cities of Playa del Carmen and Tulum); furthermore, there are a few clothing-optional resorts made for adults only (also located in the Riviera Maya) where all men and women aged 18 (or older) can frequent the facilities without the need to wear clothes (if so they wish).

==== United States ====
Female toplessness laws in the United States by state and territory Legal Illegal Vague/unknown Questionable legality

In the United States, states have primary jurisdiction in matters of public morality. The topfreedom movement has claimed success in a few instances in persuading some state and federal courts to overturn some state laws on the basis of sex discrimination or equal protection, arguing that a woman should be free to expose her chest in any context in which a man can expose his. Other successful cases have been on the basis of freedom of expression in protest, or simply that exposure of breasts is not indecent (or similar terminology).

Laws and ordinances barring female toplessness are being challenged in federal courts around the nation. Each lawsuit, if it prevails at the appellate level, will legalize topfreedom in the following U.S. circuit courts of appeals (from west to east): 9 (California), 8 (Missouri) and 1 (Maryland). A federal lawsuit in the 7th Circuit (Illinois), was lost at the appellate level and the petition for review by the U.S. Supreme Court was denied.

A preliminary injunction in a federal lawsuit in the 10th Circuit (Colorado), was won at the appellate level. In September 2019, after spending over $300,000, Fort Collins decided to stop defending their ordinance and repeal it. That effectively gave females of all ages the right to go topless wherever males can in the jurisdiction of the 10th Circuit (Wyoming, Utah, Colorado, New Mexico, Kansas and Oklahoma states as well as all counties and cities therein).

=== Oceania ===
==== Australia ====
In Australia, indecent exposure laws only refer to the genital area, so technically both male and female toplessness is legal. However, many local councils impose their own rules, and have the power to ask topless people to leave an area. Additionally, women who go topless are sometimes issued charges such as being a public nuisance, or offensive behaviour.

On public beaches, local bylaws are not heavily enforced, and women can often sunbathe topless without legal repercussions.

Breastfeeding in public places is a legal right in Australia. Under the Sex Discrimination Act 1984, no business or service provider can discriminate against a breastfeeding woman. Women can still breastfeed even if no other food/drink is allowed in the area. If a special baby care room is available for breastfeeding, women are not required to use it unless they wish to. If someone abuses a breastfeeding woman or forces her to leave, this may come under state/territory harassment laws. These protections also include women who are expressing breast milk for their baby.

==== New Zealand ====
In New Zealand, there is no specific law prohibiting nudity in public places. If a person is nude and also exhibiting lewd and lascivious, or obscene behaviour, then they may fall afoul of laws.

The High Court of New Zealand has upheld a conviction of disorderly conduct for nudity in the street, because it was not a place where nudity was known to occur or commonplace. Being nude in the street is likely to incur a small fine if a complaint is made against the person, or if the person ignores a police order to cover themselves. However, in practice, the likelihood of being prosecuted for nudity on a public beach is low, providing the person keeps to themselves.

In 2012, a woman swam topless on Ōpunake beach. The police were called, but informed the callers that toplessness was not an offence.

In 2017, nudists used the beach at Tauranga, which caused consternation among some residents. However, the local council said there were no bylaws dealing with the issue, and that nudity was not an offence.

=== South America ===
==== Argentina ====
Female toplessness is allowed in the official nude beaches of Puerto Escondido, located near Miramar, and Playa Querandí, located in Villa Gesell, as well as in some private naturist resorts.

On 7 February 2017, hundreds of topless women protested in Buenos Aires, Córdoba, Mar del Plata and Rosario, among other cities throughout the country. The protest was called in Spanish tetazo (a portmanteau of the Spanish word tetas, meaning "tits", and the Spanish suffix "-azo", which denotes a hitting action). The protestors objected against the "objectification" of the female body, and also disapproved the decision made by 20 police officers, who days before, had expelled from a beach located in Necochea 3 women who were topless sunbathing there.

==== Brazil ====
The Article 233 of the Chapter VI of the Title VI of the Penal Code asserts that indecent exposure (known in Portuguese as ato obsceno, meaning "obscene act") is a wrongdoing act punished with imprisonment or fine, but does not specify what are the nude parts of the human body which could be fitted on this misdemeanor. Despite this vagueness, female toplessness tends to be considered an "obscene act" by the Brazilian authorities, and the practice has been frequently repressed, including some arrests made by the police throughout the years.

Generally, the practice of topless sunbathing by women has been accepted only in official nude beaches and in some private naturist clubs. However, for many years, there has been one notable exception: the Carnival in Rio de Janeiro. During the famous two-night parades yearly held by 12 samba schools (6 on each day) at the Sambadrome Marquês de Sapucaí, the official policy is that only the genital area cannot be publicly shown (in this case all nude men and women must wear a merkin, which is known in Portuguese as tapa-sexo, roughly translated as "sex cover"). Thus, both men and women can openly expose their bare breasts and buttocks to the public during the marches without any problem.

Since the early 2010s, there are reports of some small and sporadic protests, especially in some beaches located in Rio de Janeiro. These protests are called in Portuguese toplessaços (a portmanteau of the English word "toplessness" and the Portuguese suffix "-aço", translated from the Spanish "-azo", which denotes a hitting action). In each protest, a group of women, soon after being reunited, decide to quickly take off all clothes they were wearing above the waist (including bras, bikinis or any other tops), culminating in a state of public "breast-flashing" for a few minutes before putting on their clothes again. This way, these are considered a kind of topless flash mob protests. The purpose of these protests is to claim for the official legalization of female toplessness in Brazil under the principle of gender equality.

==== Chile ====
Exposing the breasts in public is not a crime, although it is an offense applicable according to the Article 373 of the Penal Code to those who "in any way offend modesty or good customs". Similarly, the Article 495 says: "Shall be punished with a fine of one monthly tax unit (first paragraph) whoever contravenes the rules that the authority dictates to preserve public order or prevent it from being altered, unless the act constitutes a crime or simple offense".

Faced with so much inconvenience, a group of women together with the photographer and pioneer of naturism in Chile, René Rojas, managed to create the first nude beach in the country in 2000, called Playa Luna, as well as the unofficial restricted areas that were created in Playa Luna Norte (Tarapacá), Playa Luna Sur (Coliumo), Playa Escondida (Antofagasta), Playa Blanca (Tongoy) and Pichilemu, where it is possible to completely undress with total normality.

==== Uruguay ====
The practice of female toplessness is allowed in the official nude beaches of Chihuahua, located in the resort of the same name, and La Sirena, located in the resort of Aguas Dulces.

== See also ==
- Bikini barista § Controversies and litigation
- Bralessness
- Clothing laws by country
- Clothes free organizations
- Female toplessness in the United States
- Femen
- Free the nipple
- Gender equality
- Go Topless Day
- Naturism
- Nude recreation
- Nudity and protest
- Public nudity
- Sex-positive feminism
- Timeline of feminism in the United States
- True Scotsman
- Women's Equality Day
