= List of social nudity places in Asia =

The places where social nudity is practised for recreation in Asia include nude beaches (also known as clothing-optional beaches or free beaches) and some naturist resorts.

== Indonesia ==
- Bali au Naturel (Buleleng, Bali)
- Bali Natur (Buleleng, Bali)
- Laki Uma Villa (Badung, Bali)

== Israel ==
=== Central District ===
- Ga'ash (גַּעַשׁ) Beach (32°14′52″N 34°49′30″E, 22 km north of Tel Aviv by road) located just west of Kibbutz Yakum (יָקוּם) has a clothing-optional section. The northernmost part, just south of Netanya, is popular with gay men.
- Shefayim (שְׁפָיִים) Nude Beach (32°12′58″N 34°48′52″E, 19 km north of Tel Aviv by road) is a small nudist beach visited by those who prefer its tranquility.

=== Israel-Occupied West Bank ===
- Metsoke Dragot (מצוקי דרגות) Beach by the Dead Sea, located 31°35′22″N 35°24′36″E, an oasis where a couple of sweet water springs pour into the Dead Sea. This is a natural beach and there are no facilities, but the sweet water springs can be used for shower after a dip in the Dead Sea.
- Neve Midbar Beach at the northern end of the Dead Sea is a small private resort with a section of the shore set aside as a nude beach.

=== Southern District ===
- The end of Lighthouse Beach (29°29′47″N 34°54′34″E, 10 km southwest of Eilat by road) close to Princess Hotel is frequently visited by nude bathers. It is a great location for snorkelling above the tropical coral reefs.
- Twice a year, in June and September, a mostly-young naturist festival is held at Desert Ashram near Eilat.

=== Tel Aviv District ===
- Apollonia Beach (32°11′36″N 34°48′20″E, 15 km north of Tel Aviv by road) is located immediately west of Apollonia National Park. The narrow strip of secluded beach under the fortress ruins is frequented by nudists.
- Tel Aviv Naked Swim is a semi-secretive annual event normally published on a private unsearchable Facebook group.

=== Haifa District ===
- Atlit Beach, on the Mediterranean coast 19 km south of downtown Haifa by road or rail, has a popular clothing-optional stretch frequented by gay men from the greater Haifa area.

== Japan ==
- Some public hot spring baths in Japan allow mixed gender nudity, particularly those in rural locations and where permitted by prefectural law. Related Japanese terms include: onsen for hot spring; konyoku for mixed gender bath; and sentō for a type of public bath, but gender separated.

・Far East Naturism Tours Japan

== Philippines ==
- China Sea Island in Boayan Island, Philippines
- Fridays Island in El Nido, Palawan, Philippines

== Thailand ==
In Thailand there are a number of naturist resorts that are member resorts of the Naturist Association Thailand. While some secluded areas may informally be recognized as "unofficial" nude beaches, public nudity is generally not culturally accepted, and Thai laws prohibit it.

- Barefeet in Bangkok
- Chan Resort in Pattaya
- Dragonfly Naturist Village outside of Pattaya is the largest naturist resort in Thailand and is a participating business of the American Association for Nude Recreation.
- Oriental Beach Village on the island of Koh Kho Khao
- Peace Blue Naiharn in Phuket has been completed and is open, and additional naturist resorts are under construction.
- Secret Beach in Koh Pha-ngan
- Zen Beach in Koh Pha-ngan

Some previously textile resorts are also becoming naturist resorts.

- Harmony Resort Rawai and Oasis Naturist Villa in Phuket and Barefeet Heaven Hill Naturist Resort in Trang were both textile resorts until recently.
