= La Sirena Beach =

Nude beach near Aguas Dulces resort, Uruguay

La Sirena Beach Playa La Sirena
- Beach
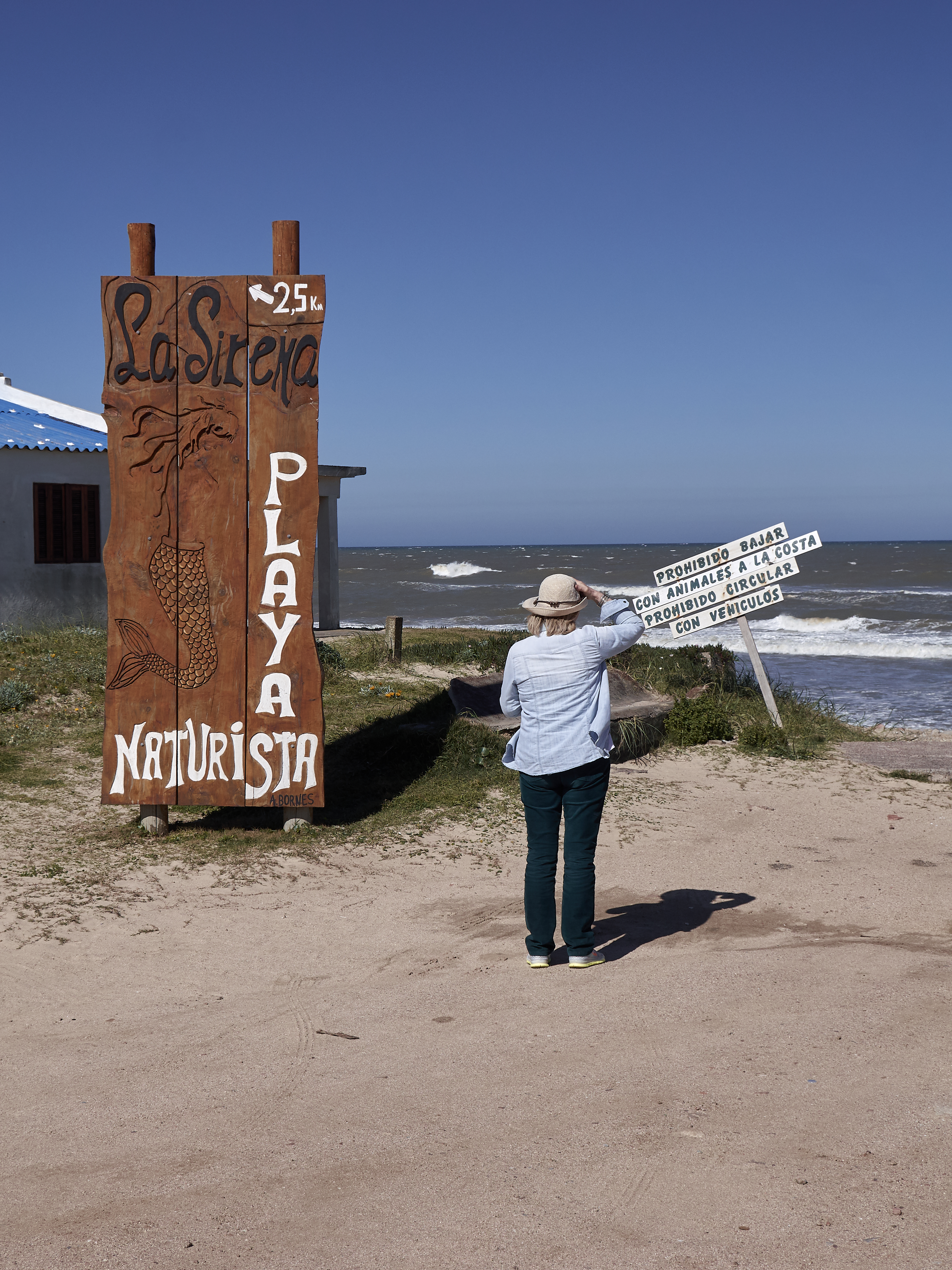
- La Sirena Beach, 2017

- Coordinates: 34.229°S 53.746°W
- Location: Aguas Dulces, Castillos Municipality, Rocha, Uruguay

La Sirena Beach (Spanish: Playa La Sirena) is a beach located around two kilometers north of Aguas Dulces resort, in Rocha Department, Uruguay. It was officially designated as a naturist beach by the authorities of the government of Rocha.

== Description ==
It is located at two and a half kilometers north from the beach of Aguas Dulces resort town. It can be reached going from Aguas Dulces, walking from the end of Cachimba y Faroles street through the beach or the sand dunes until reaching the sign posts.

It is a wide beach of thin sands in along the Atlantic Ocean shore, surrounded by sand dunes covered by psammophile vegetation, with minor wetlands, ponds and acacia trees.

== Features ==
La Sirena is a naturist beach, specially authorized by the department authorities for practising naturism and nudism, although it is a clothing-optional beach, not being mandatory to enter completely naked. It is the second naturist beach of Uruguay after Chihuahua beach in Maldonado Department, and it opened as such in 2012.

As in every beach, there are rules about hygiene and protection of the environment, but there are also specific rules related to this kind of beach: to respect the personal space of the other naturist people, to not stare at other persons persistently or in a lustful way, nor to take photos or record videos of anyone without their consent.

The beach does not have its own lifeguard support and its tourist infrastructure is underdeveloped, therefore, in order to seek for housing or food is necessary to travel to Aguas Dulces resort. For tourism-related inquiries, these can be done at the tourist information office of the government of Rocha, in the crossing of Route 16 and Cachimba y Flores street in Aguas Dulces resort.

== See also ==
- Naturism in Uruguay
- Nudity
- Social nudity places in South America § Uruguay
