= Naturism in Argentina =

Nudist movement

Naturism in Argentina (or nudism in Argentina) is the movement supporting the practice of social nudism in the country. It began to be regularly performed in 1934, and it is still in practice today, while still being a taboo topic in the Argentine society. The most important nudist destinations include Escondida Beach, Querandí Beach, and Eden club, all of them located in Buenos Aires Province, as well as Yatan Rumi in the Córdoba sierras.

== History ==
A precursor for nudism in Argentina was recorded in the 1810s, when bathers would go to beaches in Buenos Aires and bathe naked. This custom met opposition and was confronted by the authorities of that time with legal limits and fines. There was even an attempt to establish gender-segregated areas in the beaches, but it had little success.

The naturist movement per se originated during the 1930s. Individuals such as Francisco Verding, Agustín Puyo, and Roberto Ferrer practiced nudism privately at the time, but due to the need to create a community for social nudism, in 1934 they established the First Naturist Nudist Association of Argentina (Primera Asociación Naturo Desnudista Argentina, or PANDA) in the area of Castelar, in Buenos Aires. Conservatives were quick to reject public nudity, which even resulted in police intervention. Due to this, PANDA members —sometimes named "adamites" referencing the adamite doctrine— purchased land on the shores of Reconquista river, 4 kilometers away from the old Márquez Bridge in Ituzaingó. The association gathered 90 members, 50 men and 40 women. They met on Sundays to perform activities such as physical exercises, rhythmic dances, games, nature watching or to socialize and bathe in the river. Around that time, curious people began to wander around the nudist colony to peek at the nudists. The association began to wane in the 1970s, and finally dissolved in the 80s. In 1987, a nudist group called NAT by Cristian Vogt and Jotge Biagosh emerged in a country house named "Los Galpones", near the city of Benavídez, in the Buenos Aires Province. This group operated until March 1999.

On January 10, 1994, actress Moria Casán and her then partner Luis Vadalá inaugurated Franka Beach (Playa Franka), an area in the Argentine coast of Mar Chiquita Partido, in the Buenos Aires Province, where women could be topless. A known practice in this beach was that of "bra cutting" at the start of every summer season to symbolize putting an end to prejudices against self-acceptance and to advocate for liberty, inclusion and gender equality. Later, a parador (a beach facility that offers food services and recreational activities) operating 24/7 was built. However, the Franka Beach experience began to unfold into a crisis due to pressure from neighbors who wanted the beach to close for morality reasons, but mostly due to debts that had accumulated from shareholders Antonio Fraiese and Luis Vadalá, who had failed to pay the beach license fee for eight years. As a result of this, the Mar Chiquita mayor revoked their license on September 3, 2004.

Nowadays, Argentine nudists congregate in the Association for the Argentine Naturist Nudism (Asociación para el Nudismo Naturista Argentino, or APANNA), a non-profit civil association that aims to promote the practice of nudism. The association was granted legal status in September 2005.

In Argentina, different socialization activities by gay, nudist men have emerged since the 2000s. In 2005 Argentina's first nudist bar, called Fever Night, had theme nights focused on gay nudists. In 2009, a gay, nudist country villa called "La Fiesta del Chavoncito" and located in the city of Pilar, in the Buenos Aires Province, was reported.

== Nudist locations ==
Escondida Beach (Playa Escondida), is located at the foot of cliffs that are over 20 feet tall in Chapadmalal, General Pueyrredón Partido, Buenos Aires Province. It is the first clothing-optional Argentine beach, and it was established in 2001. Attendees include elderly people, families, and couples, with the latter comprimising one half of the total of attendants.

People such as elderly, families, and couples attend the beach; the latter comprising half of the visitors attending there.

Querandí Beach (Playa Querandí) is another clothing-optional beach. It is located in Villa Gesell Partido and was designated as naturist beach by the local government in 2008. It is a natural beach that has no buildings and offers no services due to being located in a protected area.

The naturist club Edén, established in 1999, is located in a three-hectare country house in La Reja town, Buenos Aires Province. This club's activities include volleyball, trekking, singing, and meal sharing.

On the Sierra Grande, 14 kilometers from Tanti city of the Punilla Department, Córdoba Province, there is a naturist reserve known as Yatan Rumi, established in 2003. The people who frequent this reserve include families, couples without children, and single men and women. A nudist marathon, naked tango dancing lessons, parties, and nature-linked activities are held here.

== See also ==
- Social nudity places in South America
- Naturism in Uruguay
