= Free the Nipple (film) =

Free The Nipple
- Film poster
- Directed by: Lina Esco
- Written by: Hunter Richards
- Produced by: Lisa Azuelos; Lina Esco; Gigi Graff; Leah Kilpatrick; Julien Madon; Hunter Richards
- Starring: Lina Esco; Casey LaBow; Monique Coleman; Griffin Newman; Zach Grenier; Janeane Garofalo; Lola Kirke
- Cinematography: Berenice Eveno
- Edited by: Matt Landon
- Music by: Nick Littlemore; Peter Mayes; Henry Hey
- Production companies: Bethsabée Mucho; Disruptive Films; Emotion Pictures
- Distributed by: IFC Films; WTFilms
- Release date: December 12, 2014
- Running time: 79 minutes
- Country: United States
- Language: English

Free the Nipple is a 2014 American comedy-drama independent film directed by Lina Esco and written by Hunter Richards. Esco created the film to draw public attention to the issue of gender equality and encourage discussion over what she perceived as America's glorification of violence and repression of sexuality. When in post-production during February 2014, the film was picked up for distribution by Paris-based WTFilms.

== Synopsis ==
Led by Liv, an army of passionate women launch a revolution to "Free the Nipple" and decriminalize female toplessness. Based on true events, a mass movement of topless women, backed by First Amendment lawyers, graffiti installations, and national publicity stunts, invade New York City to protest censorship hypocrisies and promote gender equality legally and culturally in the U.S.

== Cast ==
- Casey LaBow as Cali
- Monique Coleman as Roz
- Zach Grenier as Jim Black
- Lina Esco as With
- Lola Kirke as Liv
- Michael Panes as Lawyer
- John Keating as Kilo
- Griffin Newman as Orson
- Leah Kilpatrick as Elle
- Jen Ponton as Charlie
- Liz Chuday as Blogger Liz
- Sarabeth Stroller as Pippy
- Janeane Garofalo as Anouk

== Advocacy ==
Miley Cyrus, who had worked with Esco on LOL, came forward to support the film and a woman's right to bare a nipple in public. Joining Cyrus in her support of Esco and the film are Rumer Willis, Nico Tortorella, Lydia Hearst, Giles Matthey, Cara Delevingne, and Russell Simmons.

== Release ==
The film was picked up by IFC Films, and it was announced on September 29, 2014, that Sundance Selects picked the film for North American release.
