= Lina Esco =

American actress, producer, director and activist (born 1985)

- Born: May 14, 1985 (age 41)
- Occupations: Actress, activist, producer, director, model
- Years active: 2003–present

Lina Esco (born May 14, 1985) is an American actress, producer, director and activist. She gained recognition in 2007 for portraying Jimmy Smits' character's daughter in the CBS television drama Cane. Esco has also performed in films, including London (2005), Kingshighway (2010), LOL (2012), and Free the Nipple (2014). She is also known for portraying SWAT officer Christina "Chris" Alonso in S.W.A.T. and most recently, Captain Jackie Velez in the Netflix hit, The Rip (2026).

== Career ==
Esco was cast in her first television guest star role in 2006, as Angie Watson in the series CSI: NY. In March 2007 Esco joined the cast of the CBS drama Cane. In 2009, she guest starred in an episode of the Drop Dead Diva series with Paula Abdul. Esco played a lingerie model who had been fired for going public about her breast cancer survival story.

In February 2011, Esco was slated to join the cast of Fox's pilot Exit Strategy. Described as a high octane procedural set in the world of CIA agents who are sent in to "fix" operations gone bad. The cast included Ethan Hawke, Megan Dodds and with Antoine Fuqua directing. Esco was to play Mia, an MIT graduate and computer expert from South Boston. In 2014, Esco was cast in Ryan Murphy's pilot titled Open for HBO alongside Michelle Monaghan, Wes Bentley, Scott Speedman, and Jennifer Jason Leigh.

Esco's film debut was in 2005 with London. She played a supporting character in the 2012 comedy LOL.

Esco acted on S.W.A.T. From 2017-2022 She played Officer Christina "Chris" Alonso. Following the show's season five finale, Esco confirmed she was leaving the series to pursue other projects.

In the summer of 2024, Lina signed on to star in the George R.R. Martin anthology The Summer Machine. In 2026, she played Captain Jackie Velez in director Joe Carnahan’s The Rip starring Matt Damon and Ben Affleck. The film broke records on Netflix by hitting 41.6 million views in the first three days. The Rip held the #1 spot worldwide on Netflix for two weeks in a row.

=== Producing and directing ===
In April 2010, Esco produced "My Friend is...", a public service announcement for the Academy Award-winning documentary The Cove alongside Oscar-winning producer Fisher Stevens joining forces with a number of celebrities to bring awareness on the annual killing of dolphins in Taiji, Japan. She directed "Kids Speak Out Against Dolphin Captivity", a 2012 public service announcement for The Cove.

She directed and starred in Free the Nipple, which was released in select theaters, video on demand and on iTunes on December 12, 2014. She directed Free the Nipple in a bid to circumvent female nipple censorship.

=== Other work ===
Esco has been showcased in various commercial, music videos, magazines and publications. In 2001, she was featured in the Sinéad O'Connor music video "Jealous". She appears briefly in Moby's music video for "Southside" featuring Gwen Stefani. She was also an extra for a series of Axe commercials one including with Nick Lachey for the "Clix" campaign in 2007. Esco also features in Halos's music video for "Amalgam" in 2010.

On January 12, 2011, it was reported that Esco would be showcased on the Louis Vuitton's jewelry collection for the Spring/Summer 2011. The campaign featured sixteen "It" girls from around the globe that included Alexandra Richards, Annabelle Dexter Jones, Mary Charteris, Alka Balbir, Mohini Geisweiller, DJette Clara 3000, Charlotte Lebon, Hailey Gates, Nathalie Love and Rinko Kikuchi.

On May 16, 2011, Esco was featured in Ketel One ad campaign "Gentlemen, This is Vodka." directed by Academy Award nominee David O. Russell.

Esco is in a 2013 NFL Women's Apparel Collection TV advertisement.

In 2017, Esco was featured on the Audience network's Midnight Snack on Fullscreen (What's Underneath), where the guests remove their clothing on camera while talking about their life.

==== Activism and philanthropy ====
Esco has supported many foundations and organizations throughout her career.

Esco has been very involved in two organizations. Dolphin Project, which has gained much support from many celebrities, is an organization led by Richard O'Barry and aims to prevent dolphin slaughter and exploitation. On September 9, 2009, Esco held a private screening of The Cove in New York, alongside Russell Simmons and Fisher Stevens hosting the event to bring awareness to the film.

Esco may be best known for her involvement in women's rights and the Free the Nipple campaign. The organization, as Esco states, is to promote sexual equality. Free the Nipple has attracted attention from numerous celebrities including Courtney Love and Miley Cyrus, who also has a song on the soundtrack of the Free the Nipple movie and continues to strongly support the organization.

In December 2018, Esco began campaigning for overturning Cyntoia Brown's murder conviction.

Esco has been outspoken in advocating against sexual harassment (including recounting her own by Harvey Weinstein) and publicly calls on US states to pass the Equal Rights Amendment, which supporters claim would enshrine gender equality in the US's Constitution.

Lina has been active in animal activism for years, an ambassador for Animal Recovery Mission (ARM) and The Captain Paul Watson Foundation.

== Personal life ==
Esco is of Colombian descent. She has also spoken of being molested twice, while discussing the Me Too movement.

== Filmography ==
=== Actor ===
Film
Year	Title	Role	Notes
2005	London	Kelly	
2008	The Evening Journey	Marla	Short
2010	Kingshighway	Lena Capriolini	
2010	Where the Road Meets the Sun	Natasha	
2012	LOL	Janice	
2011	Low Fidelity	Melena	
2014	Free the Nipple	With	formerly Girlrillaz, also director and writer
2016	Fairy Dust	Lorna	
2021	Doors	Becky	Knockers segment
2026	The Rip	Captain Jackie Velez	

Television
Year	Title	Role	Notes
2006	CSI: NY	Angie Watson	"Live or Let Die" (Season 2, Episode 18)
2007	Cane	Katie Vega	13 episodes
2008	Heroes: Destiny	Elisa	4 episodes
2009	Drop Dead Diva	Lina Martinez	"Grayson Anatomy" (Season 1, Episode 13)
2009	CSI: Crime Scene Investigation	Angela Paulson	"Death and Maiden" (Season 10, Episode 6)
2011	Exit Strategy	Mia	Pilot
2016	Flaked	Kara	7 episodes
2016	Kingdom	Ava Flores	8 episodes
2017–2022	S.W.A.T.	Christina "Chris" Alonso - "D-28"	Main role

=== Producer ===
Year	Title	Notes
2014	Free the Nipple	formerly Girlrillaz, also actor and director
