= Bara Bröst =

Cultural movement of Swedish feminists

Bara Bröst network (Swedish: [ˈbɑ̂ːra ˈbrœsːt, ˈbɑ̌ːra -], literally "Just Breasts", "Only Breasts" or "Bare Breasts") is a cultural movement of Swedish feminists campaigning for the right of women to swim topless and to bare their breasts at beaches and in public pools.

The incident that led to the creation of the Bara Bröst took place in September 2007 at a swimming pool in Uppsala. A lifeguard on duty ordered two topless women to come out of the water and cover up their breasts. When they refused, they were forced to leave the premises. The incident drew national public attention. Outraged by what they saw as gender discrimination, Bara Bröst organized a show of solidarity with their own topless swimming actions at public pools in Malmö and in Lund. "We want our breasts to be as 'normal' and desexualized as men's, so that we too can pull off our shirts at football matches," spokeswomen Astrid Hellroth and Liv Ambjörnsson told the Ottar magazine published by the Swedish Association for Sexuality Education (RFSU).

== The legal wrangle ==
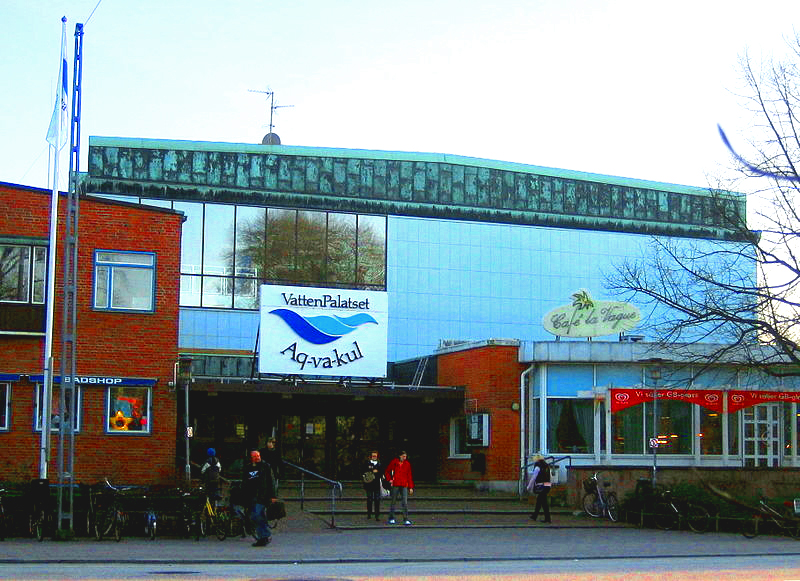
Aq-va-kul Leisure Centre in Malmö

Topless women at pools who were asked to vacate the premises demanded a full refund. Meanwhile, Inger Grotteblad of the leisure complex in Uppsala told the local newspaper that women are not permitted to bathe topless there. "Swimming pools generally require men to wear swimming trunks and women to wear either bikinis or one-piece swimsuits" she said. However, due to continuous pressure by the feminists from the Bara Bröst network, in 2009 the Malmö Sports and Recreation Committee in their final decision voted against a motion requiring women to wear "a top piece" with a two-piece swimsuit. The city officials considered a vote to be necessary; its results were unanimous. As a result, there is no requirement for women to cover their breasts at the city’s indoor pools at Lindängen, Oxievångsbadet and Aq-va-kul (pictured) if no one complains (including families with children). Bengt Forsberg, chair of the Sports and Recreation Committee said in an interview: "We don't define what bathing suits men should wear so it doesn't make much sense to do it for women. Also, it's not unusual for men to have large breasts that resemble women's breasts."

Notably, the new ruling by the city administration at Malmö did not result in any significant difference in the way female swimmers and sunbathers behaved that year at local pools, either indoors or outdoors. Zakrea El-Falou of the swimming pool in the centre of the city said: "My colleagues and I have not seen any women who have made use of the possibility to swim topless – not while we have been on duty anyway." Robert Nilsson, a city staffer at an open-air pool, noticed the same thing: "I haven't seen a single woman bathing topless during any of my shifts", he said.

== See also ==
- Topfreedom
