= Casey LaBow =

American film producer and actress

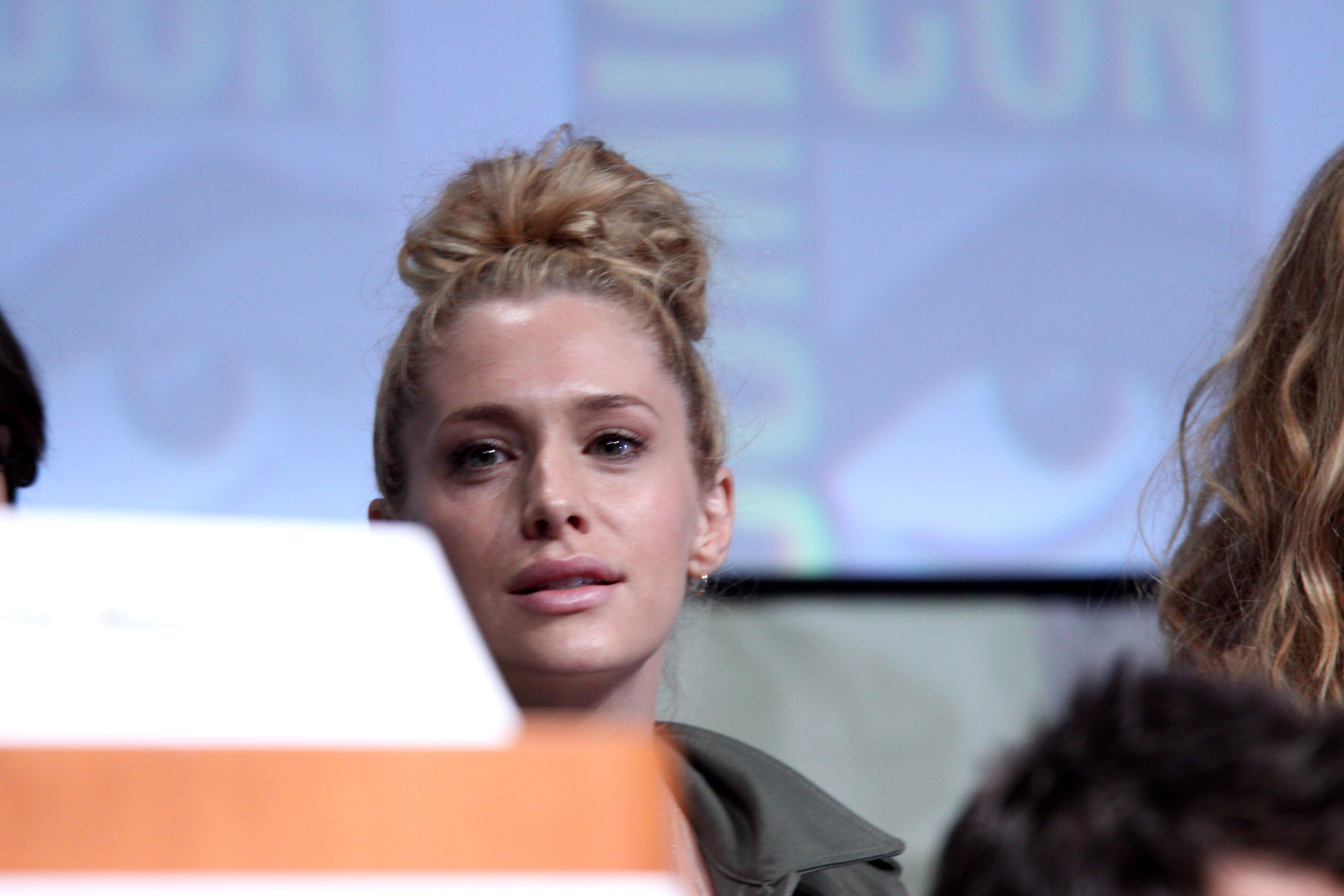
- Casey Labow speaking at San Diego Comic-Con, July 2012
- Born: Samantha Casey Labow; 14 August 1986 (age 40); New York City, New York, United States
- Education: American Academy of Dramatic Arts
- Occupations: Film actress; Television actress; Film producer
- Years active: 2005–present
- Known for: The Twilight Saga: Breaking Dawn – Part 1 & Part 2

Casey LaBow (b. Samantha Casey Labow, Aug. 14, 1986, New York City) is an American film producer and actress known for her role as Kate Denali in The Twilight Saga: Breaking Dawn – Part 1 and The Twilight Saga: Breaking Dawn – Part 2.

== Early life ==
LaBow moved from New York City to Los Angeles at the age of 16 with her mother and sister, and by age 18, had auditioned for and was accepted into, the American Academy of Dramatic Arts West in Hollywood, California. She auditioned five times for the role of Kate Denali for The Twilight Saga: Breaking Dawn – Part 1 before finally being cast.

== Filmography ==
- London (2005) as Dominatrix
- Dirty (2005) as Girl in BMW
- The Unknown (2005) as Shea Landers
- Moonlight (2007) as Cherish
- Backyards & Bullets (2007)
- CSI: NY (2008–2009) as Ella McBride
- Skateland (2010) as Candy Boyce
- Notes on Lying (2010) as Annabelle
- The Twilight Saga: Breaking Dawn – Part 1 (2011) as Kate
- Hide Away (2011) as Lauren
- The Twilight Saga: Breaking Dawn – Part 2 (2012) as Kate
- Plush (2013) as Evie
- Free the Nipple (2014) as Cali
- Banshee (2016), as Maggie Bunker (7 episodes)
