= Lists of places where social nudity is practised =

This is a list of public outdoor clothes-free areas for recreation. Includes free beaches (or clothing-optional beaches or nude beaches), parks, clubs, regional organizations and some resorts.

== Regions ==
- List of social nudity places in Africa
- List of social nudity places in Asia
- List of social nudity places in Europe
- List of social nudity places in North America
- List of social nudity places in Oceania
- List of social nudity places in South America

== See also ==
- List of clothing-free events
- List of social nudity organizations
- Naturism
- Nude recreation
