= Tambaba =

Nudist beach in Brazil

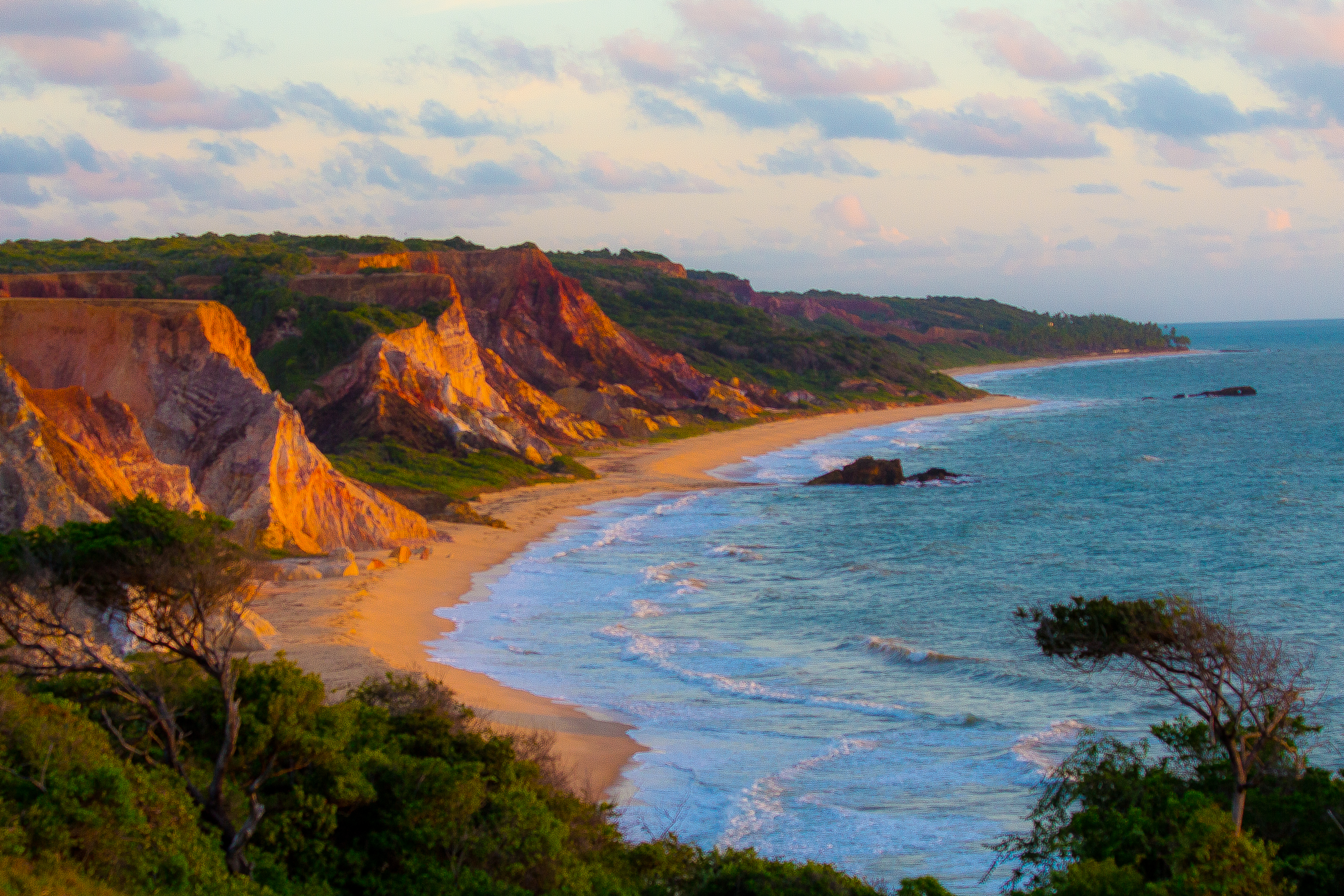
Tambaba

Tambaba is an official nudist beach in Brazil, located on the Atlantic coast 20 km (12 mi) south of João Pessoa and 115 km (71 mi) north of Recife, at 7°21′57″S 34°47′50″W. In Tambaba, one must be nude in the family area (the main part of the beach). Around the periphery of the beach, nudism is optional.

Tambaba is a short beach, about 1 km (0.6 mi). Until recently, the final access road was unpaved. However, as part of the regional infrastructure development, the Ministro Abelardo Jurema highway (PB-008) has been completed and the route is paved from João Pessoa to Tambaba. The beach sits in the municipality of Pitambui in the state of Paraiba and is considered one of the best beaches in Brazil. While famous for its nudist beach, it also has a public beach without nudism.

The area benefits from proximity of the recently expanded BR-101 route from Recife to Joao Pessoa to Natal, as well as to the other beaches of Tabatinga, Praia Bella and Coquerinho. This route is considered of high importance to the economy of Paraíba which is expanding due to the increase in tourism to the areas in and around Tambaba and the wider region including Joao Pessoa.

Tambaba Country Club Resort, a 150 hectare country club, is closely linked to the beach of Tambaba.
