= Doors (film) =

- Directed by: Jeff Desom; Saman Kesh; Dugan O'Neal
- Written by: Jeff Desom; Ed Hobbs; Saman Kesh; Dugan O'Neal; Chris White
- Produced by: Brad Miska; J. D. Lifshitz
- Starring: Josh Peck; Lina Esco; Wilson Bethel; Kyp Malone
- Production company: BoulderLight Pictures
- Distributed by: Bloody Disgusting
- Release date: March 19, 2021
- Running time: 84 minutes
- Country: United States
- Language: English

Doors (also known as Portal in the UK) is a 2021 American science fiction anthology film directed by Jeff Desom, Saman Kesh and Dugan O'Neal and written by Desom, Ed Hobbs, Kesh, O'Neal and Chris White. The film follows several groups of people responding to the sudden appearance of mysterious alien portals, known as "doors", that manifest around the world and are linked to mass disappearances and psychological disturbances. Told through three main segments and a framing device, the story depicts the phenomenon from the perspectives of high-school students, volunteer researchers and a reclusive scientist. Doors was released in select theatres and on video on demand in March 2021, and received mixed reviews; critics generally praised the central premise and some imagery while finding the anthology uneven and underdeveloped.

== Plot ==
The film opens with a disoriented man wandering alone through a forest, apparently having passed through one of a series of mysterious alien portals nicknamed "doors" that have appeared across the world. News reports and radio broadcasts establish that the doors are responsible for mass disappearances and drastic changes to life on Earth.

The first main segment, Lockdown, is set on the day the doors arrive. A group of high-school students sit an exam in detention when a school-wide lockdown is announced. As mobile phones across the building erupt with emergency alerts, the teacher leaves to investigate and does not return. The students eventually venture into the hallway and discover that one of the doors has materialised just outside their classroom. The portal exerts a psychological pull on Ash, a student who begins hearing voices and experiencing visions. Tensions between Ash, their crush Lizzie, and Lizzie's boyfriend Jake escalate into a confrontation, and several of the students are ultimately drawn into the door, vanishing as they step through its shimmering surface.

The second segment, Knockers, takes place about two weeks later. In the wake of the global event, specialised volunteer teams known as "knockers" are sent through the doors on timed research missions, with a strict limit intended to prevent "door psychosis". One such team: Vince, Becky and Patrick, enters a door that has appeared above a secluded house. On the other side, they find a distorted copy of the same building. Each member experiences personalised hallucinations and encounters with doubles that exploit their fears and guilt, including visions tied to Becky's anxiety about an unplanned pregnancy and Patrick's unresolved relationship with an ex-partner. As their allotted time runs out, the environment grows more unstable and the team's sense of identity begins to break down, raising doubts about who, if anyone, has truly returned from the other side.

The third segment, Lamaj, is set roughly one hundred days after the doors first appeared. Jamal, a reclusive scientist living in a forest cabin, has a door located near his home and has constructed equipment that allows him to communicate with the entity associated with it. The intelligence mimics his speech and identifies itself as "Lamaj", a reversed form of his name, suggesting a mirroring of human consciousness. Jamal invites his former colleague Kathy to witness the breakthrough, but she arrives with her sceptical boyfriend Leo, who is more interested in contacting the authorities. As Jamal's conversations with the door grow more intimate and abstract, conflict erupts between the three humans. The encounter culminates in violence and in further evidence that the doors can influence or eliminate people who threaten their purposes.

Between and after the main stories, the film is intercut with images of abandoned cities and segments of an online talk show hosted by Martin Midnight. Through his broadcasts and interviews with theorists, it is suggested that the doors are part of a larger alien process that is observing, reshaping or assimilating humanity on a planetary scale. In the closing scenes, Martin himself appears to be affected by the phenomenon, implying that the influence of the doors extends beyond physical proximity and that the transformation of human consciousness is ongoing.

== Cast ==
- Josh Peck as Vince
- Lina Esco as Becky
- Wilson Bethel as Ricky
- Kyp Malone as Jamal
- Kathy Khanh as Ash

== Release ==
The film was released in select theaters on March 19, 2021, on demand on March 23, 2021 and on DVD and Blu-ray on April 6, 2021.

== Reception ==
The film has a 46% rating on Rotten Tomatoes based on 13 reviews. Buffy de Latour of SciFiNow awarded the film three stars out of five. Alex Saveliev of Film Threat rated the film a 6 out of 10. Jeffrey M. Anderson of Common Sense Media awarded the film three stars out of five. Cath Clarke of The Guardian awarded the film two stars out of five.
