= Go Topless Day =

Gender equality protest

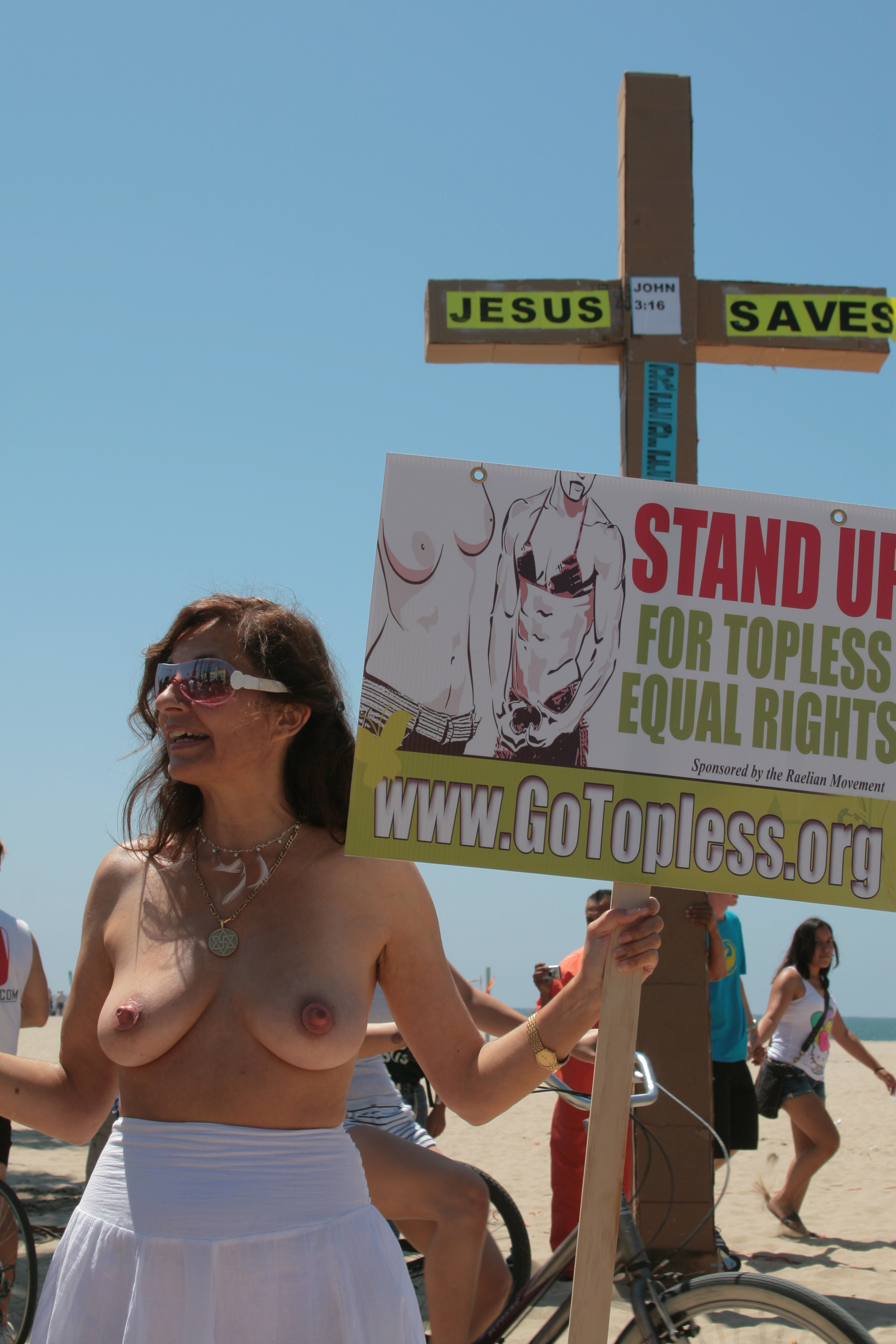
- Go Topless Day protest in California, 2011
- Date: Sunday nearest August 26 (Women's Equality Day)
- Frequency: Annual
- Location: Various
- Inaugurated: 2007; 19 years ago (established); 2008; 18 years ago (first observance)
- Organizer: GoTopless
- Website: gotopless.org

Go Topless Day (also known as National Go Topless Day or International Go Topless Day) is an annual event held in the United States, Canada, and Switzerland to support the right of women to go topless in public on gender-equality grounds. In states where women have that right, topfreedom laws are celebrated, while protests are held in states where topless women are prohibited.

== Organizer ==
The annual event was started in 2007 by GoTopless, a Nevada group formed by Raël, leader of the Raelian Movement, a UFO religion. GoTopless has supported events and chapters in other countries.

== History ==
Go Topless Day was founded in response to the arrest of Phoenix Feeley (Jill Coccaro), a topless activist who was arrested for being topless in public in New York in 2005. The city of New York settled with Feeley for $29,000 because toplessness is legal there.

Go Topless Day is scheduled for the Sunday nearest August 26, Women's Equality Day, a United States holiday celebrating women's suffrage. The event encourages women to go topless in public, and men to cover their chests by wearing brassieres or bikinis.

== Events ==
The first Go Topless Day was organized in 2007.

In 2011, Go Topless Day in the US was held on August 24. Protesters, both men and women, participated in rallies held in thirty cities across twelve U.S. states, including California, New York, Women who participated in the celebration used either fake latex nipples or pasties to cover their nipples and avoid arrest due to laws in some states that prohibit women from showing their areola and nipples in public. The protesters displayed signs that read "Men and women have nipples. Why should women hide theirs?" and "Equal topless rights for all or none". Many men who joined the demonstration wore bras and bikinis to protest against the double standard where men are allowed to go bare chested, but women are prohibited to go topless in public.

The same year saw Go Topless Day celebrated for the first time in Canada, with a rally in Toronto, Ontario, on August 28. Nearly twenty women went topless going from Queen Street East to Kew Beach on a pick-up truck playing the song "Revolution" by The Beatles. According to Diane Brisbois, the spokesperson for Go Topless Canada, "This is not a beauty contest. It is about freedom. We have support; there are many men who come to our events too." The right of women in Canada to go topless was established in 1996, when the Ontario Court of Appeal overturned the 1991 conviction of Gwen Jacob, saying "there was nothing degrading or dehumanizing" about baring her breasts in public.

At a 2014 Go Topless Day rally in Chicago, participant Sonoko Tagami was ticketed for toplessness and fined a total of $140 based on a city ordinance. Tagami sued the city, arguing that the law was unconstitutional under both the Equal Protection Clause of the Fourteenth Amendment and the freedom of speech protections of the First Amendment; the suit was dismissed by the court. Tagami appealed the dismissal, but it was upheld by the Seventh Circuit Appellate Court; Tagami petitioned the Supreme Court for a writ of certiorari, but the petition was denied, upholding the dismissal.

In 2025, pro-topless protesting took place in Switzerland, in the first event organized by the group outside of North America.

== See also ==
- Free the Nipple
- Nudity and protest
- Tissiflashmob
