= Free the nipple =

Topfreedom campaign since 2012

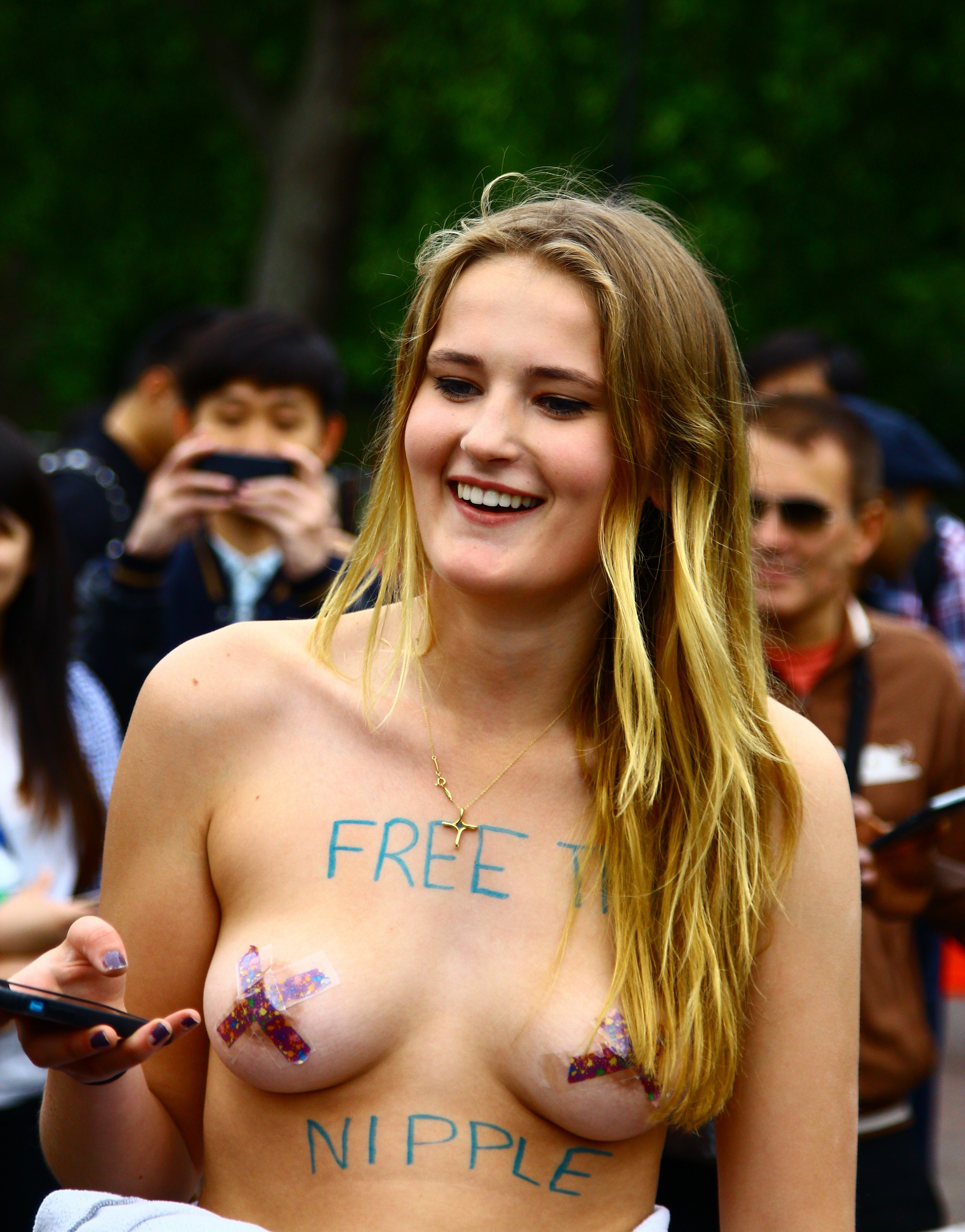
A campaign participant at the World Naked Bike Ride in London, June 2015

Free the nipple is a topfreedom campaign created in 2012 during pre-production of a 2014 film of the same name. The campaign highlights the general convention of allowing men to appear topless in public while considering it sexual, suggestive, or indecent for women to do the same and asserts that this difference is discriminatory, contravening women's rights. The campaign argues that it should be legally and culturally acceptable for women to bare their nipples in public.

== History ==
Historically, women have sometimes been arrested or charged with public indecency, disturbing the peace, or lewd behavior for baring their breasts in public, even in jurisdictions where there was no law explicitly prohibiting doing so. In New York State, female toplessness was made legal around 1990, and when a woman was arrested there in 2005 for appearing topless in public, a court ruled in her favor and she later received US$29,000 in damages.

In 2012, filmmaker Lina Esco created a documentary of herself running through the streets of New York topless. As the documentary was being made, she posted teaser clips with the hashtag #FreeTheNipple. In 2013, Facebook removed these clips from its website for violating its guidelines. In 2014, several celebrities such as Miley Cyrus, Lena Dunham, Chelsea Handler, Rihanna and Chrissy Teigen posted photos on social media to show their support of Esco's initiative.

In 2015, the campaign received attention in Iceland after a teenage student activist posted a photo of herself topless and was harassed for doing so. In support of the student and the initiative, Björt Ólafsdóttir, a Member of Parliament, posted a topless photo of herself in solidarity.

In 2016, two protesters, Tiernan Hebron and UCSD graduate student Anni Ma were arrested for indecent exposure outside of a campaign appearance for Senator Bernie Sanders on 23 March. They appeared topless except for pieces of tape over their nipples, and had the words "Free the Nipple", "Equality", and "Feel the Bern" written on their chests. Los Angeles Police officers asked them to cover their breasts, and the two women refused and were arrested. They were held for 25 hours in jail but were not charged with any crime. After being released, Ma filed a federal lawsuit against the Los Angeles Police Department. Ma said that her action was not lewd because mammary glands are not sexual organs, but rather have the purpose of breastfeeding children, and said she believed she did not at any point show her "genitals" or "private parts". Her attorney claims she was never "nude" and that California's indecent exposure law applies only to genitals, not breasts. Her lawsuit also alleged that her constitutional rights had been violated, that she had been subject to unlawful gender discrimination, and that federal civil rights laws had been violated. She was topless at a Bernie Sanders campaign rally, 19 March 2016, in Phoenix, Arizona, and she was led to the back of the venue without incident. On 23 January 2016, Anni Ma, as a FEMEN activist, Carly Mitchell, Chelsea Ducote and Marston protested at a "Walk For Life" event at the San Francisco City Hall and the Civic Center.

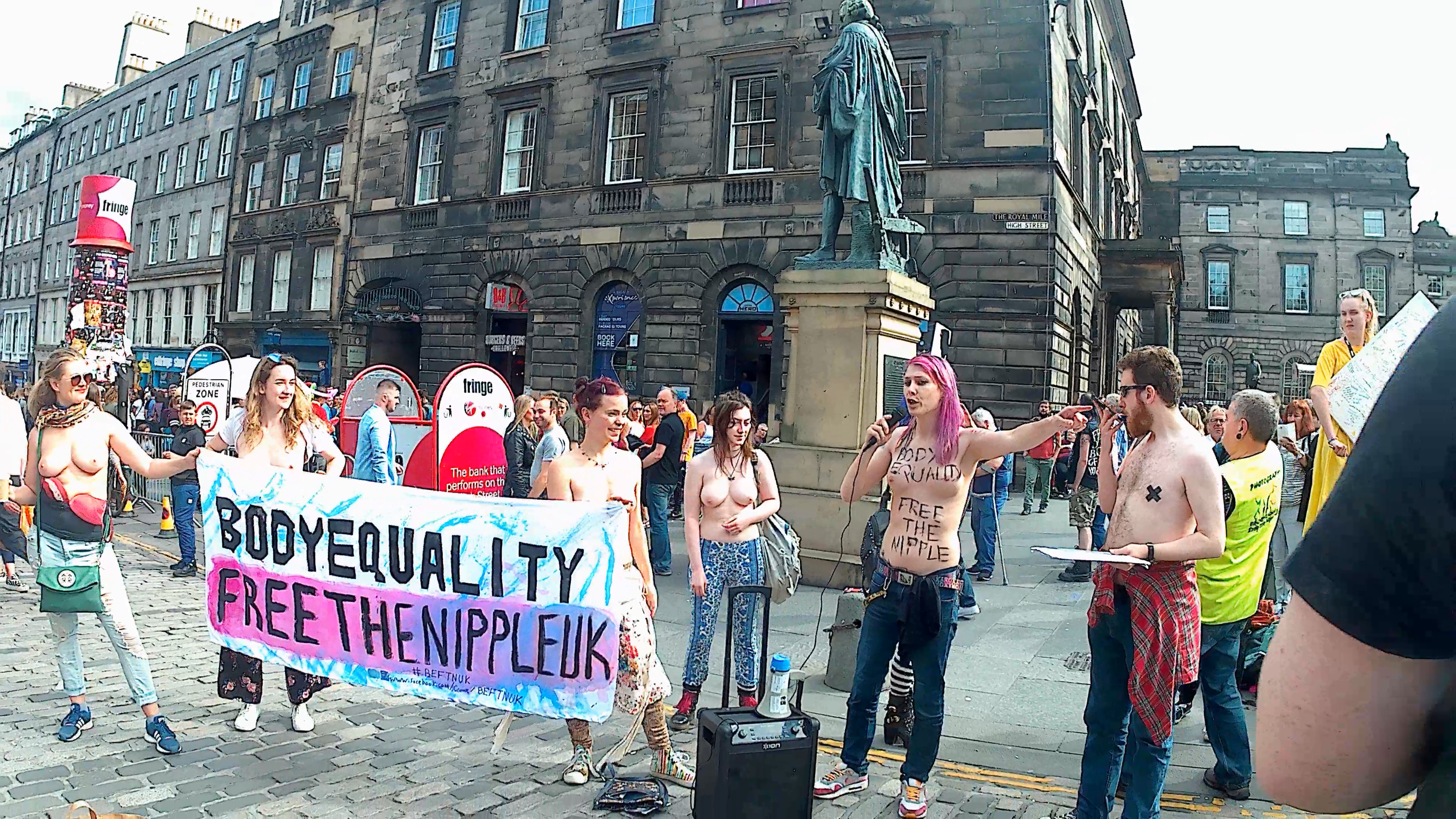
Free the Nipple protest at the 2017 Edinburgh Festival Fringe

Free the nipple bike ride protest at Brandenburg Gate, Berlin, Germany, 4th July 2026

Free the nipple events were held in Brighton, England, in 2016, 2017 and 2018. The Free the Nipple Brighton group is headed up by Bee Nicholls and Mickey F, both of Brighton. There was also a Free the Nipple event in 2017, held in Charleston, West Virginia. and one was held in Hull, England, on 26 August 2017. The date is celebrated as Women's Equality Day and Go Topless Day, being the anniversary of the Nineteenth Amendment to the United States Constitution in 1920 which gave US women the right to vote.

== Court cases ==
Various court cases in the United States have involved the question of whether women may publicly expose their breasts. Two examples are Erie v. Pap's A. and Barnes v. Glen Theatre. These involved ordinances that placed restrictions on how women were legally permitted to appear in public, focusing on banning any public exposure of the female breasts. A lawsuit was filed as Free the Nipple v. City of Fort Collins, which was an attempt to remove the provision in the municipal code of Fort Collins, Colorado, that prohibits women from revealing their breasts. The federal lawsuit was won at the appellate level. In September 2019, after spending over $300,000, Fort Collins decided to stop defending their ordinance and repeal it. That effectively gave women of all ages the right to go topless wherever men can in the jurisdiction of the 10th Circuit (the states of Wyoming, Utah, Colorado, New Mexico, Kansas and Oklahoma, including all their cities).

There are two U.S. states where the mere showing of women's breasts is illegal: Indiana and Tennessee.

== Social media campaign ==
Every major social media platform has its guidelines and policy regarding nudity and revealing nipples. Facebook only allows photos of nipples to be posted when it is "in the context of breastfeeding, birth giving and after-birth moments, health (for example, post-mastectomy, breast cancer awareness, or gender reassignment surgery), or an act of protest."

Instagram generally censors nipples on women's bodies. Instagram's guideline for nudity states "We know that there are times when people might want to share nude images that are artistic or creative in nature, but for a variety of reasons, we don't allow nudity on Instagram. This includes photos, videos, and some digitally-created content that show sexual intercourse, genitals, and close-ups of fully-nude buttocks. It also includes some photos of female nipples, but photos of post-mastectomy scarring and women actively breastfeeding are allowed. Nudity in photos of paintings and sculptures is OK, too." This is an update from Instagram's historic community guidelines, which included the ambiguous phrase "keep your clothes on." Instagram's former CEO Kevin Systrom said that because of the Apple's App Store regulations, every app needs an age rating. If an app contains nudity, it has to be rated 17+. The CEO would prefer Instagram remain at its current rating of 12+, to attract a younger audience.

Pinterest allows artistic and non-sexualized nudity. Their reasoning on why they allow nudity and mature content is for "art, safe sex education or advocacy for political protests".

Differing rules are applied by other social media and these change with time. In 2014, YouTube had no specific policy that barred nipples, but the platform did not allow sexually explicit material. Google+ had a policy of not allowing nipples to be shown unless they were in cartoons. Flickr and Tumblr allowed users to control how much nudity they wanted to see, but when the filtering was switched off there were no restrictions. Twitter placed no restrictions on female nudity. In 2018, Tumblr changed its rules to ban "female-presenting nipples" and other nudity, though these restrictions were relaxed in 2022. Google+ was shut down in 2019.

A tactic that activists have taken up is the use of the hashtag #FreeTheNipple. This tag has been used on Facebook, Instagram and Twitter, where it can be used for searching the databases for posts with the same tag.

== Film and television ==
In 2014, director Lina Esco released her American feature film Free the Nipple. The film is centered around a group of young women who take to the streets of New York City as they protest the legal and cultural taboos regarding female breasts by way of publicity stunts, graffiti installations, and First Amendment lawyers. After shooting the film in 2012, Esco found it difficult to get the film widely released, motivating her to start the campaign in December 2013.

In episode 106 of The Bold Type, the main character, Kat, participates in the campaign on social media by going against Instagram's guidelines by posting pictures with male nipples pasted onto women's bodies. In the episode, Kat said that freeing the nipple is more than just about Instagram and more about equality.

== Influential people ==
Some celebrities have expressed support for the #FreeTheNipple movement on social media, including Miley Cyrus, Lena Dunham, Jennifer Aniston, Scout Willis, Rihanna, Cara Delevingne, Naomi Campbell and Florence Pugh. Florence Pugh, in an interview with Vogue, addressed comments on her red carpet gown and said, "If I'm happy in it, then I’m gonna wear it. Of course, I don't want to offend people, but I think my point is: How can my nipples offend you that much?"

Miley Cyrus publicly supported the movement in 2014 when she posted a topless photo of herself on Instagram. The caption included #freethenipple. The photo was quickly flagged and taken down from Instagram. Even with pushback she continued to post photos online, including photos of a cut out of her face on nude dolls and other topless women. Since 2014 she has pushed the boundaries of this movement, continuing to express herself through media, clothing and speech. In 2015 she appeared on Jimmy Kimmel Live!, a popular late night talk show since 2003. When she lifted her top to reveal the sparkly heart patches covering her chest, Kimmel said "now I am embarrassed". Speaking about the campaign, Cyrus said: "The nipple, what you can't show, is what everyone has. But the jug part that everybody doesn't, you're allowed to show underboob. I've never understood the way it works".

Scout Willis, daughter of American actor Bruce Willis, went shopping topless in New York City in 2014 shortly after Miley Cyrus's Instagram post was deleted. After her shopping trip Willis posted a photo to Twitter (now X) with the comment "Legal in NYC but not on @instagram". She followed it with another comment and attached photo saying "What @instagram won't let you see". Instagram has community guidelines prohibiting nudity, which led to a mother's account being temporarily deactivated in 2017 after she posted a photo showing her breastfeeding her child.

Charli XCX wore a sheer black dress to the Brit Awards 2025, broadcast on television by ITV, and began an award acceptance speech with the comment: "I heard that ITV were complaining about my nipples. I feel like we're in the era of free the nipple though, right?". She was applauded by the audience for the comment, and added: "They put the clap track on, cool. Thanks for being on my side."

== The Nipple Bra ==
In October 2023, Kim Kardashian posted an announcement on Instagram about the upcoming release of "The Ultimate Nipple Bra" by her clothing company Skims. The Nipple Bra, which simulates the appearance of hard nipples, sold out in under a month following its release. According to an article in The Washington Post, purchasers liked that the bra was able "to offer a sort of controlled bralessness" meaning "that it enhances the bust such that you look like you’re wearing a T-shirt over a pristine breast augmentation or 'idealized' pair of natural breasts". Lina Esco commented that "anything to help get the nipple to be finally free is important".

== Dress codes ==
The "free the nipple" movement challenges double standards in societal norms while advocating for gender equality through dress codes. These regulations often permit men to go shirtless or at least wear a shirt without undergarments while women are often prohibited from attending school without abiding by these rules. It aims for equal treatment for men's and women's dress codes. It promotes self-acceptance and societal acceptance to challenge the stigma surrounding female bodies being sexualized. For example, the dress code policy from the Glenbrook South High School handbook states that an appropriate dress code, "promotes self-respect, balances social responsibility with self-expression and is free of distracting, disruptive, threatening or offensive diversions from the educational process."

== See also ==
- Breastfeeding in public
- Clothing laws by country
- Go Topless Day
- Tissiflashmob
