= Praia do Abricó =

Brazilian nude beach in Rio

Coordinates: 23°02′53″S 43°30′47″W

Praia do Abricó is a nude beach located in Grumari, a sub district of Barra da Tijuca neighborhood, in the western part of the city of Rio de Janeiro, Brazil. It is currently the only beach that permits the practice of naturism in the city. It is officially affiliated to the Brazilian Federation of Naturism (FBrN).

== History ==
Locals used the beach for naturism since the 1940s. In the 1950s, Luz del Fuego and her group visited the beach.

Avenida Estado da Guanabara opened in 1972, which facilitated further access to this beach. In 1992 the then Municipal Secretary of Environment of Rio de Janeiro, Alfredo Sirkis, suggested to the mayor Cesar Maia that he should approve a bill authorizing the practice of naturism there, the law passed in 1994, with a lawsuit failing to stop it.

== Gallery ==
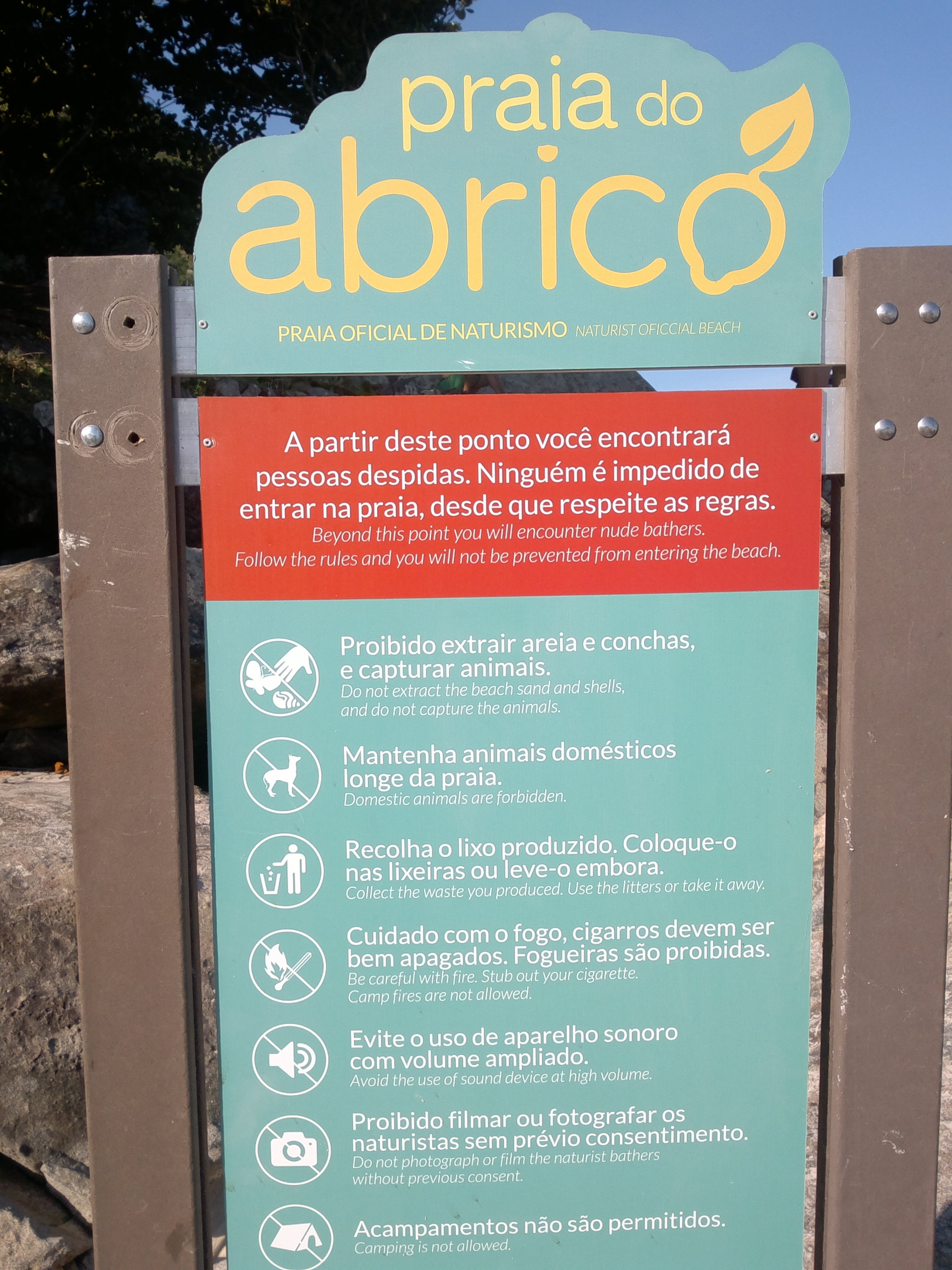
Entrance board with the rules of Abricó Nude Beach

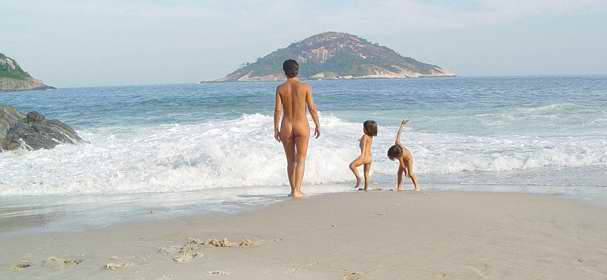
Naked mother and children at the Abricó beach

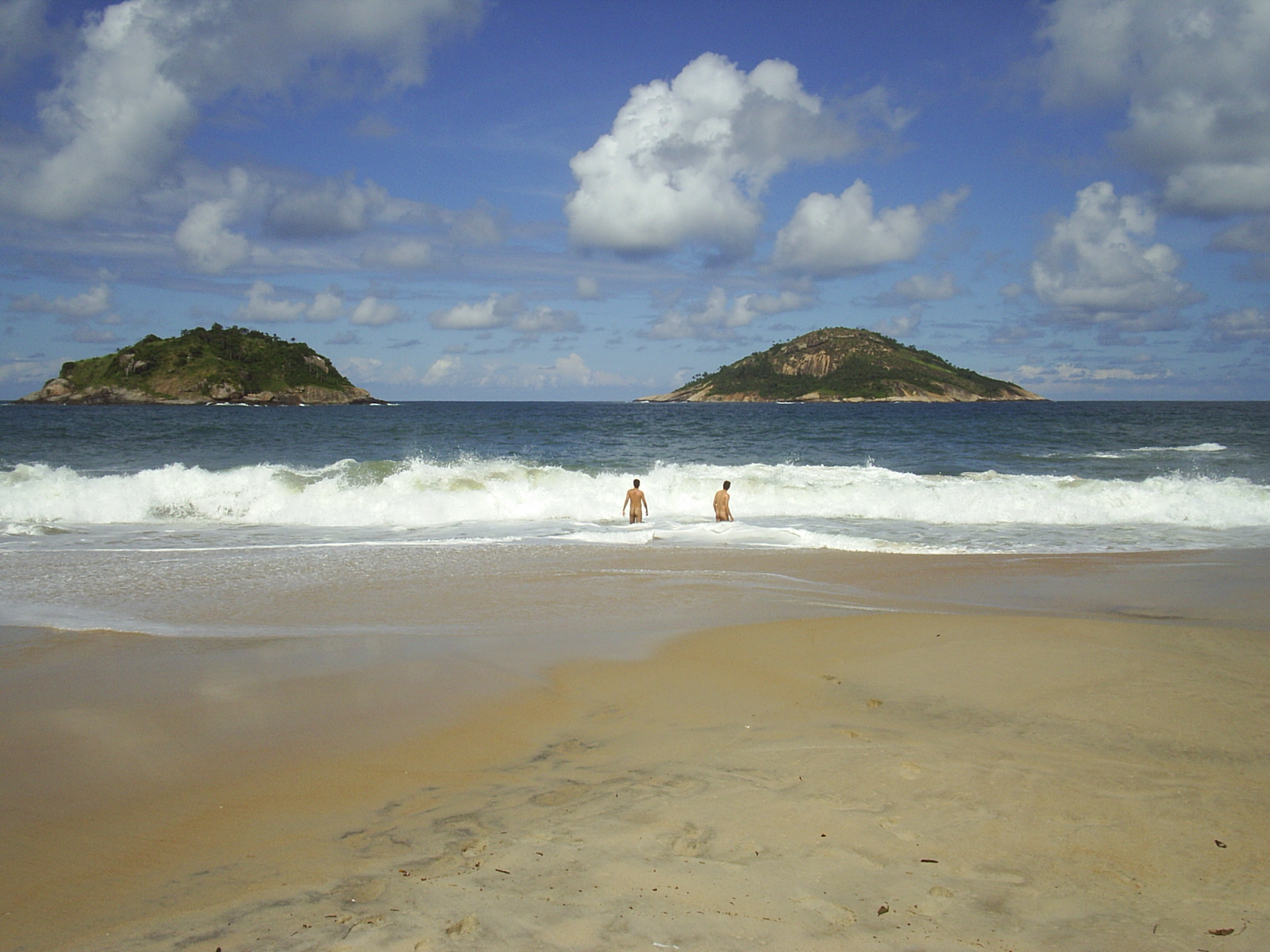
Abricó Beach
