= Playa Luna =

Nude beach in Chile

Coordinates: 32°42′3″S 71°27′41″W

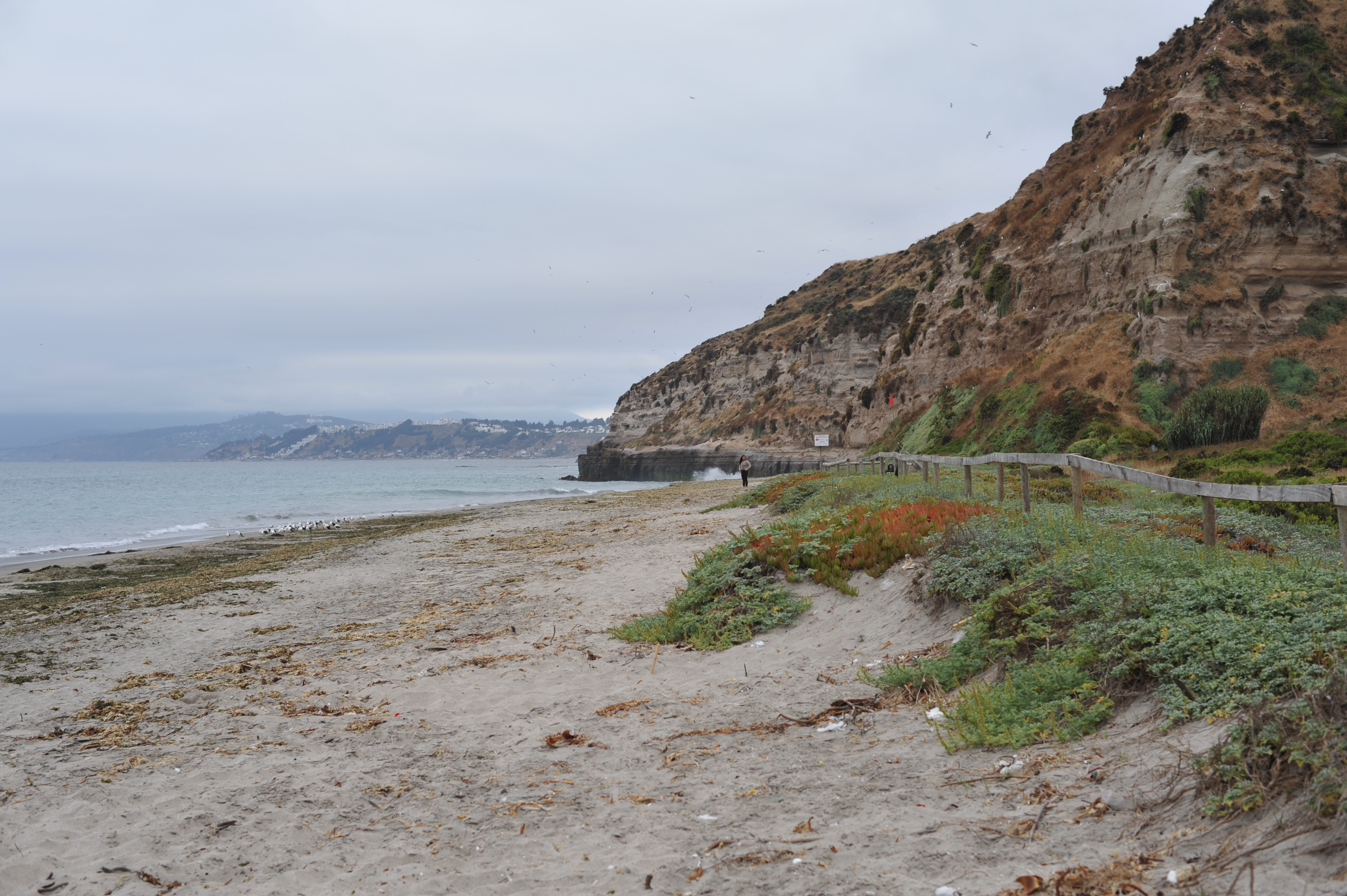
Playa Luna.

Playa Luna (english Moon Beach) is the name popularly known Horcon's nude beach. This is the only nude beach that exists in Chile. It is located in the Valparaíso Region, in the commune of Puchuncaví, near the town of Horcon and very close Maitencillo Resort. Access is via the south coastal road leading from Viña del Mar and Concon, on the north by Route from Papudo and Zapallar and on the east from Route CH-5 North via Nogales.

The name "Playa Luna" is because that is the association with the nudist group of the same name, whose creator is René Rojas, pioneer of organized naturism in Chile, who along with a group of nudists were organized and named the beach, for then create the "Playa Luna Club". The site is known since the '60s as a meeting of some hippies and pioneers nudists, but only in 2000 was officially recognized as a nudist beach.

Playa Luna emerged as a need to have a proper place where to settle after the old Cau-Cau Beach, also located in Horcon, was invaded by condominium developments during the 1990s. The Cau-Cau nudist began migrating further north and some settled at the end of the long beach of Horcón, on the beach formerly called "playa la Iglesia" (english The Church Beach), naming it "Playa Luna".

Every summer, Playa Luna is visited by hundreds of visitors, which make this place the meeting point of the Chilean nudists. Like all beaches of Chile, is public and freely accessible. In Playa Luna, there is no discrimination by sexual orientation, race, social status, sex, political or religious status, and the atmosphere is extremely liberal.
