= Chihuahua, Uruguay =

Chihuahua
- Resort
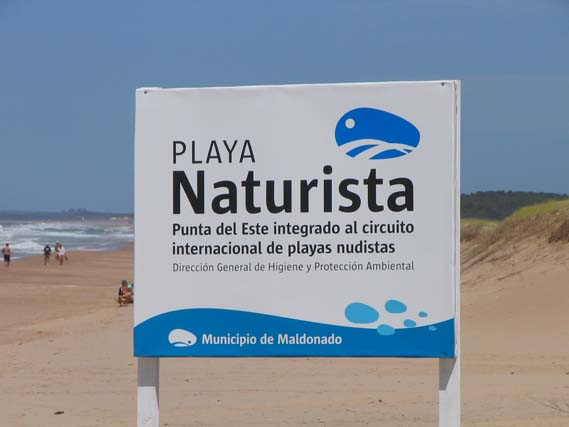
- Sign on the naturist beach

- Location in Uruguay
- Coordinates: 34°52′30″S 55°5′20″W
- Country: Uruguay
- Department: Maldonado Department

Population (2011)
  - Total: 37
- Time zone: UTC -3
- Postal code: 20003
- Dial plan: +598 42 (+6 digits)

Chihuahua is a resort (balneario) in the Maldonado Department of Uruguay.

== Geography ==
The resort is located on the coast of Río de la Plata, about 12 kilometres (7.5 mi) east of the resort Punta Negra. To the east the resort Punta Ballena and to the west it borders the resort Ocean Park with the stream Arroyo del Portero separating it with the later. This stream carries the water of the Laguna del Sauce to the Río de la Plata.

== Population ==
In 2011, Chihuahua had a population of 37 permanent inhabitants and 79 dwellings.

Year	Population	Dwellings
1975	0	5
1985	0	7
1996	7	11
2004	8	38
2011	37	79

Source: Instituto Nacional de Estadística de Uruguay

== See also ==
- Naturism in Uruguay
