= Nude beach =

Beach where public nudity is practiced

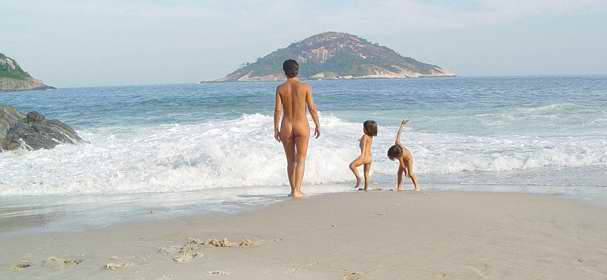
Family in Abricó Beach, Brazil

A nude beach, sometimes called a clothing-optional or free beach, is a beach where users are at liberty to be nude. Nude beaches usually have mixed bathing. Such beaches are usually on public lands, and any member of the public is allowed to use the facilities without membership in any movement or subscription to any personal belief. The use of the beach facilities is normally anonymous. Unlike a naturist resort or facility, there is normally no membership or vetting requirement for the use of a nude beach. The use of nude beach facilities is usually casual, not requiring pre-booking. Nude beaches may be official (legally sanctioned), unofficial (tolerated by residents and law enforcement), or illegal.

The number of nude beaches in some countries is relatively low, and they are generally located some distance away from the city. Access is at times more difficult than at a regular beach and the facilities at these beaches tend to be very basic with a few notable exceptions. In other countries, like Denmark, most beaches are clothing-optional. Nude swimming is one of the most common forms of nudity in public. A nude beach should not be confused with a topless beach (or top-free beach), where upper body clothing is not required for women or men, although a swimming costume covering the genital area is required for both men and women. A nude beach should be considered as a clothes-free beach.

Nude beaches tend to be separate or isolated physically from non-nude bathing areas. In other instances people maintain a comfortable space between beach users. Signage is often used to warn unfamiliar beach users about the specially designated areas on the beach. This accommodates people who are not comfortable with nudity, as well as nude beach users who do not like to be watched by clothed individuals, particularly those engaged in voyeurism.

== Types of nude beaches ==
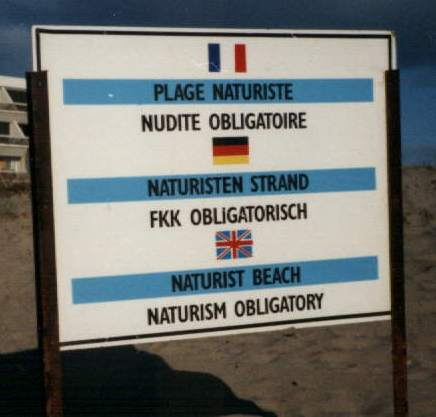
Sign on the beach at Cap d'Agde, France, informing that naturism is obligatory at this beach

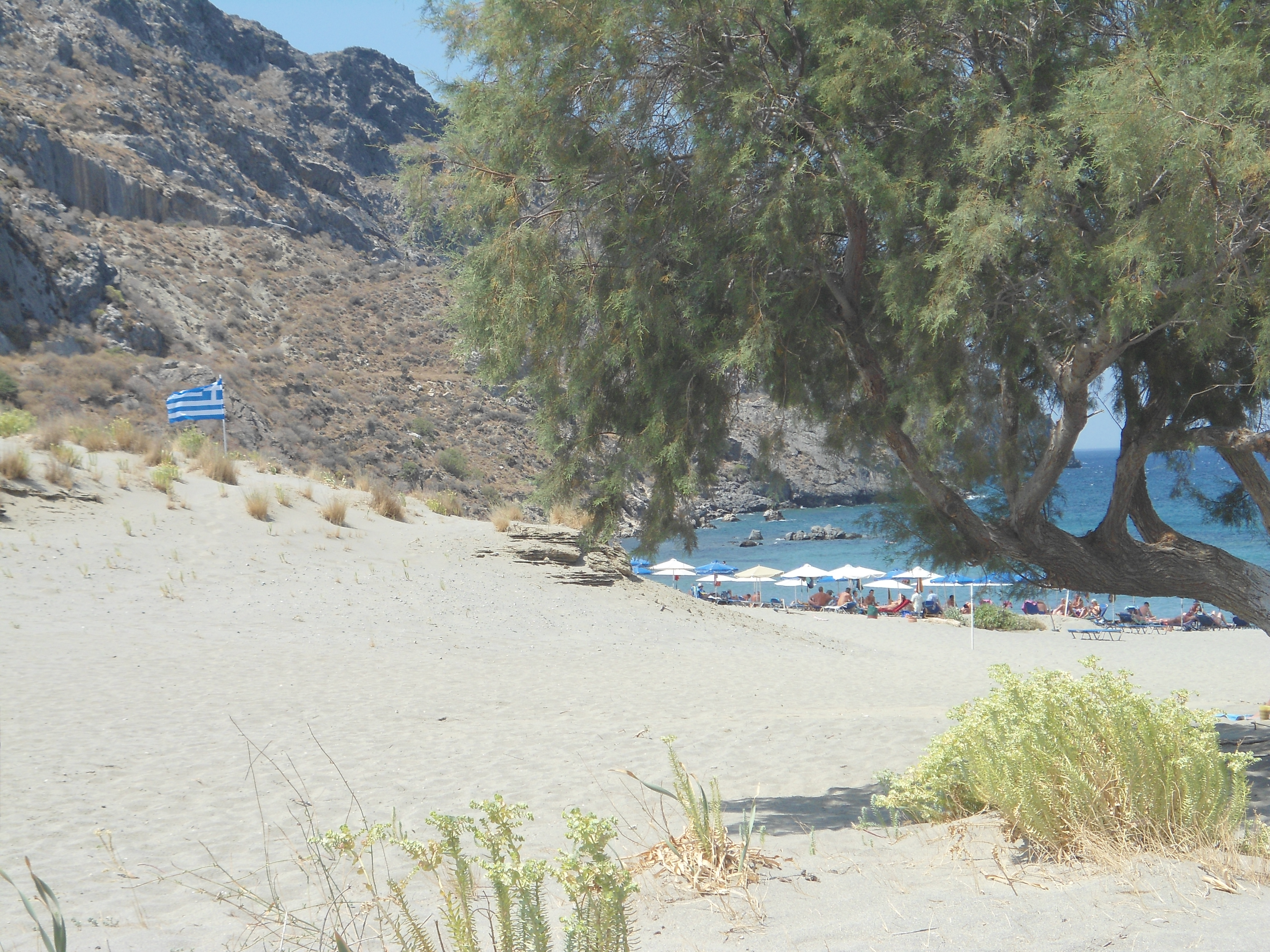
The last part of the eastern part of the beach of Plakias in the south of the Prefecture of Rethymno in Crete (Greece) that is used mainly by tourists for nudism

There are several categories of nude beaches:

- Beaches where nudity is required, subject to weather conditions. This type of nude beach is common at dedicated naturist resorts.
- Beaches where nudity is encouraged, but not mandatory. This type of nude beach is common when the beach is part of a private resort or other private property. On such beaches, most people go nude, but some do not.

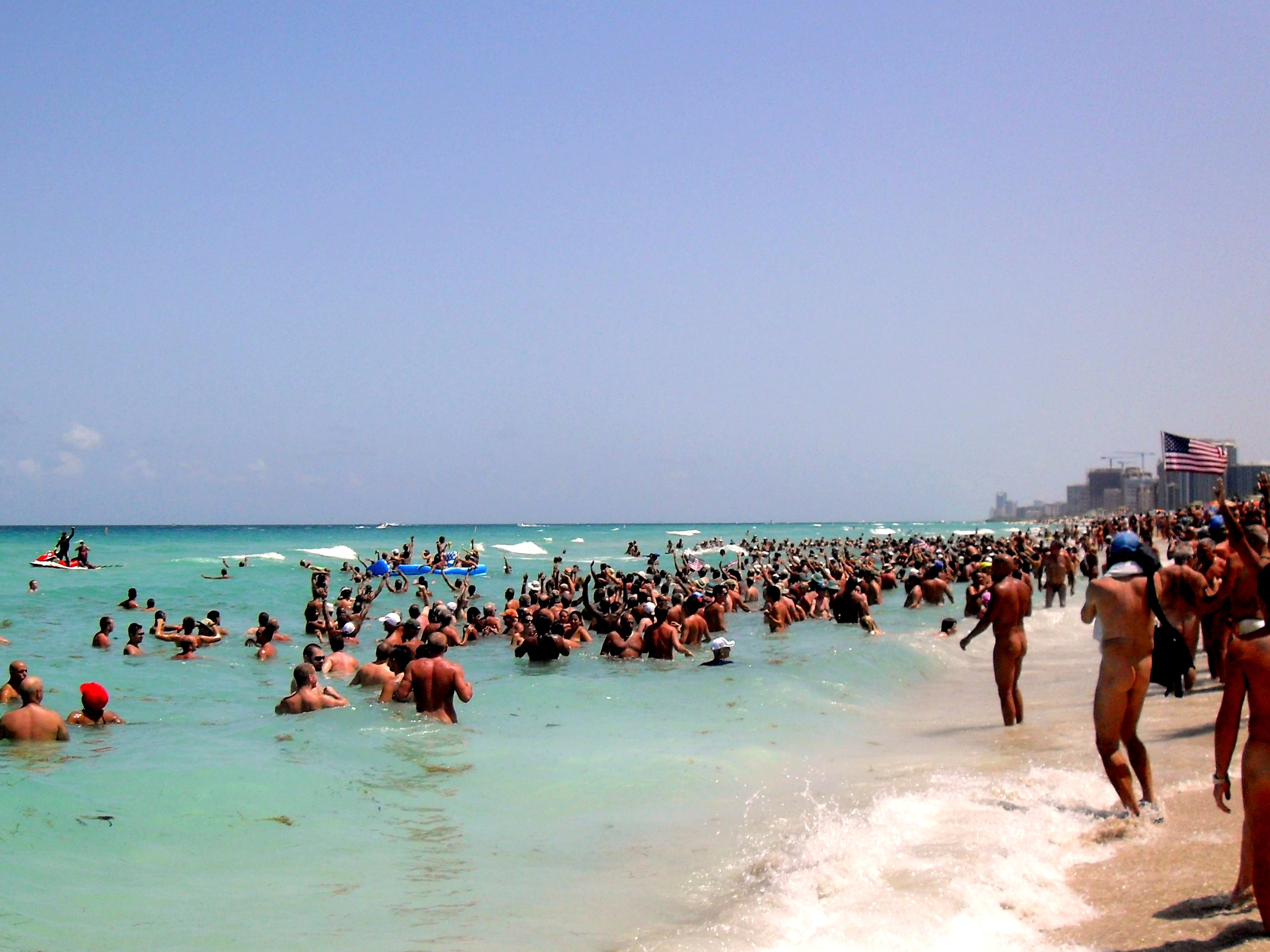
Haulover Park, Florida, United States

- Beaches where nudity is permitted, but not mandatory (i.e. clothing-optional beaches). Most beaches in Denmark and some in Norway are clothing-optional. A large and popular U.S. clothing-optional beach is Haulover Park in Bal Harbour, Florida, which has a clothing-optional section officially designated by Miami-Dade County. On such beaches, there may be a mixture of nude people and clothed people. For some clothed people, the clothing-optional status makes them less reluctant to expose themselves briefly when changing clothes.
- Beaches where nudity is illegal, but tolerated by the authorities. Beaches in this category are generally public beaches where the authorities turn a blind eye to nudity by not enforcing local laws.

== Legal status ==
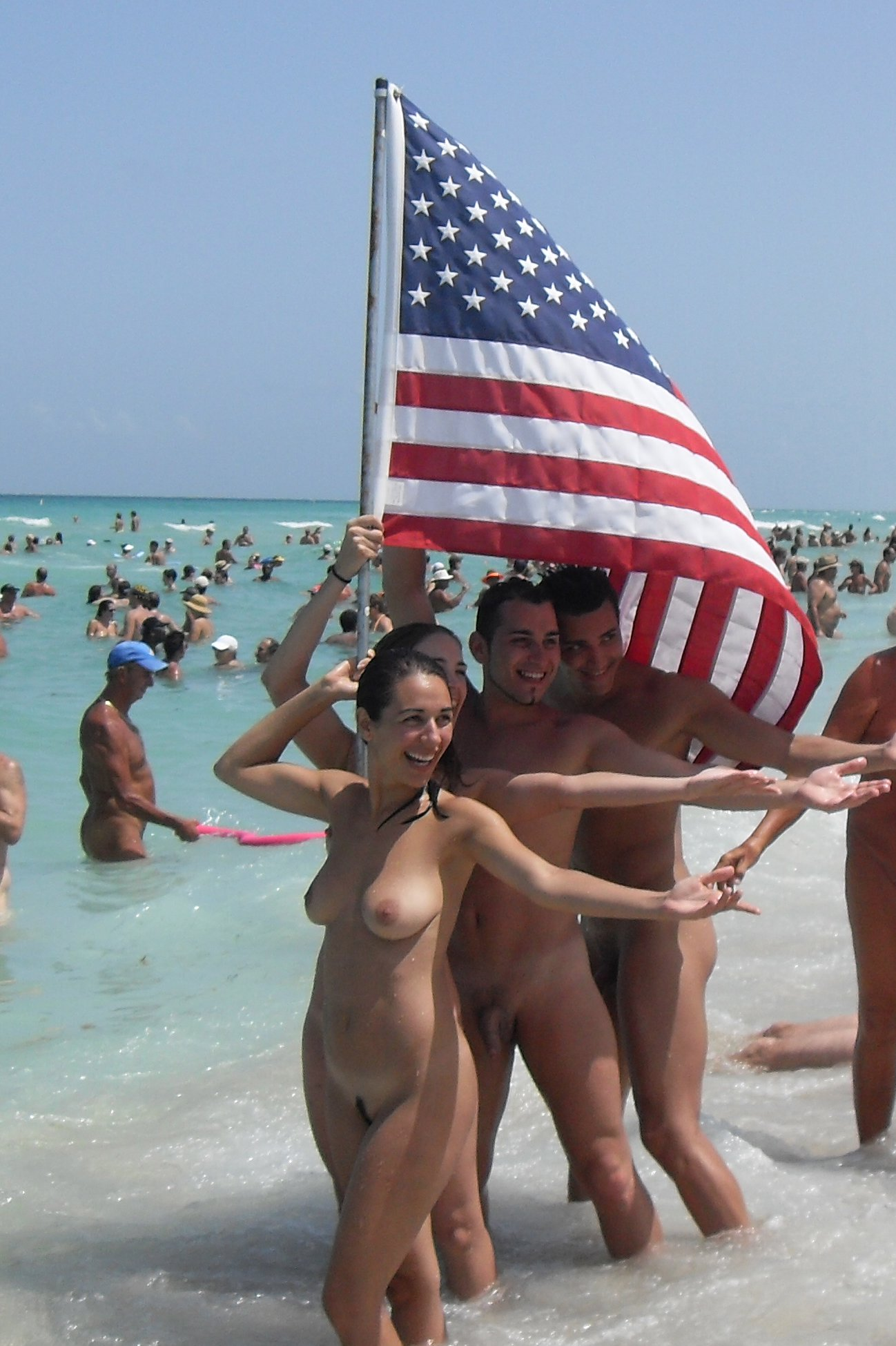
A group of naturist friends at Haulover Park beach, US

Most beaches around the world, including nude beaches, are on public land. Hence access to the beach is typically unrestricted and clothing standards are usually governed by local laws or customs. This applies, for example, to the islands in the Caribbean, Mexico, and Florida. On the Seven Mile Beach in Negril, Jamaica, for example, though the beach is lined with private resorts with fences down to the sand/waterline, the beach itself is open to the public. Though actual clothing standards vary from resort to resort, the beach area is officially designated as "topfree", and public access is unrestricted.

The Hibiscus Coast Local Municipality in South Africa formalize an existing clothing-optional beach within the Mpenjati Nature Reserve.

There are eight officially regulated naturist beaches in Brazil, but they are not "clothing optional". Nudity is required, and single men are not allowed unless they have a membership card from a recognized naturist organization. Otherwise, they are similar to other self-regulated naturist beaches, asserting that nudity is natural, and need not be sexual.

The International Naturist Federation has developed a code of conduct, or etiquette, for use by member organizations. The INF nude beach etiquette requires the avoidance of all forms of sexual harassment and sexual activity, such as masturbation or sexual intercourse. Predatory behavior is not permitted, nor is unauthorized photography. In general, the standards call for the respecting of the privacy of other visitors. Staring is frowned upon by rule and social pressure.

Violations of these norms is not unheard of, sexual activity being reported at Ladies Bay beach in Auckland, New Zealand.

However, unlike naturist resorts and hotels, which can enforce standards of conduct on their properties promptly and effectively, most nude beaches are on public lands, and standards of nude beach behaviour are enforced by local and national laws and customs.

== History ==
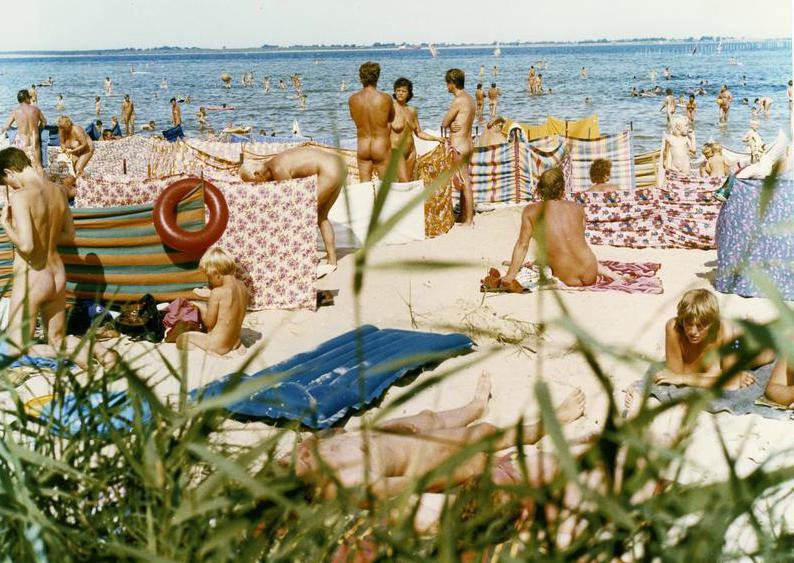
Vintage image of German sunbathers at Marina Hohen Wieschendorf, Mecklenburg-Vorpommern, Bay of Wismar, 1984

On July 17, 1894, Toronto city council set aside a 200-foot section of Hanlan's Point Beach for men to swim nude. The bylaw remained in place until 1930 when it was superseded by a blanket ban on nude bathing. In 1920, Germany had already opened its first official nude beach in Kampen on the island of Sylt. In 1936, King Edward VIII and his lover Wallis Simpson took a charter cruise along the Adriatic Sea. They visited a beach on the Croatian island of Rab, where the local authorities granted the King special permission to swim in the nude. This event marked the beginning of nudist tourism in Croatia. Nude beaches became popular in the 1950s along the French coast and have since spread around the world, though they are still few and far between. Some nude beaches are part of a larger nude area, such as the Cap d'Agde area. Most beaches in Denmark and some beaches in Norway are clothing-optional. In Germany there are clothes optional sunbathing areas in public parks, e.g., Munich and Berlin. Beaches in some holiday destinations, such as Crete, are also clothing-optional, except some central urban beaches. There are two centrally located clothes-optional beaches in Barcelona.

The 1960s and 1970s saw some tolerance for nude beaches in the United States. An example was Jacob Riis Park, where nudity was limited to "Bay One" the northernmost section informally demarcated by jetties. Originally frequented by gay men, popularity expanded to traditional naturists, including families. When the park became part of the Gateway National Recreation Area in 1972, Federal law superseded local indecent exposure laws. In 1974 a city law was passed specifically prohibiting nudity in the park, but the U.S. Park Police continued their policy of leniency unless other laws were being violated. Nudity was made illegal by a state law in 1983.

Though free beaches developed separately from national naturist bodies, some of these bodies have taken an interest and helped to protect them legally, and through the publication of guidelines of acceptable behaviour. In North America, the Free Beach Movement was the name of a group that was opposed to the direction of the official nudist organisation, the American Association for Nude Recreation, and set up the rival body The Naturist Society. Clothes free organizations and free beach associations, such as the Naturist Action Committee, lobby for the removal of laws which prohibit nude swimming and sunbathing or the increase in the number of nude beaches and sometimes to improve the amenities at nude beaches.

== See also ==
- Freikörperkultur
- List of places where social nudity is practised
- Naturism
- Nude recreation
- Nude swimming
- Nudity
