= Aguas Dulces =

- Village
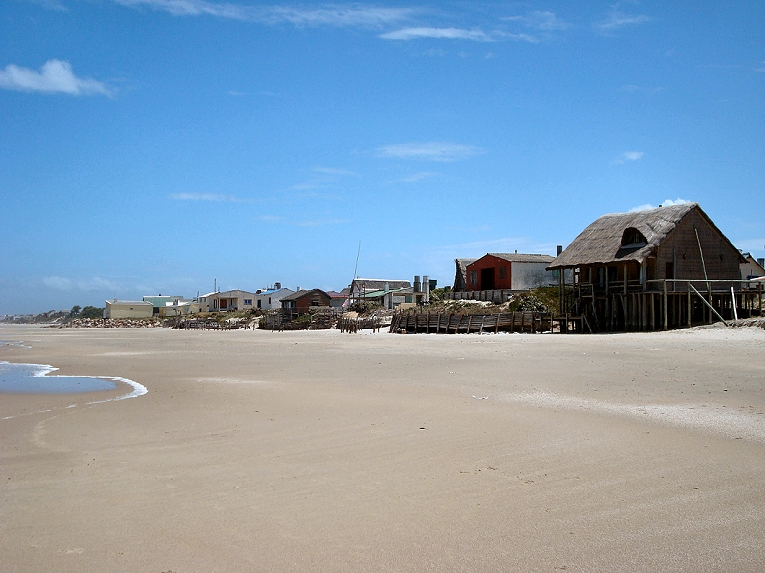

- Location in Uruguay
- Coordinates: 34°16′35″S 53°47′0″W
- Country: Uruguay
- Department: Rocha Department

Population (2011)
  - Total: 417
- Time zone: UTC -3
- Postal code: 27202
- Dial plan: +598 4475 (+4 digits)
- Climate: Cfa

Aguas Dulces is a resort in the Rocha Department of southeastern Uruguay.

== Geography ==
The resort is located at the east end (on Km. 277.5) of Route 10 and the south end of Route 16, on the coast of the Atlantic Ocean, about 11 kilometres (6.8 mi) southeast of Castillos and between the lagoons Laguna de Castillos and Laguna Negra. Its nominal distance from Montevideo is 288 km, using Ruta Interbalnearia, Route 9 and Route 16 (via Castillos).

== Population ==
In 2011 Aguas Dulces had a population of 417 permanent inhabitants and 1,596 dwellings.

Year	Population	Dwellings
1963	74	562
1975	120	1,027
1985	145	989
1996	247	1,183
2004	409	1,437
2011	417	1,596

Source: Instituto Nacional de Estadística de Uruguay
