= List of German utopian communities =

List of utopian communities in Germany 1890-1933

"The settlement is the way to the healthy, strong human of the future, to a completely new, organic lifestyle and thereby closes all other questions of our times."

— Gustav Adolf Küppers

"We are striving for the paradise of the earth. [...] We have recognized and banned the inhuman brutality and degeneracy of today's society."

— Karl Wilhelm Diefenbach

German utopian communities are historic intentional communities that were formed in wake of various social movements from the mid-19th century until the 1930s. Estimates show that around 100 communities were created between 1918 and 1933, but data is unreliable. Although communities were ideologically diverse, they shared a common sense of mission as role models for German society at large.

== Background ==
The settlement movement was party inspired by romanticized ideas of agriculture, which had been popular since antiquity, such as Arcadia and the Garden of Eden. It was also influenced by land reforms caused by population boom, urbanization and ensuing poverty.

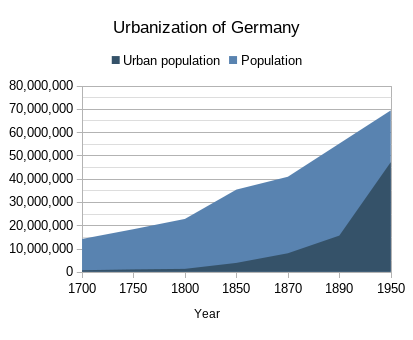
Population and urban population of Germany (1700 to 1950)

Due to technological, medical and agricultural advances, the population of the European continent doubled during the 19th century, from approximately 200 million to more than 400 million. Approximately 70 million people emigrated from Europe, with most migrating to the United States. The countries also urbanized, with the populations of numerous cities worldwide growing to over a million.

The land reform movement began in Europe in the 1830s. Based on David Ricardo's law of rent, English Chartists argued that private land ownership was the cause of urban poverty. The theory was adapted through various influential social economists such as Karl Marx, Friedrich Engels, Karl Kautsky and Eduard Bernstein. John Stuart Mill, who endorsed nationalizing land but compensating landowners, founded the Land Tenure Reform Association in 1868; Henry George popularized a version of the proposal, in which land rents are nationalized without compensation but property rights are preserved, in his 1879 work Progress and Poverty.

An early proponent of land reform in Germany was Hermann Gossen with his 1854 book Die Entwicklung der Gesetze des menschlichen Verkehrs und der daraus fließenden Regeln für menschliches Handeln. The Austrian Theodor Hertzka published the utopian novel Freiland, ein soziales Zukunftsbild in 1889, promoting emigration to the "empty" New World. In opposition to this, Franz Oppenheimer published Freiland in Deutschland in 1894, arguing for cooperative-based settlements in Germany. Both were influenced by George, and agreed that it was possible to overcome capitalism—not through political conquest, but by cooperative economic subversion, which they claimed would naturally lead to social justice. Although Hertzka criticized their theories, Freiland can be seen in the tradition of Owenism and Fourierism. Hertzka also influenced Theodor Herzl, the founder of the ideology of Zionism. Herzl's Der Judenstaat was published as a direct reply to Hertzka in 1896, and his Altneuland, his best-elaborated vision for the Jewish state, mirrors the structure of Freiland. In 1911, Oppenheimer was involved in the creation of the moshav Merhavia in Ottoman Palestine on the basis of co-operative land ownership.

The Prussian and later German government also designed official land reform programmes with limited success. In 1886 the Prussian Settlement Commission was created in West Prussia and Posen motivated by racist beliefs to increase the Germanization of former Polish territories. The Commission oversaw developing administrative infrastructure for interior colonization in the German Reich such as centers of counseling, pension banks, cooperatives and private settlement companies like the Pommersche Ansiedlungsgesellschaft(1903) and Ostpreußische Landgesellschaft(1905). Dense city centers were untangled through the use of suburbs, allotment gardens and garden cities. Related publications were collected in the Archiv für innere Kolonisation beginning in 1908. Ideas for the accommodation of soldiers returning from war originated in the start of World War I. The Reichssiedlunggesetz ("Imperial Settlement Act") was passed in 1919. To hasten the resettlement of refugees from Poland the Flüchtlingssiedlungsgesetz ("Refugee Settlement Act") was passed in 1923, leading to the relocation of about 2,500 refugees. Although settlements had been discussed as means to relieve urban poverty since 1918, results were "sobering". Only 26,343 new settlements were created between 1919 and 1928; and 21,602 of these were in Prussia. This meant that only 25% of the intended area (Landlieferungssoll) of 1,413,706 ha (about 5,500 sq miles) was achieved.

In 1931 three new laws were passed to create 100,000 new settlements. But the cabinet was overturned in May 1932 due to accusations of "Settlement Bolshevism". The Drang nach Osten became a core principle of Nazi Germany expressed through the slogan "Blood and soil" and tied to the belief that the German people were to expand their Lebensraum into eastern Europe, conquering and displacing the native Slavic and Baltic population via Generalplan Ost. The settlement movement became coupled with official policies through the Artaman League.

== Map ==
Locations of utopian communities in Germany, Liechtenstein, Austria and Switzerland. Green: currently active, Black: former

== List ==
| Name | Image | Location | Founder(s) | Founding date | Ending date | Notes |
|---|---|---|---|---|---|---|
| Eden Gemeinnützige Obstbau-Siedlung | Cider works built 1912 | Germany | 18 Lebensreformer with commercial leadership from Bruno Wilhelmi | 1893 | currently active | First vegetarian vegetable cooperative in Germany. It had a population of around 1500 people as of 2008. |
| Frauensiedlung Schwarze Erde | | Germany | Elisabeth Vogler and Marie Buchhold | 1925 | 1951 | Women's cooperative inspired by the Lebensreform movement and reform pedagogy, including agriculture, workshops, a children's sanatorium and gymnastics school. |
| Habertshof | | Germany | Max Zink, Emil Blum | 1919 | 1933 | Religious-socialist commune and school. |
| Bruderhof Communities | Rhon Bruderhof 1935 | Germany | Eberhard and Emmy Arnold | 1920 | 1937 | Religious community inspired by the German Youth Movement and Anabaptism. Had left the country entirely by 1938 due to pressure from the Nazi government. Attempts to reestablish communities in Germany were made in 1955–1961, 1988–1996 and 2002. There is currently one active Bruderhof in Germany and one in Austria. |
| Sinntalhof | Putz Family in front of the Sinntal Hof ca. 1901 | Germany | Bernhard Uffrecht, Ernst Putz, Gertrud and Max Bondy | 1919 or 1920 | 1923 | Temporary site of two schools as part of the pedagogic reform movement and meeting place for groups of the German Youth Movement. It was acquired and used by a Bruderhof Community from 1955 to 1961. |
| Heimland | | Germany | Theodor Fritsch | 1908 | 1922 | Founded as a Cooperative inspired by the Garden City and Völkisch movements. After draft into World War I only four settlers returned alive. Among rising inflation and agricultural difficulties, the community dissolved in 1922. |
| Siedlung Schatzacker | | Switzerland | Werner Zimmermann, Rudolf Müller, Paul Enz | 1932 | 2007 | Vegetable and land reform cooperative inspired by similar communities like Eden and Heimgarten and Silvio Gesell's principles of Freiwirtschaft. |
| Monte Verità | Entrance gate of the Monte Verità sanatorium 1907. | Switzerland | Ida Hofmann, Henri Oedenkoven, Lotte Hattemer and Karl and Gustav Gräser | 1899 or 1900 | 1940 | Vegetarian vegetable cooperative, sanatorium and artist colony frequented by supporters of various alternative movements, utopian-socialists, anarchists, pacifists and artists. An attempt at a revival in the late 1970s met with limited success. |
| Obstbaugenossenschaft Heimgarten | | Switzerland | Julius Sponheimer, Friedrich Fellenberg | 1892 or 1893 | 1905 | Vegetable cooperative founded on the Principles of the Lebensreform movement. Settled especially by Germans who opposed the compulsory vaccination adopted in the German Reich in 1874. |
| Freidorf BL | Playground in Freidorf 1924. | Switzerland | Verband Schweizerischer Konsumvereine, Bernhard Jäggi, Johann Friedrich Schär | 1921 | currently active | Cooperative village inspired by utopian socialism with around 600 inhabitants. Consumer goods and insurance were purchased collectively. A proposed second village was never built. Today it is owned by Coop. |
| Reformsiedlung Eden (Vienna) | | Austria | Various | 1921 | unknown | Anarchist and land reformist cooperative built with help from various alternative communities such as the Theosophical Society and Baptists. |
| Hellerau | Hellerau theatre built 1911. | Germany | Karl Schmidt | 1909 | currently active | First garden city in Germany. |
| Siedlung Hellauf/Vogelhof | | Germany | Friedrich Schöll, Hans Reichert, Otto Mayr | 1921 | 1938 | A vegetable cooperative as part of the völkisch movement. Used as a reform pedagogic boarding school after 1925. After 1945 it became a school again but there was no continuation of persons or ideals. |
| Mittgart Siedlungen | | Germany | Willibald Hentschel | c. 1904 | c. 1914 | Inspired by Willibald Hentschel's utopian novel Mittgart, communities of unknown size were formed somewhere in Lower Saxony with the help of state funding, for the purpose of breeding the German race. They did not last until the First World War. |
| Freilandsiedlung Donnershag/Deutsch-Ordens-Land | | Germany | Margart and Ernst Hunkel | 1919 | 1924 | Funded with state resources, Donnershag had 50 members and up to 350 at its height. Differences in its publishing enterprise led to its demise in 1924. |
| Humanitas commune Höllriegelskreuth | | Germany | Karl Wilhelm Diefenbach | 1885 | 1892 | A small commune formed around the painter and lebensreformer Karl Wilhelm Diefenbach. |
| Humanitas Himmelhof commune | | Germany | Karl Wilhelm Diefenbach, Gustav Gräser | 1897 | 1899 | A commune of up to 24 members, formed around the painter and lebensreformer Karl Wilhelm Diefenbach after the first one in Höllriegelskreuth. It also inspired the Monte Verità commune. |
| Worpswede | | Germany | Mimi Stolte, Fritz Mackensen, and other painters, Heinrich Vogeler | 1889 | currently active | Influential art colony and garden city including a Siedlerschule (school for settlers) and Leberecht Migge's Sonnenhof founded in 1920. After the First World War, Vogeler became increasingly interested in ideological matters, joined the Communist Party, and emigrated to the Soviet Union in 1931. |
| Loheland | A building in Loheland | Germany | Hedwig van Rohden and Louise Langgaard | 1919 | currently active | Founded as a reform school and gymnastics school, today it is an anthroposophic settlement. |
| Freie Erde | | Germany | 25 anarchists, among them Anton Rosinke | 1921 | 1923 | Anarcho-syndicalist commune inspired by the ideas of Gustav Landauer. It was officially recognized and sublet to the squatters by the government in 1922. In 1923 the group split due to differences on matters of polygamy and only one couple remained in the house. |
| Neue Gemeinschaft | | Germany | Brothers Heinrich and Julius Hart and Gustav Landauer | 1900 | 1904 | Anarcho-communist commune. |

== Categorization ==
There has been no clear consensus on the exact assignment of settlements into categories. Ulrich Linse separates the spectrum of settlement attempts into a social reform period and lebensreformische (1900–1914/18), freideutsch-bündische (1918–1923) and bündisch-jugendbewegte (1923-1933) phases. Gustav Küppers categorizes settlements by biological, world-view, political, social, aesthetic and theoretic-pedagogical principles. Gustav Heinecke separates them into völkisch-imperialist and purely religious settlements. Georg Becker names religious and religious-socialist (Habertshof, Bruderhof, Neusonnenfeld, Vogelhof), anti-semitic völkisch (Donnershag), communist (Barkenhof) and anarcho-syndicalist (Freie Erde) communes. Christoph Conti sees religious spirit in all settlements and categorizes them further into political left, right, Christian and women's settlements.

== Interpretation of success ==
Most scholars agree that settlements were short-lived due to economic difficulties, lack of agricultural training and ideological quarrels within groups. However, the ideological success of settlements has been controversial. Bernd Wedemeyer-Kolwe describes four lines of interpretation which roughly follow and build on each other chronologically:

Early scholarship from the 1960s onwards saw reform movements as ersatz religion and compensation of the bourgeois middle class, which was losing political influence between growing capitalist magnates and under pressure from a rising working class. Settlements, then, were a romantic-utopian escapism from mass industrialization into the personal and individual.

Building on this, researchers of the 1970s and 1980s increasingly saw aspects of socio-political protest incorporated into the allegedly private reform movements. This bourgeois-anti-bourgeois paradox was extensively examined in scholarship from then on and was later seen as an essential character of modernism, because "modernity stands in its essence continually in opposition to itself".

Finally, a majority of contemporary scholars now view the reform movements not as escape from or protest against modernity, but instead its very forerunners. Wedemeyer-Kolwe points out that this also adequately reflects the self-perception of those involved in the 19th century reform movements, who thought themselves "rational, modern and progressive".

According to another fringe interpretation presented by Barlösius and Wedemeyer-Kolwe, the reform movements allowed members of a newly developing middle class to assimilate themselves into and absorb the former bourgeois lifestyle and values, which became the new mainstream in the early 20th century. Eisenberg also observed this in the history of association football.

There has been no updated overview on the settlement aspect of German 19th century reform movements in particular since the handbook of 1998. Furthermore, "interpretations of the historic phenomenon in its global context are still missing".

== Influence ==
In the 1960s, there was a resurgence of intentional communities, beginning with Kommune 1 in Berlin. Seemingly unaware of the previous movement, researchers then became interested in historic predecessors. Communities continue to be ideologically varied. Thus, in the 1990s, the approaching new millennium brought another wave of interest in sustainability due to widespread fears of ecological collapse. There is a network of contemporary left-political communes in Germany called "Kommuja" with about 40 member groups (May 2023). Similarly, there are contemporary settlements on the political right, with a focus on organic agriculture, nationalism and eugenics, also influenced by Anastasianism. In an interview, Elisabeth Siebert estimated that there are at least 17 such settlements in Mecklenburg-Vorpommern.

== See also ==
- List of intentional communities § Germany
- List of Finnish utopian communities
- List of American utopian communities
- Global Ecovillage Network
- Intentional Community
- German Youth Movement
- Garden City Movement
- Lebensreform
- Back-to-the-land movement
- Tolstoyan movement
- Land reform in Germany
- Ecovillage
- Agrarianism
- Homesteading
