= Karl Wilhelm Diefenbach =

German painter

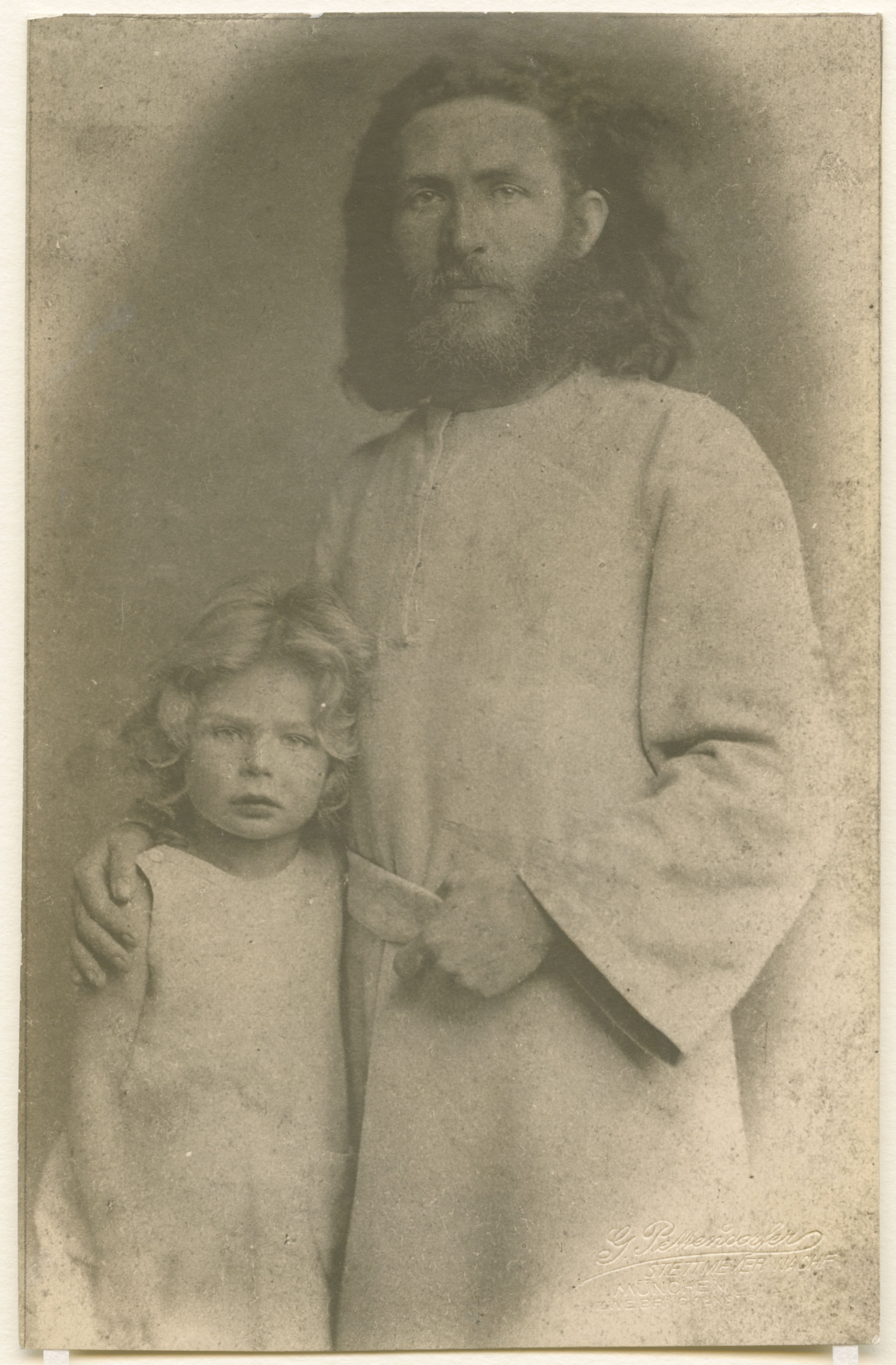
- Diefenbach around 1885 with his son Helios (born 1880), taken by German photographer Georg Pettendorfer
- Born: 21 February 1851; Hadamar, Duchy of Nassau
- Died: 15 December 1913 (aged 62); Capri, Province of Naples, Kingdom of Italy
- Occupations: Artist and social reformer
- Known for: Reform movement
- Movement: Lebensreform (life-reform), Freikörperkultur (FKK, naturism) and peace movement

Karl Wilhelm Diefenbach (21 February 1851 – 15 December 1913) was a German painter and social reformer. Regarded as the "forefather of alternative movements", he championed Lebensreform (lit. 'life-reform'), Freikörperkultur (a kind of naturism), and pacifism. His rural commune Himmelhof (in Ober Sankt Veit near Vienna, 1897–1899) inspired his student Gustav Gräser to found the Monte Verità settlement (near Ascona). As a painter, Diefenbach worked within Symbolism.

== Life ==
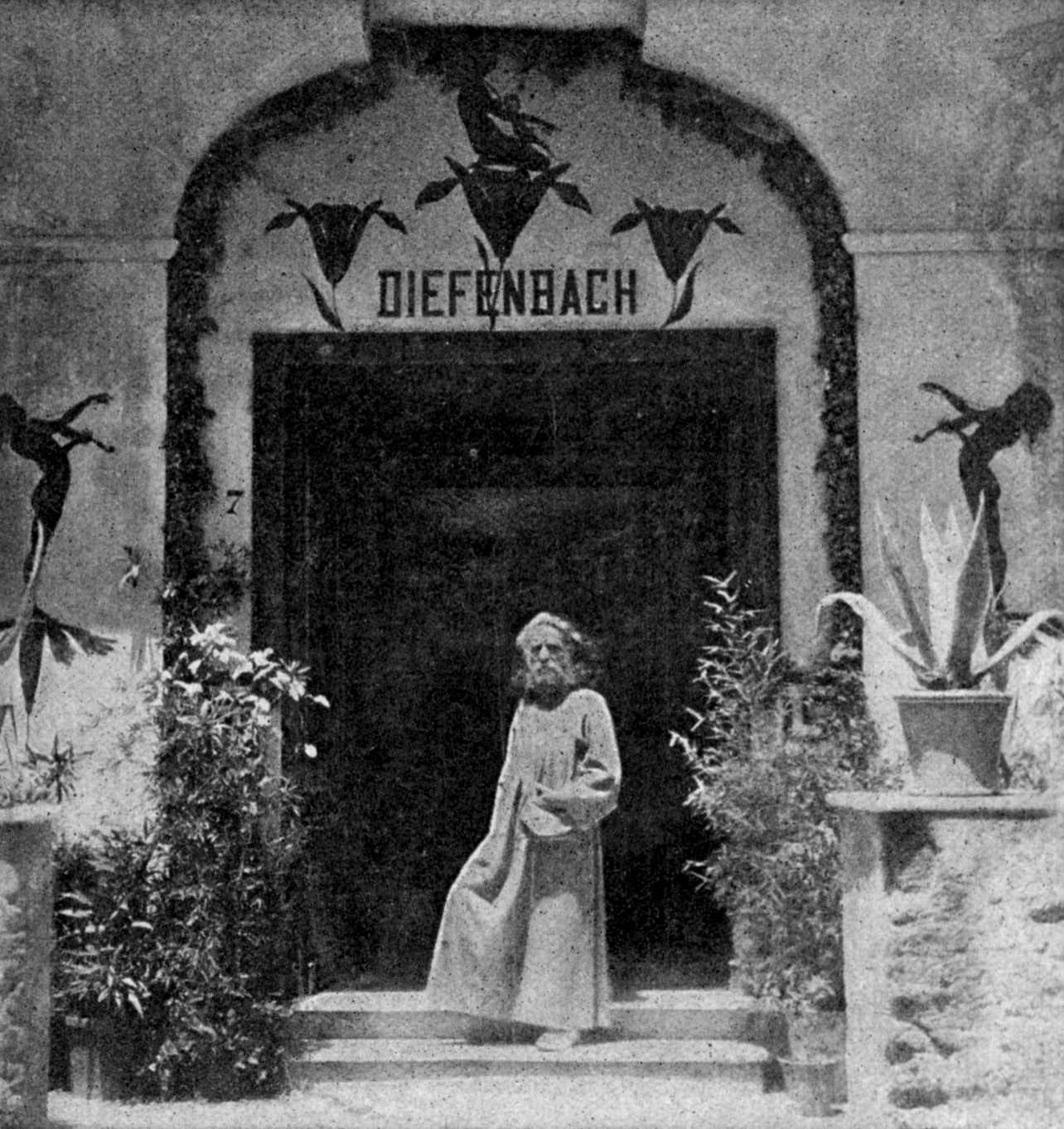
Diefenbach in front of his house in Capri. Photo date before 1913

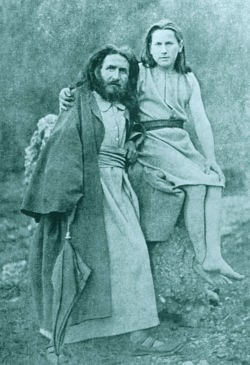
Diefenbach and Hugo Höppener (Fidus), at Höllriegelskreuth near Munich, in 1887

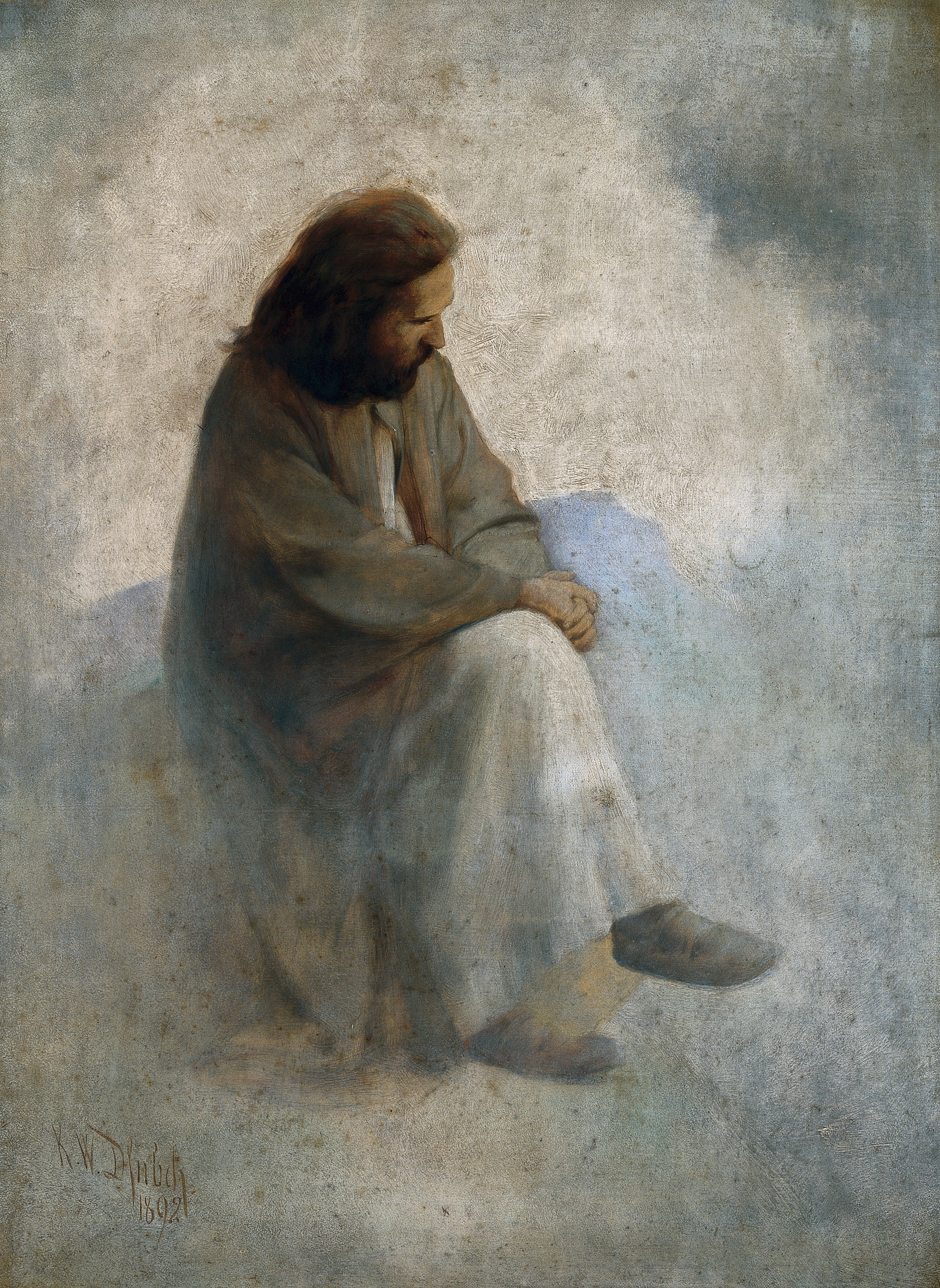
Self portrait as Christ,1892

Born in Hadamar in Hesse, then part of the Duchy of Nassau, Diefenbach was the son of Leonhard Diefenbach, a painter and drawing teacher at Hadamarer Gymnasium. Diefenbach attended this Gymnasium and received his first artistic lessons from his father. He then studied at the Munich Academy of Fine Arts and was impressed by Arnold Böcklin and Franz von Stuck.

Diefenbach received attention and recognition early on, but his endeavours were temporarily cut short; his right arm was crippled as a result of severe typhoid fever and a botched operation. He had to learn all activities, which included writing and painting, with his left hand. Since he believed that he had saved his life with naturopathic methods, he transformed himself into the apostle of the natural way of life under the influence of the naturopathic practitioner Arnold Rikli and Eduard Baltzer, the founder of the Vegetarian Association in Germany and president of the Association of German Free Religious Communities.

After a long break, Diefenbach returned to his art studies, and after a few months, broke off his study again to earn his living as a freelance artist. At this point, Diefenbach was twenty-five years old and earned well with illustrations for children's books and watercolour copies. Having only had seven months at the art academy, Diefenbach was familiar with almost all painting techniques, especially portrait, model drawing, and silhouette painting. Diefenbach's talent and skill were rewarded with recognition and increasing popularity, and interested visitors flocked to his exhibitions.

=== Marriage and first revelation to prophetic reformer ===
In 1880, Diefenbach lived together with Maximiliane "Maja" Schlotthauer and Magdalena Atzinger. Magdalena gave birth to his son Helios – the sun – in 1880. Diefenbach resigned from the institutional Church around 1881 and became a member of the Freireligiöse Bewegung (Free Religious Movement). In 1882, Diefenbach married Magdalena, but only for the sole reason that unmarried mothers with their children were viewed with askance in society. Immediately after the wedding, Diefenbach withdrew to Hohenpeißenberg in the Bavarian Alpine Foreland, where his first revelation allegedly happened to him on 10 February 1882 during the sunrise: his transformation and calling to become a prophetic reformer.

After Diefenbach's revelation, wearing nothing more than a long wool habit and sandals, he announced in Munich his own teaching. His ideas—a cobbled-together worldview of living in harmony with nature, rejecting monogamy, turning away from any institutional religion, exercising in the fresh air, and practicing Freikörperkultur (naturism), as well as a meat-free diet as a vegan, as the basis of a healthy and orderly lifestyle—were taken as an opportunity by his contemporaries to mock and pursue him, calling him a "kohlrabi apostle." He stoically endured this, as his diet consisted of tomatoes, cucumbers, bread, and of course, kohlrabi.

Diefenbach flouted social conventions: Marriage was considered a "compulsory institute," "degrading and shameful," a "legitimate form of fornication." The church a "Satan institute." The "clothing epidemic" he described as a "monkey masquerade" that makes the body sick, which is why he often walked barefoot through Munich in his habit.

Diefenbach expressed his ideals in more than a hundred paintings and propagated them in public lectures in Munich, which he was soon forbidden to do. The police kept an eye on Diefenbach, often raiding his lectures. Even when he was silent, he caused a sensation in his white costume and wrote in his diary in 1885 after a visit to the theatre: "Everywhere the masses gather. Foolish, immature people."

The Austrian writer Peter Rosegger, Hermann Hesse, and later even fellow painter Egon Schiele admired Diefenbach. In 1894, Rosegger wrote in "An eccentric and his works": "... That, what others speak and teach – he lives it. "Natural living" in food, clothing, dwelling, in everything – that is his case; He walked around the city of Munich barefoot in shirt-like robes, he let his children run around naked in his secluded corner of the country."

Diefenbach's legitimate wife bore him two more children: Stella, the star, in 1882, and Lucidus, the shining one, in 1886. The marriage was a martyrdom for both partners, but Magdalena died in 1890, and Diefenbach saw himself relieved of a burden, saving him from filing for divorce.

=== Höllriegelskreuth commune ===
In 1885, after the authorities had suppressed Diefenbach's public lectures, he withdrew from the conservative Munich to an abandoned quarry near Höllriegelskreuth in the Bavarian countryside. Here, he formed a small artists' commune called "Humanitas" that lived according to the teachings of Eduard Baltzer, Diefenbach's idol. But even here, Diefenbach was never able to shake off the pressures of the state. The authorities observed suspiciously that the offspring played naked in the garden and that Diefenbach gave his third child only a vegetarian diet, not even dairy milk. In addition, the painter was permanently in financial difficulties. The artistic breakthrough did not materialize: the public and the press were hardly interested in his paintings, only in his curious life.

In the Höllriegelskreuth "Humanitas" commune, the young academic painter from Lübeck, Hugo Höppener, became Diefenbach's disciple and assistant. Diefenbach called him Fidus, which became Höppener's pseudonym. The German magazine Die Schönheit (The Beauty) from 1901 published works by Fidus, who became an icon of the Freikörperkultur (naturism) movement.

In 1892, Diefenbach and his children were in Vienna, whilst his former student Fidus (Hugo Höppener) was house manager and fending off Diefenbach's creditors. In any case, he could not put off Diefenbach's creditors in the long run; they insisted on foreclosure, and Diefenbach was only able to save his property with partial or installment payments at the last minute.

=== The Vienna art exhibition, fame and disaster ===
In the same year, Diefenbach attempted a liberation—and experienced a disaster. Diefenbach's works had garnered the attention of Moritz Terke, director of the near-bankrupt Austrian Art Association (Österreichischen Kunstvereins). The unscrupulous Terke invited Diefenbach to mount a large exhibition of his paintings in Vienna in the spring of 1892. Diefenbach's exhibition for the Austrian Art Association was a sensational success and made him famous. The exhibition was so popular, attracting crowds of visitors, that it remained on view until November, by which time at least 78,000 people had seen it. But in the end, Diefenbach was completely penniless because the heavily indebted association embezzled funds from a loan that was insured with Diefenbach's works.

Before the exhibition, Diefenbach had commissioned his former student Fidus (Hugo Höppener) to complete the larger version of the silhouette Per aspera ad astra or music children and send it to him in Vienna. Diefenbach wrote in his book: "Precisely this work, the most complete and comprehensive of all that has become possible for me to date, could not be missing from the exhibition of my artistic work in Vienna." Diefenbach's colossal 68-metre long silhouette wall frieze artwork "Per aspera ad astra" or "Music Children" was completed in 1892 and consisted of 43 panels. He hoped to exhibit it in Vienna, but the director of the Austrian Art Association (Österreichischen Kunstvereins), Moritz Terke, didn't even want to see the creation, considering it to be "childish stuff", let alone exhibit it. Diefenbach showed the Terke family sketches for the work and explained the history of its origins, hoping it would be included in his exhibition in Vienna, certainly highly suitable for a Christmas exhibition and its spatial extent (68 metres).

The silhouette became a particularly huge success in Germany, where it was also printed on folders and postcards. The exhibit did not come about until 1893 in Baden and, despite the great surge of celebrities at the opening, was a total failure financially, and new debts drove Diefenbach into homelessness. Today, this colossal artwork is exhibited in the town museum of Diefenbach's birthplace.

=== Egypt tour, Vienna honorary association ===
After Diefenbach's negative experience with the Austrian Art Association, he left Vienna in 1895 for two years. He travelled with his disciples across the alps before touring towards Egypt, where, in the land of the Pharaohs, Diefenbach designed and sketched ambitious plans for huge temples. He then travelled back to Vienna in 1897 to reclaim his lost works and planned to publish a magazine called "Humanitas".

In Vienna, a circle of friends who valued Diefenbach's work actively supported him. This circle included the pacifist and later Nobel laureate Bertha von Suttner, whom Diefenbach met for the first time at a peace congress in Vienna in 1891, and the publicist Michael Georg Conrad. An honorary association was founded to celebrate Diefenbach "as a tremendous pioneer of a higher cultural epoch", and an exhibition was planned to travel through Europe to finally help the man from Hadamar to fame.

=== Himmelhof commune ===
In 1897, Diefenbach founded a new artists' "Humanitas" commune in the former guesthouse "Auf dem Himmeln" on Himmelhof in Ober Sankt Veit (Vienna), which became the nucleus of the early alternative movement or Lebensreform (life-reform). At times, it included the artists František Kupka, Konstantinos Parthenis, Paul von Spaun and Gustav Gräser, as well as the later animal rights activist Magnus Schwantje. From 1897 to 1899, up to 24 members lived together on the Himmelhof. It was a forerunner for the famous alternative settlement Monte Verità near Ascona in Switzerland, co-founded by Gustav Gräser. Vegetarian diet, naturism, and reform clothing were among the rules of this commune. Gustav Gräser summarized the philosophy as follows: "We are striving for the paradise of the earth. (...) We have recognized and banned the inhuman brutality and degeneracy of today's society."

The Himmelhof was by no means a flaky community of dropouts. Diefenbach saw himself as a divine educator and led his disciples with a heavy hand. One member stated: "All of us together form a Diefenbach family that is guided in the spirit of the master, which has the master as its leader and teacher and who, trusting in his leadership in anything and everything, has to obey him unconditionally." Solo walks into the city were forbidden, letters were censored, and everyone had to present the "master" with diary entries about their activities. Intimate relationships within the commune were taboo—except for Diefenbach himself, who gave himself to changing mistresses.

Diefenbach's authoritarian style could not prevent unrest; there were quarrels and love dramas, most of which revolved around his daughter Stella (married von Spaun) (1882–1971). The local press accused the loathsome community of "immoral" activities, insulted them as "freeloaders", and Diefenbach as "master of idleness".

In 1898, Diefenbach met Wilhelmine (Mina) Vogler, whom he married, but primarily lived with her sister Marie (Hilaris) Orborny, in a kind of marriage of three. Both women had a history of suicide attempts and ended up often in psychiatry. Orborny was a severe alcoholic and for Diefenbach a test candidate. In fact, she did abstain from alcohol, and Diefenbach could present her as a living example of his promising theory of salvation. But there was a constant crisis in their love triangle; both women were jealous of each other and fought often. Wilhelmine lasted four months before she ended up in psychiatry again.

=== Capri commune ===
Almost two years and one exhibition disaster later, the search for paradise on earth was over. Diefenbach, once again broke, had to leave the Himmelhof with his disciples, and his works were foreclosed on. He travelled in 1899 to Trieste, wanted to go on to the Orient, but then settled on the artists' island of Capri, in the Villa Giulia in Anacapri. Diefenbach continued to paint, especially landscapes, received visitors like the art journalist Emil Szittya, and hoped to the end for a breakthrough.

In vain, on 15 December 1913, he died of an intestinal obstruction (Ileus). A companion noted: "Yes, what have we lost! And if our friend had at least gone, like a beautiful sunset; but alas, his death was, like his life, a storm: with sudden, tremendous pain." Diefenbach died as one who was repeatedly thwarted and was quickly forgotten. Many of Diefenbach's works can still be seen in a museum in the monastery Certosa di San Giacomo on Capri, and some of his ideas, above all vegetarianism, are probably closer to us today than to his fellow human beings back then.

The largest collection of the work of Karl Wilhelm Diefenbach in the United States is held by The Jack Daulton Collection in Los Altos Hills, California.

== Gallery of selected works ==
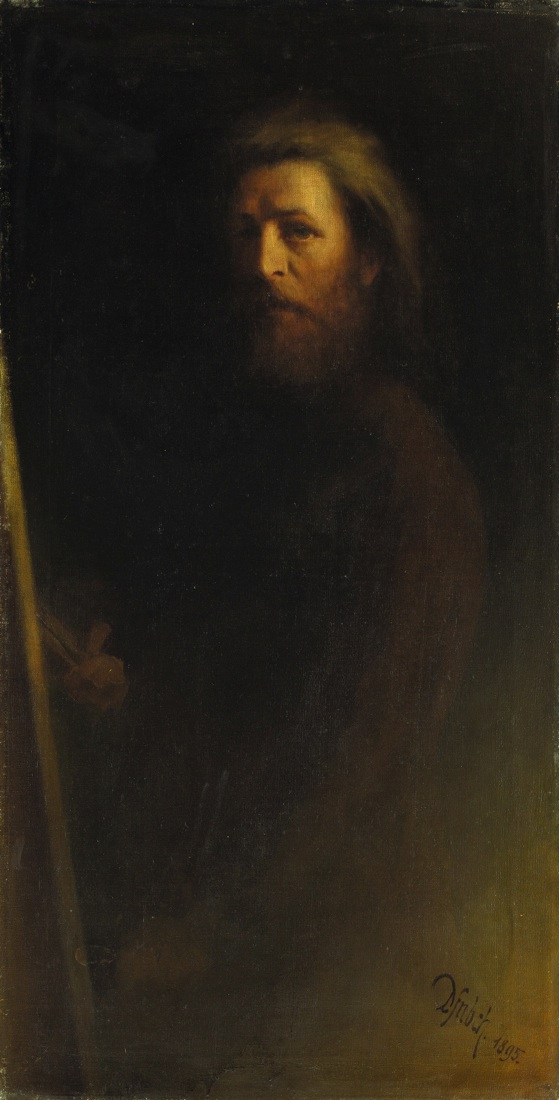
Self Portrait, 1895, oil on canvas, 119 × 60,5 cm, Jack Daulton Collection, Los Altos Hills, California

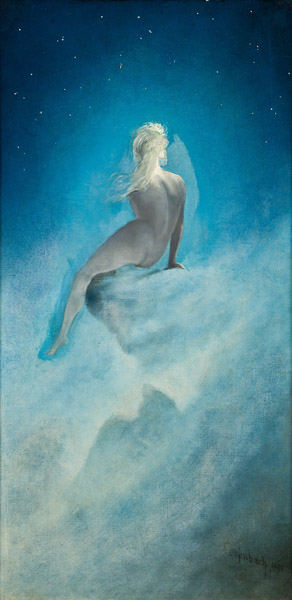
Frage an die Sterne (Asking the Stars), 1898, another version was created in 1901, Diefenbach's daughter Stella was the model for this painting from her photographic studio pose

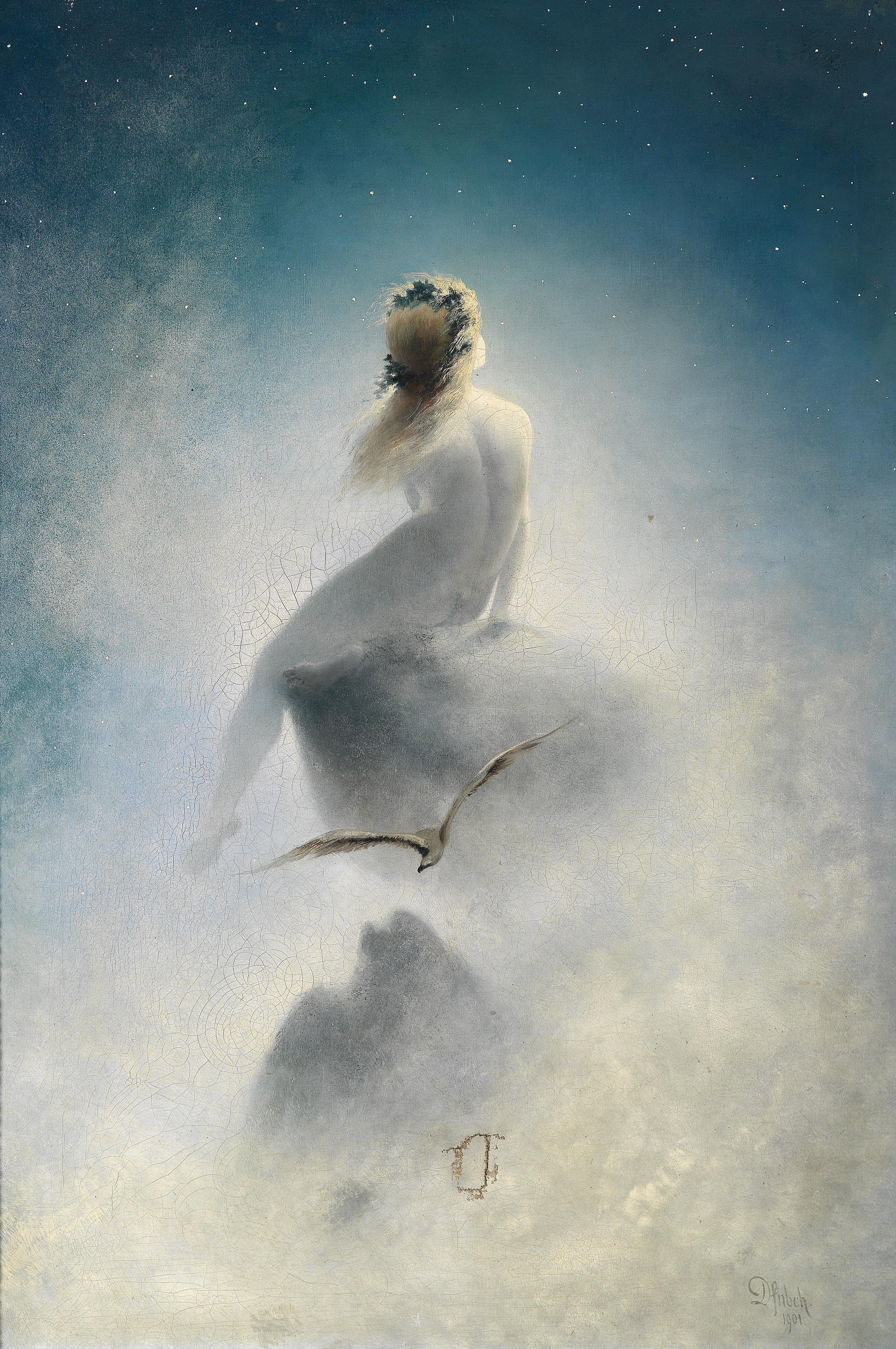
Frage an die Sterne (Asking the Stars), 1901

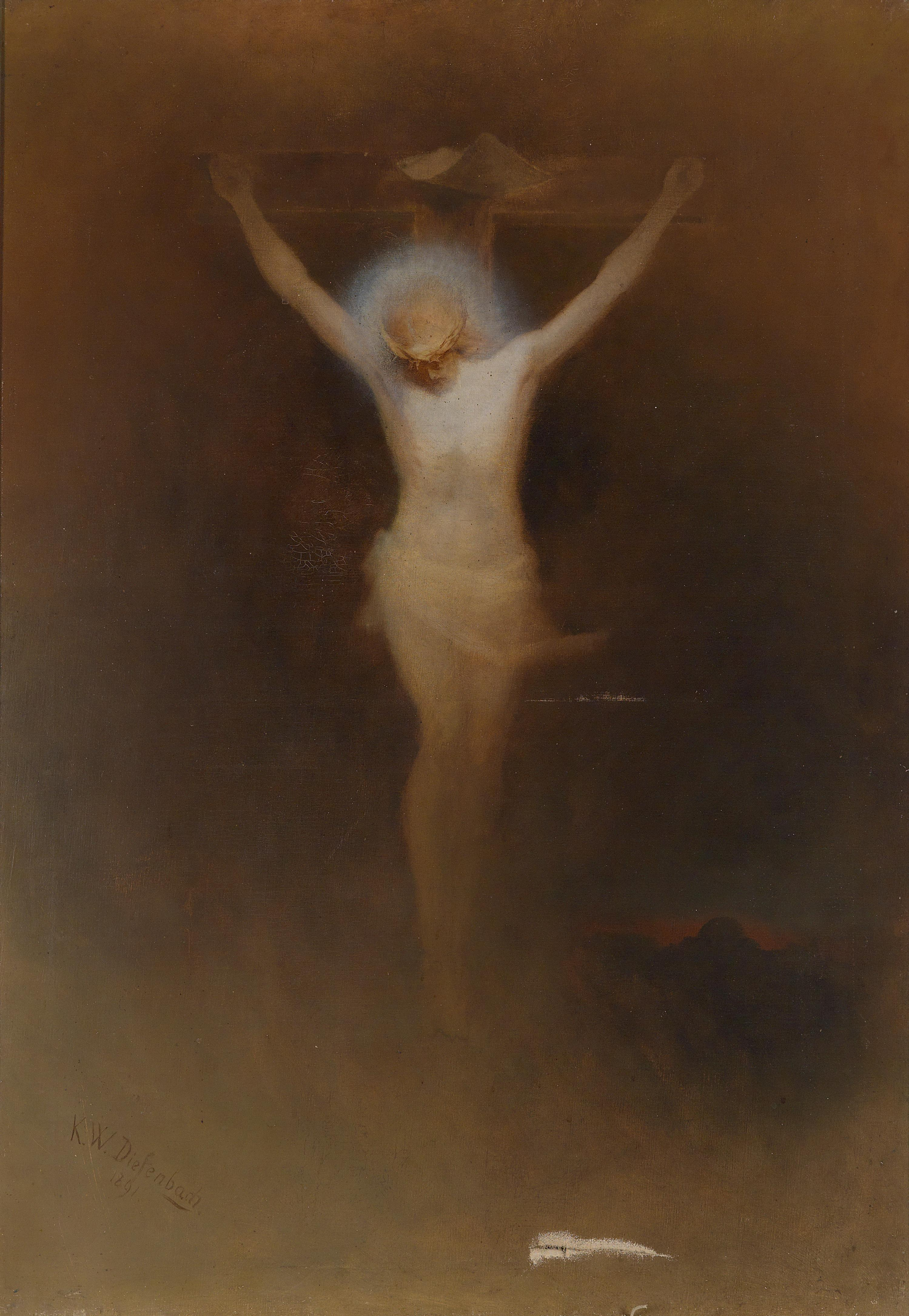
Karl Wilhelm Diefenbach Christus am Kreuz (Christ on the Cross), 1891, oil on canvs, 112,5 x 78,5 cm, The Jack Daulton Collection, Los Altos Hills, California

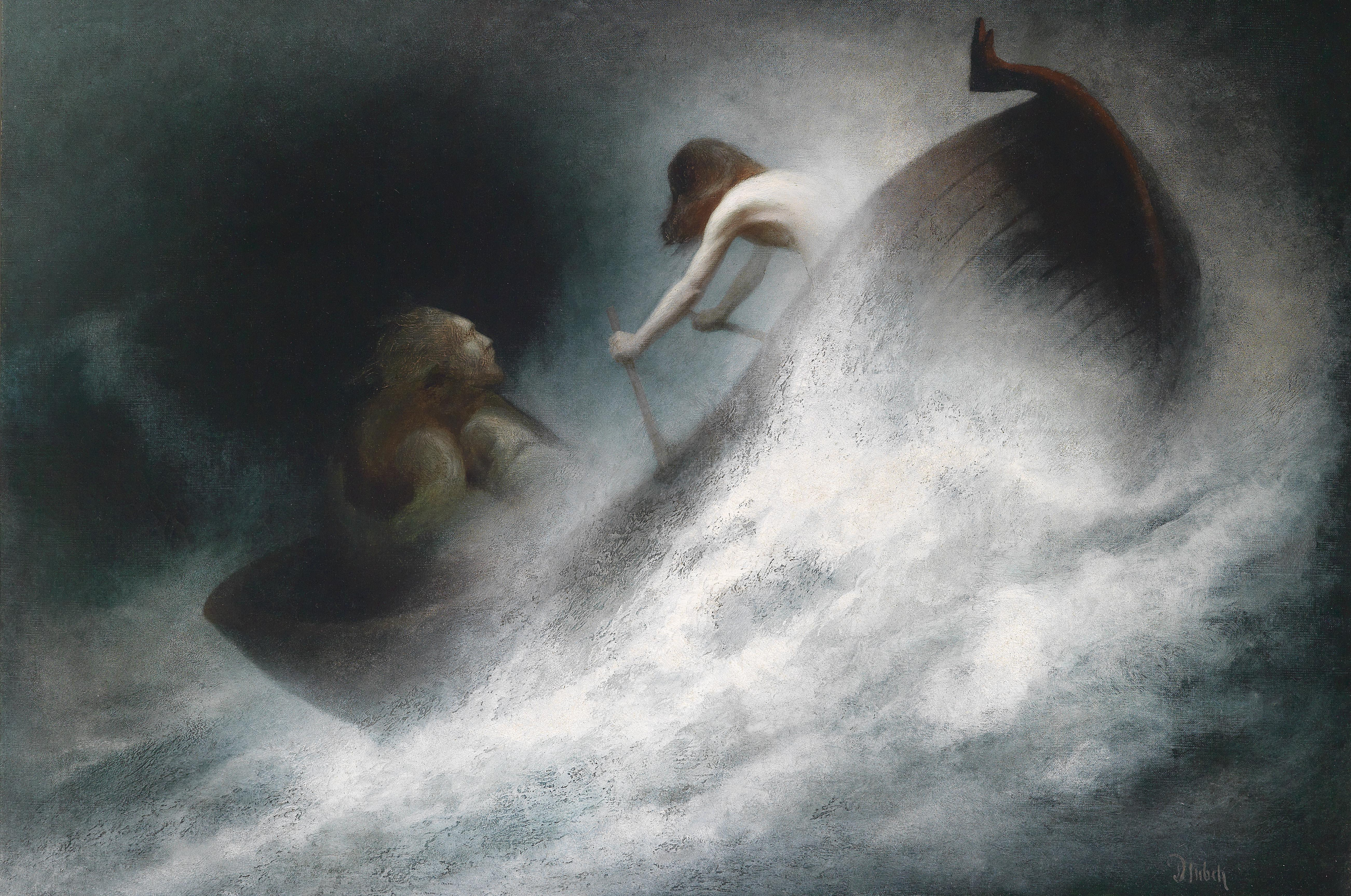
Der Rettung entgegen (Towards Rescue) ca. 1900, oil on canvas, 100 × 151 cm, Jack Daulton Collection, Los Altos Hills, California

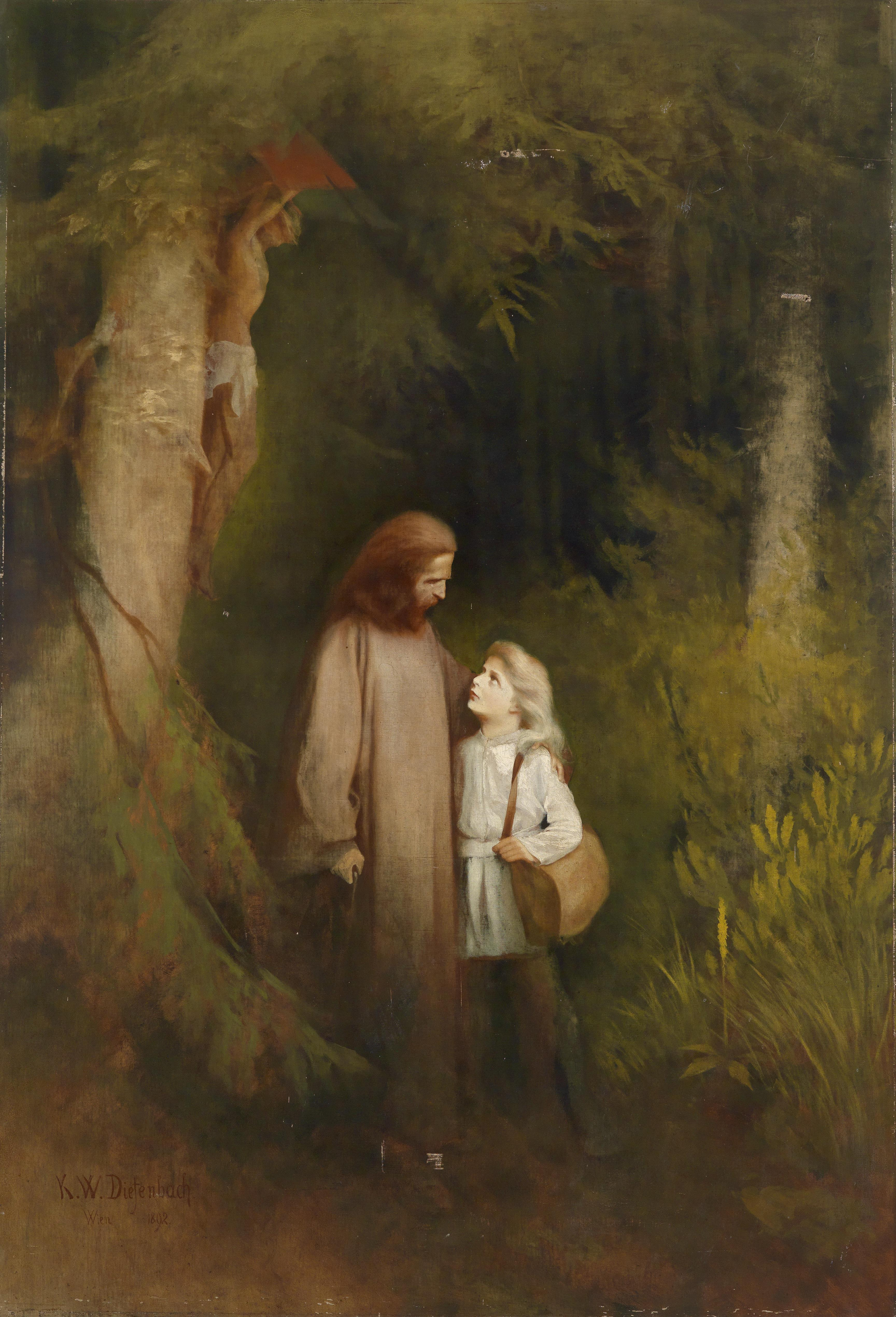
Abschied (Farewell), oil on canvas, 223 x 152 cm, Vienna 1892

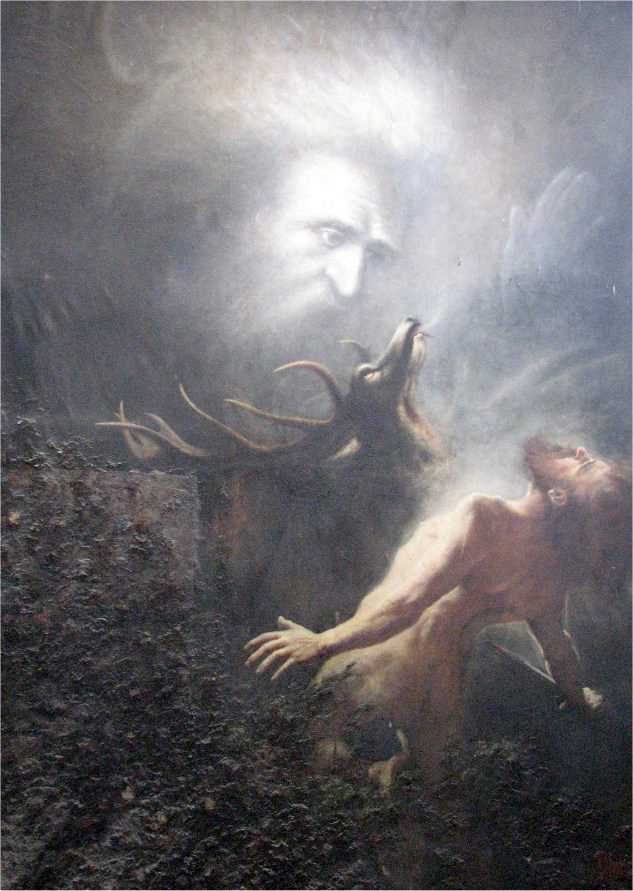
Du sollst nicht töten (You Shall Not Kill), 1903

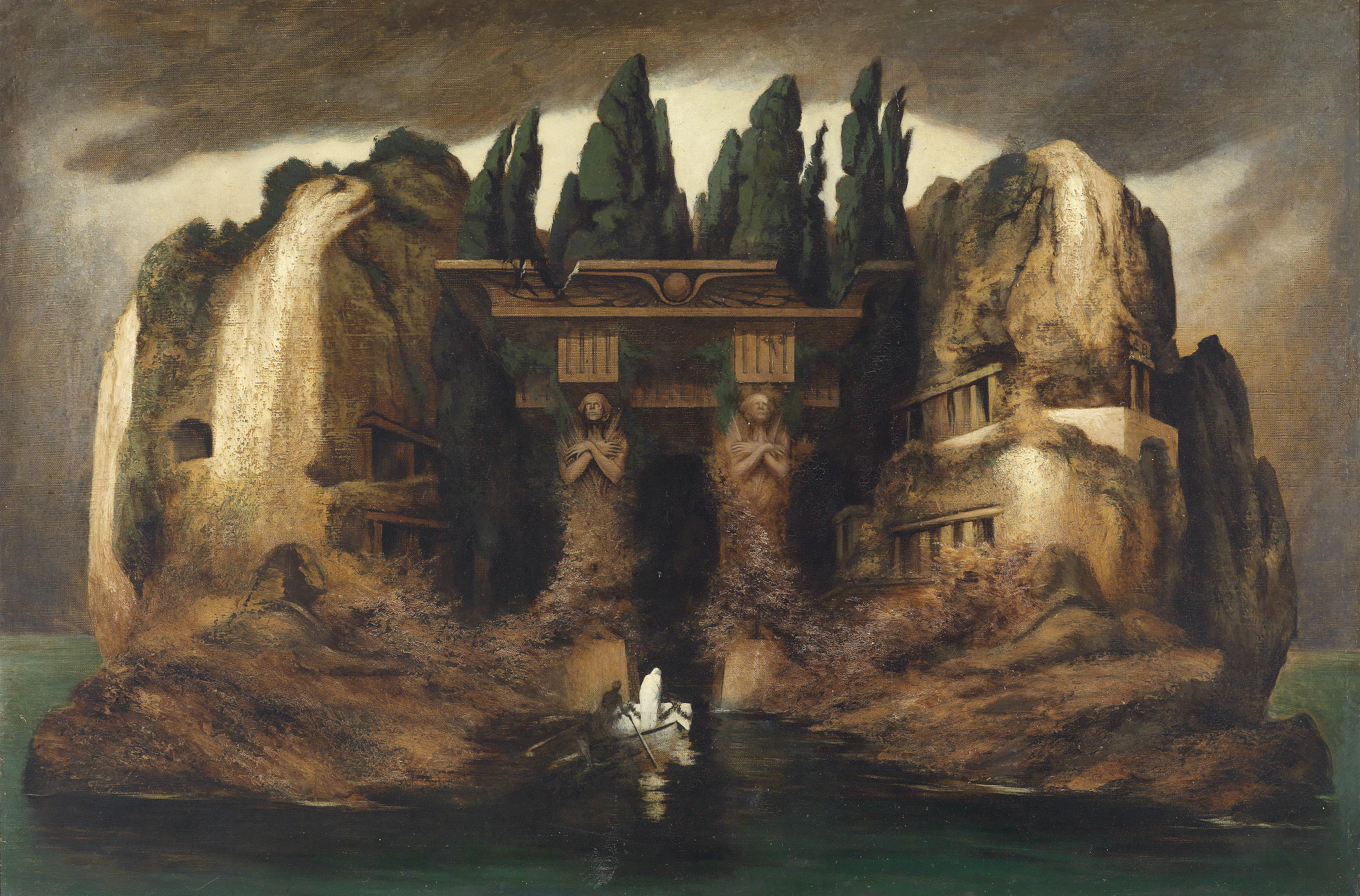
Toteninsel (Dead Island), homage by Diefenbach to Arnold Böcklin, ca. 1905. On the building on the right is the monogram AB as a sign of this homage

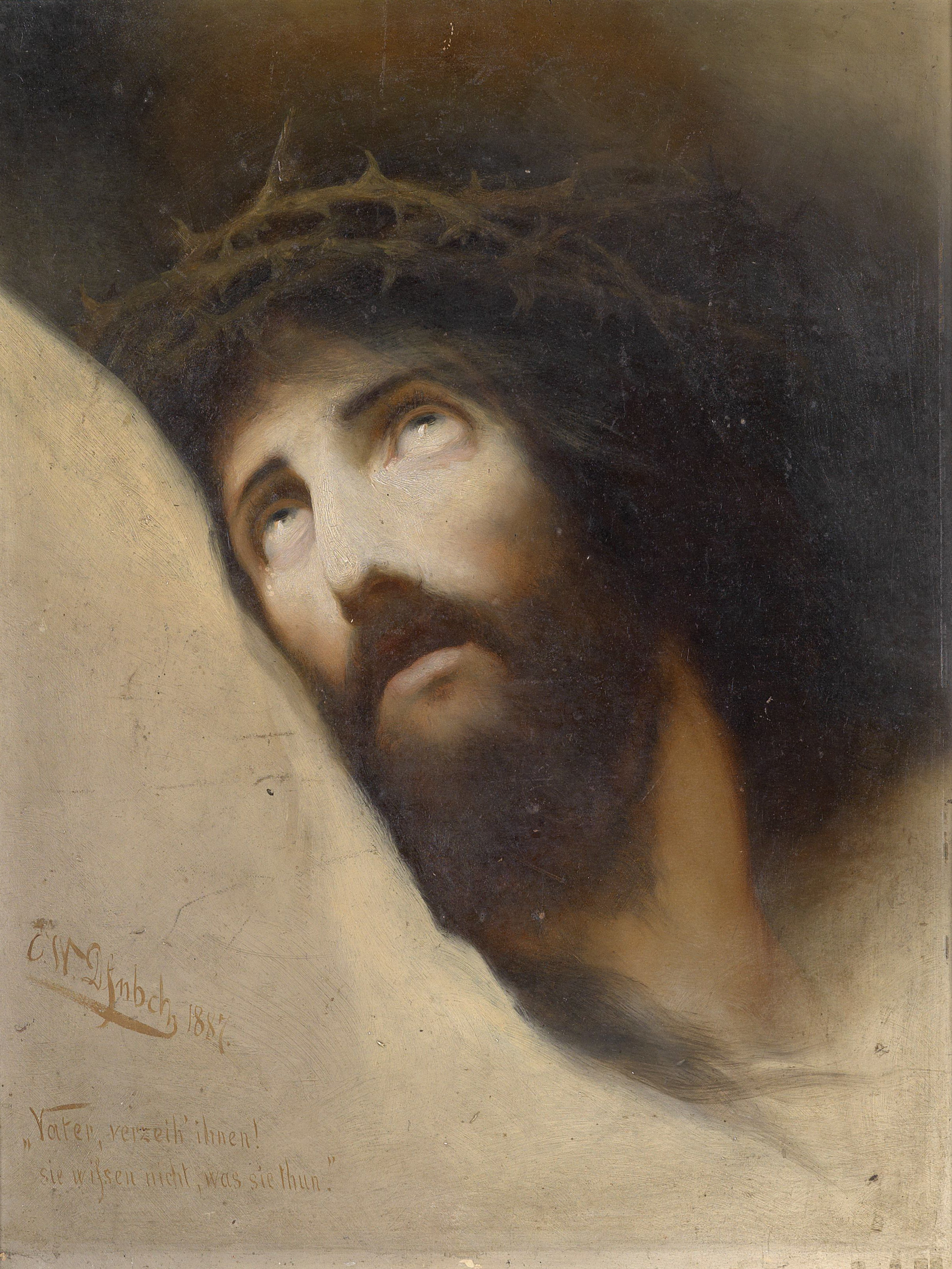
Vater verzeih Ihnen (Father, forgive them!, For they know not what they do), 1887

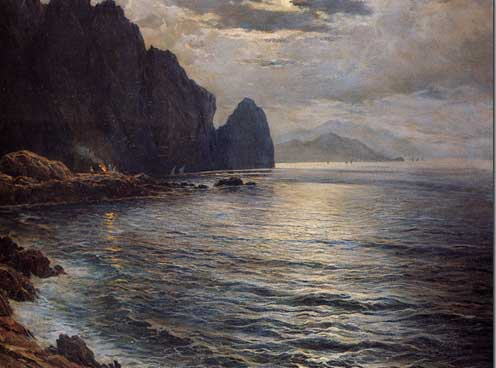
Il Tramonto (The Sundown)", before 1913

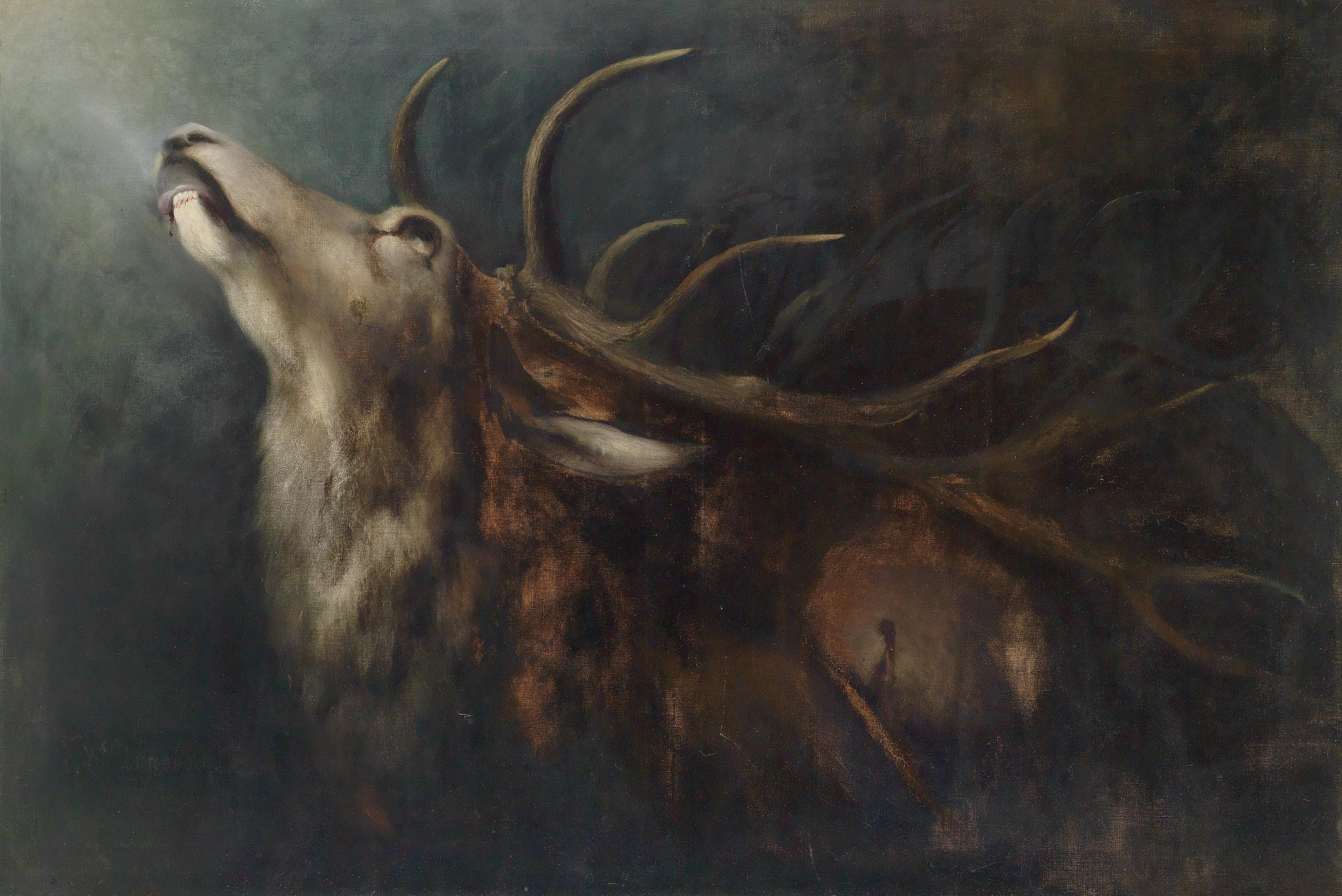
Sterbender Hirsch (Dying Deer), oil on canvas, 98.5 x 150 cm, before 1913

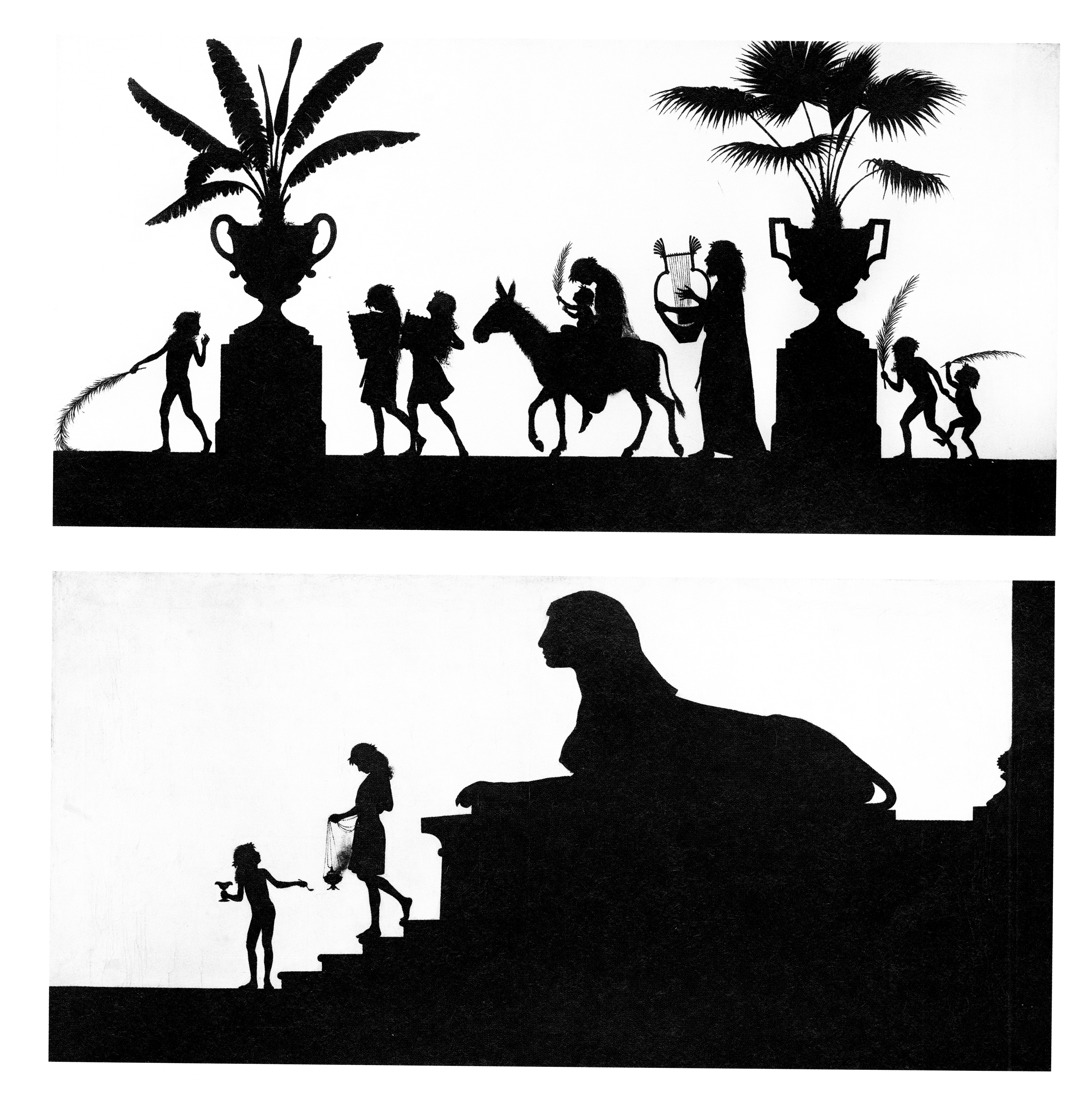
Selected silhouette wall frieze illustration, from Diefenbach's Per aspera ad astra or music children, 1892

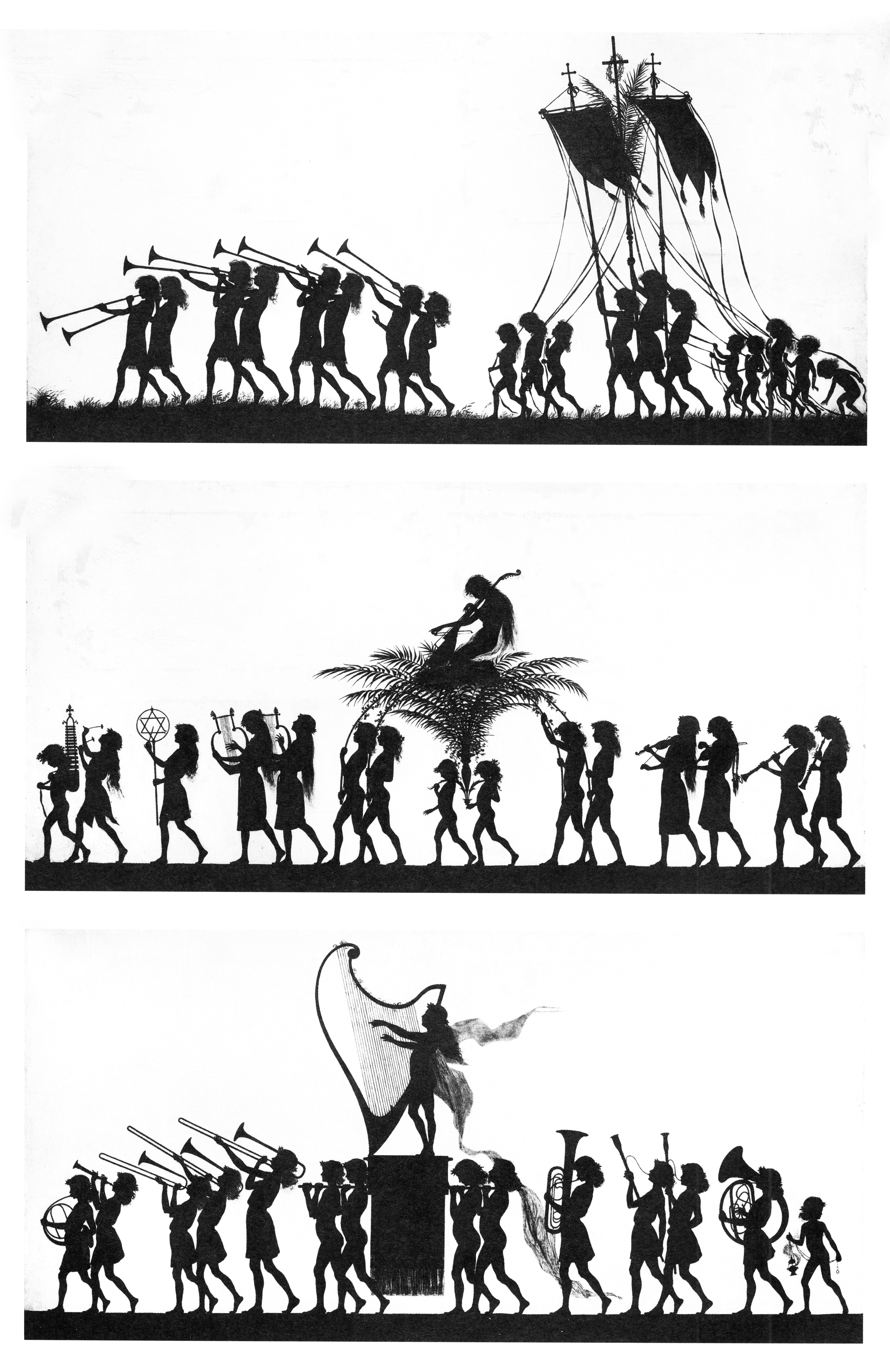
Selected silhouette wall frieze illustration, from Diefenbach's Per aspera ad astra or music children, 1892

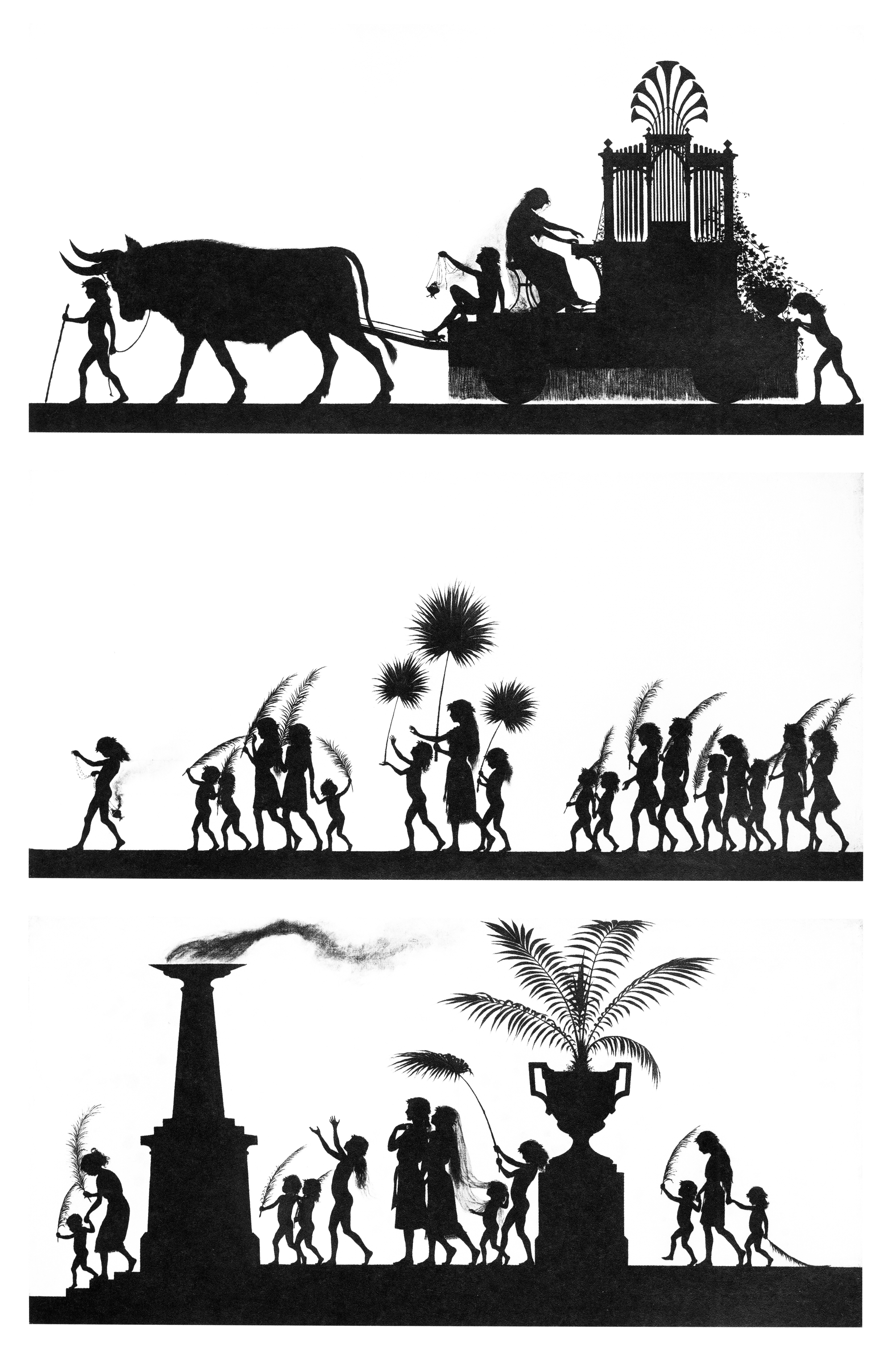
Selected silhouette wall frieze illustration, from Diefenbach's Per aspera ad astra or music children, 1892

== Selected works published ==
- Eine Beitrag zur Geschichte der zeitgenössischen Kunstpflege (A contribution to the history of contemporary art cultivation), Vienna 1895

== See also ==
- Lebensreform

== Bibliography ==
- Zäuner, Günther (2018). "Der Kohlrabi-Apostel und seine Jünger (1899)". Halbseidenes kaiserliches Wien: 12 Krimis aus dem Fin de Siècle [Semi-silk imperial Vienna: 12 thrillers from the end of the century] (in German). Marchtrenk: Verlag federfrei. ISBN 9783990740163.

== Sources ==
- Alisio, Giancarlo: Karl Wilhelm Diefenbach 1851-1913. Dipinti da collezioni private. Electa Napoli. Edizioni La Conchiglia,1995.
- Allgemeines Künstlerlexikon Bd. 27, 2000, S. 221.
- Buchholz, Kai u. a. (Hrsg.): Die Lebensreform. Entwürfe zur Neugestaltung von Leben und Kunst um 1900. 2 Bände. Verlag Haeusser, Darmstadt 2001. ISBN 3-89552-077-2
- Karl Wilhelm Diefenbach. Per aspera ad astra: Schattenfries und Dichtung "Seines Lebens Traum & Bild" Anmerkungen von Claudia Wagner. Recklinghausen, Umbruch-Verlag, 2. Auflage, 2007. Broschur, 75 S. mit Abb. ISBN 978-3-937726-01-4
- Eley, Geoff; Retallack, James, eds. (2003). Wilhelminism and Its Legacies: German Modernities, Imperialism, and the Meanings of Reform, 1890-1930. Berghahn Books. p. 95. ISBN 978-0-85745-711-0.<
- Frecot, Janos; Geist, Johann Friedrich; Kerbs, Diethart: Fidus, 1868-1948. Zur ästhetischen Praxis bürgerlicher Fluchtbewegungen. München: Rogner und Bernhard bei Zweitausendeins; Affoltern: Buch 2000. ISBN 3-8077-0359-4
- Grisko, Michael (Hrsg.): Freikörperkultur und Lebenswelt. Studien zur Vor- und Frühgeschichte der Freikörperkultur. kassel university press, Kassel 1999. ISBN 3-933146-06-2
- Hammer, Claudia: Karl Wilhelm Diefenbach, 1851-1913. Ausstellungskatalog der Galerie Konrad Bayer, München 2003.
- Kobel, Stefan: Karl Wilhelm Diefenbach. Der Maler als Gesamtkunstwerk. Magisterarbeit, Düsseldorf 1997.
- Müller, Hermann (Hrsg.): Meister Diefenbachs Alpenwanderung. Ein Künstler und Kulturrebell im Karwendel 1895/1896. Umbruch-Verlag, Recklinghausen 2004. ISBN 3-937726-00-4
- Richter, Peter: Der Jesus von München, Frankfurter Allgemeine Sonntagszeitung vom 29. November 2009, S. 23
- Schiano, Manuela: Alla ricerca della Sonnenland: la missione di Karl Wilhelm Diefenbach, «Heliopolis»,1, settembre- dicembre 2002, pp. 89–103.
- Schiano, Manuela: Conoscere K.W.Diefenbach, «Conoscere Capri», 7, 2008.
- Schiano, Manuela: K.W.Diefenbach. Un artista senza patria, Tesi di laurea in storia moderna, Università degli studi di Napoli "Federico II", Napoli 2001.
- Schiano, Manuela: Una stanza chiamata museo, «Nuova Museologia», 7, dicembre 2002, pp. 23–26.
- Spaun, Paul von (Hrsg.): Zum Fall Diefenbach. Triest 1899.
- Todisco, Silvana: K. W. Diefenbach. Omnia vincit ars. Electa Napoli, Neapel 1988.
- Wagner, Claudia (2007). Der Künstler Karl Wilhelm Diefenbach (1851-1913) - Meister und Mission. Mit einem Werkkatalog aller bekannten Ölgemälde [The artist Karl Wilhelm Diefenbach (1851 – 1913)] (Masters) (in German). Berlin: Freien Universität.
- Wagner, Claudia; Müller, Herrmann; Smolik, Noemi; Schuster, Marina (2011). 'Karl Wilhelm Diefenbach (1851–1913): Lieber sterben, als meine Ideale verleugnen! (in German) (2nd ed.). München: Minerva. ISBN 978-3938832769.
