= Emil Szittya =

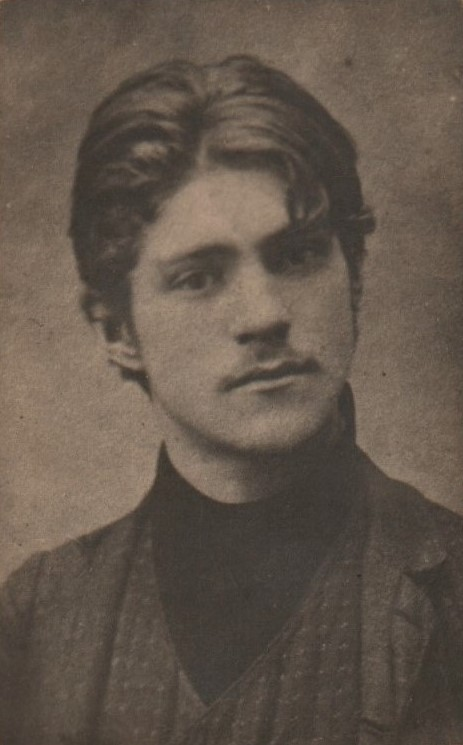
- Emil Szittya in 1906
- Born: Adolf/Avraham Schenk; 18 August 1886; Budapest, Hungary Austria-Hungary
- Died: 26 November 1964 (aged 78); Paris, France
- Occupations: Novelist; Journalist "Vagabond"
- Spouse: Erika Drägert
- Children: Jeanne
- Parent(s): Ignác Schenk; Regina Spatz

Emil Szittya is the name under which the originally Austria-Hungarian multi-faceted libertarian writer Adolf/Avraham Schenk (18 August 1886 – 26 November 1964) published his first book, and it is the name by which he was and is most frequently known. The very many pseudonyms under which he may sometimes be identified include "Chronist, Emszi" and "Emil Lesitt". Along with his work as a novelist and journalist, he is also sometimes classified as an art critic and/or an inveterate traveller-vagabond. His earlier work was written in Hungarian. Later, as a young man, he also wrote in German. During the second half of his life he lived principally in France and wrote in French.

== Life ==
Adolf Schenk was born in Óbuda (part of Budapest), a member of the Hungarian speaking Jewish community in what was at that time an ethnically diverse city. Ignác Schenk, his father, was a shoe-maker while his mother, born Regina Spatz stayed at home and looked after the children. According to the available information he was the eldest of his parents' five sons. Little is known of his early years. He himself would later come up with various mutually incompatible versions of his family origins and childhood, consistent only in terms of their implausibility. After he grew up he always refused to acknowledge his Jewish provenance, at times manifesting an aggressive level of alienation. By the time he settled in Paris he had for several years been leading what would have been termed at the time a conspicuously "Bohemian" life-style. Later that year he moved to Ticino, living during 1906/07 as part of the Monte Verità community on the edge of Ascona. It was here that he first met the communard brothers Karl and Gustav Gräser. The next year he was in Leipzig when, during the course of his travels, he met the flamboyant Swiss-born modernist novelist-poet Blaise Cendrars, with whom he would later collaborate in Paris.

By 1911 (not for the last time in his life) he had returned to Paris, where during 1911 and 1912 he worked on Les Hommes nouveaux, a newly launched Franco-German literary journal produced by a group of proto-libertarians with Cendrars. Between 1914 and 1918 he lived predominantly in Zürich. In 1915 he crossed paths with a group of Russian revolutionaries, including Vladimir Lenin, Karl Radek and Leon Trotsky. It was also in 1915 that he joined with Hugo Kersten and others to launch Der Mistral, another short-lived internationalist "literary war magazine" (according to the main subtitle on one of the editions). Published in Zürich it was, Szittya wrote in 1923, "the first [pan-]European magazine to be set up during the war .... scorned by the entire Swiss press, and unfortunately, only taken seriously [much] later". During 1916 he became a regular presence at the short-lived Cabaret Voltaire, known to posterity as the cradle of the Dadaist movement, of which at least one admirer credits Szittya as a co-founder. Writing to a friend in 1964, Szittya nevertheless wrote of Der Mistral that it was often "... identified as a forerunner of Dadaism (which it was not) and people therefore assert, incorrectly, that I myself was also a Dadaist".

In 1918 he returned to Hungary where his presence coincided with that year's revolution. He met again with his old friend the socialist poet Lajos Kassák, founder of the anarchist-pacifist magazine A Tett which had been quickly banned on account of its "anti-militarist" tendencies. In 1918–1919 he teamed up with Karl Lohs and Hans Richter to produce the short-lived Dadaist literary periodical "Horizont-Flugschriften" which was published in Berlin, Vienna and Budapest.

He lived between 1921 and 1926 in Berlin, writing and publishing several novels in German during this period. He was becoming increasingly networked with other members of Europe's avant-garde. In 1923 he published "Kuriositäten-Kabinett: Begegnungen mit seltsamen Begebenheiten, Landstreichern, Verbrechern, Artisten, religiös Wahnsinnigen, sexuellen Merkwürdigkeiten, Sozialdemokraten, Syndikalisten, Kommunisten, Anarchisten, Politikern und Künstlern", a volume of pen-portraits and memories. With mentions of around 1,000 individuals, it has been described as an indispensable information pool on Europe's counter-culture during the early decades of the twentieth century, though critics have complained that some of the detail is, allegedly, unreliable. It has been reprinted several times and remains, in commercial terms, Szittya's most successful book. It is not clear whether the book's enduring reputation was helped or hindered by the fact that shortly after initial publication it was temporarily (and briefly) banned. Also during the 1920s in Berlin he wrote for the avant-garde arts magazines Querschnitt and Kunstblatt.

In 1927 Szittya returned to Paris, where he now lived (with interruptions) for the rest of his life, teaming up with the fashion designer Erika Drägert to start a family. They married in 1930 and their daughter Jeanne was born in 1931. When he died more than thirty years later and Erika found herself going through his papers, it became evident that he had never told her, and she had never known, very much about his former life as a foot-loose "vagabond". In Paris he teamed up with Paul Ruhstrat to launch and produce yet another short-lived literary journal (also touching on politics, the arts more broadly, science, theatre, music and the rapidly evolving medium of broadcast radio), "Die Zone". There were eight editions published between 1933 and 1934, including one special edition commemorating the murder, twenty years before, of Jean Jaurès. The tone of "Die Zone" was uncompromisingly anti-fascist or, in Szittya's own words, "anti-Hitlerisch".

As the German armies entered Paris in June 1940 Emil Szittya and his little family were already clear of the city, having fled south with hundreds of thousands of other Parisians. Between 1940 and 1944 he served as a member of the Résistance, based in Limoges. Sources are silent concerning Szittya's Résistance activities. During their four years in Limoges, with his wife Erika, he also undertook an unusual and intriguing research project. They systematically visited and interrogated the local people about their dreams. Their subjects included Résistance fighters, peasants-farmers, men, women and children. And they carefully noted down the details, producing in the process a psychoanalytical portrait of the area at a key stage in history. They refrained from adding any sort of "interpretation" in the notes they took, though the direction of their thinking is sometimes apparent from the answers to their follow-up questions. Biographical descriptions of each of the 82 subjects are restricted to a couple of lines. The fascinating result was published in Paris in 1963, shortly before the author's death, but its appearance went little remarked. However, a reissue, with an introduction by Emmanuel Carrère appeared in 2019, and was enthusiastically reviewed by at least one scholarly critic, who wrote that the 220 page work "cries out for a German [translation and] publisher".

In 1945 the family returned to Paris. They made their home at Rue du Château 149, where Szittya lived for the rest of his life, close to the Montparnasse quarter. For many years he worked at the nearby Café Les Deux Magots, which at that time was famed as a meeting point for the Parisienne literary and intellectual élite. Emil Szittya died in a Paris Tuberculosis sanatorium on 26 November 1964.

== Output (selection) ==
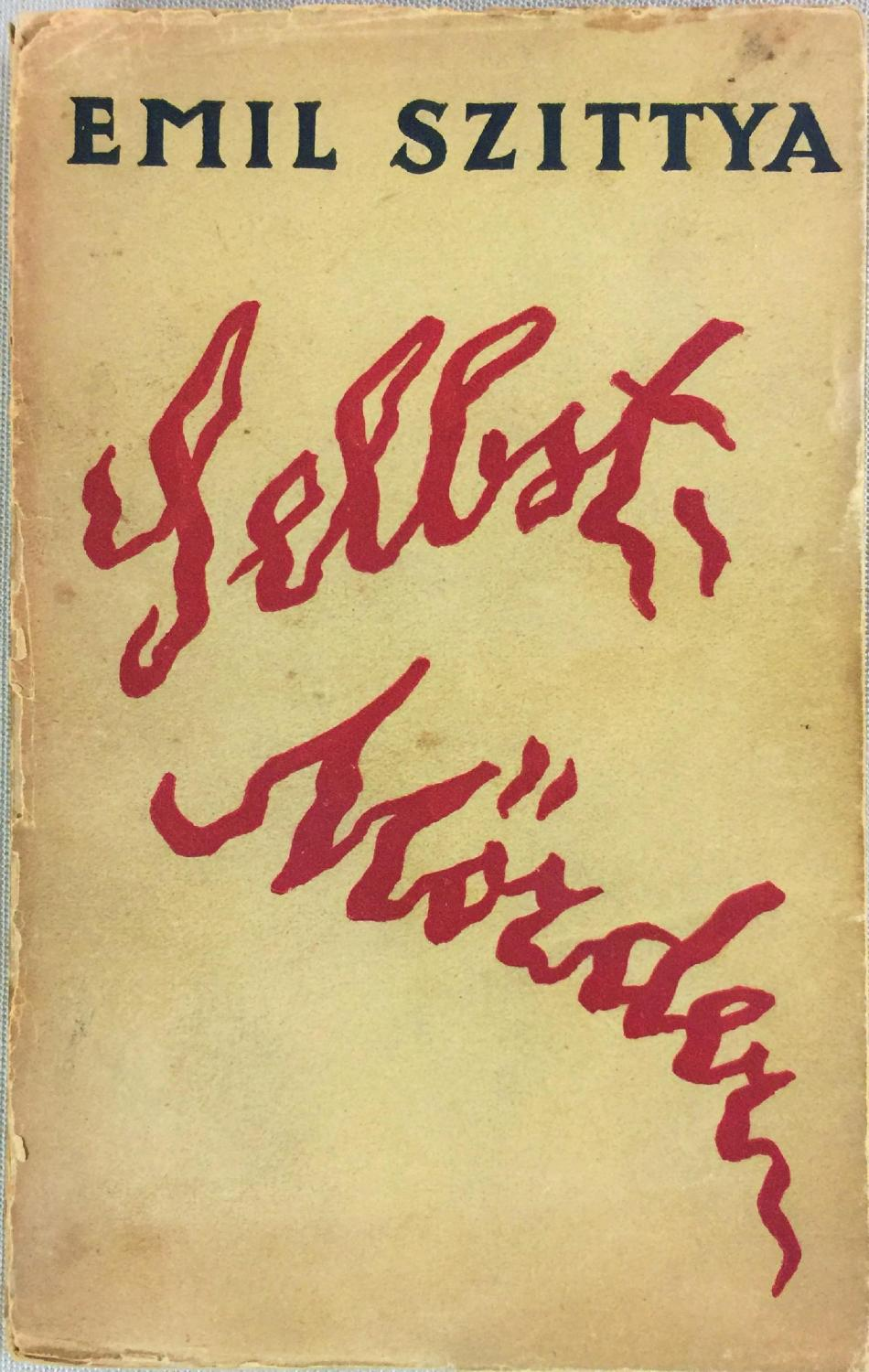
Selbstmörder. Ein Beitrag zur Kulturgeschichte aller Zeiten und Völker. Leipzig 1925

- Die Haschischfilme des Zöllners Henri Rousseau und Tatjana Joukoff mischt die Karten. Budapest 1915.
- Das Spiel eines Erotomanen. Berlin 1920.
- Ein Spaziergang mit manchmal Unnützigem. Wien/Prag/Leipzig 1920.
- Gebete über die Tragik Gottes, Berlin 1922.
- Das Kuriositäten-Kabinett. Konstanz 1923. (Neuausgabe: Verlag Clemens Zerling, Berlin 1979.)
- Klaps oder Wie sich Ahasver als Saint Germain entpuppt. Potsdam 1924.
- Henri Rousseau. Hamburg 1924.
- Malerschicksale. Vierzehn Porträts. Hamburg 1925.
- Selbstmörder. Ein Beitrag zur Kulturgeschichte aller Zeiten und Völker. Leipzig 1925.
- Ernesto de Fiore. Mailand 1927.
- Hoetger. Paris o.J. (ca. 1928).
- Ausgedachte Dichterschicksale. Paris 1928.
- Herbert Garbe et la Sculpture Allemande. O.O., o.J. (um 1929).
- Neue Tendenzen in der Schweizer Malerei. Édition Ars, Paris (1929).
- Le Paysage Français. Paris 1929.
  - Deutsch: Die französische Landschaft. Paris 1929.
- Leopold Gottlieb. Paris 1930.
- Leo von König. Paris 1931.
- Arthur Bryks. Paris 1932.
- L'Art allemand en France. (übersetzt von Lazare Lévine), Paris (1933)
- Notes sur Picasso. Paris 1947.
- Marquet parcourt le monde. Paris 1949.
- Soutine et son temps. Paris 1955.
- Der Mann, der immer dabei war. Hgg. Sabine Haaser. Manfred Lamping. Wien 1986.
- Ein Spaziergang mit manchmal Unnützigem. Prosa 1916–1920. Vergessene Autoren der Moderne, 59. Hg. Walter Fähnders. Siegen 1994.
- Ahasver Traumreiter. Verstörung der Legende. Mit editorischer Notiz. Illustr. Matjaz Vipotnik. Klagenfurt: Wieser 1991. ISBN 3-85129-039-9. Bibliographie pp. 135–137.
- Mit Franz Jung durchquert das Fieber die Strassen. Briefe an Franz Jung. In: Archiv für die Geschichte des Widerstandes und der Arbeit, 18. Fernwald: Germinal 2008. ISSN 0936-1014 pp. 365–376.
- Reise durch das anarchistische Spanien. In: Archiv für die Geschichte des Widerstandes und der Arbeit, 19. Fernwald: Germinal 2011. S. 197–212.
  - Kommentar: Walter Fähnders, Rüdiger Reinecke: Das andere, das verborgene Spanien. In: Archiv für die Geschichte des Widerstandes und der Arbeit, 19. Fernwald: Germinal 2011. pp. 213–220.
- Spaziergang in sich. Roman. In: Gegner. Quartalsschrift, 30. Basisdruck, Berlin 2012. ISSN 1432-2641 pp. 9–16.
  - Kommentar: Walter Fähnders: Es war ihm unangenehm, im Nichts zu sein. Gegner. Quartalsschrift, 30. Basisdruck, Berlin 2012. pp. 16–22.
- Herr Außerhalb illustriert die Welt. Mit Erstdrucken aus dem Nachlass. Reihe: Pamphlete, 28. Hg. Walter Fähnders. Basisdruck, Berlin 2014. ISBN 978-3-86163-149-1.
- Erich Mühsam. Eine Rede. Erstdruck aus dem Nachlass. In: Improvisationen in mehr als zwei Bildern. Hg. von Gregor Ackermann und Walter Delabar. Bielefeld 2015, ISBN 978-3-8498-1106-8, pp. 153–170. (Juni. Magazin für Literatur 49/50.)
- Die sieben Jahre. Ein Kriegsepos. Erstdruck aus dem Nachlass in literaturkritik.de 2016.
- Man will die Spanier zu Sklaven machen und Spanien 1939. In: Archiv für die Geschichte des Widerstandes und der Arbeit, Nr. 20 (2016), pp. 565–570. ISBN 978-3-88663-420-0; ISSN 0936-1014.
  - Kommentar: Walter Fähnders: „Die Felder atmen nicht mehr“. Zum Erstdruck von Emil Szittyas Spanien-Texten. Ebenda, pp. 571–578.

=== Pen-portraits of artist contemporaries ===
Szittya included pen-portraits of leading artists of his generation in many of his books, usually in the form of concise carefully crafted monographs. Those whom he treated in this way included Henri Rousseau, Pablo Picasso, Vincent van Gogh, Marc Chagall, August Wilhelm Dressler, Otto Dix, Oskar Kokoschka, Braque and Masereel.

== Literary estate ==
A substantial literary archive of Emil Szittya's papers is held by the German Literature Archive at Marbach, a short distance to the north of Stuttgart.
