= Lotte Hattemer =

German teacher (1876–1906)

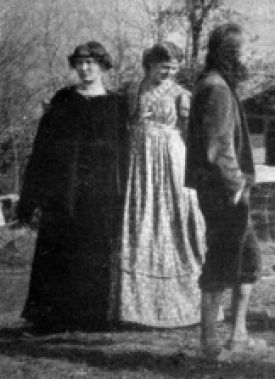
- Ida Hofmann-Oedenkoven, Lotte Hattemer, Henri Oedenkoven; co-founders of Monte Verità
- Born: Pauline Charlotte Babette Hattemer; November 24, 1876; Berlin
- Died: April 19, 1906 (aged 29); Ascona
- Other name: Babette
- Occupation: teacher
- Known for: cofounder of Monte Verità

Lotte Hattemer, born Pauline Charlotte Babette Hattemer (November 24, 1876 in Berlin - April 19, 1906 in Ascona) was a German teacher and co-founder of Monte Verità in Ascona. She died in 1906 under mysterious circumstances, sometimes attributed to suicide.

== Biography ==
Lotte Hattemer, was the daughter of Heinrich Hermann Hattemer, a Catholic telegraph inspector, railroad director, Prussian councilor, and Berlin mayor, and Marie Hermine Josephine, née Kaiser, trained as a teacher in Berlin. To escape Wilhelminism in her parental home, she left Berlin and kept and sustained her living with several jobs, including waitressing in a Hamburg sailor's tavern.

Together with Henri Oedenkoven (1875-1935) the son of the Antwerp industrialist Louis Oedenkoven), Ida Hofmann-Oedenkoven (1864-1926), her sister, the concert singer Jenny Gräser (née Hofmann), and her later husband, First Lieutenant Karl Gräser (1875-1920), formerly stationed in Przemyśl (Galicia), and Gusto Gräser, she was part of the founding group of the Monte Verità Vegetable Cooperative.

Their wish was to found an alternative self subsisting society in 1899, breaking away from consumerism and patriarchal values. They were inspired by the Phalanstère of the philosopher Charles Fourier and advocated free love as well.

The group set out on foot in the fall of 1900 from Munich through the Tyrolean countryside to the Bellagio peninsula on the western shore of Lake Como, southwest of the municipality of Bellagio, where they initially settled. Soon they were on the lookout for a more beautiful area. At the north end of Lake Maggiore, in Ascona, they bought the Monte Monescia vineyard and renamed it Monte Verità, or Mountain of Truth. While Henri Oedenkoven and his partner Ida stayed on the mountain and built a sanatorium, Lotte Hattemer, Karl and Jenny Gräser settled in the neighborhood. Hattemer settled on the high road towards Ronco sopra Ascona in a dilapidated stable without doors or windows. On Monte Verità she was called Babette, Saint Babette, Santa Lotta di Ascona, wild Lotte or Sun Lotte. She appeared charitable, giving the money she received from her father to the needy and her surplus of grapes to children. She made regular pilgrimages to Locarno to follow the teachings of the Theosophists Alfredo Pioda and Franz Hartmann. She voluntarily suffered from starvation and subsisted only occasionally on raw root vegetables and fruits.

Lotte Hattemer died in 1906 under mysterious circumstances. In the fall of 1905, she was found on Monte Verità in a state of confusion with suicidal intentions. During a meeting with her father in Domodossola, he tried in vain to take her to a North German sanatorium. Two days later she died of poisoning. The final police report, published in 1909, mentioned suicide as the cause of death; rumor has it that poisoning with a cocktail of cocaine and opium was the cause, involving psychopathologist Otto Gross, theology student Johannes Nohl, and writer Erich Mühsam. The anarchist painter Sophie Benz committed suicide as well in 1911 with a cocaine cocktail given to her by Otto Gross.

== Posterity ==
In the film Monte Verità – Der Rausch der Freiheit Hannah Herzsprung played the character of Lotte Hattemer.

== Bibliography ==
- Adolf A. Grohmann (1904), Die Vegetarier-Ansiedelung in Ascona und die sogenannten Naturmenschen im Tessin. Referate und Skizzen (in German), Halle: Marhold, pp. 54 f
- "Otto Gross: Lotte Hattemer". Raimund Dehmlow. 2015-06-19.
- Erich Mühsam (1905), Ascona (in German) (2 ed.), Berlin: Guhl, pp. 36–40
- Curt Riess (1977), Ascona. Geschichte des seltsamsten Dorfes der Welt (in German) (3 ed.), Zürich: Europa, pp. 21–24, ISBN 3-85665-506-9
- Berlin Geburtsregister 1874–1899. 1876 Erstregister (in German), 1876-11-25
