= Eduard Baltzer =

German vegetarianism activist (1814–1887)

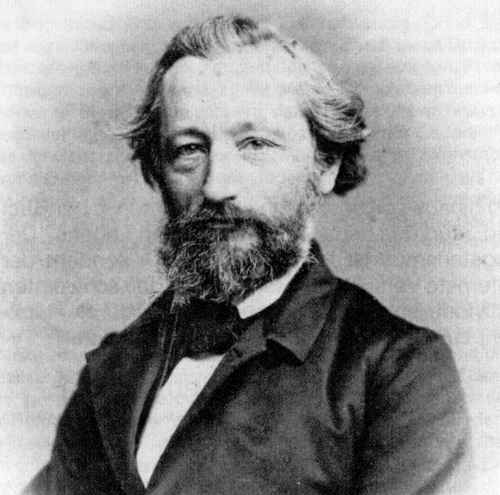
- Born: Wilhelm Eduard Baltzer; 24 October 1814; Hohenleina, Province of Saxony, Prussia
- Died: 24 June 1887 (aged 72); Grötzingen, German Empire

Wilhelm Eduard Baltzer (24 October 1814 – 24 June 1887) was the founder of the first German vegetarian society, the German Natural Living Society (German: Deutscher Verein für natürliche Lebensweise), a supporter of the Revolution of 1848 in Germany and an early popularizer of science.

== Biography ==
Born in the village of Hohenleina in the Prussian Province of Saxony, Baltzer was the son of an Evangelical clergyman. He was educated at the Universities of Leipzig and Halle where he chiefly studied theology. He became a tutor, and was chaplain of the hospital of Delitzsch from 1841 until the beginning of 1847, when he founded at Nordhausen a free religious community (German: Freireligiöse Gemeinde), after having failed to have his nomination to various dioceses confirmed by the authorities.

In 1848 Baltzer was elected to the Frankfurt preliminary parliament (German: Vorparlament), and afterward to the Prussian National Assembly. In 1868 he founded a society and a journal for the promotion of vegetarianism. He continued to be a representative leader until 1881. He lived in retirement at Grotzingen for the last few years of his life, partly occupied in the promotion of vegetarianism.

== Writings ==
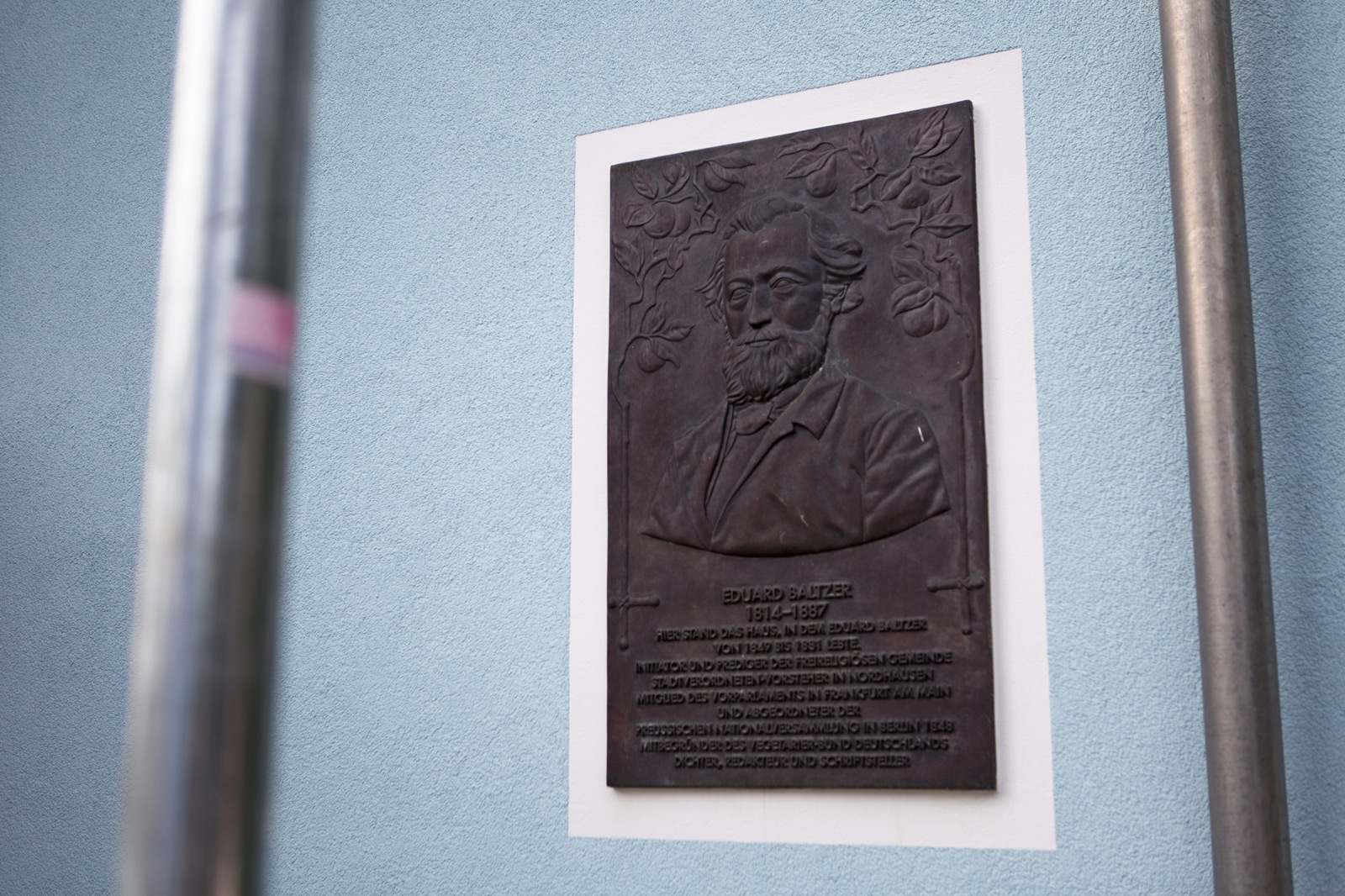
Commemorative plaque at Baltzer Street in Nordhausen

- Das sogenannte Apostolische Glaubensbekenntniss (“The so-called apostolic confession of faith,” Leipsig, 1847)
- Allgemeine Religionsgeschichte (“History of Religion,” Nordhausen, 1854)
- Alte und neue Weltanschauung (“Old and new ways of looking at the world,” 1852-9)
- Das Leben Jesu (“The life of Jesus,” 2d ed., 1861)
- Von der Arbeit (“On work,” 1864)
- Das preussische Verfassungsbuchlein (“A booklet on the Prussian constitution,” 4th ed., 1864)
- Gott, Welt und Mensch (“God, the world, and humanity,” 1869)
- Religionslehrbuch für Schule und Haus freier Gemeinden (“Religious text book for schools and homes of free religious communities,” 1st part, containing Lehrbuch für den ersten Unterricht, “Textbook for first instruction,” 2d ed., 1870)
- Die sittliche Seite der naturgemässen Lebensweise (“The ethical aspects of living in accordance with Nature,” 1870)
- Vegetarisches Kochbuch (“Vegetarian cookbook,” 14th ed., 1900)
