= Gustav Gräser =

German artist and writer (1879–1958)

Gustav "Gusto" Arthur Gräser (16 February 1879 – 27 October 1958) was a German alternative lifestyle advocate, artist, and poet. He is considered one of the founders of communal lifestyle in Germany. Together with his brother and fellow artist Karl Gräser, he co-founded one of the earliest social reform settlements, which was located along Monte Verità in Ascona. His penned and painted works included many of that were not published until a revival of interest during the counterculture of the 1960s emerged.

Gräser was born in Brașov (Kronstadt), a city in the Transylvania region of Austria-Hungary that is now part of Romania. At an early age, he was influenced by the philosophy of social reformer Karl Wilhelm Diefenbach. In 1897, Gräser lived in Diefenbach's commune, Himmelhof, located in Ober Sankt Veit, near Vienna, and embraced his ideas of pacifism, a human civilization in harmony with nature, and a vegetarian diet, while studying art. However, Gräser was dissuaded by Diefenbach's despotic leadership, and left the commune in 1898 to form his own following in Munich. In 1900, Gräser completely cut ties with his hometown to wander, and co-founded his own commune near Monte Verità in Ascona with his brother, Karl Gräser. Among the settlement's inhabitants included several artists and authors such as Otto Gross, Leonhard Frank, Erich Muhsam, Franziska Countess zu Reventlow, and Hermann Hesse, whom Gräser influenced in his written works. Gräser helped fund the commune by giving lectures in various cities and selling copies of his poetry, but was often faced with ridicule for his appearance.

In 1911, Gräser moved his family of six to the outskirts of Berlin. He became a leading figure in the political reconstruction of the youth movement, in particular, the Free German Youth Movement. However, Gräser's teachings were met with hostility, in 1912 he was arrested and expelled from Saxony, and again from Baden in the following year. In 1915, Gräser was deported to Austria and sentenced to death for being a conscientious objector, but, instead, was ruled to be legally insane, and was transported to a mental institution. After he was released, Gräser briefly returned to Mount Verita, before becoming an activist against the First World War. Although he was expelled from Bavaria in 1919, Gräser migrated with a "new crowd" known as the "crusade of love" with his associate, Friedrich Muck-Lamberty, which was a subject in Hesse's story, Journey to the East. In 1927, Gräser began public speaking in Berlin's Anti-War Museum, settled in the commune of Grunhurst, and traveled through Germany with his son, Otto Brobohmig, to distribute his writings. When the Nazi Party came to power in 1933, Grunhurst was destroyed, and many of its inhabitants, including some of Gräser's family, were killed or sent to internment camps in 1936. Gräser managed to avoid capture by fleeing to Munich, living in seclusion in fellow poets' attics, and wrote some of his most acclaimed pieces including Siebenmah and Wunderbar.

After continuing his travels through Germany, Gräser died in 1958 in Munich. His unpublished poetry was saved before the destruction of his home and preserved in the Municipal Library in Munich.

== Works ==
- Efeublätter. Gedichte. Wien 1902.
- Ein Freund ist da – mach auf! Flugschrift, Berlin 1912.
- Winke zur Genesung unsres Lebens. Sprüche und Gedichte. Ascona 1918.
- Zeichen des Kommenden. Sieben Steindrucke mit Textblättern. Dresden 1925.
- Notwendwerk. Zeichnungen und Gedichte. Steindruckmappe. Dresden 1926.
- Bucheckern. Eine Druckschrift. Berlin 1930.
- Wortfeuerzeug. Sprüche und Gedichte. Berlin 1930.
- Tao. Das heilende Geheimnis. Büchse der Pandora, Wetzlar 1979, ISBN 3-88178-032-7, und Umbruch-Verlag, Recklinghausen 2008, ISBN 978-3-937726-04-5.
- AllBeDeut. Unsere Sprachlaute – heimliche Schlüssel zum Aufschluss unsrer Welt. Deutsches Monte Verità Archiv Freudenstein 2000.
- Erdsternzeit. Eine Auswahl aus dem Spätwerk. Herausgegeben von Hermann Müller. Umbruch-Verlag, Recklinghausen 2007 und 2009, ISBN 978-3-937726-02-1.
- Gedichte des Wanderers. Herausgegeben von Frank Milautzcki. Verlag im Proberaum 3, Klingenberg 2006.
- Der Liebe Macht. Ölgemälde im Museum Casa Anatta auf dem Monte Verità, Ascona
