= Monte Verità =

Colony on the hill Monescia near Ascona in Ticino, Switzerland

Coordinates: 46°09′30.52″N 8°43′29.43″E

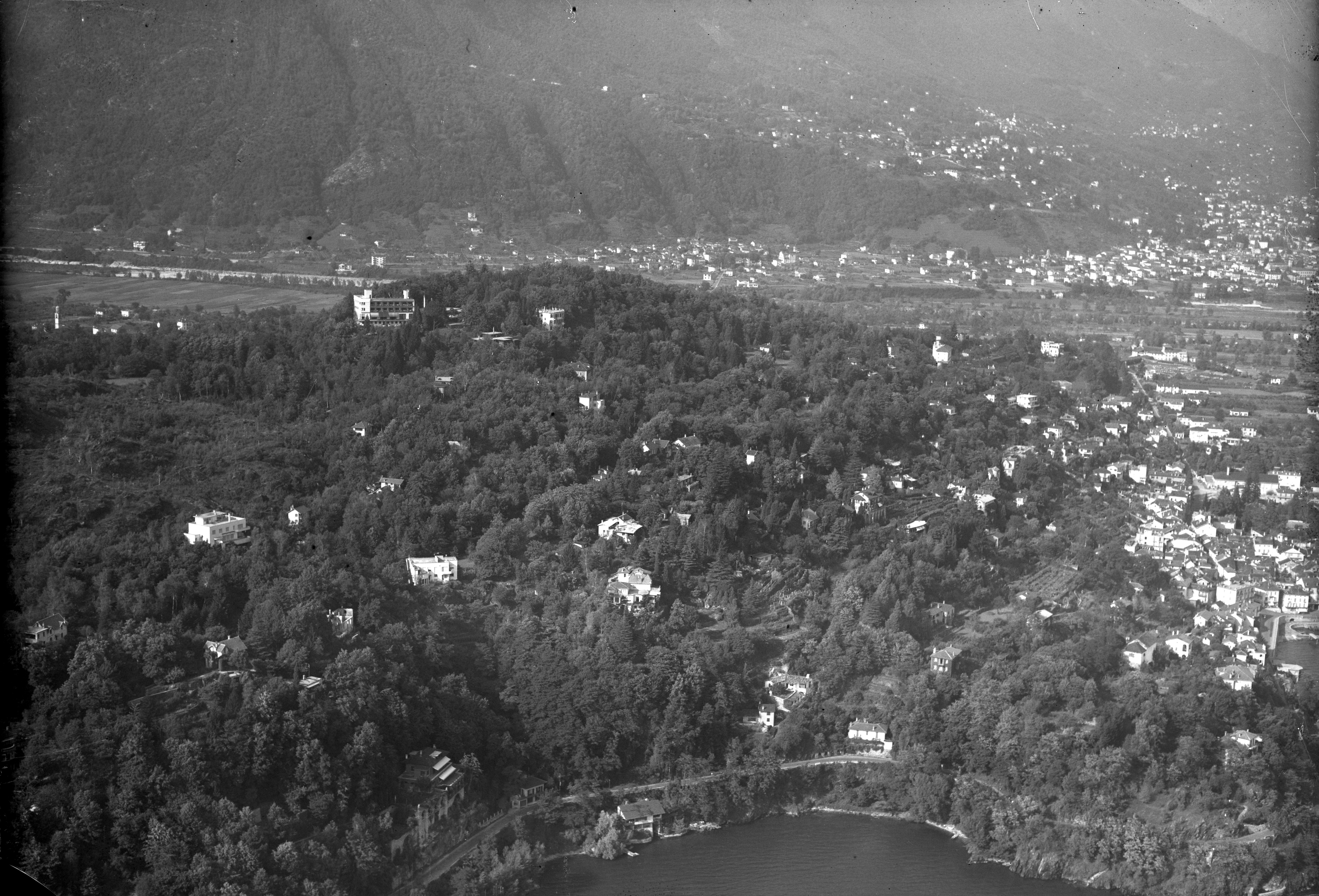
Monte Verità, historical aerial photo from 1946, by Swiss photographer Werner Friedli

Monte Verità (Italian; German 'Berg Wahrheit', meaning "Mount Truth" or "Mountain of Truth") is a hill standing 321 metres above sea level (1053 feet) and a cultural-historical ensemble in the Swiss canton of Ticino. The site is located in the municipality of Ascona, about half a kilometre (500 yards) north-west of the old town. Situated on Lake Maggiore, Monte Verità was a well-known meeting place for life-reformers (Lebensreformer), pacifists, artists, writers, and supporters of various alternative movements in the first decades of the 20th century. After 1940, the place lost its importance. An attempt at a revival in the late 1970s met with very limited success.

Monte Verità was originally the name of the local "Nature Healing Sanctuary Sun Sanatorium" (in German: Naturheilstätte Sonnen-Kuranstalt) established on the hill Monte Monescia. This name first appeared in a brochure published in 1902. Shortly afterwards, the sanatorium settlement was renamed "Sanatorium Monte Verità". In the period that followed, the name Monte Verità was also transferred to the entire hill, which was formerly known as Monte Monescia.

== History ==
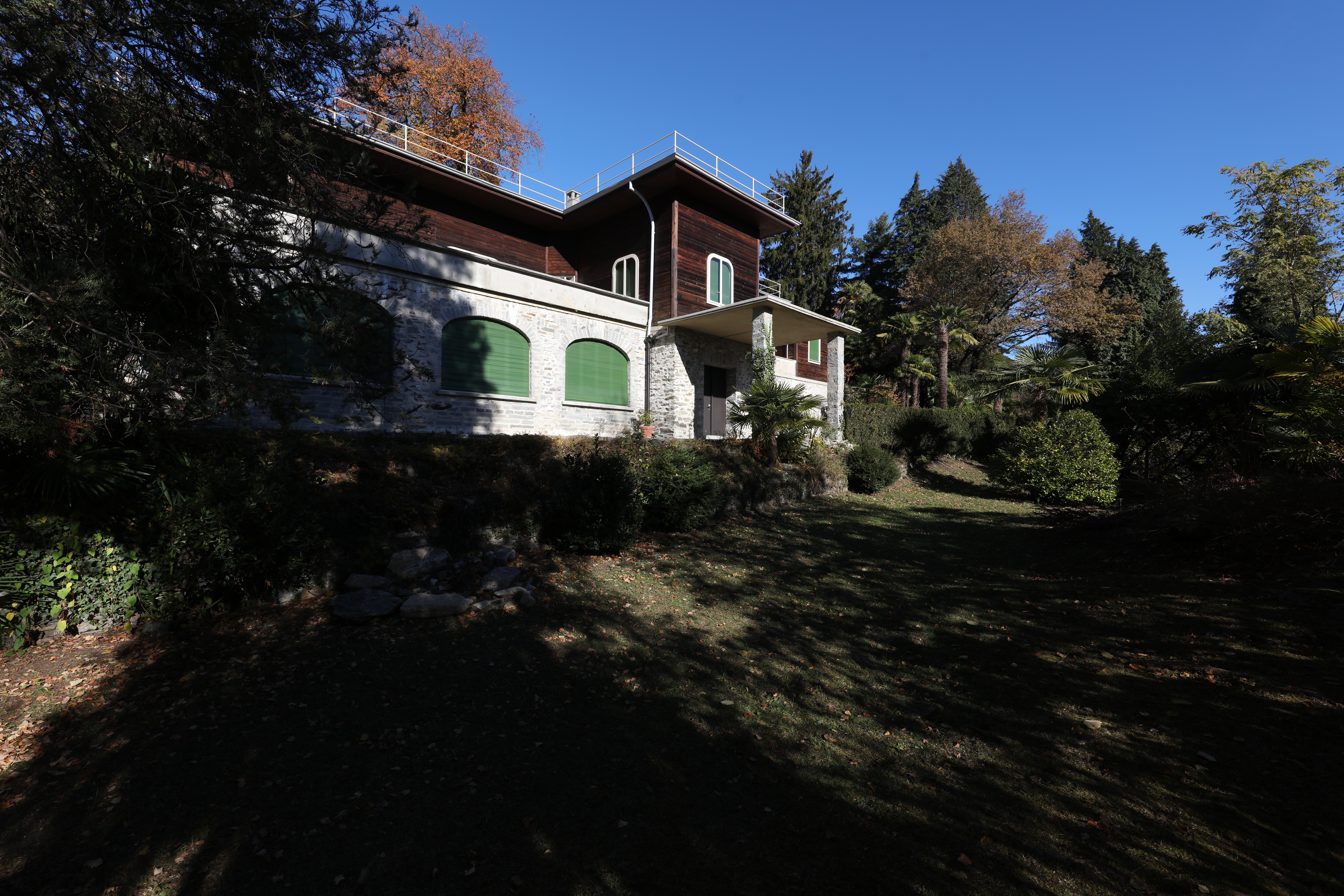
Casa Anatta, the residence of the vegetable cooperative and sanatorium colony founders, built in 1902.

=== Intellectual and political influences on the founding of Monte Verità ===
A whole series of foreign intellectuals who had their temporary or permanent residence around Lake Maggiore in the 19th century belonged to the prehistory of the Monte Verità settlement project. The area around Locarno was then a haven for political rebels, including various Russian anarchists. Among them was Mikhail Bakunin, who had moved to Ticino in November 1869. Bakunin first lived in Locarno and later bought a villa in Minusio, which became a refuge for revolutionaries who were wanted on arrest warrants.

The Russian-born Baroness Antoinette de Saint Léger acted as a great hostess to many well-known artists and writers. The Brissago Islands, which she had owned since 1885, was the site of great festivals; they are within sight of Ascona. Around 1889, the politician and theosophist Alfredo Pioda, together with Franz Hartmann and Countess Constance Wachtmeister, developed a plan to build a theosophical monastery called "Fraternitas" on Monte Monescia. Presumably, the German life-reformer Karl Max Engelmann, who had settled in Monte Brè, was a candidate for this never-built monastery. Engelmann belonged to the "Pythagorean League" around the nature-philosopher preacher Johannes Friedrich Guttzeit and was running a vegetarian guesthouse.

In November 1900, Engelmann met the Gräser brothers and probably drew their attention to the property on Monte Monescia that had already been purchased by Alfredo Pioda. At that time, the hill was a vineyard threatened by phylloxera infestation, and shepherds and goatherds grazed their herds on the bare hilltop. Henri Oedenkoven and Ida Hofmann followed the Gräser brothers' proposal to acquire this site as a settlement.

=== Beginnings of the Monte Verità settlement project: Bled, 1899 ===
The actual story of the alternative settlement project began as early as 1899 in Bled (at that time belonging to Austria-Hungary, today in Slovenia). It was there that the music teacher Ida Hofmann, who had grown up in Transylvania, and the Belgian industrialist's son Henri Oedenkoven met during a stay at the Arnold Rikli natural healing sanatorium. Both were unknown to each other until then but developed a strong sympathy for each other in the few weeks of their common cure therapy. They were joined by Karl Gräser, an officer in the Austro-Hungarian Army who was also taking a cure therapy from the heliopath ("Sun Doctor") Arnold Rikli and intended to resign as soon as possible from his army post. Karl's views were influenced by his brother Gustav Gräser, an artist who had been wandering for a year. The three Gräser brothers Karl, Ernst, and Gustav went together on a hike from Bled to Florence. The aspiring painter Ernst Gräser later also lived temporarily on "Monte Verità" and lured fellow students such as Willi Baumeister, Oskar Schlemmer, and Johannes Itten to the closely related colony in Amden on Walensee.

=== Founding meeting of the vegetable cooperative: Munich, October 1900 ===
An intensive exchange of letters developed between Oedenkoven and Hofmann, which led to a meeting in Munich in October 1900. In addition to the initiators Oedenkoven and Hofmann, the brothers Karl and Gustav "Gusto" Gräser attended this meeting, as well as Ida Hofmann's sister Jenny, a trained opera singer, the teacher Lotte Hattemer, and her friend Ferdinand Brune from Graz, a theosophically influenced son of a landowner. After "Oedenkoven's plan" of the founding of a so-called "vegetable cooperative" had been presented, the decision was made that "each individual's movable property [...] should be contributed to the founding of a natural healing institute [...]". The main part of the expected profit would go back to the project, and the rest of the profit would be distributed among the members. If a member, for whatever reason, intends to leave the project community at a later date, the paid-in capital should be returned to him as soon as "it is liquidated". It was also decided that the cooperative should be founded on the shore of one of the northern Italian lakes and that, in order to find the right place, they wanted to set off immediately – on foot.

There were already models for the Monte Verità settlement project. This included, among others, the Oranienburg "Eden Cooperative Fruit Growing Colony" (Eden Gemeinnützige Obstbau-Siedlung). The direct precursor was the artist community around the German painter and life-reformer Karl Wilhelm Diefenbach (1851–1913) at the "Himmelhof" near Vienna. Gustav Gräser had been his student there in 1898 and also conveyed Diefenbach's views to his brothers Karl and Ernst Gräser.

=== Establishment of the vegetable cooperative and nature healing sanctuary sun sanatorium ===
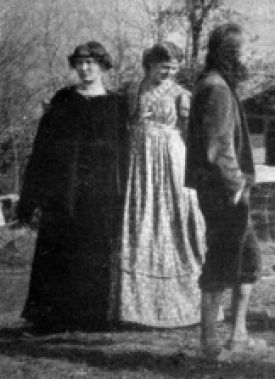
Photo of Ida Hofmann (left), Lotte Hattemer (centre), and Henri Oedenkoven (right); co-founders of Sanatorium Monte Verità, winter 1902–03

In the fall of 1900, the 25-year-old industrialist' son from Antwerp Henri Oedenkoven, and German pianist Ida Hofmann, together with Karl Gräser, Gustav Gräser, and Lotte Hattemer, found what they were looking for in Ascona, Switzerland, after a few weeks of searching. They bought property on Monte Monescia from Alfredo Pioda. With purchases from other owners, they acquired four hectares (10 acres). They founded their "vegetable cooperative," a settlement community initially on a vegan and later vegetarian basis, and in 1902 they gave it the name Sanatorium Monte Verità. This name did not hide the claim of the new owners to be in possession of the truth. Rather, the new name was meant to express the effort to live truly. Ida Hofmann later wrote in the new orthography developed mainly by Henri Oedenkoven:

The meaning of the name of the establishment which we have chosen [is so] to explain, that we in no way claim to have found the 'truth', to monopolize, but that we, contrary to the often lying behaviour of the business world and striving for it from the conventional prejudices of society, in word and deed "was" to help the lie to be destroyed, the truth to be successful.

— Ida Hofmann

=== Nature healing sanctuary sun sanatorium ===
In order to finance the settlement project and at the same time make it known to a larger public, Oedenkoven and his partner Hofmann established the "Nature Healing Sanctuary Sun Sanatorium" (in German: Naturheilstätte Sonnen-Kuranstalt), which was shortly afterwards renamed "Sanatorium Monte Verità". One of the early guests of this institution was the barefoot itinerant preacher Gustaf Nagel, who took a short break on Monte Verità in November 1902 on his missionary journey from Arendsee to Jerusalem.

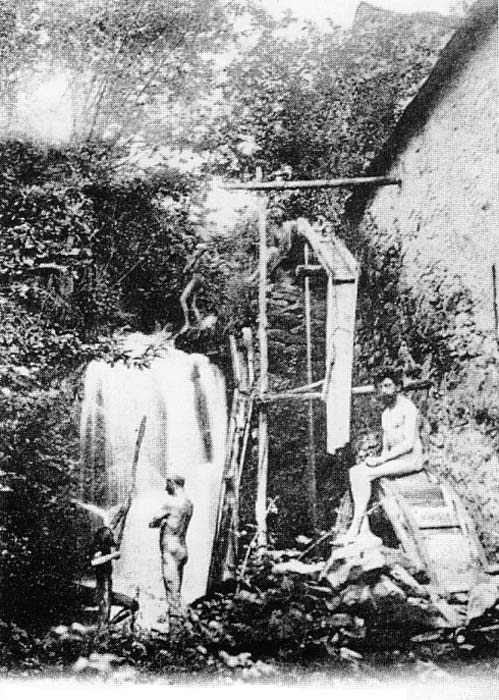
Photo postcard of the waterfall near the old mill, Monte Verità, 1904. Light-and-air bathing nude in nature; on the left is the German physician Raphael Friedeberg, who brought several anarchists, like Peter Kropotkin, to Monte Verità. Friedeberg also invited the German writer and publicist Erich Mühsam (seated, right) to the natural healing Sanatorium Monte Verità.

Anarchist physician Raphael Friedeberg moved to Ascona in 1904, attracting many other anarchists to the area. Artists and other famous people attracted to this hill included Hermann Hesse, Carl Jung, Erich Maria Remarque, Hugo Ball, Else Lasker-Schüler, Stefan George, Isadora Duncan, Carl Eugen Keel, Paul Klee, Carlo Mense, Arnold Ehret, Rudolf Steiner, Mary Wigman (at that time still Wiegmann), Max Picard, Ernst Toller, Henry van de Velde, Fanny zu Reventlow, Rudolf von Laban, Frieda and Else von Richthofen, Otto Gross, Erich Mühsam, Walter Segal, Max Weber, Gustav Stresemann, and Gustav Nagel.

At the beginning of the 20th century, the Lombardy term balabiott, which can be translated as "dancing naked" or "naked dancer," was often used to describe someone who is carefree or uninhibited. It was used by the Ticino peasants to designate the heterogeneous community of utopians, vegetarians, naturists, and theosophists who settled on the slopes of Mount Monescia (renamed Monte Verità). This community, inspired by the theories of Bakunin and Mühsam (famous anarchists), Oedenkoven, Hofmann, and the Gräser's (utopian socialists), Hartmann and Pioda (vegetarian theosophists and humanists), and von Laban (theorist of the "reform of life"), was mainly financed by the Northern European nobility. These nobles were fascinated by theories that aimed at the spiritual and physical elevation of man, also through the artistic expression of the body and the sexual revolution. The local inhabitants observed with perplexity the nonconformist attitudes of the members of the community and had hastily catalogued them as fools due to their antics.

Monte Verità has been cited as an example of "light asceticism" which arose during the Belle Epoque, inspired by Tolstoyan values. The colonists "abhorred private property, practiced a rigid code of morality, strict vegetarianism, and introduced health aspects of the German Freikörperkultur movement (FKK, free body culture, also known as naturism). They rejected convention in marriage and dress, party politics, and dogmas: they were tolerantly intolerant."

=== Rudof von Laban school for art ===
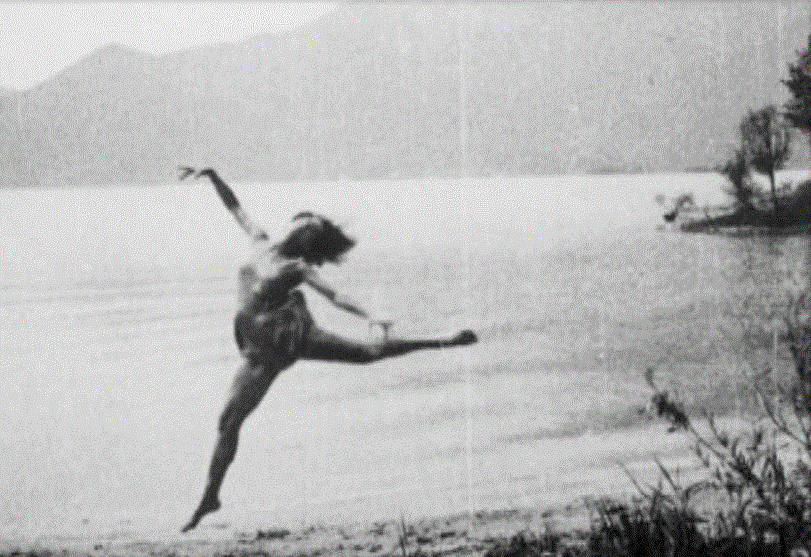
German expressionist dance therapist Mary Wigman (Wiegmann) at Monte Verità on Lake Maggiore, enrolled at the Rudolf von Laban School for Art between 1913 and 1918

From 1913 to 1918, Rudolf von Laban operated a "School for Art" on Monte Verità.

=== Occultist Theodor Reuss ===
In 1917, the occultist Theodor Reuss, and master of Ordo Templi Orientis, staged a conference on Monte Verità covering many themes, including societies without nationalism, women's rights, mystic freemasonry, and dance as art, ritual, and religion. The conference also addressed the "ecstatic release" in the mysterious procedures on the "paths to enlightenment". Reuss, Grandmaster of his lodge, organized a "cult of the Mary" based on "brotherhood and sisterhood" and prepared himself to seduce the colony's women. The colony director, Henri Oedenkoven, having had enough of the midnight erotic-orgiastic rituals that took place in Reuss' lodge, where men and women would gather in rows simultaneously, had promptly thrown Reuss out. Insulted as a charlatan and devourer of women, Reuss left the Monte Verità colony.

=== Holistic health retreat ===
From 1923 to 1926, Monte Verità was operated as a hotel by artists Werner Ackermann, Max Bethke, and Hugo Wilkens. In 1926, it was acquired by Baron Eduard von der Heydt. The following year, a new Modernist-style hotel was built by Emil Fahrenkamp. Eduard von der Heydt died in 1964, and the site became the property of the Canton of Ticino.

== Present ==
Monte Verità is currently home to the Swiss Federal Institute of Technology in Zürich convention centre, Congressi Stefano Franscini (CSF), as well as a museum comprising three buildings: the Casa Anatta, a flat-roofed brick and wooden building built in 1902, it served as the colony founders' residence and now houses an exhibition of the site's history; the Casa Selma, a light-and-air bathing sanatorium hut built in 1904 by the first settlers; and a building housing the panoramic painting "The Clear World of the Blessed" by Elisar von Kupffer. The hill is also the site of a tea garden and Japanese teahouse. Since 2013, Monte Verità has also been the home to the literature festival Eventi letterari Monte Verità.

== In fiction ==
A fictionalized version of the colony at Monte Verità is the subject of a short story named "Monte Verità" by the Cornish author Daphne du Maurier, which appeared in The Apple Tree published in 1952, and then republished under the name The Birds and Other Stories. A.S. Byatt's 2009 novel The Children's Book mentions the colony, as does Robert Dessaix's 1996 novel Night Letters.

Monte Verita is the location for some of the climactic action in the graphic novel trilogy Suffrajitsu: Mrs. Pankhurst's Amazons (2015).

The novel "El miedo te come el alma" by Eduardo Sguiglia (2017) refers in several passages to the community that inhabited Monte Veritá at the beginning of the last century.

== Gallery ==
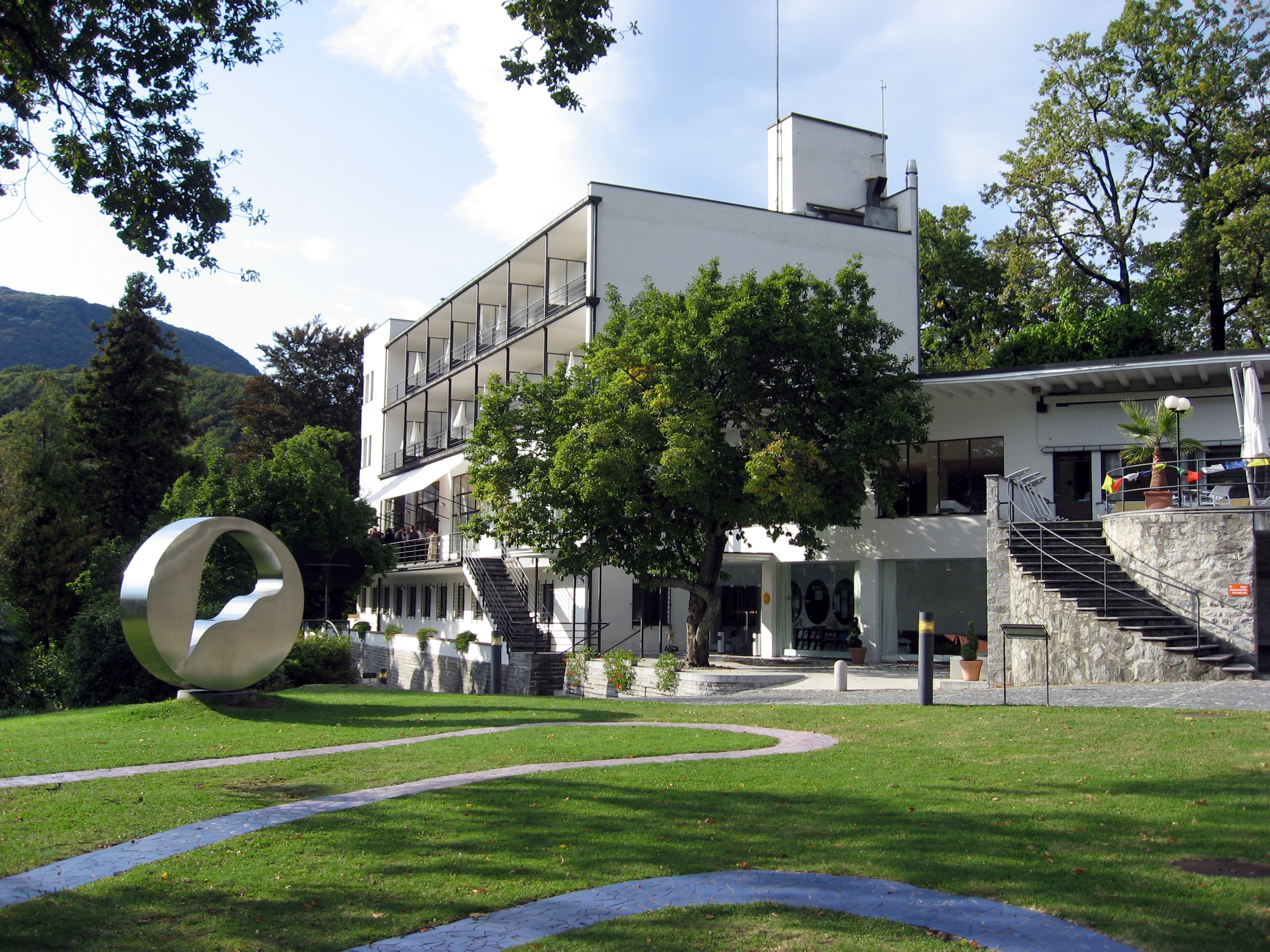
Hotel on Monte Verità, designed by architect Emil Fahrenkamp in 1927; built in Bauhaus style in 1928. Fahrenkamp furnished it with part of his East-Asian art collection. The hotel was renovated in 2008.

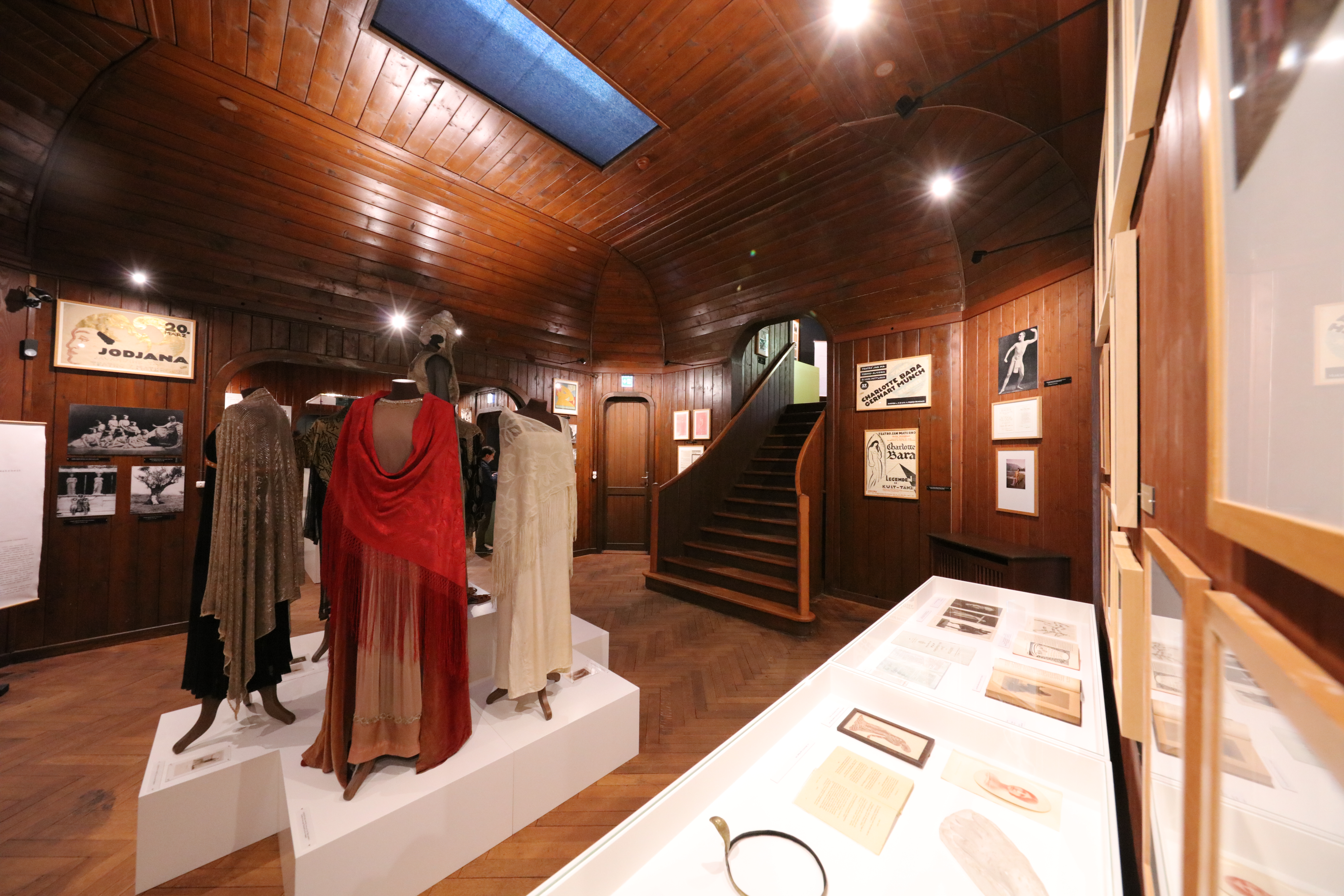
Casa Anatta, interior showing part of the museum exhibition.

Casa Selma, built in 1904, one of the light-and-air bathing sanatorium huts, now featuring a museum.

Tea Garden, Monte Verità

Teahouse, Monte Verità

Casa Russi, named after numerous Russian students who spent time on Monte Verità after 1910.

Map of the Monte Verità site, 2017

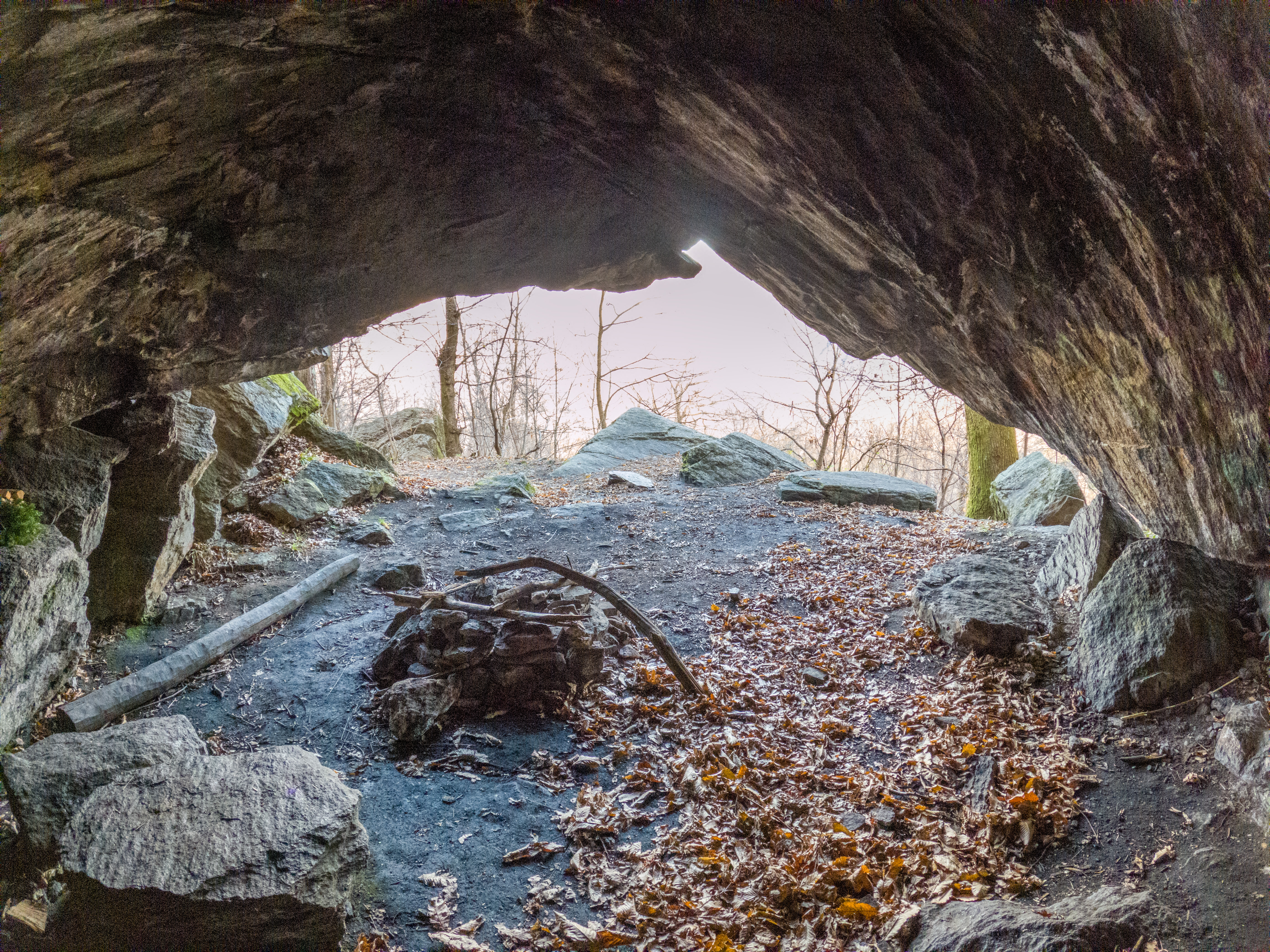
Gustav "Gusto" Gräser's Cave near Losone, Ascona. At the beginning of the 20th century, the rock grotto was the temporary residence of the German-Austrian artist and dropout Gusto Gräser, which is why it is still called Gräser Cave today. Allegedly, Hermann Hesse also lived there for a while in his younger years

== See also ==
- Lebensreform (German and Swiss life-reform movement)
- Freikörperkultur (free body culture)
- Karl Wilhelm Diefenbach (pioneering social reformer)

== References and sources ==
Notes

Sources

- Green, Martin (1986). Mountain of Truth: The Counterculture Begins: Ascona, 1900–1920. University Press of New England.
- Landmann, Robert (1979). Ascona – Monte Verità (in German). Ullstein. ISBN 3-548-34013-X.
- Museo Monte Verità handout "Highlights in the History of Monte Verità", Edition June 2007.
- MONTE Verità Ascona et le génie du lieu, Kaj Noschis, Presses polytechniques et universitaires romandes, arts & culture n°73, 2011
- Edgardo Franzosini (2014). Sul Monte Verità. Il Saggiatore, Milano ISBN 978-884-2819-516.
