= Naturism in Germany =

Lifestyle of living without clothes in Germany

Naturism is a cultural and social movement practicing, advocating and defending social nudity in private and in public. It is particularly popular in Germany where it goes under the name Freikörperkultur (FKK). FKK promotes a lifestyle based on personal, family and/or social nudism in the "great outdoors" environment. Naturism grew out of the German Lebensreform movement and the Wandervogel youth movement of 1896, and has been adopted in many neighbouring European countries and was taken by the German diaspora to North America and other continents.

In 1974, the International Naturist Federation (INF) defined naturism as:

Naturism is a lifestyle in harmony with nature, expressed through personal and social nudity, and characterised by self-respect of people with different opinions and of the environment.

== History ==
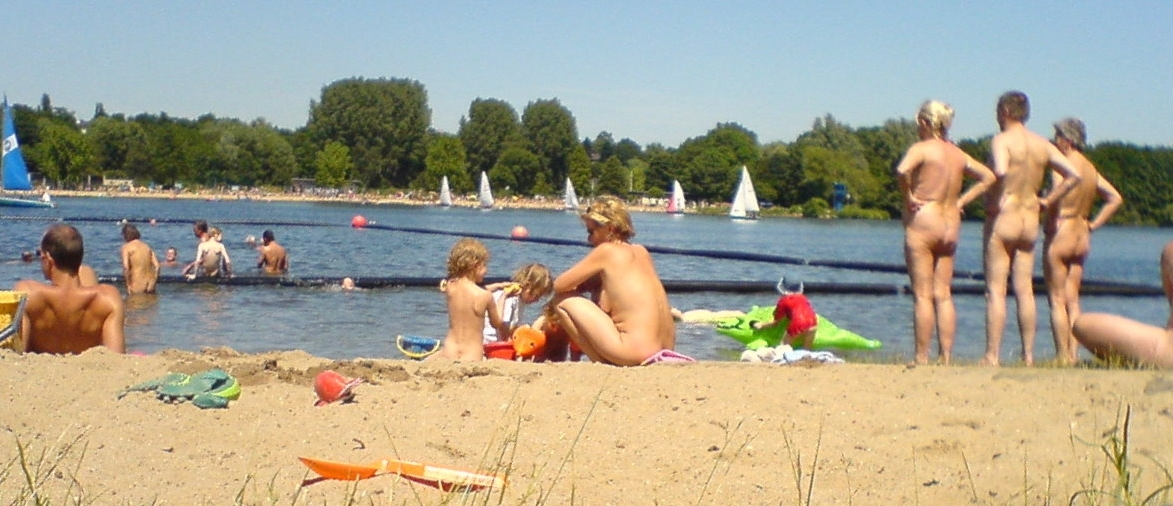
FKK public communal recreation area on Lake Unterbach; Strandbad Süd, Düsseldorf-Unterbach, Germany

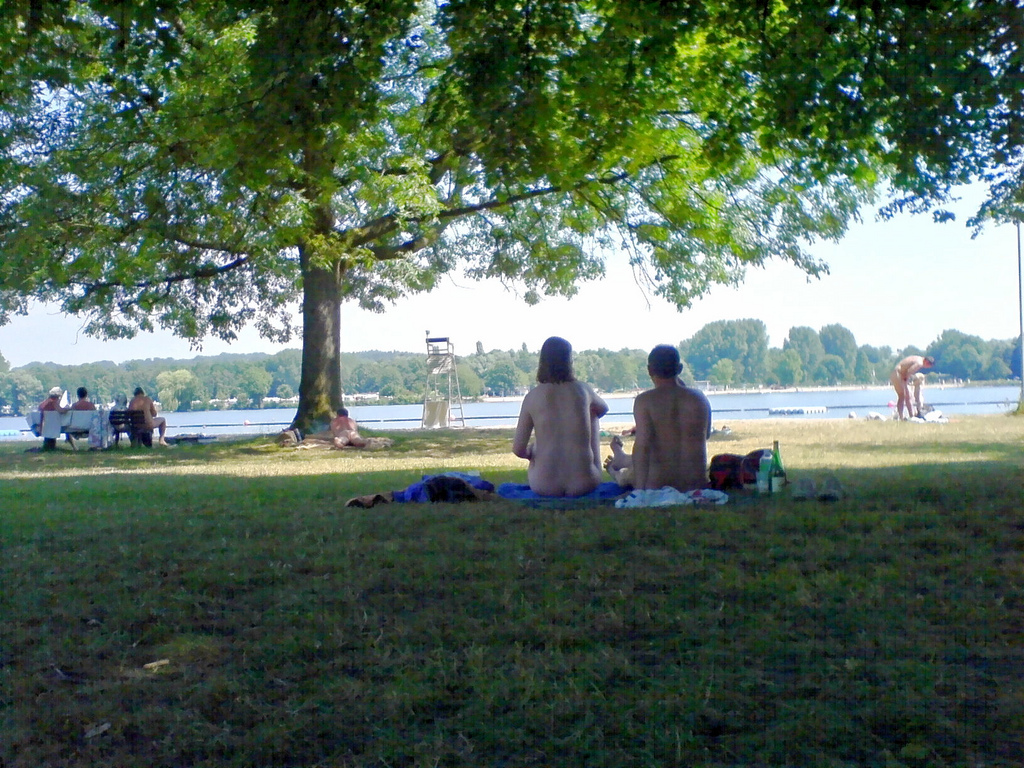
Public naturist recreation area at Lake Unterbach; Strandbad Süd, Düsseldorf-Unterbach, Germany

In late 19th century Germany, the idea of removing all clothing in an outdoors environment in order to liberate oneself was revolutionary. German naturism (Freikörperkultur, FKK) was part of the Lebensreform movement and the Wandervogel youth movement of 1896, from Steglitz, Berlin which promoted ideas of fitness and vigour. At the same time doctors from the natural healing movement were using heliotherapy, treating diseases such as tuberculosis, rickets, rheumatism and scrofula with exposure to sunlight.

At the start of the twentieth century, the German naturism movement looked to Scandinavia as a model. The term "nude culture" (Nacktkultur) refers to a network of over 200 associations or clubs in Germany that promote nude recreation as a way of connecting the individual to nature. The term was coined in 1902 by Heinrich Pudor, who published a 3-volume treatise in 1906 connecting nudism, vegetarianism and social reform. However, its roots might go back as far as the 1870s. Its major promoters were Karl Wilhelm Diefenbach, Richard Ungewitter, Heinrich Pudor, Hans Surén and Adolf Koch. Germany published the first journal of nudism between 1902 and 1932. The German naturism movement was careful to de-eroticise the nude body, which was not regarded as sexually provocative in itself. Instead, it was believed that civilisation had taught us to look upon nudity as sexual.

The naturist movement became well established in Germany from the 1920s onwards, more so than in any other country. It was portrayed as health-giving and also gained prominence for its Utopian ideals. It became politicised by radical socialists who believed it would lead to a breaking down of society and classlessness. It became associated with pacificism. In 1926, Adolf Koch established a Physical Culture School where mixed-gender exercises were done nude, including open air exercises and other physical fitness regimens outdoors, as part of a programme of "physical hygiene". In 1929, the Berlin school hosted the first International Congress on Nudity.

The naturist movement in Germany also saw nudity as serving the objectives of "racial hygiene" and eugenics. During the National Socialist Gleichschaltung era, naturism both benefited from official recognition and sponsorship for its health benefits and was persecuted as officials argued over the concept of the nude culture (Nacktkultur). In March 1933, Prussian Minister of the Interior Hermann Göring passed laws limiting mixed-gender nudism, as a reaction to what he regarded as the increasing immorality of the Weimar state. In January 1934, Reichmeister for the Interior, Wilhelm Frick passed edicts restricting naturism due to fears that it was a breeding ground for Marxists and homosexuals.

However, prohibition did not mean the end of nudism as it had some support from SS leaders. Reichmeister Frick's ban lasted one month. Within a year nudism was being practised with full state support again. The rules were eventually softened in July 1942. (Note: See Freikörperkultur § Geschichte on German Wikipedia.) Nevertheless, all naturism clubs had to register with Kraft durch Freude, which meant excluding Jews and communists. Also, they had to keep all activities well out in the countryside so there would be virtually no chance of being seen by others.

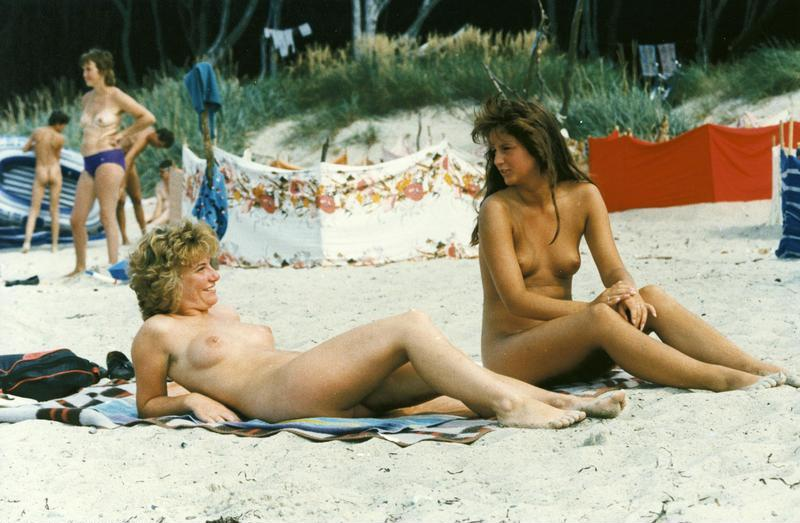
Young East German women at a naturist beach in 1988

After the war, East Germans were free to practice nudism, chiefly at beaches rather than clubs (private organizations being regarded as potentially subversive by the government). Nudists became a large element in German left-wing politics. The Proletarische Freikörperkulturbewegung subsection of the Workers Sports Organisation had 60,000 members. The popularity of naturism in East Germany was also partly due to the fact that religion played less of a role in that society. After German reunification, objections to naturism at the Baltic Sea beaches on the German-Polish border were raised among Poland's predominantly Catholic population.

In West Germany, and today, united Germany there are many clubs, parks and beaches open to naturists. Since reunification, however, nudity has become less common in the former eastern zone. Vacationing in Mediterranean France at the large Cap d'Agde resort also became popular for Germans when it opened in the late 1960s, and Germans are typically the most commonly seen foreigners at nude beaches all around Europe.

== Facilities ==
There are some 147 naturist/FKK societies in Germany that are part of the national Deutscher Verband für Freikörperkultur (German Association for Free Body Culture), with a further 14 affiliated societies in Kärnten, Austria, along with a plethora of official beaches, and FKK zones in city parks. For instance, the Englischer Garten in Munich has two large areas on the banks of the Eisbach, between the city centre and the university.

=== Nacktwandern ===
Organised nude hiking through the open countryside is a popular naturist recreation activity in Germany, called Nacktwandern.

== See also ==
- Deutscher Verband für Freikörperkultur
