= Freikörperkultur =

Movement for social nudity and naked lifestyle

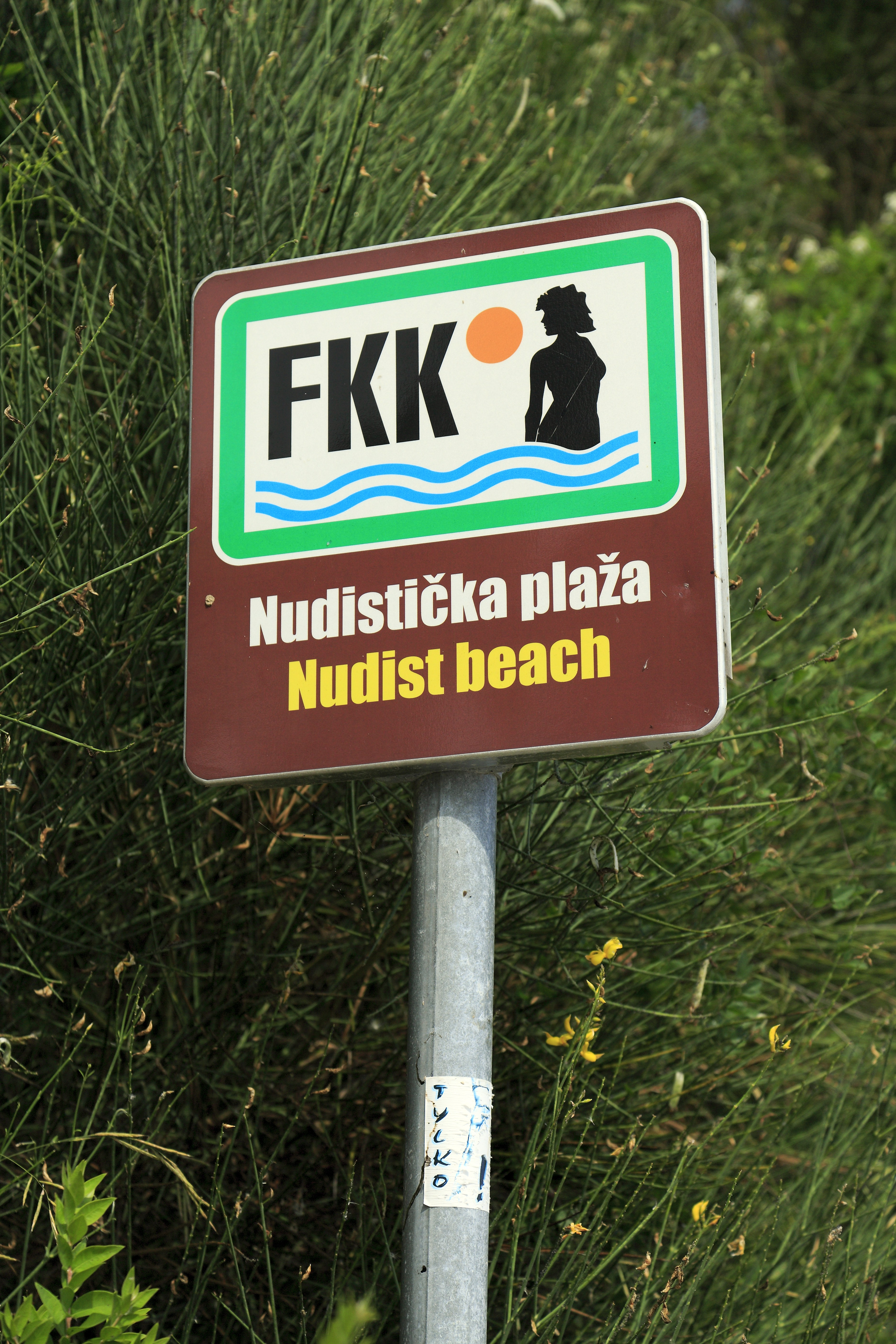
"FKK" designated area signage on a beach in Brač, Croatia

Freikörperkultur (FKK), meaning 'free body culture', is a social and health culture that originated in the German Empire, with its beginnings historically rooted in the Lebensreform social movement of the late 19th century. It promotes the health benefits of nudity—such as exposure to light, air, and sun—alongside a broader aim to reform life and society. Freikörperkultur shares cultural and philosophical ties with naturism and nudism, which involve communal nudity among individuals and families during leisure time, sports, and everyday life.

By the 20th century, recognised for its public health benefits, the practice of communal open-air nudity became increasingly visible in the German cultural sphere, shaped by growing interest in nature, hygiene, and overall wellbeing. This cultural emergence was partly a response to the lifestyle pressures of industrialised urban society, with advocates viewing nudity in natural environments as a restorative contrast to the alienation of modern city life. Public health reformers and Lebensreform adherents championed regular exposure to light, air, and sun—not merely as medical advice, but as a philosophical gesture toward vitality, simplicity, mental relaxation, and social renewal. Today, there are only a few legal restrictions on public nudity in Germany. Under the terms 'naturism' and 'nudism', it is now internationally widespread, with associations and designated public spaces in numerous countries in Europe, North and South America, Australia, Africa, Asia, and the Caribbean. The greatest concentration remains in Central Europe and Scandinavia.

== In general ==
=== Definition ===
Freikörperkultur-inspired naturism is defined as an attitude and way of life by the International Naturist Federation as follows:

The practice of communal nudity is an essential characteristic of naturism, making, as it does, the maximum use of the natural agents of sun, air, and water. It restores one's physical and mental balance through being able to relax in natural surroundings, by exercise and respect for the basic principles of hygiene and diet. It encourages many activities that develop one's creativity. Complete nudity is the most suitable clothing for getting back to nature, and is certainly the most visible aspect of naturism, even if it is not the only one. It exerts a steadying and balancing influence on human beings, freeing them from the stresses caused by the taboos and provocations of today's society and shows the way to a more simple, healthy and human way of life.

— Definition of the International Naturist Federation (INF/FNI) from the Cap d'Agde World Congress, 1974

=== Content ===
Behind the Freikörperkultur movement is a philosophy that views the naked body as natural and free from shame. The movement emphasised that practicing full nudity allowed the body to function naturally, improving comfort and relaxation while being fully exposed to natural elements such as light, air, and sun. The communal practice of nudity within Freikörperkultur is widely regarded as liberating and is associated with mutual acceptance and a positive body image. Nudity within Freikörperkultur is based on body acceptance, freedom, and connection with nature, with no sexual connotation. Being nude on the beach and in water provides a distinct bodily sensation compared to wearing swimsuits, one that is generally perceived as more natural and pleasant. In this context, nudity is perceived as non-sexual and holds no direct connection to sexuality.

In the context of the Freikörperkultur, activities such as bathing, sunbathing at lakes or beaches (often referred to as 'nude beaches'), sports, and other leisure pursuits are traditionally practiced in the nude. The movement is embraced in designated holiday resorts, campsites, country parks, and sports club facilities. While Freikörperkultur shares values with broader naturist and nudist traditions, it is not necessarily organised through national and international associations, and not all participants engage through formal affiliation.

Nudity in intimate or practical contexts—such as showering or using a sauna—is not considered part of Freikörperkultur. These forms of nudity are personal and do not involve collective or cultural consent.

== History ==
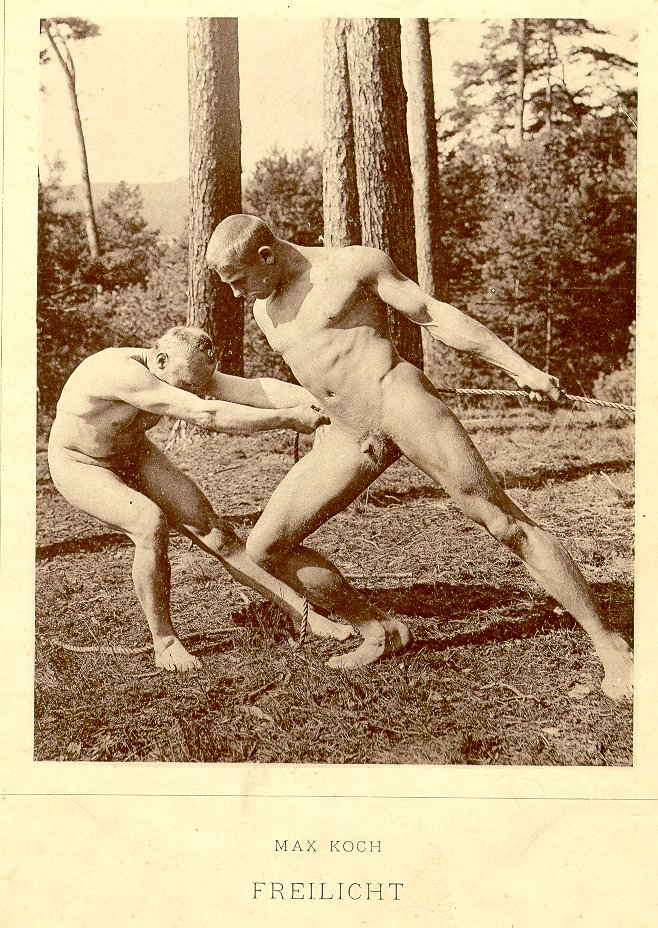
Freilicht (Open-Air) by German painter and photographer Max Friedrich Koch, c. 1894: Early German nudists outdoors engaging in the athletic sport tug of war. One of many themed Freilicht photos by Max Koch depicting nudists outdoors.

The most extensive archive on the historical and contemporary aspects of Freikörperkultur—formerly known as the Damm-Baunatal Collection—is housed in the International Naturist Library at the Lower Saxony Institute for Sports History in Hanover, Germany.

=== Background ===
In public bathhouses, even in the Middle Ages, people bathed in the nude, although moral or medical concerns regarding disease transmission were occasionally expressed. In many parts of central Europe up until the 18th century, people bathed nude in rivers and lakes, often separated by gender. Beginning in the late 18th century, public nudity became increasingly taboo, a trend that was never enforced in the sparsely populated Scandinavia. At the same time, the Scottish judge Lord Monboddo (1714–1779) practiced and preached unclothed "air-baths" for health and as a revival of Ancient Greek attitudes toward nudity. This practice found literary mention in Georg Christoph Lichtenberg's (1742–1799) book Das Luftbad (the air-bath).

As early as 1853, the Swiss naturopath Arnold Rikli founded a "solar sanatorium" (Sonnenheilanstalt) and prescribed his patients the heliotherapy of unclothed outdoor "light-baths" (Lichtbäder) as a treatment for tuberculosis, rickets, seasonal affective disorder, and other health or skin disorders. In 1906, there were also 105 so-called "air-bath" sanatoriums (Luftbäder) in Germany, where unclothed exposure to outdoor air was prescribed to counteract the effects of prolonged confinement in warm, unventilated rooms—conditions thought to cause physiological "softening", heat retention, headaches, nausea, and circulatory disturbances. The idea of the therapeutic unclothed air-bath was connected with that of the light-bath in the early 20th century, for example, by the pastor and naturopath Emanuel Felke.

With the battle cry "Back to Nature," advocates of the nude culture (Nacktkultur) declared war on the compulsory morality of a society that, in their eyes, had become neurotic and sick. "We don't want to deny it: for the people of our time, a naked person is tasteless and looks like a slap in the face - that's how unnatural we have become," wrote Heinrich Pudor in 1893, one of the early pioneers of the free body culture naturist movement in the German Empire.

The painter and social reformer Karl Wilhelm Diefenbach (1851–1913), who practiced Freikörperkultur with his students in the Höllriegelskreuth hermitage near Munich and later on the Himmelhof near Vienna, is considered the true pioneer of naturism, particularly outside of clinical-medical treatments.

=== Nude Culture and the Life Reform (Lebensreform) movement before World War I ===
In 1898, the first official Freikörperkultur association was founded in Essen, Germany. Around 1900, nude bathing in the Berlin area and on the German North and Baltic Sea coasts gained popularity. Before this period, nude bathing at public beaches—or even while wearing the evolving swimsuits of that era—was officially banned or deemed immoral in many places. Consequently, individuals visited beaches and other bathing areas fully clothed in their everyday attire, with men wearing suit-like clothing, women donning long dresses and hats, and children similarly dressed, adhering to contemporary norms of propriety and respectability in the late 19th and early 20th centuries.

The first official Freikörperkultur association in Germany was founded in 1898 in the Ruhr area, although the centre of nude bathing has always been on the coast and around the liberal, adventurous Berlin.

With political liberalization, conservative circles challenged nude bathing, which had become popular among urban intellectuals, viewing it as a corruption of morality.

=== Naturism in the interwar years (between World War I and World War II) ===
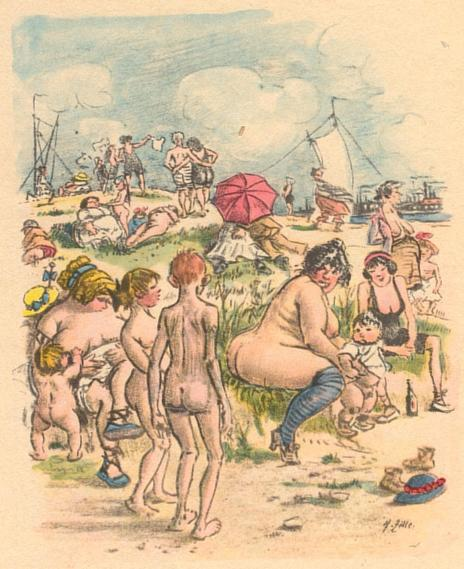
Illustration by caricaturist Heinrich Zille (1858–1929), titled As the outdoor public swimming pool appeared, postcard print, 1919—capturing the growing influence of the Freikörperkultur movement and changing attitudes toward public nudity and body acceptance

After the First World War, Freikörperkultur associations increased in Germany. Following the establishment of the first official nude beach on Sylt Island in 1920, most of the Freikörperkultur associations joined together in 1923 to form the Arbeitsgemeinschaft der Bünde deutscher Lichtkämpfer (Working Group of the Leagues for German Light Campaigners). From 1925, they published a monthly journal in Berlin called "Leben und Sonne" (Life and Sun). In 1926, the working group was renamed the Reichsverband für Freikörperkultur (Imperial Association for Free Body Culture).

The socialist groups united separately under the name Freie Menschen. Bund für sozialistische Lebensgestaltung und Freikörperkultur (Free People. Association for Socialist Lifestyle and Free Body Culture), with approximately 70,000 members in 1932. Among them, Adolf Koch, an educator and advocate for physical and social liberation, played a key role in promoting Freikörperkultur from the 1920s onward. He embraced nudity as a means of fostering health, equality, and progressive education, establishing a network of clothing-free physical education schools—including a large outdoor facility set within nature—that encouraged natural movement, physical well-being, and body confidence.

In 1930, representatives from England, the Netherlands, France, Austria, Switzerland, Hungary, Italy, and Germany met in Frankfurt am Main and later founded a European League for Naturism. The first dissertation about the Freikörperkultur movement was written in the 1930s.

In 1933, after the Nazi Party came to power, nudist organisations were initially banned or integrated into Nazi organisations.

One of the greatest dangers for German culture and morality is the so-called nudity movement. Greatly as it is to be welcomed in the interest of public health, that ever wider circles, especially of the metropolitan population, are striving to make the healing power of sun and air and water serviceable to their body, as greatly must the so-called nudity movement be disapproved of as a cultural error. Among women the nudity kills natural modesty; it takes from men their respect for women and thereby destroys the prerequisite for any genuine culture. It is therefore expected of all police authorities that, in support of the spiritual powers developed through the national movement (Nazism), they take all police measures to destroy the so-called nude culture.

— Hermann Göring, 1933 Nazi edict

On 3 March 1933, the Prussian Ministry of Interior issued a circular to "suppress the nudist movement". However, with the support of Hans Surén (a former German military officer, manager, and instructor at the German Army School of Military Physical Education in Wünsdorf), the Reich Minister of Food and Agriculture Walter Darré, and eventually with the paramilitary SS, Freikörperkultur found new supporters. Some sources state that Himmler and the SS supported naturism. The first naturist Olympic Games took place in Thielle, Switzerland, in August 1939. In the German Reich, the ban on nude bathing was relaxed by the Reich Ordinance of 10 July 1942, provided nobody had to see it. This regulation remained valid in West Germany until the 1960s and in East Germany until 1990. During the National Socialist era, there was also a "racial nude culture," the best-known representative of which was the sports campaigner and author Hans Surén, who glorified the body ideals of the National Socialists and later became an honorary member of the Deutscher Verband für Freikörperkultur (DFK) (German Association for Free Body Culture). In 1940, the first color picture books appeared with depictions of martial nudity, such as the work by the sculptor Arno Breker.

=== From 1945 to present ===
In 1949, the Deutscher Verband für Freikörperkultur (DFK; German Association for Free Body Culture) was founded. Today, it is a member of the German Olympic Sports Confederation (DOSB) with special tasks for popular sports in nude recreation and is the largest member of the International Naturist Federation (INF).

Freikörperkultur-inspired naturism in Germany continued to be particularly popular in East Germany after the Second World War, possibly due to a more secular cultural development. It had ties to the workers' movement and became a symbol for people and families to escape a repressive state. Beach culture was often intermixed – nude and clothed people would swim together, and nudity was widely tolerated and considered neither unusual nor sensational. In the later decades of the 20th century, naturism grew in popularity beyond Germany. During this time, Freikörperkultur—commonly abbreviated as 'FKK'—became widely recognised by its acronym and was adopted in several European countries, influenced by its well-known German origins.

The first naturist holiday resorts were opened around 1950 in France, with Centre-Hélio-Marin in Montalivet-les-Bains, Aquitaine, being one of the earliest examples.

The nude beach in Kampen on the island of Sylt in Germany was particularly popular due to extensive media coverage. FKK resorts in Yugoslavia, France, and on the Baltic Seacoast became popular holiday destinations. Naturist organisations gained many new members in the 1960s.

One popular form of Freikörperkultur recreation is Nacktwanderung, translated as "nude hiking", where a walking group collectively tours through the open countryside. This is possible in Germany due to the liberal laws on non-sexual public nudity. This attitude does extend to Austria, where FKK culture enjoys a high degree of public acceptance, but not to the German-speaking cantons of Switzerland, where nude recreation is usually regulated to designated FKK outdoor public spaces.

Freikörperkultur remains practiced today through organized naturist associations, designated beaches, and nude hiking routes in Germany, with recent DFK reports noting the continued expansion of Nacktwanderwege and ongoing public naturist activities.

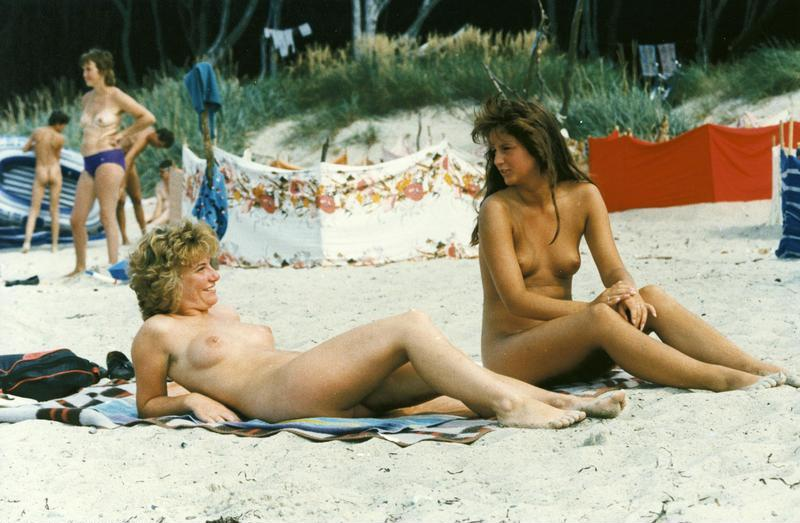
Young East German women at a naturist beach in Rostock, 1988

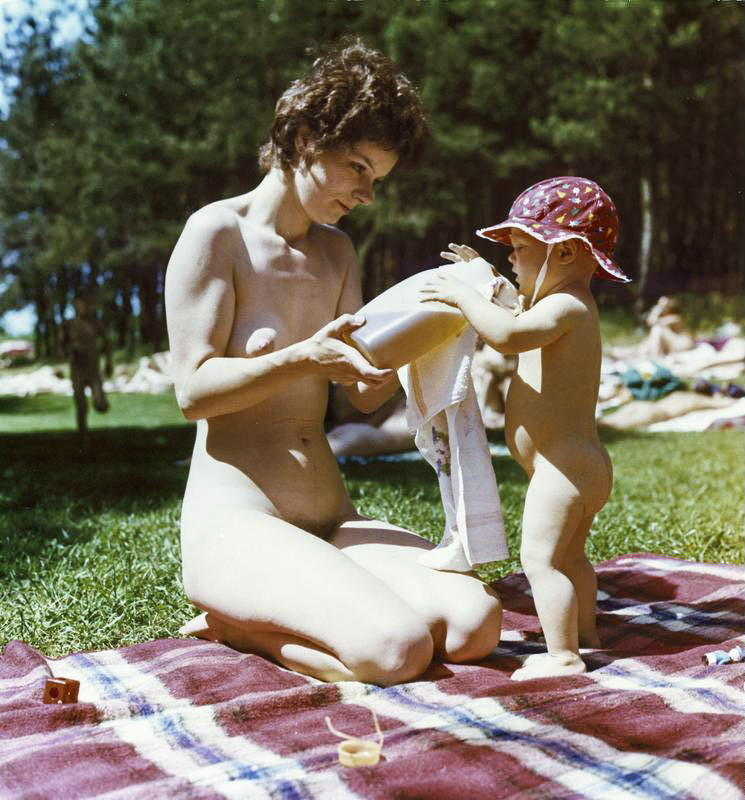
At the Herzsprung naturist FKK lake park in Brandenburg state, Germany; one of the most popular FKK bathing parks in the Angermünde district. Photo dated August 1983.

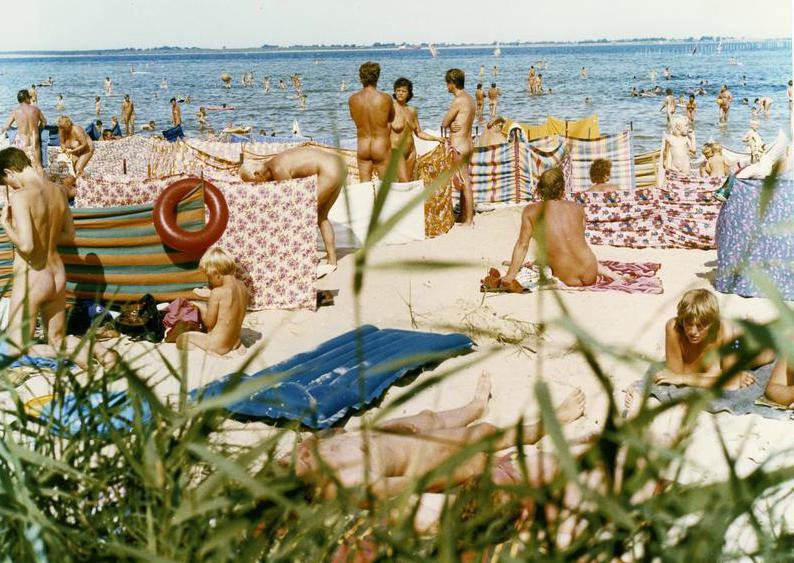
East German nude beach at the Bay of Wismar, 1984

== Switzerland ==
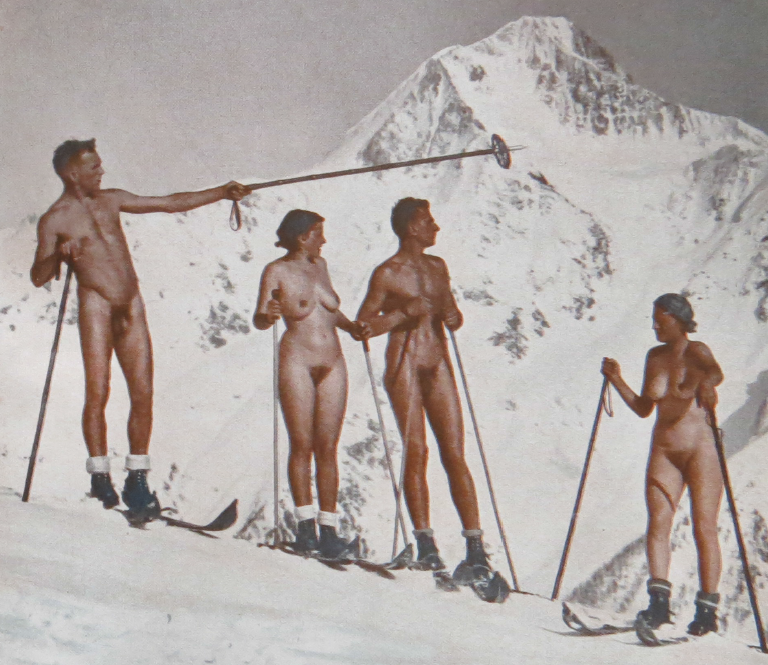
Freikörperkultur skiing in the Swiss Alps. From the Swiss Freikörperkultur-magazine "die neue zeit" (the new times), 1930

In general, public nudity is not forbidden in Switzerland: there is no national law against leaving the house without clothes, as long as the nudity is not sexually motivated. However, the jurisprudence in Switzerland varies from canton to canton. In response to an influx of German FKK enthusiasts crossing the Alps, the Swiss canton of Appenzell Innerrhoden, which became a popular destination for its tourist hiking trails, passed a local act in 2009 explicitly prohibiting nude hiking in outdoor public spaces. Local regulatory authorities imposed fines of 200 Swiss francs for "being naked in public", which some nude ramblers refused to pay. While there are only a few beaches where FKK is officially tolerated in Switzerland (e.g. Katzensee near Zurich), public saunas are generally visited nude.

Two avid nude ramblers from the neighbouring Swiss canton of Appenzell Ausserrhoden, where there is no strict ban on nude hiking, appealed the fines at the Federal Supreme Court of Switzerland, but the case was dismissed in 2011 with the verdict "The cantons can fine naked hikers. It is true that nude hiking is not covered by the penal code. But the cantons are authorized to ban and punish non-sexually motivated nudity."

In a 2012 protest event covered by Swiss news reporters, a naked 28-year-old Austrian broke away from his paragliding tandem partner around 700 meters above the ground and landed with his parachute in Wasserauen (Appenzell Innerrhoden), the faces of the naturist flyer and his helper, the Swiss "nude alpine hiking professional" known by the pseudonym Puistola Grottenpösch (with a fig leaf) who is also considered the mouthpiece of Swiss nude hikers, were made unrecognisable in the press coverage; no complaint was filed, said the Appenzell Innerrhoden public prosecutor. The man would be fined if we found out who he was. Since the Federal Supreme Court of Switzerland verdict, the Swiss canton of Appenzell Innerrhoden has seen no more trace of nude hikers.

== See also ==
- Adolf Koch – early pioneer of the German Freikörperkultur movement
- Bess Mensendieck – early pioneer of the German feminist Freikörperkultur movement
- Indiaca – the FKK Indiaca/Peteca sport tournament in Germany
- List of social nudity places in Europe
- Lotte Herrlich (1883–1956) – regarded as the most important female photographer of German naturism
- Nude recreation
- Richard Ungewitter – early pioneer of the German Freikörperkultur movement
