= Lebensreform =

Social movement in German-speaking lands around the turn of the twentieth century

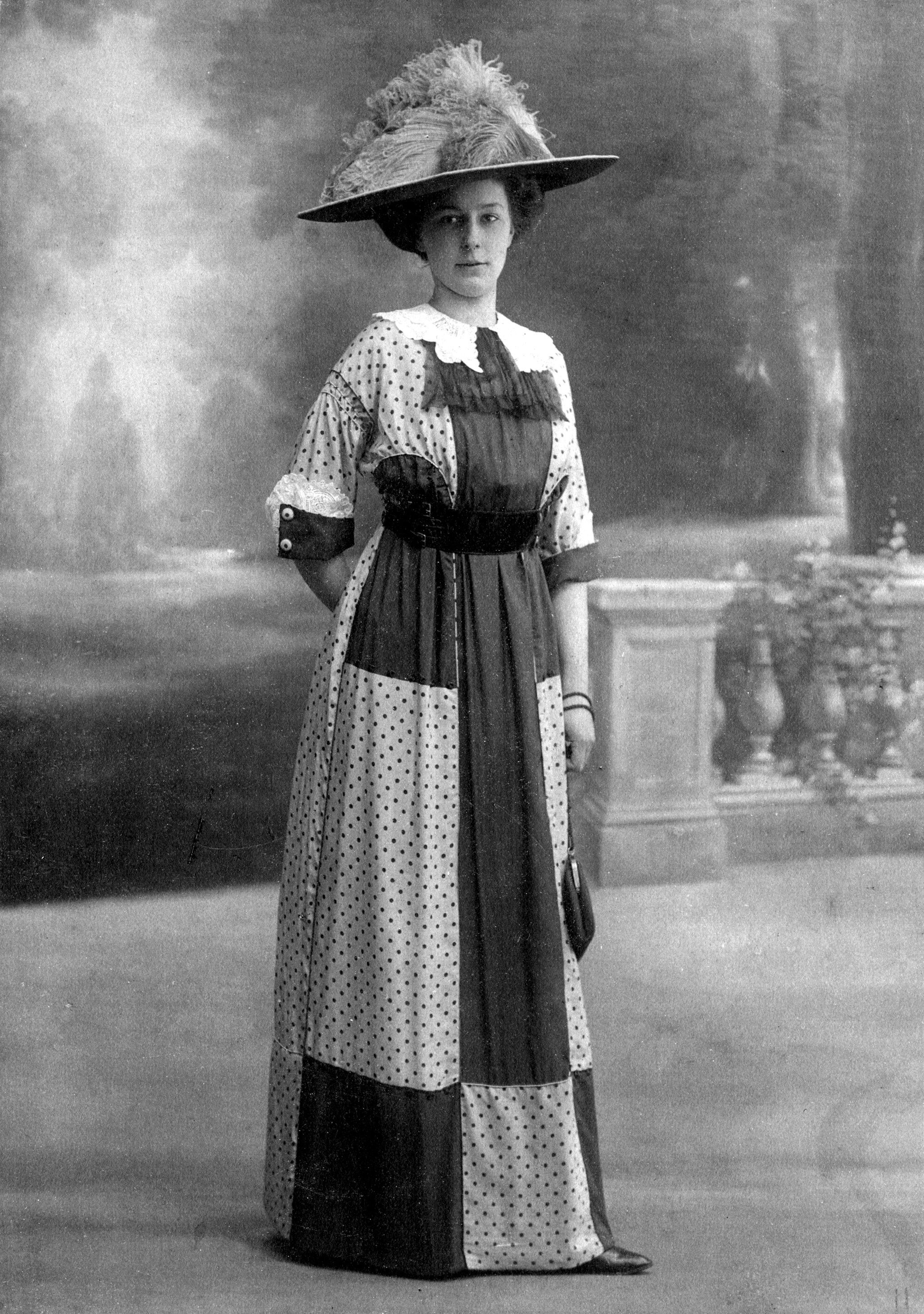
One significant aspect of the Lebensreform movement was the promotion of healthy reform clothing. This 1911 photograph depicts a woman wearing a dress in the so-called reform style, characterised by the absence of a tight-laced corset.

Lebensreform (German pronunciation: [ˈleːbn̩sˌʁeˈfɔʁm]; 'life reform' in English) is a German term that serves as an umbrella for various social reform movements that have emerged since the mid-19th century, particularly originating from Germany and Switzerland. In their early days, these movements were predominantly supported by the burgher class (Bürgerstand, urban residents), particularly the urban intellectuals, and were characterised by common features such as the critique of industrialisation, materialism, and urbanisation, coupled with a desire to return to a natural state of living.

The objectives of Lebensreform included the promotion of a natural and healthy lifestyle to counter the detrimental effects of these factors on health and overall well-being. Common practices associated with the movement encompassed vegetarianism (advocating for a diet free of meat, typically motivated by ethical, health, and environmental reasons), naturopathy (the use of natural remedies for healing), naturism (embracing natural environments and was closely associated with the Freikörperkultur movement, which promoted the benefits of unclothed exposure to natural elements such as sunlight, fresh air, and water), physical fitness and posture care through gymnastics and expressionist dance, and clothing reform aimed at promoting more natural and comfortable attire.

The Lebensreform movement has had a lasting effect on several aspects of modern life, influencing contemporary health and wellness practices. Other elements associated with the Lebensreform movement included:

- Hydrotherapy: The use of water for therapeutic purposes, including baths, saunas, and cold water treatments.
- Sunbathing: Advocating for the health benefits of sunlight, which was seen as essential for physical and mental well-being.
- Organic farming: The promotion of organic agriculture and gardening practices to ensure healthier food production and consumption.
- Alternative medicine: The use of non-conventional medical treatments, including naturopathy, herbal medicine, and homeopathy.
- Spiritual and religious practices: Some aspects of Lebensreform included a return to nature-based spirituality and alternative religious practices that emphasised harmony with nature, such as yoga.
- Environmental conservation: A focus on protecting natural environments and promoting sustainable living practices.
- Art and architecture: Influences on art and architecture that emphasised natural forms, simplicity, and functionality, such as the Jugendstil (Art Nouveau) movement.
- Education reform: Progressive educational practices that promoted physical activity, creativity, and holistic development in children.
- Community living: The establishment of intentional communities and communes that practiced the principles of Lebensreform in everyday life.

While these diverse movements did not coalesce into a single overarching organisation, they were marked by the presence of numerous associations.

Whether the reform movements of the Lebensreform should be classified as modern or as anti-modern and reactionary is controversial. Both theses have been defended.

The painter and social reformer Karl Wilhelm Diefenbach is considered an important pioneer of the Lebensreform ideas. Other influential proponents included Sebastian Kneipp, Louis Kuhne, Hugo Höppener (Fidus), Gustav Gräser, and Adolf Just.

One noticeable legacy of the Lebensreform movement in Germany today is the Reformhaus ("reform house"), which are retail stores that sell organic food and naturopathic medicine.

== History ==
The Lebensreform movement in Germany was a politically diverse social reform movement. There were hundreds of groups across Germany dedicated to some or all of the concepts associated with the Lebensreform movement. Representatives of the Lebensreform propagated a natural way of life with ecology and organic farming, a vegetarian diet without alcoholic beverages and tobacco smoking, German dress reform, and naturopathy. In doing so, they reacted to what they saw as the negative consequences of social changes in the 19th century.

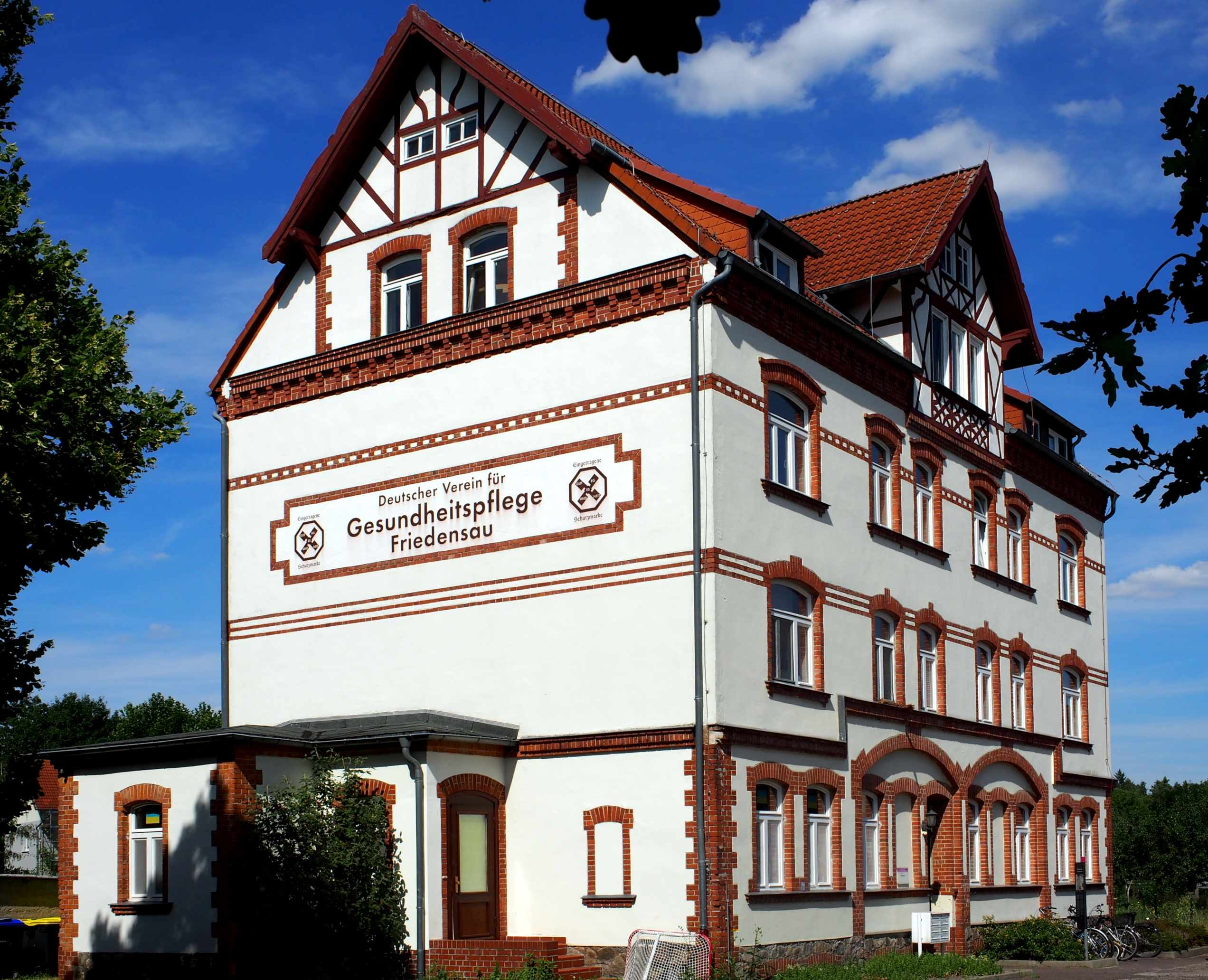
The German Association for Health Care (DVG; Deutscher Verein für Gesundheitspflege), founded in 1899 in Friedensau, followed the ideas of the Lebensreform movement from a religious (Adventist) motivation. As an umbrella organisation and sponsoring association for health institutions of German Adventism, it is one of the oldest German associations dedicated to health promotion.

Spiritually, the Lebensreform turned to new religious and spiritual views, including theosophy, Mazdaznan, and yoga. Many late neo-romanticism elements were also taken up, along with a glorification of the "simple life in the country". Dozens of magazines, journals, books, and pamphlets were published on these topics. The Lebensreform movement encompassed a wide spectrum of ideological affiliations. While some groups were rooted in socialist ideals, others maintained an apolitical stance, and several adopted right-wing or nationalist perspectives.

The architectural form of the Lebensreform first emerged from settlement experiments such as Monte Verità. Later, it influenced the garden city movement, including the Hellerau settlement and many others. The best-known representative of this movement was the reform architect Heinrich Tessenow (1876–1950), and the Bauhaus. The first establishment of a vegetarian settlement in Germany was the Vegetarian Fruit-Growing Colony Eden (Vegetarische Obstbau-Kolonie Eden) in Oranienburg near Berlin in 1893, formed by some 18 vegetarians from Berlin. It was later named the Eden Fruit-Growing Cooperative Settlement (Eden Gemeinnützige Obstbau-Siedlung).

Lebensreform was a movement primarily dominated by the burgher class (urban residents), with significant participation from women. In the body culture (Körperkultur), it aimed to provide people with plenty of fresh air and sun to compensate for the effects of industrialization and urbanization.

Some areas of the Lebensreform movement, such as naturopathy or vegetarianism, were organized in associations and enjoyed great popularity, as reflected in their membership numbers. To disseminate their content and principles, they published magazines such as Der Naturarzt (The Naturopath) and Die Vegetarische Warte (The Vegetarian Observer). The movement also included freikörperkultur (free body culture; also known as naturism), physical culture, gymnastics, expressionist dance, and posture care, as advocated by Bess Mensendieck. By the 1920s, Germany had even produced a cinematic cultural feature film titled Ways to Strength and Beauty, which promoted and idealized health and beauty in conformity with nature.

One outstanding prophet of the Lebensreform movement was the painter Karl Wilhelm Diefenbach (1861–1913), a pacifist and Tolstoyan anarchist who lived with his students in a hermitage in Höllriegelskreuth near Munich and later founded the community Himmelhof near Vienna. Among his disciples were three painters: Hugo Höppener (Fidus), František Kupka, and Gustav Gräser.

In 1900, Gräser became the co-founder and inspiring pioneer of the community Monte Verità near Ascona, Switzerland. Monte Verità attracted many artists from all over Europe, and during World War I, conscientious objectors from Germany and France. Gustav Gräser, a thinker and poet, greatly influenced the German Youth Movement and such writers as Hermann Hesse and Gerhart Hauptmann. He was the model for the master figures in the books of Hermann Hesse.

Richard Ungewitter and Heinrich Pudor were also well-known advocates of a strain of Lebensreform that emphasized nude culture (Nacktkultur) and was explicitly Völkisch in tradition, which eventually became the Freikörperkultur movement. The Freikörperkultur movement eventually broadened and came to include socialists with no strains of ethnic nationalism, like the educationalist and gymnastics teacher Adolf Koch.

== Connections to Nazi ideology ==
A specific stream based on völkisch Romanticism gradually became part of Nazi ideology by the 1930s, known as blood and soil. As early as 1907, Richard Ungewitter published a pamphlet called Wieder nacktgewordene Menschen (Become-naked-again People), which sold 100,000 copies. He argued that the practices he recommended would be "the means by which the German race would regenerate itself and ultimately prevail over its neighbours and the diabolical Jews, who were intent on injecting putrefying agents into the nation's blood and soil".

The Nationalist physician Artur Fedor Fuchs began the League for Freikörperkultur (free body culture), giving public lectures on the healing powers of the sun in the "Nordic sky", which "alone strengthened and healed the warrior nation". Ancient forest living and habits presumed to have been followed by the ancient tribes of Germany were considered beneficial to regenerating the Aryan people, according to Fuchs' philosophy.

Hans Sùren, a prominent former military officer and sports instructor, published Man and the Sun (1924), which sold 240,000 copies; by 1941 it was reissued in 68 editions. Sùren promoted the Aryan master race concept of physically strong, militarized men who would be the "salvation" of the German people.

== Effect in the United States ==
Some of the less well-known protagonists of the movement in Germany, such as William Pester, Benedict Lust, and Arnold Ehret, emigrated to California at the end of the 19th and until the mid-20th century, where they strongly influenced the later hippie movement. One group, calling themselves the "Nature Boys", settled as a commune in the California desert. One member of this group, eden ahbez, wrote the song Nature Boy, recorded in 1947 by Nat King Cole, popularizing the "back-to-nature" movement in mainstream America. Eventually, a few of these Nature Boys, including Gypsy Boots, made their way to Northern California in 1967, taking part in the Summer of Love in San Francisco.

== Today ==
Many contemporary environmental and other movements, such as the organic food movement, various fad diets, "back to nature" movements, as well as "folk movements", have their roots in the Lebensreform movement's emphasis on the goodness of nature, the harms caused by industrialization to society, people, and nature, the importance of the whole person—body and mind—and the goodness of "the old ways".

== Comparison of Lebensreform with other social movements ==
The German researcher Joachim Raschke compared the Lebensreform to other social movements and identified some specific characteristics:

- The workers' movement was a mass movement interested in power politics and only secondarily in sociocultural issues.
- After 1968, Germany (and other countries) saw the growth of the so-called New Social Movements such as the students' movement, the peace movement, and the movement of the modern environmentalists. Those movements lacked a unified ideology, had no tight organization, and were very diverse. Their members (not only the leaders) were highly educated, which was a result of the expansion of the German educational system in the 1960s. Typical for these movements was a certain enmity towards "leaders" and a preference for direct action, although these movements often changed the way they expressed themselves.
- The Lebensreform movements were much smaller groups that consisted often of academics. They had experienced an estrangement in modern society and tried to realign mankind and nature. They usually organized themselves in a traditional way, with lectures, clubs, and magazines.

== Books that influenced Lebensreform ==
- Just, Adolf (1903) [1896]. Return to Nature: Paradise Regained. Translated by Lust, Benedict. New York: Benedict Lust. ISBN 9780787304850. Also available as a PDF from the Soil and Health Library
- Richard Ungewitter: Nakedness (1904), ISBN 0-9652085-1-6
- Arnold Ehret: Mucusless Diet Healing System (1922), ISBN 0-87904-004-1 — PDF
- Hermann Hesse: Siddhartha (1922)

== See also ==
- Agrarianism
- Anarcho-naturism
- Anarcho-primitivism
- Back-to-the-land movement
- Bioregionalism
- Commune (intentional community)
- Communitarianism
- Deindustrialization
- Down to the Countryside Movement
- Ecovillage
- German utopian communities
- Green anarchism
- History of the hippie movement
- Localism
- Neo-Tribalism
- Physiocracy
- Permaculture
- Plain people
- Renewable energy
- Rural flight
- Self-sufficiency
- Simple living
- Subsistence agriculture
- Survivalism
- Sustainability
- Sustainable development
- Sustainable living
- Tolstoyan movement
- Wandervogel movement
- Lebensphilosophie

== Bibliography ==
- Thorsten Carstensen & Marcel Schmid: Die Literatur der Lebensreform. Kulturkritik und Aufbruchstimmung um 1900. Bielefeld: transcript Verlag, 2016, 352 pp., ISBN 978-3-8376-3334-4
- Gordon Kennedy: Children of the Sun: A Pictorial Anthology From Germany To California 1883–1949. Nivaria Press (1998), 192 pp., ISBN 0-9668898-0-0
- Gordon, Mel (2006). Voluptuous Panic: The Erotic World of Weimar Berlin. Feral House. ISBN 1-932595-11-2.
- John Williams: Turning to Nature in Germany: Hiking, Nudism, and Conservation, 1900–1940. Stanford University Press (2007), 368 pp., ISBN 0-8047-0015-X
- Martin Green: Mountain of Truth. The Counterculture begins, Ascona, 1900-1920. University Press of New England, Hanover and London, 1986, 287 pp., ISBN 0-87451-365-0
- Friedhelm Kirchfeld & Wade Boyle: Nature Doctors. Pioneers in Naturopathic Medicine. Portland, Oregon,1994, 351 pp., ISBN 0-9623518-5-7
