= Lotte Herrlich =

German photographer of the nude human form (1883–1956)

- Born: Olga Clara Katharina Herrlich; 1883; Chemnitz, German Empire
- Died: 1956 (aged 72–73); Eutin, West Germany
- Known for: Photography
- Movement: Freikörperkultur

Lotte Herrlich (1883–1956) was a German photographer. She is regarded as the most important female photographer of the German naturism. This mainly was during the 1920s, in which the Freikörperkultur (Free Body Culture) was popular within Germany, before the Nazi Party assumed power (1930s), promptly prohibiting it.

== Life ==
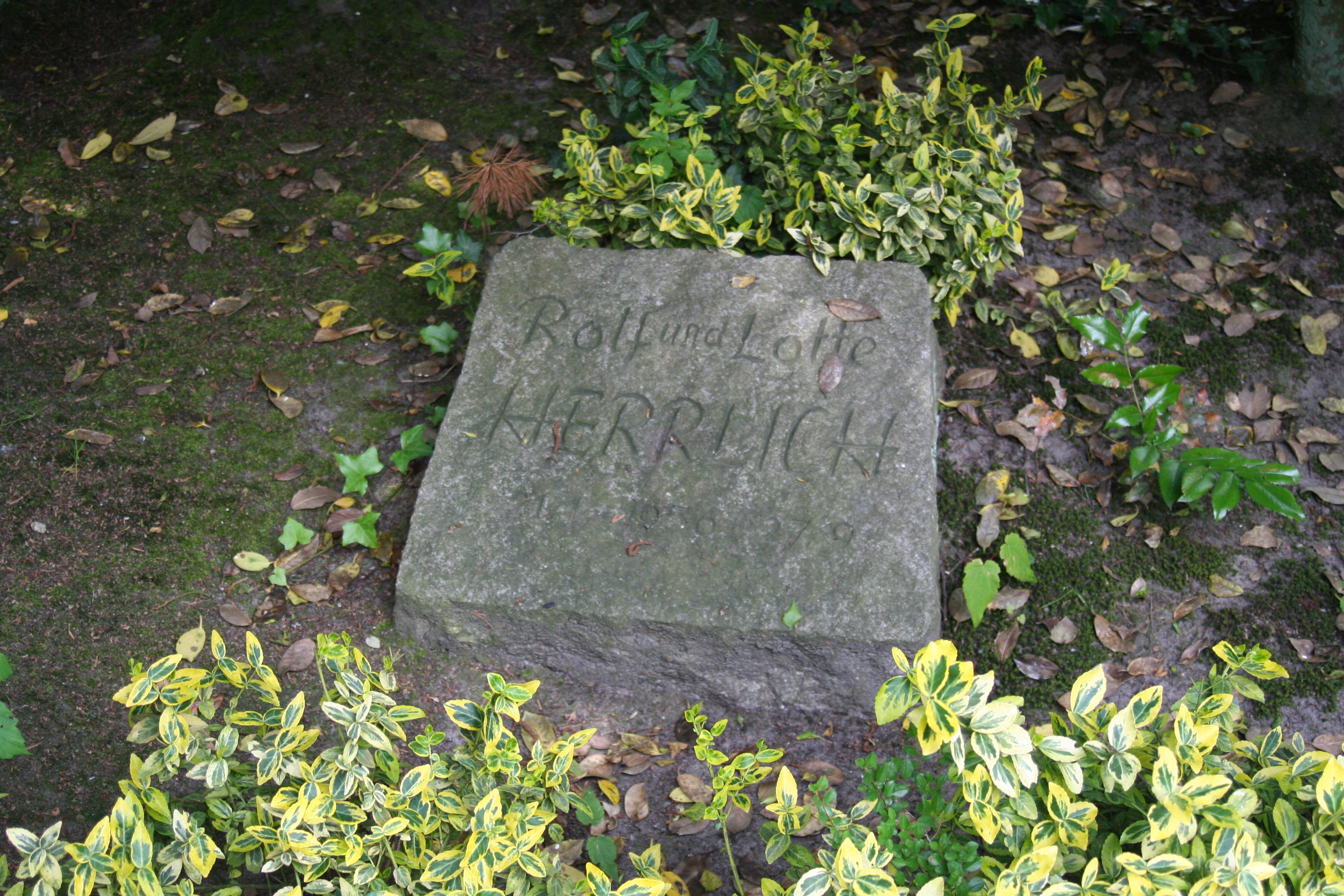
Lotte Herrlich's grave

Lotte Herrlich was born as Olga Clara Katharina Herrlich, at Chemnitz, in 1883. She spent most of her life in Hamburg.

Lotte Herrlich began in photography after her son Rolf was born. She started doing family photographs and child portraits for a pastime. Then she continued her self-taught art with portraits and landscapes, nevertheless Lotte found herself particularly engrossed through the years, for portraying the physical development of her son with a collection of naturist photographs. Lotte Herrlich's intense interest of naturistic photography so awoke.

Such work was discovered by the Naturistenzeitschrift Die Schönheit (The Beauty, nudist magazine), and it then published Lotte Herrlich's ensuing production: a thousand photographs of children, nine hundred of poses, and still some photographs of landscapes too.

Lotte Herrlich shot her naturist and conventional studio photographs mostly within two improvised rooms inside her small home of Hamburg, exploiting lighting and simple furniture, and so portraying the nude bodies, which were mostly of female models. The poses always were calm, ordinary-world scenes, whereas the models seemed resting, instead of posing. Karl Toepfer wrote: "In her interior shots, Herrlich avoided altogether the secretive atmosphere of the studio, the pose, and the cosmetic artifice, with the result that the naked body appeared as an extension of nature into the timeless bourgeois home."

Lotte Herrlich's naturism belonged amongst the Freikörperkultur (Free Body Culture, FKK) movement. Such nudity ideals were quite popular particularly in Germany, with its many associations, although this would last until about 1933, when the assuming Nazi regime dissolved them.

Until then, Herrlich's work was featured in short lived magazines; Mann Und Weib (Man and woman) and Urania are examples. Her books of naturism were published mainly during the 1920s. The physical development of her son Rolf was captured in thirty pictures that were also published in the 1920s. He would become a professional photographer of nudism too. The two volumes of Seliges Nacktsein (1927) are collection of adolescent nudes. Alessandro Bertolotti wrote: "The cover of the second volumes shows a boy and two girls, hand in hand and dancing a joyful farandole, suggesting – by fluid, undulating outlines similar to those of the bacchic dancers of Jugendstil – the ideal of a fraternal friendship in perfect accord with German sensibility".

Lotte Herrlich's production was broader actually, producing other conventional portraits, of clad people, landscapes, domestic animals, and even dolls, and her work can be found in publications of even after the Second War. Particularly, since the 1930s and until the end of her professional career Lotte Herrlich photographed nude children (Kinderkarte), mainly for divers collections of postcards (Kinderköpfe), whose printing was resumed after the war, during the 1950s.

Lotte Herrlich died at Eutin, in 1956.

== Selected works ==
- "Edle Nacktheit" (1920). Twenty pictures of nude women.
- "Rolf" (1924). Thirty shots of Lotte Herrlich's growing son.
- "Neue Aktstudien" (1924). Twelve pictures of naturism.
- "Seliges Nacktsein" (1927).
- "Der schöne nackte Mensch, Bd. 1: Das Weib" (The beautiful naked person, vol 1: The woman. 1928).
- "Der weibliche Akt" (1928). Pictures of women.

== See also ==
- Freikörperkultur
