= Richard Ungewitter =

German writer and naturism advocate

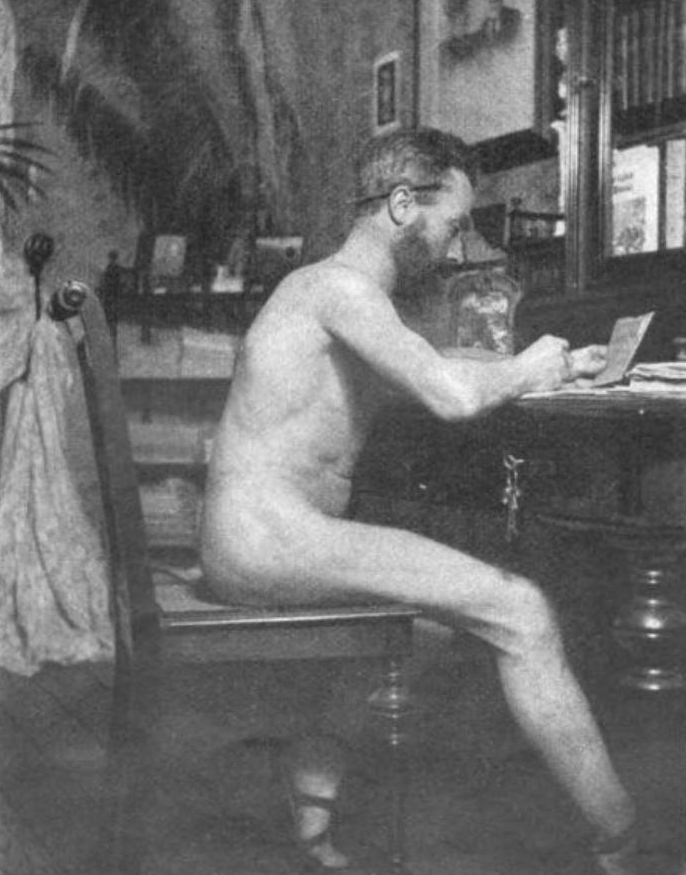
- Born: December 18, 1869; Artern, Province of Saxony, Prussia
- Died: December 17, 1958 (aged 88); Stuttgart, West Germany
- Occupation: Naturist

Richard Ungewitter (December 18, 1869 – December 17, 1958) was a German naturist and pioneer of the Freikörperkultur (free body culture) movement and one of its first organizers. There was a Völkisch element in Ungewitter's ideas.

== Career ==
Ungewitter was of working-class or lower middle-class origins and was trained as a gardener. (Note: Working class according to Ross (2005, p. 32). Hau (2003, pp. 23, 29) points to his claim to have been born into the Bürgertum (middle class) as a likely exaggeration given his early training.) He became a clerk in the office of a gardening company, then lived for two years in Norway. After returning to Germany, he was one of the founders of a bread manufacturing facility. After that went bankrupt, he worked as a sales representative and a Lutheran minister.

He was introduced to nudism (now known as naturism) by Heinrich Pudor, who published under the pseudonym Heinrich Scham (Shame). Today he is considered one of its early pioneers.

In 1903, Ungewitter published a booklet entitled Wieder nacktgewordene Menschen (People naked again), which made him quite well known. Almost 100,000 copies were printed within a few years. His first book, Die Nacktheit (Nudity) appeared in 1906 under the full title Die Nacktheit in entwicklungsgeschichtlicher, gesundheitlicher, moralischer und künstlerischer Sicht (Nudity from the point of view of historical development, health, morality and art). It was reprinted several times. Repeated attempts at legal procedures against the book failed because the experts invited by the court testified in favor of Ungewitter. For example, Theodor Lipps, a professor at the Ludwig-Maximilians-Universität München, stated in his report:

The movement focused on Nudity is now a widespread one and has a well justified basis, as such movements do as a rule. German: Die auf Nacktkultur zielende Bewegung ist jetzt eine weit verzweigte und hat, wie solche Bewegungen in der Regel, einen wohlberechtigten Kern

In subsequent years, Ungewitter published further books advocating nudism. His best known work is the book Nackt (Naked), which appeared in 1908. In addition, in 1908 he founded the Vereinigung für hygienische, ethische und ästhetische Kultur (Organization for hygienic, ethical and aesthetic culture). This was the second naturist group in Germany, after a club founded in Essen in 1898, and had approximately 50 members, primarily in South Germany.

Both Nackt and his Nacktheit und Kultur (Nudity and Culture, published 1911) were the subject of legal disputes lasting several years, in which, however, he was largely able to obtain satisfactory judgements. (Note: The obscenity case over Nacktheit und Kultur lasted two years, but Ungewitter was acquitted.) (Note: Ross (2005, p. 45) points out that our information on these cases comes primarily from Ungewitter's own summaries in later books.) Thus, in its session of April 24, 1912, Criminal Trial Chamber III of the Royal Regional Court in Stuttgart rejected the suit by the royal attorneys to suppress Nackt. This legal opinion of the court, under which illustrated naturist publications are permissible, was followed by all other democratic courts of justice in Germany and other countries.

Ungewitter, like many Lebensreform theorists of the time, ascribed positive health benefits to nudity. He suggested that wearing clothing might be a cause of tuberculosis, and theorized that the rays of the sun were beneficial to health because they contained metals. By his own account, he had suffered from infections, weakness, and a recurring rash despite medical treatment, and only become healthy and strong after, under the influence of Louis Kuhne's theories, he gave up alcohol and smoking and became a vegetarian; ultimately he adopted a raw food diet in addition to exercising and writing in the nude.

Ungewitter founded his first organization, the Vereinigung für hygienische, ethische und ästhetische Kultur (Society for Hygienic, Ethical and Esthetic Culture) in Stuttgart around 1906. In 1907 Ungewitter founded the Loge des aufsteigenden Lebens (Lodge of Ascending Life or Rising Life), (Note: Williams (2007, p. 26) gives the year as 1909, the same year as Pudor's Freyabund (Freyja League).) to which according to his statement on June 17, 1912, more than 800 people belonged. It may have been the first nationwide nudist organization in Germany. In its regular publication Vertrauliche Mitteilungen (Confidential Reports), members advocated naked bathing free of embarrassment, nudity without being disturbed, and to some extent, long-distance nude hiking. In 1914 the name of the lodge was changed to Treubund für aufsteigendes Leben (Brotherhood or Loyalty Club for Ascending Life, abbreviated Tefal).

In 1923, Ungewitter, who dominated the organization, obtained an amendment to its constitution introducing a commitment to "racial hygiene" (völkisch eugenics) and also requiring a commitment to a political party. Many members objected to the alignment with eugenics, and large numbers therefore left the organization, which subsequently waned in importance. However, the move toward eugenics did not constitute an essential change in his theories. As early as 1910, he had written in Nacktheit und Kultur:

If every German woman saw a naked Germanic man more often, so many would not run after exotic alien races ... for the sake of healthy reproductive selection I therefore demand nudism, so that the strong and healthy will mate, but weaklings will not succeed in reproducing.German: Würde jedes deutsche Weib öfter einen nackten germanischen Mann sehen, so würden nicht so viele exotischen fremden Rassen nachlaufen […] Aus Gründen der gesunden Zuchtwahl forde ich deshalb die Nacktkultur, damit Starke und Gesunde sich paaren, Schwächlinge aber nicht zur Vermehrung kommen.

— Ungewitter (1913, p. 130); also referenced in Hau (2003, p. 85) (Note: See also the racialist prescriptions quoted by Williams (2007, p. 27))

Ungewitter was specifically antisemitic, (Note: Hau (2003, p. 189) refers to him as a "rabid anti-Semite".) and was also associated with the Völkisch journal Die Ostara. He was a member of several antisemitic organizations, including the Reichshammerbund, the Deutschvölkischer Schutz- und Trutzbund and the Verband gegen die Überhebung des Judentums (Association Against the Arrogance of Judaism).. Ungewitter was unusual among naturists in making a close connection between nudism, marriage, and racialism, and advocated compulsory nudity (nude exercises three times a day) together with vegetarianism. In 1919, he had edited Der Zusammenbruch: Deutschlands Wiedergeburt durch Blut und Eisen, which lays out a program for Germany's recovery from the defeat of World War I in which compulsory nudity is an element.

Ungewitter was also notably anti-feminist, arguing that girls should be educated only in things that would equip them to run a household and that they should be required to undergo a year's service including physical exercise, and notably hostile toward the rich, whom he attacked for "status arrogance" that extended to preferring fashionable ailments to health.

After the Nazis came to power, Ungewitter did not find the expected support for his ideas. There was an initial crackdown on nudists in 1933, then those who advocated recreational nudity were accommodated, but Ungewitter, with his pronounced anti-urbanism and advocacy of rural naturist settlements (at least two Tefal settlements existed by the mid-1920s), was forced out. In 1938, he was sidelined with an honorary post. He died in Stuttgart in December 1958, in the evening before his 89th birthday.

== Vegetarianism ==
Ungewitter became a vegetarian for health reasons and credited the diet with healing a rash on his face. His diet became more restricted over time as he removed eggs, milk and all cooked food from his diet. As a Rohkostler (raw foodist) he only consumed raw plant foods. He performed gymnastic exercises and worked nude at his desk, believing that clothing prevented expulsion of autotoxins from the body.

== Awards and honors ==
- 1953 Honorary Membership in the Deutscher Verband für Freikörperkultur (German Association for Free Body Culture)

== Works ==
as author

- Wieder nackt gewordene Menschen, 1903
- Die Nacktheit, 1905. Trans. Tessa Wilson. Nakedness: In an Historical, Hygienic, Moral and Artistic Light. Riverside, California: Ultraviolet, 2005. ISBN 9780965208512
- Diätische Ketzereien. Die Eiweißtheorie mit ihren Folgen, als Krankheitsursache, und ihre wissenschaftlich begründete Verabschiedung, 1908
- Nackt. Eine kritische Studie, 1909
- Kultur und Nacktheit. Eine Forderung, 1911
- Nacktheit und Kultur. Neue Forderungen [Nudity and Culture. New Claims] (in German). 1913.
- Rassenverschlechterung durch Juda, 1919
- Nacktheit und Aufstieg. Ziele zur Erneuerung des deutschen Volkes, 1920
- Rettung oder Untergang des deutschen Volkes. Nur für Deutschgeborene!, 1921
- Nacktheit und Moral. Wege zur Rettung des deutschen Volkes, 1925
- Aus Entartung zur Rasse-Pflege. Ein Weckruf in zwölfter Stunde, 1934
- Denkschrift zur Impfung, 1938

as editor

- Die Nacktheit in entwicklungsgeschichtlicher, gesundheitlicher, moralischer und künstlicher Beleuchtung [The developmental history of nudity in an Historical, Hygienic, Moral and Artistic Light] (in German). Cologne: Deutscher Ärzte-Verlag. 1979 [1907]. ISBN 3-7691-1904-5.
- Der Zusammenbruch: Deutschlands Wiedergeburt durch Blut und Eisen, 1919

== See also ==
- Lebensreform

== Notes and references ==
- Ross, Chad (2005). Naked Germany: Health, Race and the Nation. Bloomsbury Academic. ISBN 978-1-85973-866-5.
- Hau, Michael (2003). The Cult of Health and Beauty in Germany: A Social History, 1890-1930. University of Chicago Press. ISBN 978-0-226-31974-2.
- Williams, John Alexander (2007). Turning to Nature in Germany: Hiking, Nudism, and Conservation, 1900-1940. Stanford University Press. ISBN 978-0-8047-0015-3.
- Wedemeyer-Kolwe, Bernd (2004). "Der neue Mensch": Körperkultur im Kaiserreich und in der Weimarer Republik (in German). Königshausen & Neumann. ISBN 978-3-8260-2772-7.
- Toepfer, Karl Eric (1997). Empire of Ecstasy: Nudity and Movement in German Body Culture, 1910-1935. University of California Press. ISBN 978-0-520-91827-6.
