= Deutscher Verband für Freikörperkultur =

Nudist organization

Deutscher Verband für Freikörperkultur e.V. (DFK)
- Deutscher Verband für Freikörperkultur (DFK) Verband für Familien-, Breitensport und Naturismus e.V.
- Formation: 1949
- Founded at: Kassel
- Type: Association for family, popular sports and naturism
- Legal status: registered association
- Headquarters: Langenhagen
- Location: Hanover, Germany
- Members: 32,531; includes both direct personal membership and local naturist FKK-associations (2021)
- President: Wilfried Blaschke
- Subsidiaries: 135
- Website: https://www.dfk.org

The Deutscher Verband für Freikörperkultur (DFK; German Association for Free Body Culture) represents the interests of organized supporters of the Freikörperkultur (free body culture) in Germany. The DFK is a member of the German Olympic Sports Confederation (DOSB) as an association with special tasks for popular sports in nude recreation. In addition, the DFK represents its members at the international level in the International Naturist Federation (INF), which also sees itself as representing the interests of non-organized naturists.

== History ==
The DFK was founded in Kassel on 6 November 1949 as the umbrella organization for the then three allied occupied zones in Germany (British, French and American). The entry in the register of associations took place in 1953 at the Hanover District Court.

In 1953, the DFK awarded an honorary membership to one of the pioneers of the Freikörperkultur (FKK) movement, Richard Ungewitter, despite the allegations of eugenics and anti-Semitic activities that had been made against him. Conversely, in 1964, Adolf Koch, the socialist pioneer of Freikörperkultur in the former Weimar Republic, was excluded from the association because Koch's public relations work was considered too aggressive.

In 2007 the DFK threatened to leave the International Naturist Federation (INF). For a number of years before, the DFK had criticized, among others, the INF's alleged misuse of membership fees. After a personal discussion between the associations on 18 August 2007, the DFK remains one of the major net contributors to the INF.

In 2009 the 60th anniversary of the DFK took place in Dresden.

By far the most extensive collection on the historical and current situation of the Freikörperkultur (free body culture), the "International Naturist Library" (formerly the Damm - Baunatal Collection), is located in the Lower Saxony Institute for Sport History in Hanover, Germany.

== FKK-Youth ==
Analogous to the DFK is the "fkk-jugend e.V." (FKK-Youth) sports organization. This independent Freikörperkultur youth sports association is by contract the DFK's youth organization and represents - in addition to its direct members - the interests of around 8,000 children and young people in the DFK associations. The fkk-jugend e.V. has its roots in the German Youth Movement.

== Organization ==
The DFK has its office in Langenhagen, Hanover, Germany.

In addition to the association's president, the Presidium includes a vice-president and one each for sport and finance, as well as a federal chairperson of the FKK-Youth.

== See also ==
- Freikörperkultur
- Naturism in Germany
