= Eden Gemeinnützige Obstbau-Siedlung =

German intentional community

Eden Gemeinnützige Obstbau-Siedlung eG
- Cooperative
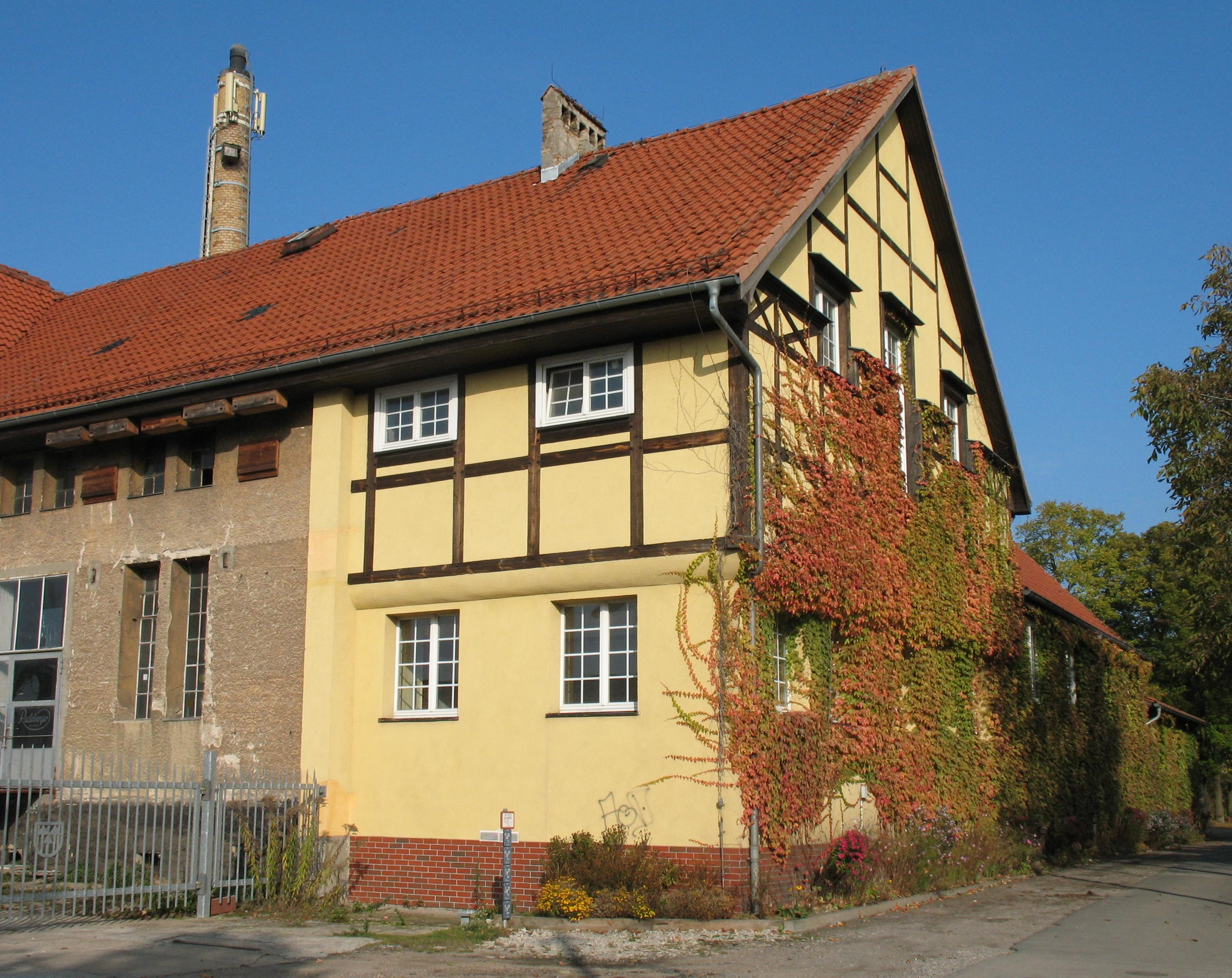
- Old cider brewery

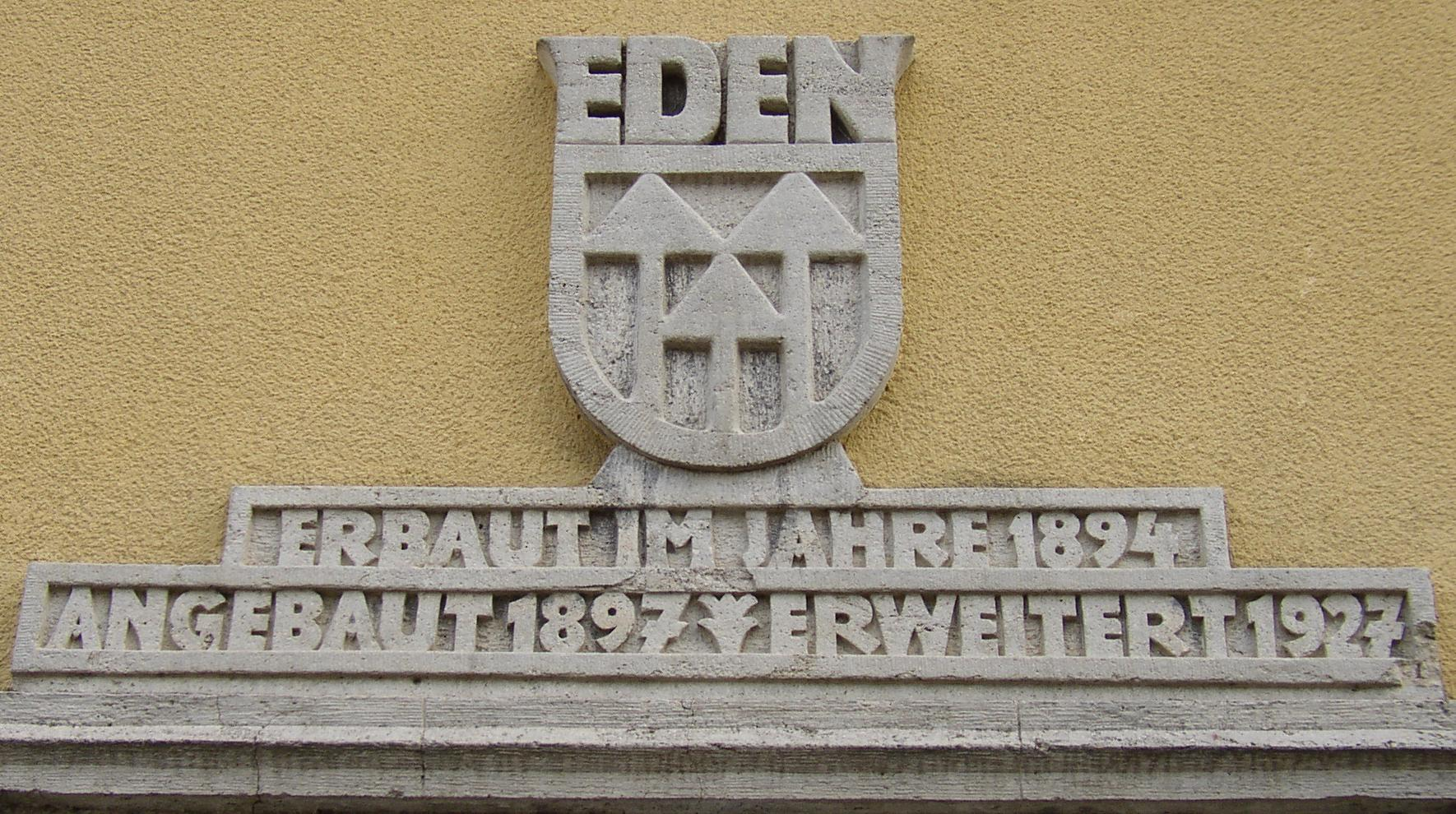
- Flag
- Interactive map of Eden Gemeinnützige Obstbau-Siedlung eG
- Country: Germany
- State: Brandenburg
- District: Oberhavel
- Town: Oranienburg

Area
  - Total: 0.46 sq mi (1.2 km^{2})
- Elevation: 112 ft (34 m)

Population (2008)
  - Total: 1,500
- Time zone: UTC+1 (CET)
  - Summer (DST): UTC+2 (CEST)
- Postal code: 16515
- Area code: 03301
- Website: https://eden-eg.de/

Eden Gemeinnützige Obstbau-Siedlung is a fruit-growing cooperative in Oranienburg north of Berlin. The cooperative was founded in 1893 exclusively for vegetarians but since 1901 has accepted membership for anyone who "adopts a healthy lifestyle".

== History ==
The founding document of Eden was signed on May 28 1893 by 18 Lebensreformers with commercial leadership from Bruno Wilhelmi at the Ceres Inn in Berlin. The cooperative was inspired by Gustav Struve and Eduard Baltzer. It can be seen in the context of rapid population growth, urbanization and subsequent land reform in Germany in the late 19th century. At the time, hundreds of ideologically motivated settlements were created.

After WWI, the settlement attracted and supported völkisch and anti-semitic ideologies. Since 1916 only Germans of aryan ethnicity were allowed to settle in Eden. This policy enabled Eden to continue business unchanged throughout the Nazi-Regime. In 1938 there were 1300 people living in Eden, 395 of which were settlers.

Eden was also able to continue its cooperative in East Germany. Produce was sold to West-Germans under the brand name Eden through a daughter company Eden-Waren in Bad Soden am Taunus. The revenue from these products contributed significantly to Edens economic survival. However, the business was collectivised by the state in 1972.

The brand name was sold after the Fall of the Berlin Wall in 1990. It belonged to Novartis until 1999, Deutscher Verein für Gesundheitspflege until 2014 and is currently owned by Hügli Holding.

== Notable inhabitants ==
- Adolf Damaschke (1865–1935), politician and economist
- Silvio Gesell (1862–1930), economist, entrepreneur, and social reformer
- Wilhelm Groß (Künstler) (1883–1974), sculptor and preacher
- Carl Gustav Hempel (1905–1997), philosopher, logician, and epistemologist
- Karl Klindworth (1830–1916), composer, conductor, music educator and pianist
- Gustav Lilienthal (1849–1933), engineer, erected several buildings in Eden
- Winifred Wagner (1897–1980), daughter-in-law of Richard Wagner

== Bibliography ==
- Keil, Gundolf (2015). "Vegetarisch". Medizinhistorische Mitteilungen. Zeitschrift für Wissenschaftsgeschichte und Fachprosaforschung. 34: 29–68.
- Feuchter-Schawelka, Anne (1998). "Siedlungs- und Landkommune-Bewegung". In Kerbs, Diethart; Reulecke, Jürgen (eds.). Handbuch der deutschen Reformbewegungen 1880-1933. Wuppertal: Peter Hammer Verlag. pp. 227–244. ISBN 3-87294-787-7.
- Jütte, Robert (1996). Geschichte der Alternativen Medizin. Von der Volksmedizin zu den unkonventionellen Therapien von heute. Beck.
- Conti, Christoph (1984). Abschied vom Bürgertum. Alternative Bewegungen in Deutschland von 1890 bis heute (in German). Reinbeck.
- Rothschuh, Karl Eduard (1983). Naturheilbewegung, Reformbewegung, Alternativbewegung. Wissenschaftliche Buchgesellschaft.
- Mosse, George L. (2021) [1964]. "Germanic Utopias". The Crisis of German Ideology: Intellectual Origins of the Third Reich. University of Wisconsin Press. pp. 109–126. ISBN 9780299332044.
