= Adolf Koch =

German advocate for nudism in physical education

- Born: 9 April 1897; Berlin, Kingdom of Prussia, German Empire
- Died: 2 July 1970 (aged 74)
- Education: Friedrich Wilhelm University
- Occupations: Educationalist, soldier, combat medic, and sports teacher
- Movement: Freikörperkultur, Lebensreform
- Spouses: Ilka Dieball (m. 1927–1935) Helga Schminke (m. 1948; div. 1950) Irmgard Richter (after 1950)
- Children: 1 son (from second marriage)

Adolf Karl Hubert Koch (9 April 1897, in Berlin – 2 July 1970) was a German educationalist, health professional, and sports teacher, best known for founding a progressive physical education movement during the Weimar Germany period that emphasised natural movement and physical freedom. A prominent advocate of Freikörperkultur (free body culture), a social movement in Germany that gained prominence in the early 20th century and promoted nudity to foster health and body positivity, Koch's work was also integral to the broader Lebensreform movement of the late 19th and early 20th centuries, which aimed to renew society through a return to nature, simplicity, and holistic well-being.

== Education and military service in the First World War ==
Koch's father, Karl Koch, was a trained carpenter and senior firefighter, and the family, including a younger sister, adhered to the Protestant faith. Koch spent his early years in what is now Kreuzberg, Berlin. He began his education in 1902 and attended a Volksschule starting in 1903, graduating in 1911. Driven by his passion for teaching, Koch enrolled in a preparatory school in Kyritz to pursue training as a teacher. In 1914, however, his educational path was interrupted by the outbreak of the First World War. During this period, he joined the Imperial German Army, enlisting alongside his entire cohort, who collectively volunteered for military service, though not all entirely willingly. Serving as a trained combat medic and soldier (Sanitätssoldat), Koch sought to escape the rigid structure of his teacher training. During the war, he was buried under debris caused by a bomb explosion, an incident that resulted in a lifelong knee injury, causing unilateral knee stiffening. Despite these challenges, he distinguished himself during his military service, earning favourable evaluations and receiving a high-level decoration. He also survived a cholera infection, resulting in lasting repercussions for his health in later life; as a result of the treatment, serious changes to his mucosal linings and a subsequent allergy developed. From that point on, Koch remained fever-free only during the winter months.

== Teacher training and studies in health ==
At the end of the First World War, Koch returned to Berlin and resumed his pedagogy studies in the spring of 1919, completing it in the autumn of 1920 with the state examination. Concurrently, he undertook studies in physiotherapy, physical education, psychology, and medicine at the Royal Friedrich Wilhelm University (Königlichen Friedrich-Wilhelms-Universität), focussing on 'hygiene'. Among the lectures he attended was Fritz Albert Lipmann's course on 'physiology of women'. Lipmann, who would later win the Nobel Prize in Physiology or Medicine in 1953, significantly influenced Koch, who frequently referenced him in his own lectures.

Before 1919, Koch had no involvement with the Freikörperkultur (free body culture) movement, which had developed in Germany during the early 20th century. His interest in naturism emerged during his studies in hygiene. He explored Freikörperkultur literature such as Die Schönheit (The Beauty), and attended cabarets featuring nude dancing. He was particularly captivated by the elegance and expressiveness of dancer Della de Waal, which left a lasting impression on him.

In September 1920, immediately after completing his teacher training, Koch began working at a Volksschule in the proletarian section of Berlin-Kreuzberg as the class teacher of the 4th girls' class. Dedicated to advancing his reformist principles of a 'new upbringing', Koch actively participated in the Association of Resolute School Reformers (Bund Entschiedener Schulreformer), an organisation led by Paul Oestreich. He remained a member of the association until 1923, during which time he also joined the Social Democratic Party (SPD). Koch's reforms emphasised the connection between mind and body, advocating for comprehensive physical education, which he felt was neglected due to its reliance on monotonous and repetitive gymnastics (see also physical culture). As part of his efforts, Koch addressed widespread neglect of personal hygiene, famously highlighting the irregular bathing habits of the time:

It is a common habit to wash only your hands and face every day, but your feet only twice a week, and your whole body only every eight to fourteen days. Not to mention bathing.

— Adolf Koch

To promote health, Koch championed daily personal hygiene and dental care, which were not yet widespread practices at the time. He introduced simple yet effective measures, beginning with daily fingernail cleaning and appointing a 'cleaning commissioner' from among the students to inspect their peers' hands and nails. A week later, he implemented dental care routines. These efforts were highly successful, fostering a cleaner, healthier, and happier student community.

== Development of Koch-gymnastics ==
In 1921, Koch began studying gymnastics at the Anna Müller-Herrmann 'School for Physical Education and Movement Development' (Schule für Körpererziehung und Bewegungsbildung) in Berlin-Charlottenburg. This period coincided with the rise of expressive dance, which sought to convey emotions and moods through movement. Koch explored various gymnastics methods, including those developed by Bess Mensendieck, Rudolf Bode, Émile Jaques-Dalcroze, Dora Menzler, and the anthroposophical Loheland gymnastics. He particularly favoured Dora Menzler's approach, believing it combined the strengths of multiple systems.

Koch advocated for unclothed physical education, considering it essential for accurately observing and understanding the human body. This concept aligned with the educational vision of Anna Müller-Herrmann and Dora Menzler, who supported his philosophy. As an educator, Koch utilised nudity as a pedagogical tool to integrate physical and cultural studies, fostering the ideal of an 'athletic intellectual' and promoting gender integration.

...the most precise observation of that infinitely rich interplay of muscle and joint function and skeletal form, on the constant perception of any changes in the structure and function and expression of the body. It is inconceivable how the gymnast can find his way around the unusually complicated structure of the human body if he is not given the opportunity of constant observation of detail, as is the case with the doctor and the artist.

— Anna Müller-Herrmann, The question of clothing in physical education (Die Bekleidungsfrage in der Körpererziehung).

Koch sought to develop a modern general physical and posture school (Körper- und Haltungsschule) that integrated open-style dance gymnastics inspired by Mary Wigman. With support from Anna Müller-Herrmann, he designed exercises specifically tailored to children. For younger students, the emphasis was on joy, playfulness, and imagination, while for older students, the focus shifted to gravity- and momentum-based work exercises.

A proponent of coeducational practice, which was not the norm in Germany at that time, Koch advocated for boys and girls to practice together, stating that this approach also fostered mutual respect for the bodies of the opposite sex and encouraged an understanding that nudity, in itself, carries no inherent sexual connotation. At the Kreuzberg school, however, he was unable to implement his envisioned gymnastics programme; instead, nude bathing occasionally occurred in lakes during class excursions.

At the end of the 1920/21 school year, Koch had to leave the Kreuzberg school in Berlin. He was transferred under the accusation that he had inappropriately touched a girl on her abdomen during a regular class. Koch, who was medically trained, acknowledged touching the student on her abdomen but clarified that it was a medical examination for suspected appendicitis. The student was later taken to the hospital for this condition. Despite this explanation, Koch was reassigned as a disciplinary measure to a school in East Berlin, where he worked with children who were, in part, regarded as difficult to educate.

== First opportunity to implement Koch's reformist gymnastics ==
Following his transfer to a new school, Koch became acquainted with the Freikörperkultur (free body culture) social movement, which had been active in Berlin since shortly after 1900. Some parents of the school's pupils had formed a 'friendship society' focused on physical fitness in their leisure time, operating informally without formal statutes. Their children organised their own group, the 'Sun Land Youth Guild' (Jugendgilde Sonnenland). Recognising an opportunity to implement his reformist gymnastics methods, Koch joined the association. Meetings were held every Saturday at the youth centre (Jugendheim) on Mariannenufer 1a, where boys and girls, initially aged 10 to 13, practised gymnastics nude in the presence of their parents.

By late 1922, Koch introduced his gymnastics exercises into regular school lessons, with students initially wearing swimming trunks. In 1923, he completed his studies as a gymnastics teacher. The school's rector, Ruthe, commended Koch as 'particularly suitable for gymnastics lessons.' Koch was determined to make nudity a fundamental element of the exercises, viewing it as essential to his educational philosophy. Unable to incorporate this approach during regular school hours, Koch turned to the parents of his students for support.

In June 1923, this collaboration resulted in the formation of the 'Parents Groups for Free Physical Culture' (Elterngruppen für Freie Körperkultur). Participating parents were required to follow basic hygiene guidelines, which remained a central focus of Koch's teachings. The school's classrooms and auditorium were repurposed as practice spaces outside of regular hours; however, growing interest soon surpassed the available capacity. The term Freie Körperkultur (Free Physical Culture) first appeared in this context and was commonly abbreviated to Freikörperkultur (Free Body Culture), serving as a term in German-speaking regions to describe all unclothed recreational activities. Throughout his life, Koch favoured the term Freie Körperkultur, emphasising the 'free' (freie) aspect of physical culture.

Koch endeavoured to integrate his pioneering gymnastics programme, reflecting his philosophy of a natural lifestyle, into the school curriculum with parental endorsement. However, controversy arose when a visitor surreptitiously observed a teaching class—intended exclusively for invited teachers and parents—through a keyhole. This act led to a public scandal concerning alleged 'naked dancing' within a state institution. Consequently, the school authorities prohibited the courses, not due to the nature of the activities, but because Koch had failed to secure prior approval from the school board regarding the specific use of the facilities. Undeterred by this setback, Koch resigned from public school service and founded the Institute for Free Body Culture (Institut für Freikörperkultur).

== Foundation of Koch's Institute for Free Body Culture ==
In 1924, Koch established the private remedial 'Physical Culture School Adolf Koch' (Körperkulturschule Adolf Koch), which eventually expanded to thirteen schools across Weimar Germany. The institution flourished under the leadership of Koch, his first wife and gymnastics teacher, Ilka Dieball, and Hans Graaz, a physician, naturopathic practitioner, lifestyle reformer, and eugenicist. Its programme extended beyond gymnastics and physical exercises, incorporating hydrotherapy, intensive heliotherapy, comprehensive medical examinations and care, as well as intellectual pursuits such as topical discussions, seminars, access to a library, further education, and even the publication of Koch's journal and operation of his editorial office. All of these elements were designed with the overarching goal of advancing the physical and holistic welfare of individuals across all age groups. Among the institution's invited lecturers were notable figures, such as the physician and sexologist Magnus Hirschfeld. Koch's approach was distinctive in that he did not merely establish a nudist organisation but founded an educational institution deeply rooted in the principles of the broader Lebensreform movement, emphasising holistic well-being, personal development, and a natural lifestyle.

Documentary footage from Koch's schools showcases families, adults, children, and young people participating in dynamic physical activities, including rhythmic movements, energetic leaps, and playful exercises, all under Koch's guidance. He described the process as fostering a natural connection between physical movement and emotional expression, emphasising the importance of freedom and body awareness in education:

For example, if at the beginning of a session, I let the boys and girls run freely—first in a line, then forwards and backwards, then criss-crossing—it may seem of little purpose. However, for each individual, it is a playful reorientation in space, with and around others, awakening the sense of touch and creating moments of joy through surprises and turns within just a few minutes. A fixed structure for our gymnastics sessions cannot be determined, as there are no rigid exercise patterns. Fun and joy in movement are always the focus. Of course, these relaxed gymnastics sessions can also be conducted in the open outdoors [nature].

— Adolf Koch

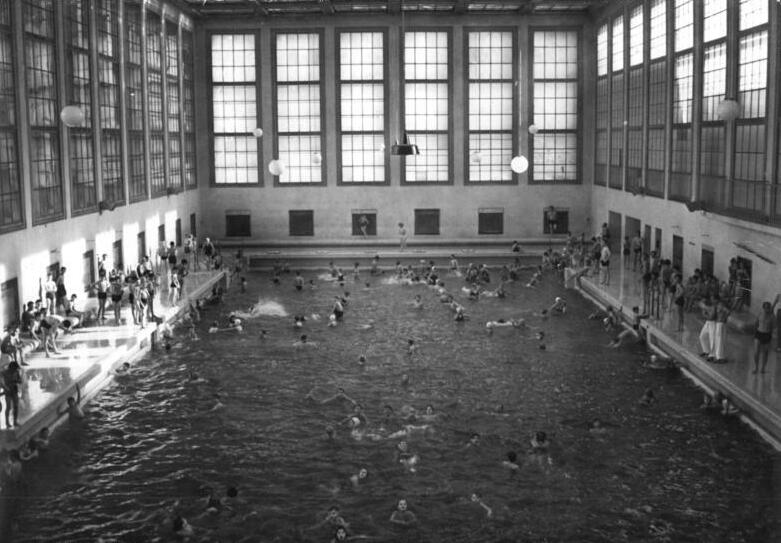
'Stadtbad Mitte', a celebrated public bathing facility in central Berlin, first opened its doors in 1930. It also hosted organised nude swimming sessions as part of the Freikörperkultur (free body culture) social movement. The hall ceased operations as a swimming venue in 2001 (photo taken in 1953).

Koch's physical culture schools represented a major advancement in the German Freikörperkultur (free body culture) movement of the time. In Berlin, his school at Friedrichstraße 218 was the nucleus of his network and operated alongside several Freikörperkultur associations established around 1900. The school also organised nude swimming and gymnastics sessions at Stadtbad Mitte (Berlin), a communal bathing facility in central Berlin, inaugurated in 1930. Furthermore, Koch oversaw an extensive outdoor school site in Selchow, south of Berlin, which featured sports fields, playgrounds, a lake, and barracks.

In November 1929, Koch's Berlin school hosted the first 'International Conference on Free Body Culture', attracting 200 delegates from 23 countries, including France, the United Kingdom, Austria, and Switzerland. In addition to this achievement, Koch oversaw an active publishing programme and served as the editor of the nudist journal Körperbildung - Nacktkultur (Physical Development - Nude Culture) from 1928 to 1932. Unlike other Freikörperkultur magazines of the time, this journal uniquely focused on presenting nudism as an indoor, classroom-based activity.

By 1930, Koch had established schools in Berlin, Breslau, Barmen-Elberfeld (Wuppertal), Hamburg, Ludwigshafen, and Mannheim, with a combined enrolment of approximately 20,000 students and 40,000 adherents. Attended by men, women, and children, these institutions had gained the support of prominent Social Democratic parliamentarians, educators, sociologists, and physicians. That same year, Koch noted that total membership in all German Freikörperkultur organisations had exceeded three million. His schools also offered four-year teaching certificates accredited by the German government, further solidifying their role in shaping modern physical education.

=== 1932 American documentary film ===
Koch, his educational institution, and his first wife and gymnastics teacher, Ilka Dieball, were prominently featured in the 1932 American educational documentary film originally titled This Naked Age. The film, one of the earliest documentaries on nudism, was directed by Michael Mindlin, with story by Jan Gay (Helen Reitman), who is also the author of On Going Naked (1932), one of the earliest works published in America—or anywhere in English—on the subject of nudism. The documentary film, subsequently released under the titles Back to Nature and This Nude World, examines the phenomenon of nudism worldwide, focusing on America, France, and Germany, where it identifies nudism as having originated. It further describes Koch's physical culture school as 'the largest nudist organisation in Germany' and his outdoor school site as 'the largest nudist camp in the world'.

== Suppression of Koch's work under National Socialism ==
The successes of Koch's schools were achieved despite significant challenges. Several judicial proceedings were brought against him by individuals with strict moral views, yet none resulted in convictions or the closure of his schools. Although these legal battles demanded considerable time and energy, they also elevated Koch's public profile. A far more profound setback occurred in 1933 when the National Socialists rose to power. This marked the forced closure of Koch's schools, as they were deemed incompatible with the regime's ideology. On 3 March 1933, the Prussian Minister of the Interior issued a circular decree targeting the 'suppression of the nudist movement'. Furthermore, Koch's writings were classified as 'forbidden and un-German' and were publicly destroyed during the infamous Nazi book burnings.

Despite considerable challenges, Koch persisted in his work, defying the Nazi regime. In 1935, he relinquished the Berlin school building on Friedrichstraße and relocated his institute to nearby Ritterstraße. To ensure its survival under increasing scrutiny, the institute was renamed the Institut für Eubiotik (Institute for Eubiotics). This rebranding allowed it to operate until its destruction during an Allied bombing raid on 3 February 1945. Throughout this period, Koch maintained a delicate balance between adaptation and clandestine independence. Nevertheless, 'even though a small circle around Adolf Koch continued to work illegally,' the 'Adolf Koch movement ceased to exist after 1933.'

In 1939, Koch was re-conscripted into the German Army during the Second World War, serving as a medical sergeant (Sanitätsfeldwebel). His responsibilities included the transport of wounded soldiers and physiotherapy at Castle Marquardt, near Berlin. In addition to his medical responsibilities, he oversaw sports programmes for the rehabilitation and follow-up care of disabled individuals. During his absence, his institute on Ritterstraße was managed by his first wife and gymnastics teacher Ilka Dieball, until its premises were destroyed in the Allied bombing raid of 3 February 1945.

== After the Second World War ==
After 1945, Koch focused on rebuilding his institute, which was subsequently recognised by the Senate of Berlin as a 'private open school facility' (Freie Schuleinrichtung). However, he was unable to replicate the successes he had achieved during the Weimar Republic period. In 1946, he established the Adolf Koch Institute (Adolf-Koch-Institut) for physical culture in Hasenheide, Berlin-Neukölln. From the second half of the 20th century, Koch's third wife, Irmgard (née Richter; born 26 July 1923), played a key role in managing the institute and also contributed as a gymnastics instructor.

In 1964, the German Association for Free Body Culture (DFK) formally distanced itself from Koch, citing concerns over his assertive public relations efforts. During the Adenauer era, the DFK frequently succumbed to public pressure, as naturism was still viewed by some as potentially harmful to young people and morally questionable.

Koch died on 2 July 1970. His wife, Irmgard, carried forward the promotion of Freikörperkultur gymnastics, travelling extensively to countries such as Switzerland and Hungary. In addition to teaching gymnastics until 2003, she also gave lectures on health and nutrition. That same year, she retired from the institute and relocated to Sanitz near Bad Doberan on the Baltic Sea coast to live with her daughter. Irmgard Koch died there on 10 August 2009.

In 1951, Koch's Berlin institute was succeeded by the 'Family Sport Association Adolf Koch' (Familien-Sport-Verein Adolf Koch e.V.), which remains active to this day.

== Programmatic background ==
Koch is regarded as a pioneer of nude culture, embodying the international and humanistic currents of the Freikörperkultur movement. In its early stages, influenced by a fashion trend of the late imperial era, this social movement was partially shaped by misinterpreted Darwinian concepts. However, Koch emerged from a socialist tradition rather than the 'Völkisch' (ethnic-nationalist) strand of the Freikörperkultur. Through his publication Wir sind nackt und nennen uns Du! (We are naked and call each other 'thou!' [you]), Koch championed ideals rooted in the Age of Enlightenment. These ideals reflected a pluralistic society of equal individuals and contributed to the growing popularity of his schools. He became a leading advocate for egalitarian principles, emphasising the communal and egalitarian essence of undressed group activities.

== Selected books published ==
- Körperbildung und Nacktkultur (Physical Education and Nude Culture), Leipzig 1924
- Nacktheit, Körperkultur und Erziehung. Ein Gymnastikbuch (Nudity, Physical Culture and Education. A Gymnastics Book), Leipzig 1929
- Der Kampf der Freikörperkulturbewegung von 1920 bis 1930. Sonderdruck aus 'Körperbildung - Nacktkultur' Blätter freier Menschen. Sonderheft 1: Schrei nach Licht. (The Struggle of the Free Body Culture Movement from 1920 to 1930. Special print from 'Physical Development - Nude Culture' Papers of Free People. Special Issue 1: Cry for Light.), Leipzig 1931
- Körperkultur und Erziehung (Physical Culture and Education), Berlin 1950

== See also ==
- Physical culture
- Body culture studies

== Bibliography ==
- Waiden, Andreas (2002). "Der proletarische Leib in der pädagogischen Konzeption Adolf Kochs" [The Proletarian Body in the Pedagogical Concept of Adolf Koch]. Jahrbuch für Historische Bildungsforschung Band 8 [Yearbook for Historical Educational Research, Volume 8] (PDF) (in German). Vol. 8. Berlin: Sektion Historische Bildungsforschung der Deutschen Gesellschaft für Erziehungswissenschaft (Section for Historical Educational Research of the German Society for Educational Science). pp. 107–134.
- Krüger, A.; Krüger, F.; Treptau, S. (2002). "Nudism in Nazi Germany: Indecent Behaviour or Physical Culture for the Well-being of the Nation". The International Journal of the History of Sport. 19 (4): 33–54. doi:10.1080/714001799. ISSN 0952-3367. S2CID 145116232.
- Jefferies, Matthew (2006). "'For a genuine and noble nakedness'? German naturism in the Third Reich". German History. 24 (1): 62–84. doi:10.1191/0266355406gh363oa.
- Williams, John Alexander (2007). Turning to Nature in Germany: Hiking, Nudism, and Conservation, 1900-1940. Stanford University Press. ISBN 978-0-8047-0015-3.
- Spender, Stephen (1994). World Within World. St. Martin's Press. ISBN 9780312113582.
- Mindlin, Michael (1932). "Documentary Film: This Nude World aka This Naked Age". Vision Pictures, Inc.
