= Heinrich Pudor =

German pioneer in naturism

Heinrich Pudor (31 August 1865 in Loschwitz (near Dresden) – 22 December 1943 in Leipzig) was a German Völkisch-nationalist pundit and a pioneer of the Freikörperkultur (FKK; free body culture, naturism) in Germany. He took the pseudonyms Heinrich Scham and Ernst Deutsch.

== Life ==
He was born the son of Friedrich Pudor, director of the Royal Conservatory in Dresden. Pudor initially studied music at the Dresden Kreuzschule and then at the conservatory. In 1886–87 he studied physiological psychology, philosophy and art history at the University of Leipzig, then moved to the University of Heidelberg, where he researched Schopenhauer's metaphysics of music and ideas, graduating in 1889.

Before his father's death, when he took over his position as leader of the conservatory, he travelled in France and Italy. His travel sketches were published in 1893 and 1895, establishing his reputation as a travel writer. He later published similar descriptions of Scandinavian countries. When inaugurated as head of the Dresden conservatory, he came to the decision only to teach German music. This was vehemently criticized by the teachers and the Dresden government; consequently, Pudor sold his interest the conservatory in June 1890.

With the proceeds, he founded his own publishing firm (in Munich, Berlin, and later New York City), publishing only his own writings, mainly books of poetry and self-help wherein he advocated Lebensreform ideas. He moved to a villa in Loschwitz and married a Jewish woman, Susanne Jacobi in 1891, divorcing her seven years later. In 1892 his columns started to appear in the Dresden Weekly for Art and Culture. His family moved to London in 1893, shortly before the publication of his Naked People. Rejoice in the Future was the first German book about naturism. Pudor had adopted vegetarianism two years before his move to London. In the following years, he published many works on lifestyle as well as other themes (architecture, linguistics, social policy, and cultural studies).

In 1898 he tried in vain to re-establish himself as a painter, sculptor, and musician, travelling extensively through Europe and returning to Germany. In Berlin, he married Linda Prill (the marriage lasted until 1923). In 1907 he published his travel descriptions of Scandinavian countries, also moving in that year to Leipzig. In 1910, he discovered handicraft, and founded the "Protective Order for German Quality Work." (Schutzverband für deutsche Qualitätsarbeit) One year later he established the journal "Unfair Competition: Communications of the Association for the protection of German Quality Work". In 1906 he published a book on bisexuality.

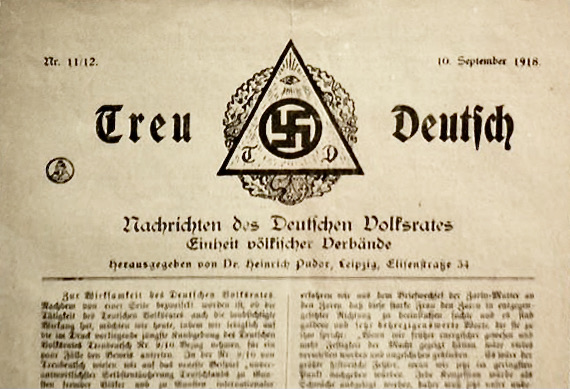
Pudor's Treu Deutsch: Nachrichten des Deutschen Volksrates ('True German: News from the German People's Council') published 1918, with an early example of a swastika used as a German ethno-nationalist symbol. From the collections of Leipzig City Museum.

From 1912 onward, Pudor issued almost exclusively antisemitic writings, mostly self-published. A prelude to this was the book, Germany for Germans. Next was Preliminary work on Laws against the Jewish Settlement in Germany and a publication, Antisemitic Armor of the German People's Council (in 1918 he also issued True German: News from the German People's Council. The People's Council was probably a creation of Pudor's). The journal was banned in 1915, and he renamed it the Iron Ring with issues continuing until 1923. Pudor's many publications irritated several politicians and led to many appearances in court. After he threatened liberal politician Gustav Stresemann with murder in his Treacherous Foreign Policy he was fined and imprisoned for a year on 17 March 1926.

== Nazi period ==
In September 1933 Pudor's magazine Swastika was banned for having criticized the leadership cult around Hitler in the Nazi party. He also mourned the Nazi "toleration" of Jews and attacked the origins and lifestyle of the new Nazi leaders (including Hitler and Goebbels). From 14 November 1933 to 5 July 1934, he was placed in protective custody because the magazine had continued to spread after the official ban.

After his imprisonment among socialists and communists, Pudor published many autobiographical writings in which he portrayed himself as a pioneer of the German nationalist movement. In 1943 he was again investigated for selling banned books (his older writings), but he died before the investigation was completed.

== Published works ==
- "Nudity in Art and Life (1906)". Journal of Homosexuality. 22 (1–2): 109–114. 1992. doi:10.1300/J082v22n01_11. ISSN 0091-8369. PMID 1816283.
- Naked People: A triumph-shout of the future. Translated from the German. Translated by Romanes, Kenneth. Vegetarian Publishing Office. 1894.

== See also ==
- Naturism in Germany
- Naturism
