= Bess Mensendieck =

American physician and gymnastics teacher (1864–1957)

Mensendieck System
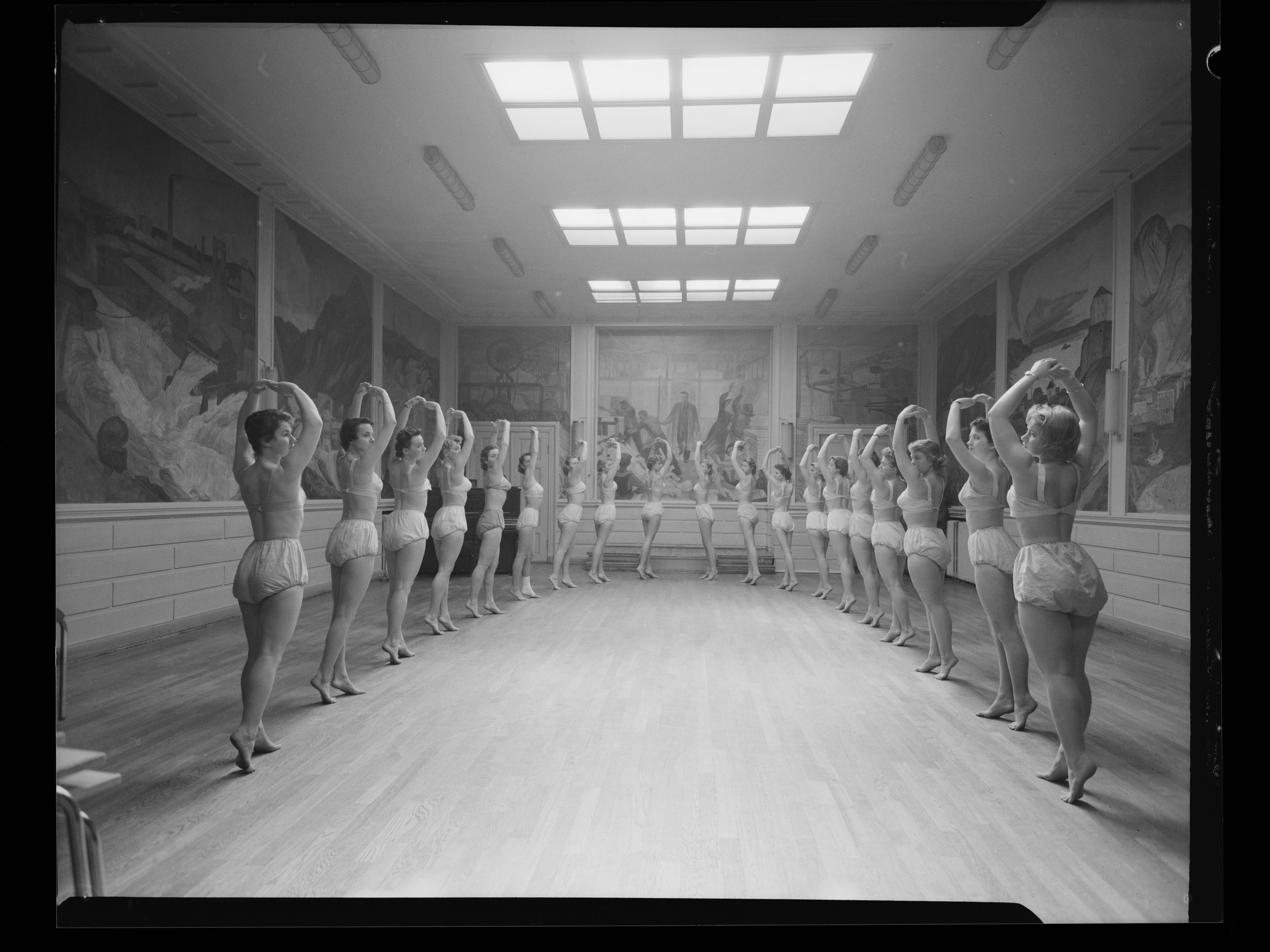
- Class of women student physiotherapists in the 1950s training the Mensendieck System
- Specialty: Physical therapy

Bess Mensendieck (1 July 1864 New York City – 27 January 1957, born Elizabeth Marguerite de Varel Mensendieck) was an American physician and gymnastics teacher of Dutch descent who developed the Mensendieck System, a therapeutic teaching methodology for female physical education claimed to be both corrective and preventive. She was one of the most important founders of early breathing and physical pedagogy in Europe and America.

Mensendieck published several books on the subject starting with the German publication titled Körperkultur des Weibes (Physical Culture of Women) with practical hygienic and aesthetic tips, 1906.

== Life ==
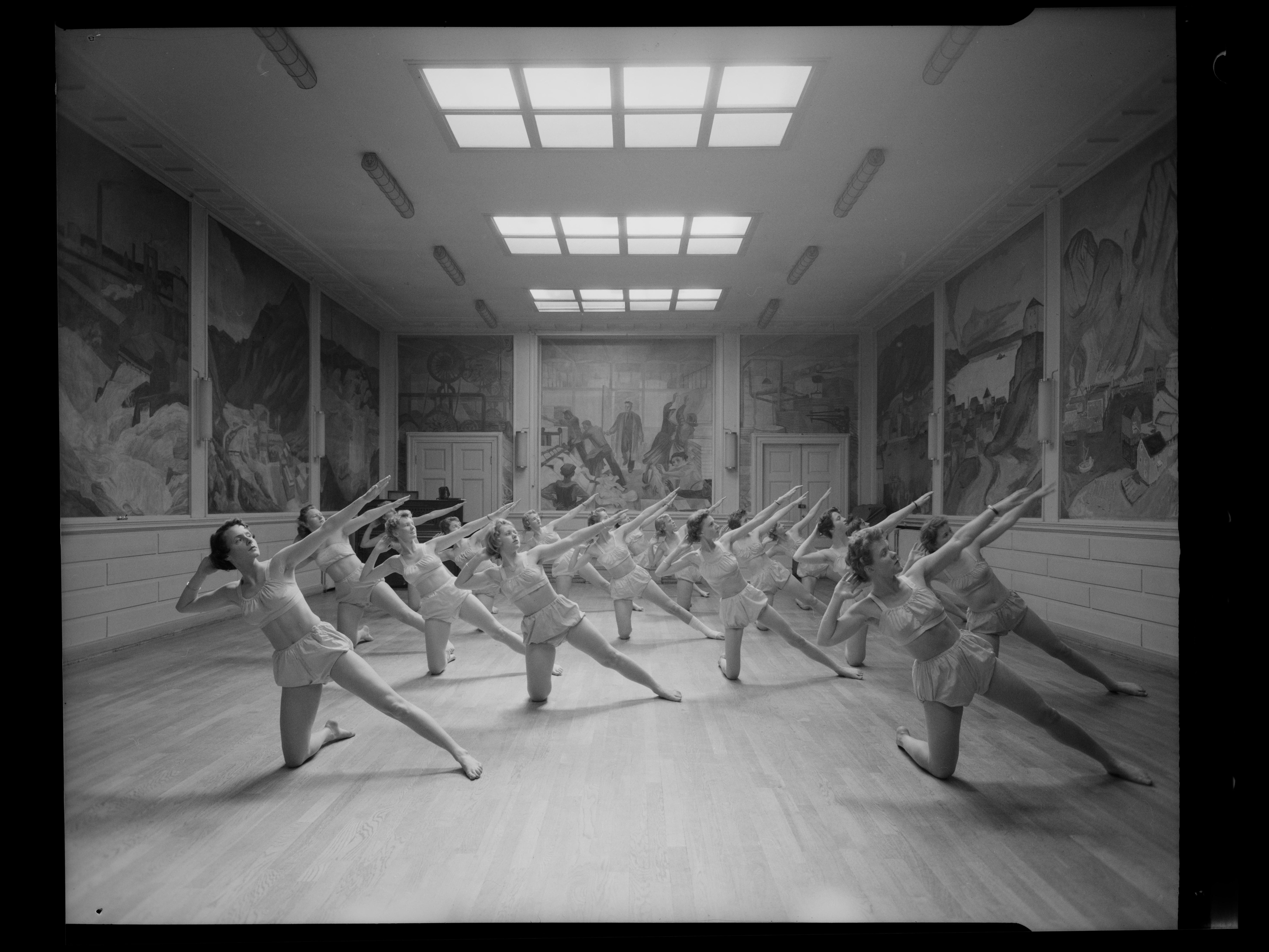
Photo: Mensendieck School in Oslo, Norway, women student physiotherapists training the Mensendieck System, 1950s. Now named the Mensendieckschool in Oslo College of Physiotherapy.

Mensendieck grew up in New York City and studied medicine in Zurich. To complete her practical knowledge of movement, posture, and breathing, she took singing lessons in Paris and continued to study gymnastics with Genevieve Stebbins in New York. Here she also learned the movement systems of François Delsarte and the Swedish remedial gymnastics of Pehr Henrik Ling.

Her particular concern was the improvement of posture and muscle structure of the women of her time. Based on her medical background, she built her gymnastics according to the Mensendieck system strictly on the anatomical and physiological findings of the time. The focus of the bodywork was again and again on the self-perception of posture and movement. To effectively demonstrate the exercise techniques and change in physical postures, she included a series of photos showing herself nude before, during, and after three months of training in her German book Körperkultur des Weibes (Munich, 1906), illustrating what can be achieved with her training. Mensendieck believed that nudity was fundamental in enhancing women's body consciousness, which motivated all activity that made the female body strong, healthy, and beautiful. However, because of the nude content, her published work was not equally accessible in the same way in all countries.

Mensendieck's books had a pervasive influence on German women instructors of gym classes into the 1930s. She taught her "Mensendieck System" mainly in Europe (Germany, Netherlands, Norway, Denmark and Austria). In 1910 the first institute for the training of gymnastics teachers was founded. After the First World War, Mensendieck left Europe, worked mostly in New York, and gave annual training courses in Germany and Denmark. She spent the summer months in her Norwegian summer house. In the 1950s she lived in Copenhagen for a few years and eventually moved back to New York.

Mensendieck also worked on the German documentary film Wege zu Kraft und Schönheit (Ways to Strength and Beauty), a silent black and white cultural film about the Weimar Republic directed by Wilhelm Prager released in 1925, which aimed to show the place of the body in modern society in which both men and women were not caring enough about their physical health.

== Works published ==
=== Germany ===
- Körperkultur des Weibes. Praktisch hygienische und praktisch ästhetische Winke. Munich 1906, later appeared under the title:
- Körperkultur der Frau. Praktisch hygienische und praktisch ästhetische Winke. Munich 1920
- Weibliche Körperbildung und Bewegungskunst. Munich 1912
- Funktionelles Frauenturnen. Munich 1923
- Mein System. In: Ludwig Pallat, Franz Hilker: Künstlerische Körperschulung. Breslau 1926
- Bewegungsprobleme. Die Gestaltung schöner Arme. Munich 1927
- Anmut der Bewegung im täglichen Leben. Munich 1929

=== America ===
- It's up to you. New York 1931
- Look Better, Feel Better. New York 1954

== Gallery ==
=== Norway ===
Mensendieck School in Oslo, Norway, 1950s, photos show women student physiotherapists training the Mensendieck System. The private college was established for Mensendieck-based physiotherapist education in Oslo in 1927 under the name Norsk Mensendieckskole A/S and was taken over by the Norwegian state in 1979. In 1992, the Mensendieck School was incorporated into the Bislet University College Center (Bislet høgskolesenter) and named the Mensendieckschool in Oslo College of Physiotherapy. From August 1994, it became part of the Department of Health Sciences at the newly established Oslo University College, now Oslo Metropolitan University. The education was called bachelor in physiotherapy, field of study Mensendieck, but was discontinued in 2020.

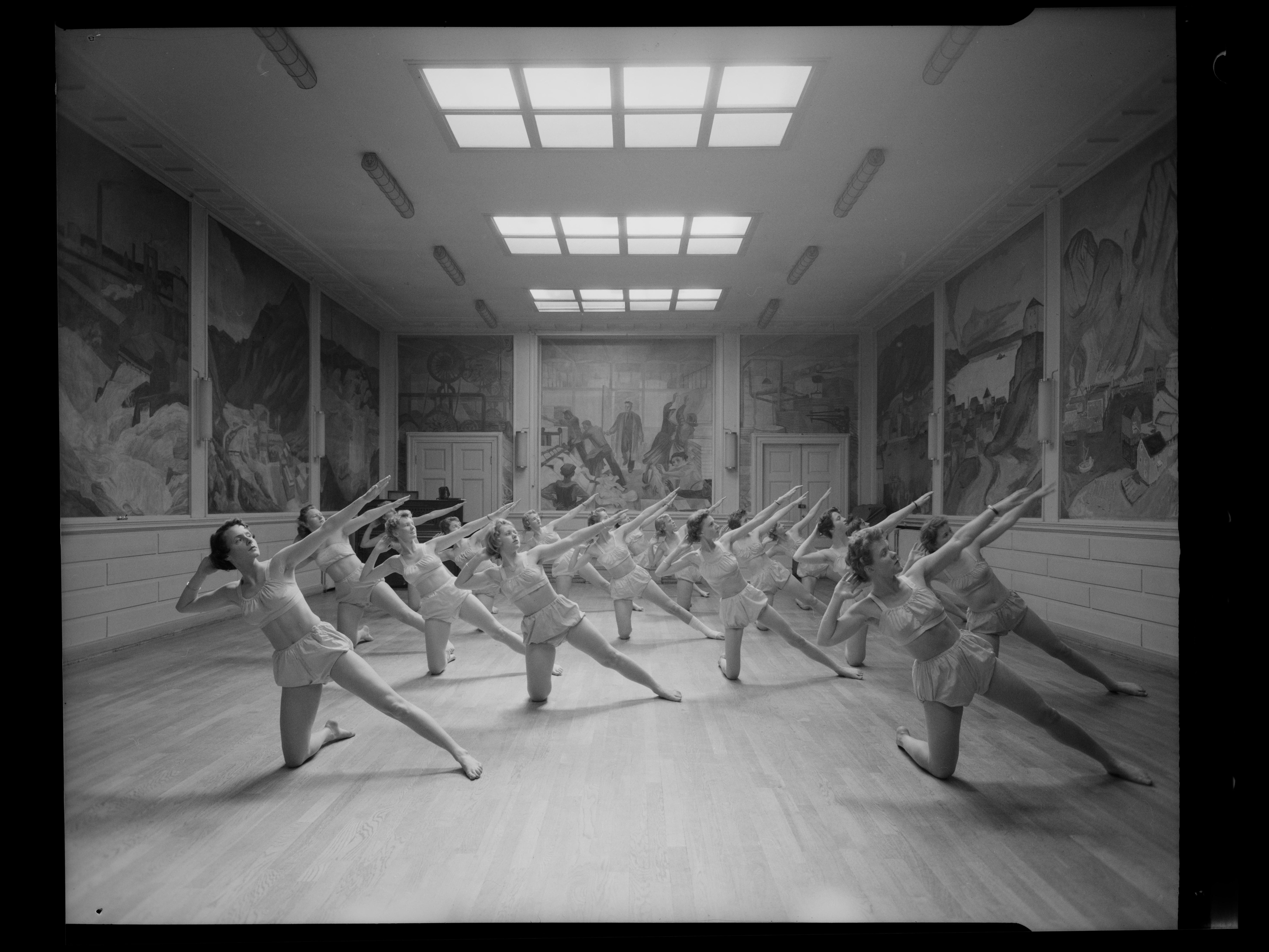

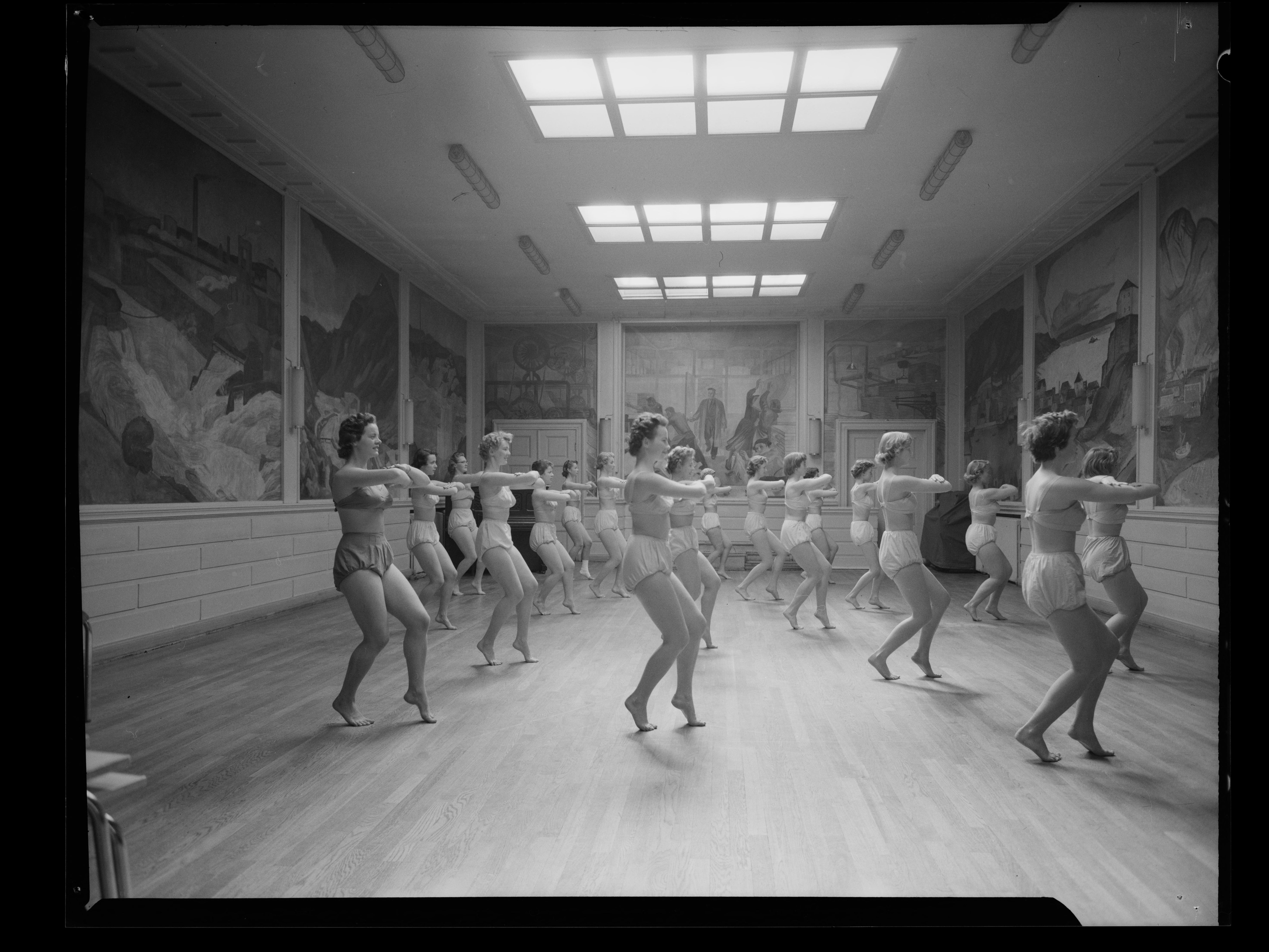

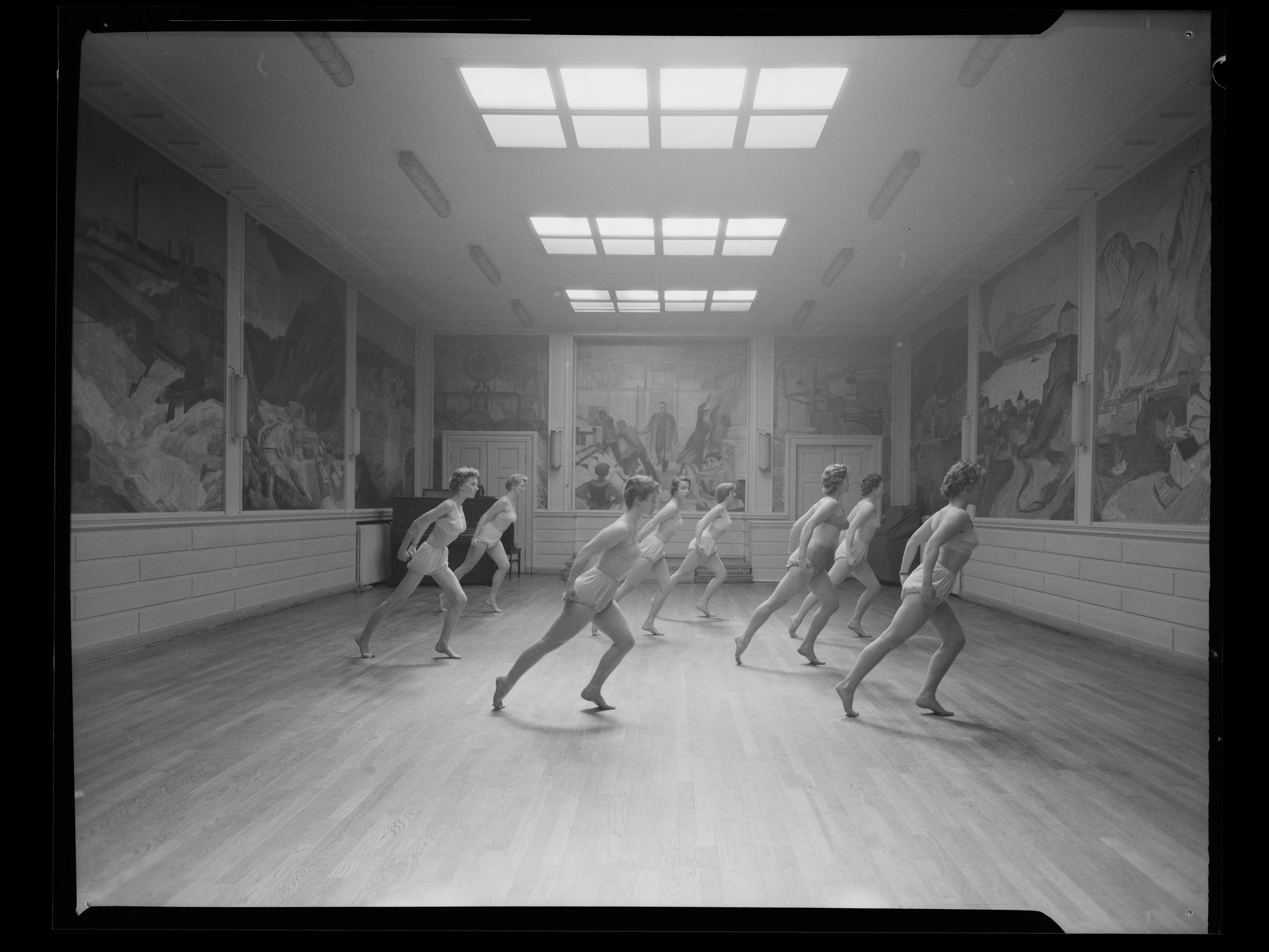

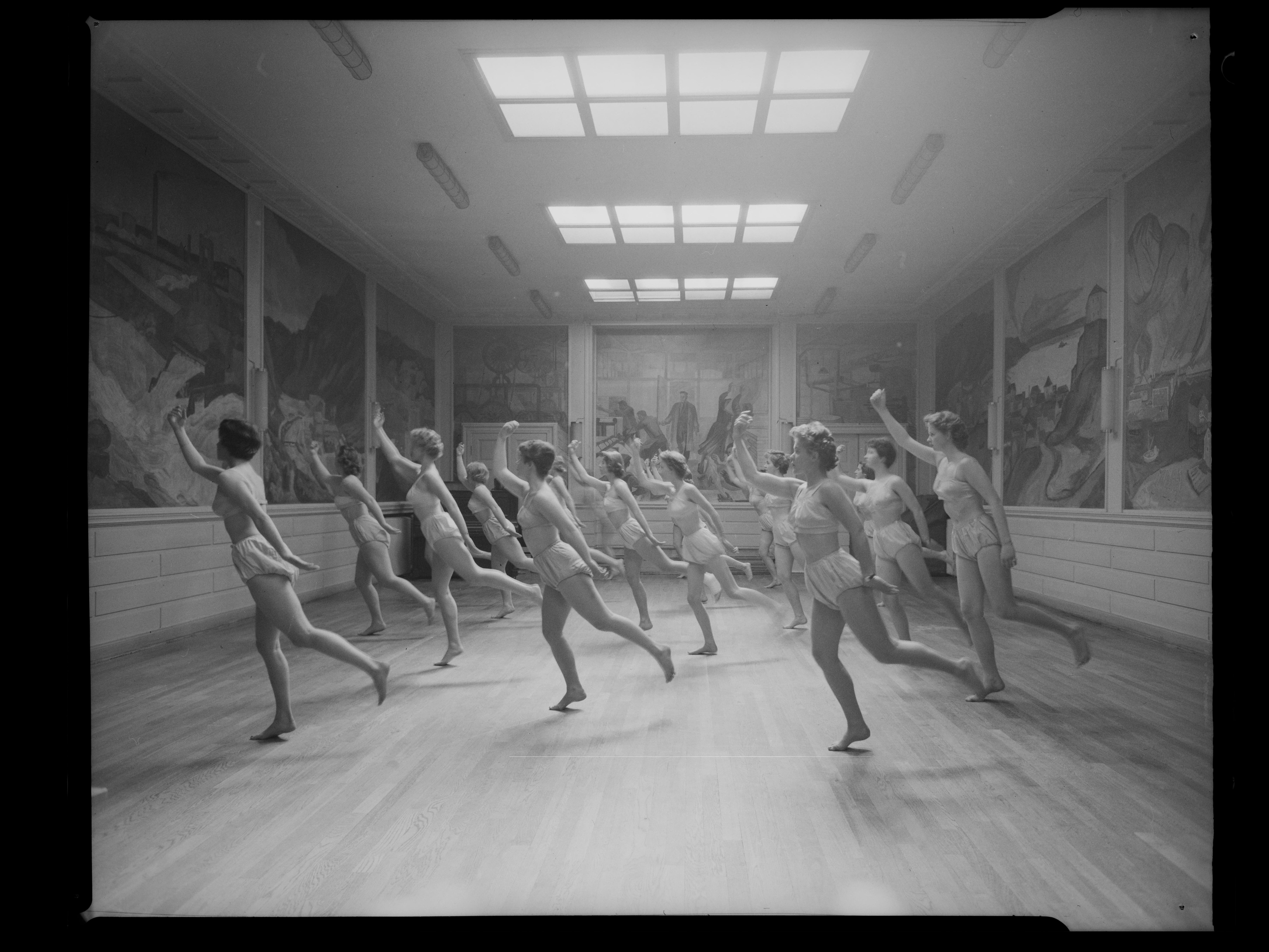

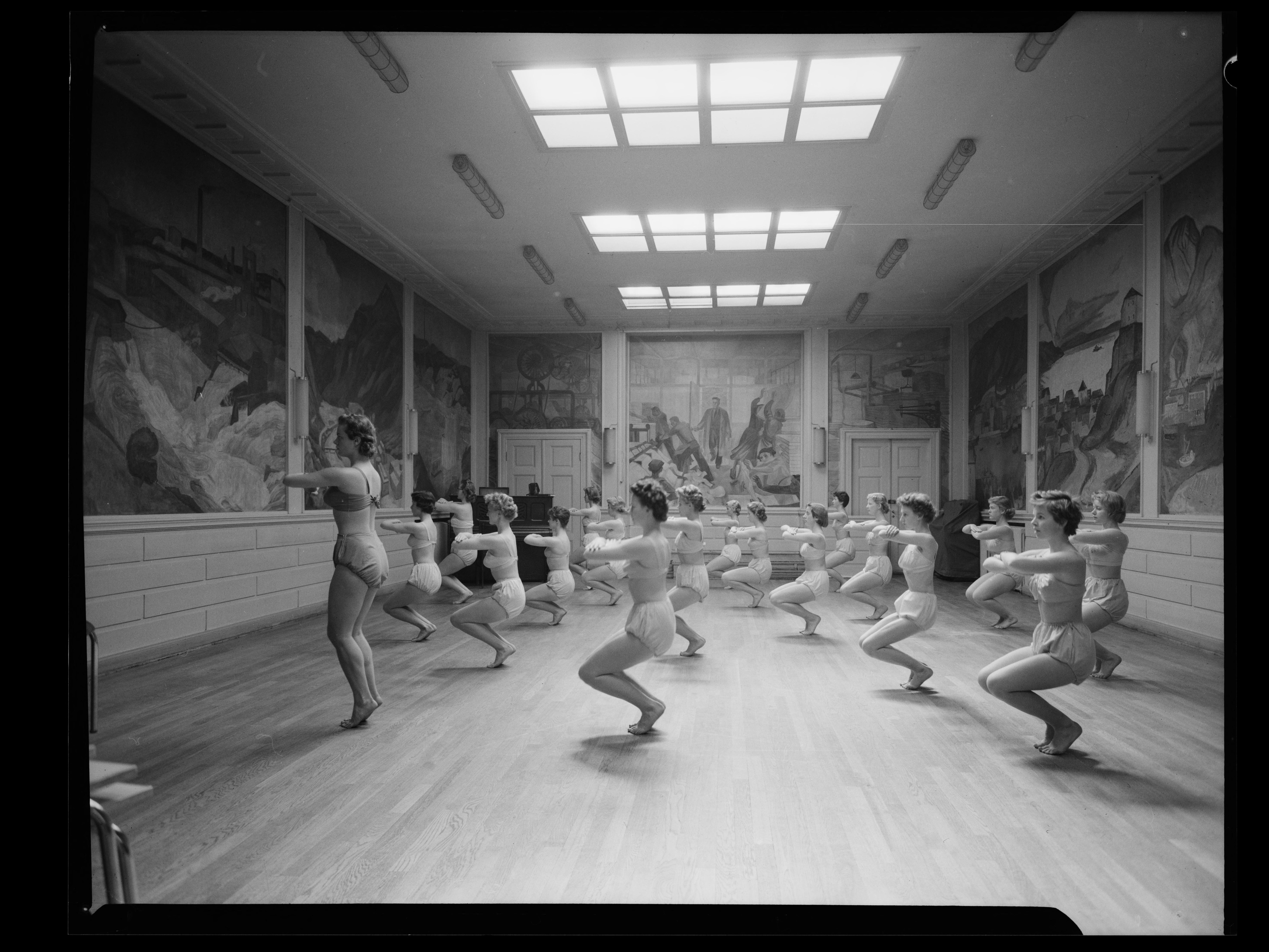

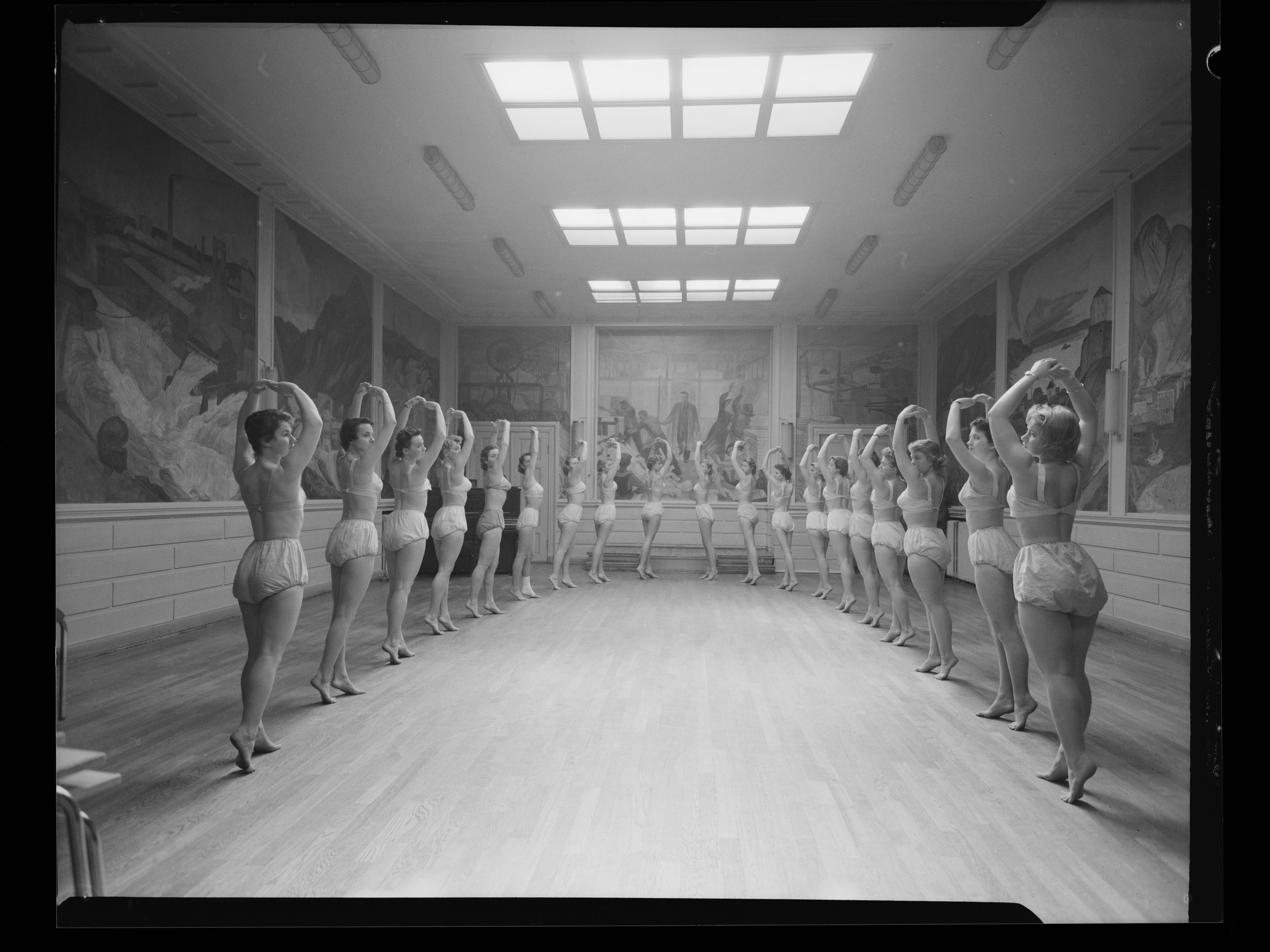

== See also ==
- Physical culture
- Body culture studies
- Physical therapy
