= Body culture studies =

Field of anthropology

Body culture studies describe and compare bodily practice in the larger context of culture and society, i.e. in the tradition of anthropology, history and sociology. As body culture studies analyse culture and society in terms of human bodily practices, they are sometimes viewed as a form of materialist phenomenology.

Its significance (in German Körperkultur, in Danish kropskultur) was discovered in the early twentieth century by several historians and sociologists. During the 1980s, a particular school of body culture studies spread, in connection with – and critically related to – sports studies. These studies were especially established at Danish universities and academies and operated in collaboration with Nordic, European and East Asian research networks.

Body culture studies include studies in dance, play and game, outdoor activities, festivities and other forms of movement culture. It floats towards studies in medical cultures, working habits, gender and sexual cultures, fashion and body decoration, popular festivity and popular culture studies.

These were made useful when it made the study of sport enter into a broader historical and sociological discussion – from the level of subjectivity to civil society, state and market.

== Earlier studies in body and culture ==
Since early 20th century, sociologists and philosophers had discovered the significance of the body, especially Norbert Elias, the Frankfurt School, and some phenomenologists. Later, Michel Foucault, Pierre Bourdieu and the Stuttgart Historical Behaviour Studies delivered important inspirations for the new body culture studies.

The sociologist Norbert Elias (1939) wrote the first sociology, which placed the body and bodily practice in its centre, describing the change of table manners, shame and violence from the Middle Ages to Early Modern court society as a process of civilisation. Later, Elias (1989) studied the culture of duel in Wilhelminian Prussia, throwing light on particular traits of the German sonderweg. Elias' figurational sociology of the body became productive especially in the field of sport studies (Elias/ Dunning 1986; Eric Dunning et al. 2004). His concept of the "process of civilisation" received, however, also critique from the side of comparative anthropology of bodily practices (Duerr 1988/2005).

The Frankfurt School of Critical Theory turned towards the body with Marxist and Freudian perspectives. Max Horkheimer and Theodor W. Adorno (1947) described the Western "dialectics of enlightenment" as including an underground history of the body. Body history lead from the living body to the dead body becoming a commodity under capitalism. A younger generation of the Frankfurt School launched the Neo-Marxist sports critique (Rigauer 1969) and developed alternative approaches to movement studies and movement culture (Lippe 1974; Moegling 1988). Historical studies about the body in industrial work (Rabinbach 1992), in transportation (Schivelbusch 1977), and in Fascist aesthetics (Theweleit 1977) as well as in the philosophy of space (Peter Sloterdijk 1998/ 2004) had their roots in this critical approach.

Philosophical phenomenology (→Phenomenology (philosophy)) paid attention to the body, too. Helmuth Plessner (1941) studied laughter and weeping as fundamental human expressions. Maurice Merleau-Ponty (1945) placed the body in the centre of human existence, as a way of experiencing the world, challenging the traditional body-mind dualism of René Descartes. Gaston Bachelard (1938) approached bodily existence via a phenomenology of the elements and of space, starting by "psychoanalysis of fire".

Based on phenomenological traditions, Michel Foucault (1975) studied the configurations of knowledge in the post-1800 society, launching the concept of modern panoptical control (→Panopticon). The body appeared as object of military discipline and of the panopticon as a mechanism of "the biopolitics of power". Foucault's approach became especially influential for studies in sport, space, and architecture (Vertinsky/ Bale 2004) as well as for studies in the discipline of gymnastics and sport (Vigarello 1978; Barreau/ Morne 1984; Vertinsky/ McKay 2004).

While Foucault's studies focused on top-down strategies of power, Pierre Bourdieu directed his attention more towards bottom-up processes of social-bodily practice. For analysing the class aspect of the body, Bourdieu (1966/67) developed the influential concept of habitus as an incorporated pattern becoming social practice by diverse forms of taste, distinction and display of the body. Some of Bourdieu's disciples applied these concepts to the study of sports and gymnastics (Defrance 1987).

In Germany, influences of phenomenology induced body culture studies in the historical field. The Stuttgart school of Historical Behaviour Studies focused from 1971 on gestures and laughter, martial arts, sport and dance to analyze changes of society and differences between European and non-European cultures (Nitschke 1975, 1981, 1987, 1989, 2009; Henning Eichberg 1978).

These approaches met with tendencies of the late 1970s and 1980s, when humanities and sociology developed a new and broader interest in the body. Sociologists, historians, philosophers and anthropologists, scholars from sport studies and from medical studies met in talking about "the return of the body" or its "reappearance" (Kamper/ Wulf 1982). The new interest towards the body was soon followed up by the term "body culture" itself.

== The word and concept of "body culture" – alternative practice ==
The word "body culture" first appeared around 1900, originating from the German Körperkultur. Initially, it signified a specific form of physical practice and well-being. The so-called "life reform" (German: Lebensreform) aimed at the clothing reform and nurtured new bodily activities, creating a new sector alongside established gymnastics and sports. The third sector of movement culture included Freikörperkultur (FKK, free body culture, also known as naturism), rhythmic-expressive gymnastics, expressionist dance, yoga, and bodybuilding (Wedemeyer-Kolwe 2004), and a new type of youth wandering (Wandervogel). Despite their diversity, these activities were collectively termed Körperkultur in German, physical culture (→physical education) in English, culture physique in French, and kropskultur in Danish. Inspirations from the body culture movement led to early studies in the history of bodily positions and movements (Gaulhofer 1930; Marcel Mauss 1934).

In German Socialist workers' sport, the concept of Körperkultur (body culture) held a prominent place. This concept also entered into Russian Socialism, where fiskultura became an alternative to bourgeois sport, uniting the revolutionary fractions of the more aesthetic Proletkult and more health-oriented "hygienism" (Riordan 1977). Later, Stalinism forced the contradictory terms under the formula "sport and body culture," a trend that continued in the Soviet bloc after 1945. When the 1968 student movement revived Marxism, the concept of body culture—Körperkultur in West Germany, "somatic culture" in America—re-entered sports-critical discourse with new analytical dimensions. Quel corps? (Which body?) was the title of a critical review of sports edited by the French Marxist educationalist Jean-Marie Brohm in 1975 to 1997. In Germany, a series of books titled "Sport: Kultur, Veränderung" (Sport: Culture, Change) marked the body cultural turn from 1981, featuring works of Rigauer, Elias, Eichberg, and others.

== Body culture studies – a new critical school ==
In Denmark, a particular school of Body Culture Studies – kropskultur – developed since around 1980 in connection with the critique of sport (Korsgaard 1982; Eichberg 1998; Vestergård 2003; Nielsen 1993 and 2005). It had its background in Danish popular gymnastics and in alternative movement practices – outdoor activities, play and game, dance, meditation. In Finland, the concept ruumiinkulttuuri found a similar attention (Sironen 1995; Sparkes/ Silvennoinen 1999).

In international cooperation, "body anthropology" became the keyword for French, Danish and German philosophers, sociologists and educationalists who founded the Institut International d'Anthropologie Corporelle (IIAC) in 1987. They undertook case studies in traditional games as well as in "scenes" of new urban body cultures (Barreau/ Morne 1984; Barreau/ Jaouen 1998; Dietrich 2001 and 2002).

Body culture studies found a particular interest in East Asian countries. In Japan, the sociologist Satoshi Shimizu from the University of Tsukuba established in 2002 a Centre for the Study of Body Culture, publishing the review Gendai Sports Hyôron (Contemporary Sport Critique, in Japanese, since 1999). In Taiwan, Hsu I-hsiung from the National Taiwan Normal University founded in 2003 the Taiwan Body Culture Society (Taiwan shenti wenhua xiehui), publishing the reviews Sport Studies (in Chinese, since 2007) and Body Culture Journal (in Chinese, since 2005). And in Korea, Jong Young Lee from the University of Suwon published since 2004 the International Journal of Eastern Sport & Physical Education, focusing on body culture and traditional games.

These initiatives were connected with each other both by contents and by personal networks. In the English and American world, Allen Guttmann (1978, 1996, 2004), John Hoberman (1984), John Bale (1996, 2002, 2004), Susan Brownell (1995, 2008) and Patricia Vertinsky (2004) contributed by opening the history, sociology and geography of sports towards body culture studies.

While the concept of body culture earlier had denoted an alternative practice and was used in singular, it became now an analytical category describing body cultures in plural. The terms of physical culture (or physical education) and body culture separated – the first describing a practice, the second a subject of theoretical analysis.

== Questioning the "individual" body ==
Studies in body culture have shown that bodily existence is more than just "the body" as being an individual skin bag under control of an individual mind. Bodily practice happens between the different bodies. This questions current types of thinking "the individual": the epistemological individualism and the thesis of 'late-modern individualization'.

The methodological habit of counter-posing "the individual" and "the society" is largely disseminated in sociology. It was fundamentally criticized by Norbert Elias who underlined that there was no meaning in the separation between the individual as a sort of core of human existence and the society as a secondary environment around this core. Society was inside the human body. In contrast, the epistemological solipsism treated human existence as if the human being was alone in the world – and was only in a secondary process "socialized" (Peter Sloterdijk 1998 vol. 1).

Another current assumption is the historical-sociological individualism. Sociologists as Ulrich Beck and Anthony Giddens have postulated that individualization during "high" or "late modernity" had replaced all earlier traditions – religion, nation, class – and left "the individual" alone with its body. The body, thus, got a central position as the only fix-point of "self-identity" left after the dissolution of the traditional norms. The individual chooses and makes its own body as a sort of "gesamtkunstwerk Ego".

Body-cultural studies have challenged this assumption (Henning Eichberg 2010: 58-79). They throw light on inter-bodily relations, within which the human individuality has a much more complex position.

== Social time ==
An important aspect of body culture is temporal. Modern society is characterized by the significance of speed and acceleration. Sport, giving priority to competitive running and racing, is central among the phenomena illustrating the specifically modern velocity (Eichberg 1978, Bale 2004). The historical change from the circulating stroll in aristocratic and early bourgeois culture to modern jogging as well as the changes from coach traffic via the railway (Schivelbusch 1977) to the sport race of automobiles (→auto racing) (Sachs 1984) produced new body-cultural configurations of social time.

On the basis of transportation and urbanism, blitzkrieg and sports, the French architect and cultural theorist Paul Virilio (1977) launched the terms of "dromology" (i.e. science of racing) and "dromocracy" (power or dominance of velocity) to describe the knowledge and the politics of modern social acceleration. But the concept of social time embraces many more differentiations, which can be explored by comparing time-dynamic movements of different ethnic cultures (Hall 1984).

== Social space ==
Another important aspect of body culture is spatial. Bodily display and movement always create space – physical space as socio-psychical space and vice versa. Bodily activities have during history changed between indoor or outdoor milieus, between non-specialized environment, specialized facilities (→sports facilities) and bodily opposition against existing standardized facilities or what was called "sport scape". In movement, straight lines and the culture of the streamline were confronted by mazes and labyrinthine structures, by patterns of fractal geometry. All these patterns are not just spatial-practical arrangements, but they play together with societal orientations. Under this aspect, one has described the history of panoptical control (Foucault 1975; Vertinsky/ Bale 2004), the parcellation of the sportive space, and the hygienic purification of spaces (Augestad 2003). Proxemics (Hall 1966), the study of distance and space, has become a special field of body culture studies.

Body culture studies have also influenced the understanding of "nature". In the period around 1800, the "nature" of body culture – of outdoor life, naturism and green movements (→green politics) – became a world of liberation and opposition: "Back to nature!" In the course of modern industrial culture, this "other" nature became subjected to colonization and simulation, forming a "second nature". It even became a virtual world, which is simulating people's senses as a "third nature". The study of body culture contributed to a history of cultural ecology (Eichberg 1988).

Body cultural studies also contributed to a differentiation between what in everyday language often is confused as 'space' and 'place' whose dialectics were shown by the Chinese-American philosopher Yi-Fu Tuan (see Bale 2004). Space can be described by coordinates and by certain choreographies. Spatial structures can be standardized and transferred from place to place, which is the case with the standardized facilities of sports. Place, in contrast, is unique – it is only here or there. Locality is related to identity. People play in a certain place – and create the place by play and game. The place plays with the people, as a co-player.

== Body culture and politics ==
Body culture can also be considered political such as how the body shape and appearance as well as sports, dance, and other recreational activities manifest and influence social change driven by politics. This is best demonstrated by practice theory, which explains that, since body techniques serve as the means by which existing social order is produced and maintained, it, therefore, become important sites for challenging and transforming the social order when change does occur. In power plays, for instance, the body is used in sporting events as a form of rhetoric, articulating political causes. Immediately after the 9/11 attacks, the body became an important part of George W. Bush's geopolitics in addition to the projection of American power. On the other hand, the body was also used to condemn elitist and spectator sport within a mass physical culture starting this period in America, which evokes participation, inclusion, and populism. The body is an integral component in the feminist politics. It is maintained that in order for this feminist initiatives to be effective, it is imperative that women's bodies, along with their works, labor, and voice, are present for everyone to see.

== Civilization, discipline, modernity ==
Studies of body culture enriched the analysis of historical change by conflicting terms. Norbert Elias (1986) studied sport in order to throw light on the civilizing process (→The Civilizing Process). In sports, he saw a line going from original violence to civilized interlacement and pacification. Though there were undertones of hope, Elias tried to avoid evolutionism, which since the nineteenth century postulated a 'progressive' way from 'primitive' to 'civilized' patterns.

While the concept of civilization normally had hopeful undertones, discipline had more critical undertones. Cultures of bodily discipline became visible – following Foucault and the Frankfurt School – in Baroque dance (Lippe 1974), in aristocratic and bourgeois pedagogy of the spinal column during the eighteenth and nineteenth centuries (Vigarello 1978), and in hygienic strategies, school sanitation and school gymnastics during the twentieth century (Augestad 2003). Military exercise (→military drill) in Early Modern times was the classic field for body cultural discipline (Gaulhofer 1930; Kleinschmidt 1989).

In the field of sports, a central point of body-cultural dispute has been the question whether sport had its roots in Ancient Greek competitions of the Olympic type or whether it was fundamentally linked to modernity. While nineteenth century's Neo-Humanism, Classicism and Olympism assumed the ancient roots of sport, body cultural studies showed that the patterns central to modern sports – quantification, rationalisation, principle of achievement – could not be dated before the industrial culture of the eighteenth and nineteenth centuries (Eichberg 1978; Guttmann 1978). What was practiced before, were popular games, noble exercises, festivities of different character, children's games and competitions, but not sport in modern understanding. The emergence of modern sport was an eruptive innovation rather than a logical prolongation of earlier practices. As a revolution of body culture, this transformation contributed to a deeper understanding of the Industrial Revolution. The so-called Eichberg-Mandell-Guttmann theory about the uniqueness of modern sport became, however, a matter of controversies and was opposed by other historians (Carter/Krüger 1990).

What came out of the controversies between the concepts of modernity, evolution, civilization, discipline and revolution was that "modernization" only can be thought as a non-lineal change with nuances and full of contradictions. This is how the history of sport (Nielsen 1993 and 2005) and of gymnastics (Defrance 1987; Vestergård Madsen 2003) as well as the history of running (Bale 2004) have been described in body-cultural terms.

One of the visible and at the same time deeper changes in relation to the modern body concerns the dress reform and the appearance of the naked body, especially in the years between 1900 and the 1920s. The change from noble pale skin to suntanned skin as a 'sportive' distinction was not only linked to sport, but had a strong impact on society as a whole. The change of appreciated body colour reversed the social-bodily distinctions between people and classes fundamentally, and nudism became a radical expression of this body-cultural change.

== Industrial body and production ==
Body culture studies have cast new light on the origins and conditions of the Industrial Revolution, which in the eighteenth and nineteenth centuries transformed people's everyday life in a fundamental way. The traditional common-sense explanations of industrialization by technology and economy as 'driving forces' have shown as insufficient. Economic interests and technological change had their basic conditions in human social-bodily practice. The history of sport and games in body cultural perspective showed that this practice was changing one or two generations, before the Industrial Revolution as a technological and economic transformation took place. What had been carnival-like festivities, tournaments and popular games before, became modern sport by a new focus on results, measuring and quantifying records (Eichberg 1978; Guttmann 1978). Under the aspect of the principle of achievement, there was no sport in ancient Egypt, in ancient Greece, among the Aztecs or Vikings, and in European Middle Ages, though there were games, competitions and festivities. Sport as a new type of body culture resulted from societal changes in the eighteenth-nineteenth centuries.

The genesis of sport in connection with industrial productivity called to attention the historical-cultural relativity of "production" (→Manufacturing) itself. Studies in the history of "the human motor" and the "mortal engines" of sport showed reification (→reification (Marxism)) and technology as lines of historical dynamics (Rigauer 1969; Vigarello 1988; Rabinbach 1992; Hoberman 1992). Production became apparent not as a universal concept, but as something historically specific – and sport was its body-cultural ritual.

== Trialectics of body culture ==
Body culture as a field of contradictions demands a dialectical approach, but it is not dualistic in character. Body culture studies have revealed trialectical relations inside the world of sports (Eichberg 1998, 2010; Bale 1996, 2002 and 2004).

The hegemonic model of Western modern body culture is achievement sport, translating movement into records. Sportive competition follows the logic of productivity by bodily strain and forms a ranking pyramid with elite sports placed at the top and the losers at the bottom. Through sportive movement, people display a theatre of production.

A contrasting model within modern body culture is delivered by mass sports. In gymnastics and fitness training, the body is disciplined by subjecting it to certain rules of "scientific", social geometrical or aesthetic order (Roubal 2007). By rhythmic repetition and formal homogenization, the individual bodies are integrated into a larger whole, which is recommended in terms of reproduction (→reproduction (economics)), as being healthy and educative. Through fitness sport, people absolve a ritual of reproductive correctness and integration.

A third model is present in popular festivity, dance and play. In carnival and folk sport, people meet people by festive movement. This type of gathering may give life to the top-down arrangements of both productive achievement sport and reproductive fitness sport, too. But the body experience of popular festivity, dance, play and game is a-productive in itself – it celebrates relation in movement.

Practices of sport in their diversity and their historical change, thus, clarify inner contradictions inside social life more generally – among these the contradictions between state, market and civil society. The trialectics of body culture throw light on the complexity of societal relations.

== Body cultures in plural ==
"Culture" in singular is an abstraction. The study of body culture is always a study of body cultures in plural. Body cultures show human life in variety and differences, assimilation and distinction, conflicts and contradictions. This demands a comparative approach to otherness, and this is the way several studies in body culture have gone.

Culture was studied as cultures already by the school of Cultural Relativism in American anthropology (American Anthropological Association) in the 1930s (Ruth Benedict). Postcolonial studies have taken this pluralistic perspective up again (Bale 1996 and 2004; Brownell 1995; Azoy 2003; Leseth 2004). The discourse in singular about "the body in our society" became problematic when confronted with body cultures in conflict and tension.

The plurality and diversity of body cultures is, however, not only a matter of outward relations. There are also body cultures in plural inside a given society. The study of different class habitus (→class culture), youth cultures, gender cultures (→gender identity) etc. opened up for deeper insights into the differentiation of civil society.

== Configurational analysis ==
Body culture studies try to understand bodily practice as patterns revealing the inner tensions and contradictions of a given society. In order to analyze these connections, the study of body culture has turned attention to the configurations of movement in time and space, the energy of movement, its interpersonal relations and objectification (→Configurational analysis (Konfigurationsanalyse)). Above this basis, people build a superstructure of institutions and ideas, organising and reflecting body culture in relation to collective actions and interests (Eichberg 1978; Dietrich 2001: 10-32; see keyword 2).

== Body culture in Tattoos ==
The concept of tattoos being a symbols to represent one being part of a group or a member of a tribe can are indications of how tattoos are used to study culture. In most cultures, tattoos play an important role in the society to show a person has completed a rite of passage. Most tribes and gangs use tattoos as a way to identify which society they belong to and a hierarchical status. Just as how symbolic anthropology by Victor Turner describes how symbols make a culture, this can be true for tattoos. Tattoos represent a belief system, which is connected to the stages of life, as we see in the tattoo culture of the Northeastern part of India, where several ethnic communities use tattoo to make meanings about a women's phase of life (status of infancy, puberty, marriage, motherhood).

== Literature ==
- Augestad, Pål 2003: Skolering af kroppen. Om kunnskap og makt i kroppsøvningsfaget. (School of the body. About knowledge and power in the school subject Physical Education) Bø: Høgskolen i Telemark.
- Azoy, G. Whitney 2003: Buzkashi. Game and Power in Afghanistan. Long Grove/Ill.: Waveland, 2nd ed. (1st ed. 1982).
- Bachelard, Gaston 1938: La psychanalyse du feu. – English 1964: Psychoanalysis of fire. Boston: Beacon.
- Bale, John & Joe Sang 1996: Kenyan Running. Movement Culture, Geography and Global Change. London: Frank Cass.
- Bale, John 2002: Imagined Olympians: Body Culture and Colonial Representation in Rwanda. Minneapolis: University of Minnesota Press.
- Bale, John 2004: Running Cultures. Racing in Time and Space. London/New York: Routledge.
- Barreau, Jean-Jacques & Jean-Jacques Morne 1984: Sport, expérience corporelle et science de l'homme. Éléments d'épistémologie et anthropologie des activités physiques et sportives. Paris: Vigot.
- Barreau, Jean-Jacques & Guy Jaouen 1998 (eds.): Éclipse et renaissance des jeux populaires. Des traditions aux régions de l'Europe de demain. Karaez: FALSAB. (First ed. 1991).
- Bourdieu, Pierre 1966/67: "Champs intellectuel et projet créateur." In: Temps modernes, 22, 865-906.
- Brohm, Jean-Marie 2001 (ed.): Quel corps? Textes rassemblés. Paris: Éditions de la passion.
- Brownell, Susan 1995: Training the Body for China. Sports in the Moral Order of the People's Republic. Chicago & London: University of Chicago Press.
- Brownell, Susan 2008 (ed.): The 1904 Anthropology Days and Olympic Games: Sport, Race and American Imperialism. University of Nebraska Press, in press.
- Carter, John Marshall & Arnd Krüger 1990 (eds.): Ritual and Record. Sports Records and Quantification in Pre-Modern Societies. New York: Greenwood.
- Defrance, Jacques 1987: L'excellence corporelle. La formation des activités physiques et sportives modernes. Rennes: Presses Universitaires de Rennes.
- Dietrich, Knut 2001 (ed.): How Societies Create Movement Culture and Sport. Copenhagen: Institute of Exercise and Sport Sciences, University of Copenhagen.
- Dietrich, Knut 2002 (ed.): Socialisation and the Social Change in Movement Culture and Sport. Copenhagen: Institute of Exercise and Sport Sciences, University of Copenhagen.
- Duerr, Hans Peter 1988-2005: Der Mythos vom Zivilisationsprozess. Vols. 1-5: Nacktheit und Scham, Intimität, Obszönität und Gewalt, Der erotische Leib, Die Tatsachen des Lebens. Frankfurt/M.: Suhrkamp.
- Dunning, Eric, Dominic Malcolm & Ivan Waddington 2004 (eds.): Sport Histories. Figurational Studies of the Development of Modern Sports. London: Routledge.
- Eichberg, Henning 1978: Leistung, Spannung, Geschwindigkeit. Sport und Tanz im gesellschaftlichen Wandel des 18./19. Jahrhunderts. Stuttgart: Klett-Cotta.
- Eichberg, Henning 1988: Leistungsräume. Sport als Umweltproblem. Münster: Lit.
- Eichberg, Henning 1998: Body Cultures. Essays on Sport, Space and Identity. London: Routledge.
- Eichberg, Henning 2004: The People of Democracy. Understanding Self-Determination on the Basis of Body and Movement. Århus: Klim.
- Eichberg, Henning 2010: Bodily Democracy. Towards a Philosophy of Sport for All. London: Routledge.
- Elias, Norbert 1939: Über den Prozess der Zivilisation. Soziogenetische und psychogenetische Untersuchungen. 17th ed. Frankfurt/M.: Suhrkamp 1992, vols. 1-2. – English 1982: The Civilizing Process. Oxford: Blackwell.
- Elias, Norbert & Eric Dunning 1986: Quest for Excitement. Sport and Leisure in the Civilizing Process. Oxford: Blackwell.
- Elias, Norbert 1989: Studien über die Deutschen. Machtkämpfe und Habitusentwicklung im 19. und 20. Jahrhundert. Frankfurt/ Main: Suhrkamp. – English 1996: The Germans. Power Struggles and the Development of Habitus in the 19th and 20th Centuries. Cambridge: Polity.
- Foucault, Michel 1975: Surveiller et punir. La naissance de la prison. Paris: Gallimard. – English 1975: Discipline and Punish. Harmondsworth: Penguin.
- Gaulhofer, Karl 1930: Die Fußhaltung. Ein Beitrag zur Stilgeschichte der menschlichen Bewegung. Kassel: Rudolph. Reprint Netherlands: Jan-Luiting-Stiftung 1969.
- Guttmann, Allen 1978: From Ritual to Record. New York: Columbia University Press.
- Guttmann, Allen 1996: The Erotic in Sports. New York: Columbia University Press.
- Guttmann, Allen 2004: Sports: The First Five Millennia. Amherst & Boston: University of Massachusetts Press.
- Hall, Edward T. 1966: The Hidden Dimension. New York: Anchor.
- Hall, Edward T. 1984: The Dance of Life. The Other Dimension of Time. Garden City/New York: Anchor/ Doubleday, 2nd.ed.
- Hoberman, John M. 1984: Sport and Political Ideology. Austin: University of Texas Press.
- Horkheimer, Max & Theodor W. Adorno 1947: Dialektik der Aufklärung. Philosophische Fragmente. Frankfurt/M.: Fischer 1971. – English 1997: Dialectic of Enlightenment. London: Verso.
- Kamper, Dietmar & Christoph Wulf 1982 (eds.): Die Wiederkehr des Körpers. Frankfurt/Main: Suhrkamp.
- Kleinschmidt, Harald 1989: Tyrocinium militare. Militärische Körperhaltungen und -bewegungen im Wandel zwischen dem 14. und dem 18. Jahrhundert. Stuttgart: Autorenverlag.
- Kleinschmidt, Harald 2013: Wie die Nase zum Riechorgan wurde. Berlin: Lit.
- Korsgaard, Ove 1982: Kampen om kroppen. Dansk idræts historie gennem 200 år [Struggling about the body. Danish sport history through 200 years]. Copenhagen: Gyldendal.
- Kuwahara, Makiko 2005: Tattoo an anthropology
- Leseth, Anne Birgitte 2004: Culture of Movement. Walkers, Workers and Fitness Performers in Dar Es Salaam. Oslo: Norwegian University of Sport and Physical Education.
- Lippe, Rudolf zur 1974: Naturbeherrschung am Menschen. Frankfurt/M.: Suhrkamp, vols.1-2.
- Mauss, Marcel 1934: "Les techniques du corps." – English 1973: "Techniques of the Body." In: Economy and Society, 2: 70-88.
- Merleau-Ponty, Maurice 1945: Phénoménologie de la perception. Paris: Gallimard. – English 1962: Phenomenology of Perception. London: Routledge and Kegan Paul.
- Nielsen, Niels Kayser 1993: Krop og oplysning. Om kropskultur i Danmark 1780-1900 [Body and enlightenment. About body culture in Denmark 1780-1900]. Odense: Odense Universitetsforlag.
- Nielsen, Niels Kayser 2005: Body, Sport and Society in Norden – Essays in Cultural History. Århus: Aarhus University Press.
- Nitschke, August 1975 (ed.): Verhaltenswandel in der industriellen Revolution. Stuttgart: Kohlhammer
- Nitschke, August & Hans Wieland 1981 (eds.): Die Faszination und Wirkung aussereuropäischer Tanz- und Sportformen. Ahrensburg: Czwalina.
- Nitschke, August 1987: Bewegungen in Mittelalter und Renaissance. Düsseldorf: Schwann.
- Nitschke, August 1989: Körper in Bewegung. Gesten, Tänze und Räume im Wandel der Geschichte. Stuttgart: Kreuz.
- Nitschke, August et al. 2009 (eds.): Überraschendes Lachen, gefordertes Weinen. Gefühle und Prozesse, Kulturen und Epochen im Vergleich. Wien: Böhlau.
- Plessner, Helmuth 1941: Lachen und Weinen. Eine Untersuchung der Grenzen menschlichen Verhaltens. Bern. New ed. in: Plessner: Gesammelte Schriften. Frankfurt/M.: Suhrkamp 1982, vol. 7: 201-387.
- Rabinbach, Anson 1992: The Human Motor. Energy, Fatigue and the Origins of Modernity. Los Angeles: University of California Press.
- Rigauer, Bero 1969: Sport und Arbeit. Frankfurt/M.: Suhrkamp. – English 1981: Sport and Work. New York: Columbia University Press.
- Riordan, James 1977: Sport in Soviet Society. Cambridge: Cambridge University Press.
- Roubal, Petr 2007: Embodying Communism: Politics of Mass Gymnastics in Post-War Eastern Europe. Budapest: Central European University, dissertation in history.
- Schivelbusch, Wolfgang 1977: Geschichte der Eisenbahnreise. Zur Industrialisierung von Raum und Zeit im 19. Jahrhundert. München: Hanser. – English 1986: The Railway Journey. The Industrialization and Perception of Time and Space. Berkeley: University of California Press.
- Sideris, Athanasios 2005: "The Athletic Body: Image and Power", Imeros 5.1, pp. 287–308.
- Sironen, Esa 1995: Urheilun aika ja paikka [The time and space of sport.] Jyväskylä: LIKES.
- Sloterdijk, Peter 1998/2004: Sphären. Plurale Sphärologie. Bd.1-3. Frankfurt/M.: Suhrkamp.
- Theweleit, Klaus 1977: Männerphantasien. Frankfurt/M.: Roter Stern. – English: Male fantasies. Minneapolis: University of Minnesota Press 1996.
- Vertinsky, Patricia & John Bale 2004 (eds.): Sites of Sport. Space, Place and Experience. London & New York: Routledge.
- Vertinsky, Patricia & Sherry McKay 2004 (eds.): Disciplining Bodies in the Gymnasium. Memory, Monument, Modernism. London & New York: Routledge.
- Vestergård Madsen, Bo 2003: Oplysning i bevægelse. Kultur, krop og demokrati i den folkelige gymnastik [Enlightenment in movement. Culture, body and democracy in popular gymnastics] Århus: Klim.
- Vigarello, Georges 1978: Le corps redressé. Historire d'un pouvoir pédagogique. Paris: Pierre Delarge.
- Vigarello, Georges 1988: Une histoire culturelle du sport. Techniques d'hier et aujourd'hui. Paris: R. Lafont & Revue EPS.
- Virilio, Paul 1977: Vitesse et politique. Paris: Galilée. – English 1986: Speed and Politics: An Essay on Dromology. New York: Semiotext(e).
- Wedemeyer-Kolwe, Bernd 2004: "Der neue Mensch". Körperkultur im Kaiserreich und in der Weimarer Republik. Würzburg: Königshausen & Neumann.
