= James Riordan (writer) =

English writer and sportsman (1936–2012)

- Born: 10 October 1936; Portsmouth, England
- Died: 11 February 2012 (aged 75); Portsmouth, England
- Education: University of Birmingham
- Occupations: Novelist; broadcaster; sports historian; Russian scholar
- Height: 6 ft 5 in (1.96 m)

James Riordan (10 October 1936 – 11 February 2012) was an English novelist, broadcaster, sports historian, and Russian scholar.

He was well known for his work Sport in Soviet Society, the first academic look at sport in the Soviet Union, and for his children's novels.

He claims to have been the first Briton to play football in the USSR, playing for FC Spartak Moscow in 1963. There are, however, no documents, match reports or eyewitness accounts that support his claim, and many details in the story were inaccurate.

== Life and career ==
Born in Portsmouth in 1936, James Riordan learned to speak Russian during National Service training in the Royal Air Force from 1955 to 1957. In 1960, he graduated in Russian Studies at the University of Birmingham, before qualifying as a teacher at the London Institute of Education.

In 1963, Riordan studied at the Communist party higher school in Moscow; he was an avowed Communist and was one of the few English students at the school.

His autobiography Comrade Jim: The Spy Who Played for Spartak, published in 2008, includes an account of his games for Spartak Moscow; some Russian commentators have questioned these claims.

When he returned to England, he became lecturer at Bradford University before moving on to the University of Surrey at Guildford where he became head of the Russian Department and was awarded a personal professorship. In 1980, he was the Olympic attaché for the British Olympic Association of the 1980 Moscow Olympics. He held an honorary doctorate of Grenoble University and was President (2003-5) and later Fellow of the European Committee for Sports History.

His 2008 novel The Sniper tells the story of Soviet sniper Tania Chernova and is based on Riordan's interviews with the subject.

He has also made a study of "The Death Match" — the 1943 non-official association football match between Soviet POWs and soldiers of the Wehrmacht — and has written a scholarly article and a children's novel, Match of Death, on the subject.

== Selected bibliography ==
=== Autobiography ===
- Comrade Jim: The Spy Who Played for Spartak (Harper Perennial, 2009). ISBN 0007251157

=== Non-fiction ===
- Sport in Soviet Society: Development of Sport and Physical Education in Russia and the USSR (Cambridge Univ. Press, 1977). ISBN 0-521-21284-7
- European Cultures of Sport (Intellect, 2001). ISBN 9781841500140

=== Children's novels ===
- The Secret Castle (Silver Burdett, 1980) ISBN 9780382065088
- Sweet Clarinet (Oxford University Press, 1998). ISBN 9780192717955
- The Prisoner (Oxford University Press, 1999). ISBN 9780192718129
- When the Guns Fall Silent (Oxford University Press, 2000). ISBN 9780192718501
- War Song (Oxford University Press, 2001). ISBN 9780192718549
- Match of Death (Oxford University Press, 2002). ISBN 978-0-19-275268-0
- The Gift (Oxford University Press, 2004). ISBN 9780192753601
- Escape from War (Kingfisher, 2005). ISBN 9780753409718
- Rebel Cargo (Frances Lincoln Children's Books, 2007). ISBN 9781845077747
- The Sniper (Frances Lincoln Children's Books, 2008). ISBN 9781845078843
- Blood Runner (Frances Lincoln Children's Books, 2011). ISBN 9781845079345

=== Children's anthologies ===
- Mistress of the Copper Mountain: Folk Tales from the Urals (Muller, 1974). ISBN 9780584623918
- Tales from Central Russia: Russian Tales (Kestrel, 1976). Illustrated by Krystyna Turska. ISBN 0722651309
- Tales from Tartary: Russian Takes Volume Two (Kestrel, 1978). Illustrated by Anthony Colbert. ISBN 0670691569
- Tales of King Arthur (Hamlyn, 1982). Illustrated by Victor Ambrus. ISBN 0600353524
- The Woman in the Moon and Other Tales of Forgotten Heroines (Hutchinson, 1985). Illustrated by Angela Barrett. ISBN 0-8037-0194-2
- Russian Gypsy Tales (Interlink Books, 1985). ISBN 9780862410827
- An Illustrated Treasury of Fairy and Folk Tales (Hamlyn, 1986). ISBN 9780600310778
- The Wild Swans (Hutchinson, 1987). Illustrated by Helen Stratton. ISBN 9780091725495
- Folk-tales of the British Isles (Raduga Publishers, 1987) ISBN 9785050010056
- The Sun Maiden and the Crescent Moon: Siberian Folk Tales (Interlink, 1989). ISBN 9781623718817
- The Barefoot Book of Stories from the Sea (Barefoot Books Ltd., 1996). Illustrated by Amanda Hall. ISBN 1-898000-09-3
- The Twelve Labours of Hercules (Frances Lincoln, 1998). Illustrated by Christina Balit. ISBN 9780711213913
- The Storytelling Star: Tales of the Sun, the Moon and the Stars (Pavilion Books Limited, 1999). Illustrated by Amanda Hall. ISBN 1-86205-202-6
- The Young Oxford Book of Football Stories (Oxford University Press, 2000). ISBN 9780192750600
- Russian Folk-Tales (Oxford University Press, 2000). Illustrated by Andrew Breakspear. ISBN 0-19-274536-0

=== As editor ===
- Kon, Igor & Riordan, James (eds.). Sex and Russian Society. Bloomington: Indiana University Press, 1993. ISBN 9780253332011
- Riordan, James (ed.). Sport under Communism. Montreal: McGill-Queen's University Press, 1978. ISBN 0-7735-0505-9.
- Riordan, James & Krüger, Arnd (eds.). The international politics of sport in the twentieth century. London: Routledge, 1999. ISBN 0-419-21160-8
- James Riordan & Krüger, Arnd (eds.). European cultures of sport: examining the nations and regions. Bristol: Intellect, 2003. ISBN 1-8415-0014-3
- Krüger, Arnd & Riordan, James (eds). The story of worker sport. Champaign, Ill.: Human Kinetics, 1996. ISBN 0-87322-874-X

=== As translator ===
- Chinghiz Aitmatov. Jamilia. London: Telegram Books, 2007. ISBN 9781846590320
- Anton Chekhov. Boys. Moscow: Progress Publishers, 1979. ISBN 9780714713915

== Literary awards ==
Riordan's first novel Sweet Clarinet won the NASEN Award, and was shortlisted for the Whitbread Children's Book Award. Match of Death won the South Lanarkshire Book Award. The Gift was also shortlisted for the NASEN Award.
