= Matthias Marschik =

Austrian cultural studies scholar, media expert and sport historian

.

Matthias Marschik (born 1957) is an Austrian cultural studies scholar, media expert and sport historian.

== Life ==
Marschik was born in Vienna. After his Abitur at the Jesuit secondary school Albertus-Magnus-Schule in 1975, Marschik studied law, psychology and art history at the University of Vienna until 1983. After his civil service at the psycho-biological research station of the Psychiatric University Hospital Vienna General Hospital he became a staff member of the Verein für Konsumenteninformation in 1986 while continuing to study psychology. From 1987 on, he worked as a freelancer for newspapers and magazines in Austria.

In 1990, Marschik obtained his doctorate on the topic Literatur gegen Therapie. The following year he was co-founder of the social science research institute Institut für biologische Sozialwissenschaft and from 1991 to 1996, he was a research assistant at the Vienna 'Institut für Schreibpädagogik und Schreibtherapie. In 2003, he completed his habilitation as privatdozent at the Faculty of Social Sciences of the University of Linz; his subject was contemporary history with special emphasis on cultural studies. He holds further visiting professorships and teaching positions at the universities of Vienna, Klagenfurt, Linz, Salzburg and Zurich for among others, psychology, media studies, artistic and industrial design and contemporary history. In his publications he deals with Alltagsgeschichte, especially in the history of sport.

Marschik's special merit is that he introduced Cultural Studies into the history of sport.

== Awards ==
- 1992: Award of the Theodor Körner-Preises for science and art
- 1997: Promotional Prize of the City of Vienna for Science
- 2002: Fellow of the European Committee for Sports History
- 2007: Award of the '"Herbert-Steiner-Preises"

== Publications ==
- Vom Herrenspiel zum Männersport. Die ersten Jahre des Wiener Fußballs. Vienna 1997. ISBN 978-3-85132-151-7.
- with Roman Horak: Das Stadion – Facetten des Fussballkonsums in Österreich. Eine empirische Untersuchung. Vienna 1997. ISBN 978-3-85114-233-4.
- with Doris Sottopietra: Erbfeinde und Haßlieben. Konzept und Realität Mitteleuropas im Sport. Münster/Hamburg/London 2000. ISBN 978-3-8258-5093-7.
- Heldenbilder. Kulturgeschichte der österreichischen Aviatik. Münster/Hamburg/London 2000. ISBN 978-3-8258-6462-0.
- Frauenfussball und Maskulinität. Geschichte – Gegenwart – Perspektiven. Münster/Hamburg/London 2003. ISBN 978-3-8258-6787-4.
- Massen, Mentalitäten, Männlichkeit : Fußballkulturen in Wien. 2005. ISBN 978-3-902416-03-2.
- with Andreas Tröscher und Edgar Schütz: Das große Buch der österreichischen Fußballstadien. Göttingen 2007. ISBN 978-3-89533-581-5.
- Cultural studies und Nationalsozialismus. Aspekte eines Geschichtsbildes. Vienna/Berlin 2011. ISBN 978-3-85132-576-8.
- with Georg Spitaler: Leo Schidrowitz. Autor und Verleger, Sexualforscher und Sportfunktionär. Hentrich & Hentrich, Berlin 2015. ISBN 978-3-95565-093-3.
- with Rolf Sachsse: Rauchende Sportler. Ein obszönes Sujet. Verlagshaus Hernals, Vienna 2017. ISBN 978-3-902975-52-2.
- Depicting Hakoah. Images of a Zionist Sports Club in Interwar Vienna. In Historical Social Research, 43 (2018) 2. doi:10.12759/hsr.43.2018.2.129-147.
- with Christian Koller (ed.): Die ungarische Räterepublik 1919. Innenansichten – Außenperspektiven – Folgewirkungen. Vienna: Promedia, 2018
