= Henning Eichberg =

German sociologist and historian

- Born: 1 December 1942; Schweidnitz, Province of Lower Silesia, German Reich
- Died: 22 April 2017 (aged 74); Odense, Denmark

Academic work
- Discipline: history and sociology
- Institutions: University of Southern Denmark
- Main interests: body culture studies

Henning Eichberg (born 1 December 1942 in Schweidnitz, Province of Lower Silesia, German Reich; d. 22 April 2017 in Odense, Denmark) was a German sociologist and historian, teaching at the University of Southern Denmark in Odense. He became notable by his contributions to the philosophy of body culture and by his political radical writings on folk and nation.

Henning Eichberg is the father of the composer Søren Nils Eichberg.

== History of behaviour and philosophy of body culture ==
Eichberg received his academic degrees in the field of history in Bochum and in sociology in Stuttgart. At the University of Stuttgart, he was a scholar and companion of August Nitschke de:August Nitschke in developing the Historical Behaviour Studies (Historische Verhaltensforschung). In 1982, he became professor at the University of Odense, later at the University of Copenhagen, developing the Danish school of body culture studies.

During the 1970s, Eichberg studied sport and popular culture in Indonesia and during the 1980s in Libya, paving the way for international comparative studies of body culture. He established the term of "body culture" in international anthropology and history. His methodological main contributions to this field were the configurational analysis (Konfigurationsanalyse) of movement cultures and the research in their inner contradictions, the so-called trialectics of body culture. He also initiated the so-called Eichberg-Mandell-Guttmann theory of the specific modernity of sport, understanding sport as a pattern of industrial productivity: "There were games and athletics in ancient Greece, but no sport." Eichberg contributed to the critical study of Olympism as a neo-colonial (→neo-colonialism) enterprise and promoted the study of popular games as alternative. Sociologists have placed Eichberg's "materialistic phenomenology" at the intersection of Norbert Elias, Michel Foucault, and the Frankfurt School of Critical Theory.

In 1987, Eichberg co-founded the Institut International d'Anthropologie Corporelle (Rennes/France), in 2002 the Centre for the Study of Body Culture (Tsukuba/Japan), and in 2005 the International Network for the Marxist Study of Sport. Eichberg's contributions to "bodily democracy" got impact on the international study and politics of Sport for all. His body-cultural writings were translated and especially influential in Finland and East Asia.

Besides the philosophy of sport and body culture, others of Eichberg's topics have also received international attention.

- History of military technology: Eichberg analyzed the fortification of the Early Modern bastionary type as a configurational expression of social geometry, characterizing the nascent territorial state.
- History of laughter: The cultural change of laughter and smile in industrial modernity followed the change of configurations from popular carnival to the seriousness of sportive strain under the premises of productive achievement.
- Labyrinth: Eichberg described the history of the labyrinth as a configurational change of folk running, play and game, contrasting the straight lines of modern sport facilities.
- Folk mythology: Eichberg wrote the history of the Silesian mountain spirit Rübezahl, changing gestalt from shamanic spirit in early popular culture to modern social gift-bringer and revolutionary figure.

== Radical writing on folk and nationalism ==
In Germany, Eichberg became known by his radical writings about nationalism and the philosophy of "the people" (German Volk, Nordic folk).

In his youth, Eichberg engaged on the radical right wing, contributing from 1961 currently to the neo-fascist monthly Nation Europa. Around 1970, he acted as founder and leading intellectual of the "New Right" and later on as a speaker of the "National revolutionary movement" in Germany. Regarding the "German question" (Deutsche Fragede:Deutsche Frage) as open and potentially revolutionary, these circles opposed the dominating two-Germanies policy and propagated a "third way" (→Third Way (centrism), →Third Position) between East and West. Renouncing from the conservative and anti-democratic "Old Right", Eichberg and the National Revolutionaries referred to anti-Nazi intellectuals of the Weimar Republic like Ernst Niekisch, Karl Otto Paetel de:Karl Otto Paetel and A. Paul Weber de:A. Paul Weber as well as to the anti-Hitler resistance of 20 July 1944.

During the 1970s, Eichberg dissociated himself from his earlier right-wing positions. He expressed self-critique against the "Eurofascism" of his youth and turned towards Third World studies and anti-colonial solidarity. Eichberg launched the concepts of "liberation nationalism" (→Types of nationalism) and "ethno-pluralism", opposing Western and European eurocentrism. Entering into discussions with the New Left, he commented: "National is revolutionary" and "Who does not want to talk about the peoples, should silence about the human being". Eichberg's contributions about national identity and the "Balkanization of everyone" were now published by periodicals from socialist, anti-authoritarian, and anarchist milieus.

== Towards ecology and socialism ==
During the mid-1970s, Eichberg turned to ecological criticism and engaged in the nascent Green movement, among others by critical studies on the "automobile society" and on the "container architecture" of sports. This became influential for the critical study of social alienation in sport architecture.

Eichberg contributed between 1980 and 2002 to the journal Wir Selbst de:Wir selbst, which tried to build bridge between right-wing national revolutionaries, New Left intellectuals and ecologists. Together with the peace researcher Alfred Mechtersheimer who was at that time member of the German Parliament for the Green party, he founded the peace committee Friedenskomitee 2000, launching the concept of "national pacifism".

After his emigration to Denmark in 1982, Eichberg engaged in Danish socialist milieus, held philosophical courses in socialist summer camps and contributed to left-wing periodicals. Eichberg was appointed as member of the cultural commission of the Socialist People's Party (Denmark) (SF) and published program texts on socialist culture and sport. By studies on the socialist term of "folk" and "the people", he extended the study of popular culture towards a theory of "the people of democracy".

Eichberg was especially active in the milieu of Danish People's Academies (folke-højskoler), which relate themselves to the democratic revival of 1848 and the romantic populism (→romantic nationalism) of the poet N. F. S. Grundtvig. He was commentator in Højskolebladet and gave courses for foreign Folk Academy students. This influenced his "theory of the people", based on Grundtvig, Johann Gottfried Herder and Martin Buber. At the 60th anniversary of Eichberg, a Danish festschrift was published collecting critical contributions about "folk" and the "people".

== Critique and controversies ==
In the field of body culture studies, Eichberg's theory of the specific modernity of sport as a pattern of productivity was met by critique from the mainstream of sport history. German sociologists of the established "sport development aid" (Sporthilfede:Stiftung Deutsche Sporthilfe) also opposed his critique of "sport export" and his studies in popular games, the promotion of traditional games being described as Third World romanticism.

In Germany, Eichberg became politically controversial because of his involvement in the "New Right" of the early 1970s. Some authors doubted his change from the right wing to left-wing positions. They pointed to the reception of the term "ethnopluralism" in milieus of the extreme Right. Eichberg was also distrusted for his meetings with Muammar al-Gaddafi. Eichberg was said to act as "godfather" for a certain anti-American and anti-capitalist left wing - German Social Democrats (SPD), Socialists and Greens -, who followed a hidden right-wing, nationalist agenda. This interpretation met, however, sharp critique from the side of left-wing anti-fascists.

Critics from the right wing accused Eichberg of overstating the structural contradictions between the state and the people. By giving priority to the "folk", the authority of the state (→state (polity), →nation state) would be damaged.

In Denmark, leaders of the Olympic sport organisation opposed the sports critique raised by Eichberg and of the Institute of Sport Research, where he was working, as "leftism" and "cultural radicalism". The Conservative minister of culture, Brian Mikkelsen, deprived the institute in 2003 of public funding, which it had received during 25 years, and entered into a sharp debate with Eichberg in the media.

== Bibliography ==
Eichberg published about 50 books, most of them about the history and cultural sociology of body culture (physical culture) and sport. Others treat the history of early modern military technology (→fortification), Indonesian studies, and studies in democracy, ethnic minorities and national identity (→cultural identity). Main publications:

- Der Weg des Sports in die industrielle Zivilisation. [The way of sport into industrial civilization, German] Baden-Baden 1973
- Militär und Technik. [Military and technology, German] Düsseldorf 1976
- Leistung, Spannung, Geschwindigkeit. [Achievement, suspense, speed; German] Stuttgart 1978
- Nationale Identität. [National identity, German] München 1978
- Festung, Zentralmacht und Sozialgeometrie. [Fortification, central power and social geometry; German] Köln 1989
- 身体文化のイマジネーション： デンマークにおける「身体の知」 [Imaginations of body culture, Japanese] Tokyo 1997
- Body Cultures. London 1998
- The People of Democracy. Århus 2004
- Bodily Democracy. Towards a Philosophy of Sport for All. London 2010
- Minderheit und Mehrheit. [Minority and majority, German] Münster 2011
- 身體文化研究 -由下而上的人類運動現象學。莊珮琪、李明宗譯。新北市：臺灣身體文化學會、康德出版社。 [The Study of Body Culture – Towards a Bottom-Up Phenomenology of Human Movement, Chinese] Taipei 2015
- Questioning Play. London 2016
