= John Hoberman =

American historian

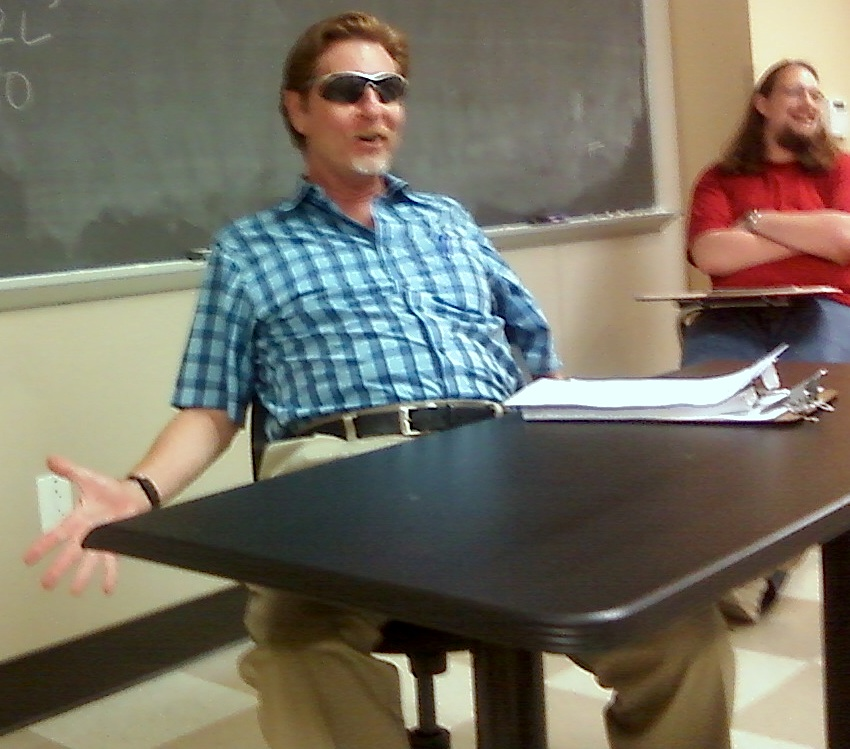
Dr. Hoberman greeting students before his "Bad Blood" class, which featured texts from Darwin's Athletes and Testosterone Dreams (2009)

John Milton Hoberman is a Professor of Germanic languages within the Department of Germanic Studies at the University of Texas at Austin. He is the author of numerous books and articles on sports, specifically on their cultural impact, their relationship with race, and the issue of doping.

He is a European cultural and intellectual historian, who has interests in sports science and the history of racial ideas. He has published nearly one hundred sports articles and books in American newspapers and magazines and in Der Spiegel. As he is fluent in Scandinavian languages as well as German, he was e.g. co-editor for the North American sport historians of their special issue on 'German sports history. He is a Fellow of the European Committee for Sports History.

== Writings ==
His book Testosterone Dreams (2005) is a history of the use of hormone treatments for lifestyle and performance enhancement during the last century, in the context of an analysis of modern society's ever-increasing use of chemical enhancements in general and its effect on human self-image. It focuses in particular on the early commercial marketing of the hormone testosterone, which is considered representative of all the performance-enhancing drugs that followed it.

Darwin's Athletes (1997) explores the relationship between sport and race. His thesis in the book generated several negative reviews questioning his conclusions. Hoberman responded in one case defending his work.

== Bibliography ==
- John Hoberman (2005). Testosterone Dreams. California: University of California Press. ISBN 0-520-22151-6.
- John Hoberman (1997). Darwin's Athletes: How Sport Has Damaged Black America and Preserved the Myth of Race. Boston: Houghton Mifflin. ISBN 0-395-82291-2.
- John Hoberman (1992). Mortal Engines: The Science of Performance and the Dehumanization of Sport. New York: The Free Press. ISBN 0-02-914765-4.
- John Hoberman (1986). The Olympic Crisis: Sport, Politics, and the Moral Order. New Rochelle, New York: Aristide D. Caratzas, Publisher. ISBN 0-89241-224-0.
- John Hoberman (1984). Sport and Political Ideology. Austin: The University of Texas Press. ISBN 0-292-77588-1.
- John Hoberman & Arnd Krüger (eds.). Journal of sport history 17(2) 1990 (Special Issue: 'German sports historiography')
