= Configurational analysis =

In cultural and social studies, configurations are patterns of behaviour, movement (→movement culture) and thinking, which research observes when analysing different cultures and/ or historical changes. The term “configurations” is mostly used by comparative anthropological studies and by cultural history. Configurational analysis became a special method by the Stuttgart school of Historical Behaviour Studies during the 1970s and later by body culture studies in Denmark.

Configurational analysis is marked by its distance towards the history of ideas and intentions, which are conceived as mainstreams in historical studies. Configurations of human behaviour and movement have attracted special attention in the framework of phenomenology and particularly in materialist phenomenology.

== Configurations in earlier cultural studies ==
Configurations in different cultures were studied since early twentieth century.

Ruth Benedict (1934) contributed to the anthropology of Native Americans by using the term of “configurations” as a translation of German “Gestalt de:Gestalt”. Configuration denoted a whole of social attitudes, practices and beliefs and was nearly identical with “culture”. It was used for comparison – between the Hopi Indians and the Indians of the prairies, between Japanese and Western culture – and in a perspective of cultural relativism: Each culture has configurations of its own.

Gaston Bachelard (1938) used the term ”diagram” to describe an order of conceived reality both in scientific and in literary understanding. This was his key to a "materialist psychoanalysis". Bachelard’s approach became later a source of inspiration for Michel Foucault.

Norbert Elias (1939, 1970) described certain patterns of relations between human beings as figuration – in English: ”configuration” – becoming visible in play of cards, dance and football. He described these configurations as das sich wandelnde Muster, das die Spieler miteinander bilden (the changing pattern, which players form with each other), Spannungsgefüge (relations of suspense), Interdependenz der Spieler (interdependence of players), and das fluktuierende Spannungsgleichgewicht, das Hin und Her einer Machtbalance (the fluctuating balance of suspense, the to-and-fro of a balance of power). This became a key to his sociology of civilization.

Michel Foucault (1966) used the term la configuration in historical studies of philosophy, in order to characterize “the order of the things”, patterns of knowledge changing in epistemological disruptions. The configurations of savoir changed, according to Foucault, in following historical steps:

The Renaissance focused on the chains of similarities, going from sign to sign. Miguel de Cervantes shaped an ironical picture of this configuration by the phantasmas of Don Quixote (part 1 - 1605).

The 18th century constructed the tableau as a universal grammar. On this base, Linné constructed the genealogical trees of plants and animals as a tableau of life. An ironical picture of this configuration was given by Laurence Sterne in his The Life and Opinions of Tristram Shandy, Gentleman (part 1 - 1759).

The 19th century discovered progress and evolution – in life science as natural history, in economy as production, and in language as linguistic history. On the background of these modern configurations, which took their form around 1800, individual subjectivity was constructed, as well as the dynamic of industrial life developed.

There are indicators that these configurations may disappear or transform again in a post-modern age.

== Configurations in historical behaviour studies ==
Configurational analysis (in German Konfigurationsanalyse) became a particular methodological approach in the framework of Historical Behaviour Studies, as they were developed at the University of Stuttgart during the 1970s by the historians August Nitschke and Henning Eichberg. Nitschke analyzed raum-zeitliche Muster (patterns of space and time) and Körperanordnungen (orders of the body) as “configurations” when comparing patterns of art and patterns of social behavior. Configurations were similarities, analogies and changing patterns of figures in a given space.

This analytical approach was comparable to concepts, which in recent time have challenged historiography: mentality (Georges Duby), affect control (Norbert Elias) (→Affect control theory), perception (Lucien Febvre), structural thinking (Claude Lévi-Strauss), needs (David McClelland), and interaction (George Herbert Mead). The configurational approach contrasted deliberately with the mainstream of historiography explaining history by the aims of its actors (pragmatism), as an expression of weltanschauung (psychology and history of ideas) or by interests (in social history).

The configurational analysis was especially applied to comparative and historical studies of sport and dance as indicators of social change. The comparative analysis of athletics, ball games, equestrianism, martial arts, gymnastics, and dance showed some common configurations as: the functional parceling of space, a new dynamic of “progress” and speed, the modern taste of suspense, the principle of competition, and the production of result tables. The configurations of movement culture prefigured the patterns of productivity orientation, which characterized the Industrial Age.

The applied concept of “configuration” was here different from "system" (→cultural system) (being more static and systematic, and related to the negative term of the non-systematic), from “style” (being more aesthetic and having undertones of taste, subjectivity and stylization), and from “structure” (having undertones of “the functional”, as a heritage from structural functionalism in sociology). In contrast to these terms, configuration denotes a more dynamic pattern in change.

Configurations as patterns of behaviour, movement and thinking reflect man's perception of reality. They give an epochal pattern of perception which concurrently defines a framework for action. But in no way they describe the whole reality of an epoch. Furthermore, their power to explain individual actions is limited. The epochal "reality" is no straitjacket which does not allow freedom of action. Nevertheless, in each epoch there are typical ways to act or to behave, to move or to think. They correspond with the way people perceive reality. Acting or thinking in this way may be right or wrong – it is typical anyway.

== Configurations in body culture studies ==
Studies of body culture, which spread in Denmark during the 1980s, developed the configurational analysis further, revealing inner tensions and contradictions of a given society. The configurative approach was applied to the analysis and especially to comparison of different fields of activities: popular festivity, fitness culture (→physical fitness), sportive and non-sportive ball games, sport racing and parkour, different outdoor activities, and different health cultures. Configurational analysis focused on bodily movement in time and space, on the energy of movement, on interpersonal relations, and on the objectification of movement. Above this basis, analysis included the superstructure of institutions and ideas (→Base and superstructure), which organize and reflect collective actions and interests.

Time of bodily movement is marked, among others, by contradictions between acceleration and slowness – between living rhythm and mechanical pace – between linear-abstract and irreversible time – between cyclical, progressing and situational time. Historical change saw for instance the transformation from the noble exercises of the eighteenth century with their circulating and formally measured patterns to modern gymnastics and sports with their patterns of speed, acceleration, and flow, which characterized industrial behaviour more generally.

Space of bodily movement is characterized by contradictions between the straight line and the labyrinth – between connection and parcellation of spaces – between geometrical and directed space – between space, place and intermediary space. Foucault's study of the panopticon as a specific modern way of organising the space of movement and bodily visibility around 1800 showed the societal depth of this analysis.

Energy of bodily movement consists of a multiplicity of different atmospheres, radiations, moods and modes of attunement. Modern suspension (suspense, tension, thrill, excitement – in German Spannung') emerged in eighteenth and nineteenth century’s boxing and ball games at the same time as it appeared in detective novels. This coincidence was illustrative for the configurational change towards industrial society. Social energy was also illustrated by the study of laughter in the tradition of Mikhail Bakhtin's analysis of Renaissance society.

Interpersonal relations in bodily movement tell about power and gender – about winners and losers – about you- and we-relations in motion. The study of sports has especially been enriched by the attention to gender unbalances in body culture.

Objectification of bodily movement is especially characteristic for modern body cultures. Bodily movement is reified in a tension between process and result – between social production, reproduction and a-productive encounters in bodily activity – between producing data or pictures by movement. The production of records by modern sports has been a central point for understanding modern industrial behaviour.

Above these basic body-cultural processes, body culture shows patterns of organizational and institutional character as well as the meanings and ideas, which are ascribed to bodily practices. Mainstream studies of sport often over-emphasize these superstructures (→Base and superstructure), while the configurational analysis of body culture gives priority to the focus on bodily practice, in the framework of a materialist phenomenology.

== Further configurational approaches ==
Configurational analysis can be compared with other contemporary approaches in cultural and social studies.

Pierre Bourdieu (1966/67, 1979) launched the concept of ”habitus” to describe patterns of action, of bodily practice and presentation, of taste and aesthetic form (comparable to the Gothic style of Medieval cathedrals). Like configuration, habitus was illustrative for a certain homology, which could be found inside a given social formation or class and as distinction between different social classes.

Peter Sloterdijk (1998/99) developed a cultural ”morphology”, which described the psychosocial geometry of people’s living space and inhabitations, their world and their understanding of God. Micro- and macrospheres were related to each other by characteristic configurations.

In any of these approaches, “configuration” made it possible to compare concrete human practice – i.e. “material” bodily phenomena – with larger spheres of society and culture.

== Bibliography ==
Bachelard, Gaston 1938: La psychanalyse du feu. – English 1964: Psychoanalysis of fire. Boston: Beacon

Benedict, Ruth 1934: Patterns of Culture. Boston, New York: Houghton Mifflin

Bourdieu, Pierre 1966/67: "Champs intellectuel et projet créateur." In: Temps modernes, 22, 865-906

1979: La distinction. Paris: Minuit. – English 1984: Distinction: A Social Critique of the Judgement of Taste. London: Routledge

Dietrich, Knut 2001 (ed.): How Societies Create Movement Culture and Sport. University of Copenhagen: Institute of Exercise and Sport Sciences

Eichberg, Henning 1978: Leistung, Spannung Geschwindigkeit. Sport und Tanz im gesellschaftlichen Wandel des 18./19. Jahrhunderts. Stuttgart: Klett-Cotta

1998: Body Cultures. London: Routledge

2001: “Thinking contradictions. Towards a methodology of configurational analysis, or: How to reconstruct the societal signification of movement culture and sport.” In: Knut Dietrich (ed.): How Societies Create Movement Culture and Sport. University of Copenhagen: Institute of Exercise and Sport Sciences, 10-32.

2010: Bodily Democracy. London: Routledge

Elias, Norbert 1939: Über den Prozess der Zivilisation. Soziogenetische und psychogenetische Untersuchungen. Frankfurt/M.: Suhrkamp . – English 1982: The Civilizing Process. Oxford: Blackwell

1970: Was ist Soziologie? München: Juventa. – English 1978: What is Sociology? New York: Columbia University Press.

Foucault, Michel 1966: Les mots et les choses. Paris: Gallimard . – English 1970: The Order of Things. An Archeology of the Human Sciences. New York: Pantheon

Kalckhoff, Andreas (1982): "Historische Verhaltensforschung: Ethnologie unserer Vergangenheit. Die Konfiguration eines Aufstandes im 10. Jahrhundert", in Gehlen, Rolf & Wolf, Bernd (eds.): Werner Müller zu seinem 75.Geburtstag, Unter dem Pflaster liegt der Strand 11. Berlin: Karin Kramer.

Nitschke, August 1975: Kunst und Verhalten. Analoge Konfigurationen. Stuttgart-Bad Cannstatt: Frommann-Holzboog

1975 (ed.): Verhaltenswandel in der industriellen Revolution. Stuttgart: Kohlhammer

1981: Historische Verhaltensforschung. Stuttgart: Ulmer

Sloterdijk, Peter 1998/2004: Sphären. Plurale Sphärologie. Vols.1-3, Frankfurt/Main: Suhrkamp.
