= Andreas Kalckhoff =

German historian and writer (born 1944)

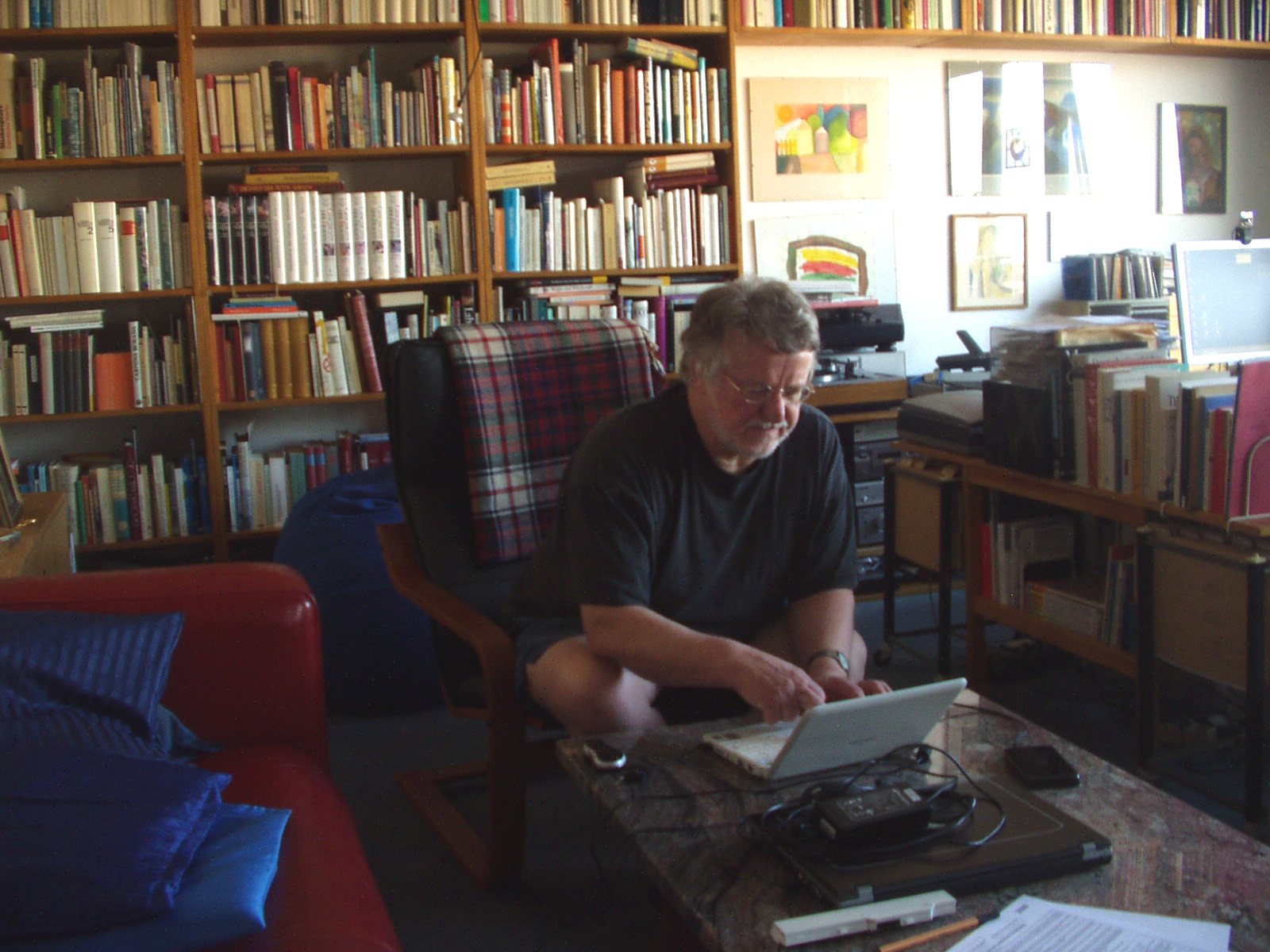
Andreas Kalckhoff 2009

Andreas Kalckhoff (18 August 1944 – 14 August 2022) was a German historian and writer.

== Early life ==
Andreas Kalckhoff was born on 18 August 1944 in Saaz, Bohemia and grew up in Munich, Bavaria.

== Education ==
Kalckhoff studied Bavarian History, medieval history and politics. In 1976, Kalckhoff was conferred a Ph.D. by Karl Bosl for a thesis on late medieval nationalism in Scotland

== Career ==
In 1977, Kalckhoff was subeditor of a historical journal until 1978. In 1978, Kalckhoff became an assistant professor at the University of Stuttgart in the Institut of Social research, department “Historical Behaviour Studies (Historische Verhaltensforschung)” until 1980. Kalckhoff is a scholar of August Nitschke.

== Personal life ==
Since 1980, Kalckhoff lives in Stuttgart working as a free journalist and writer.

== Books ==
- Kalckhoff, Andreas (1980): Richard III. Sein Leben und seine Zeit.Bergisch-Gladbach: Gustav Lübbe.
- Kalckhoff, Andreas (1983): Nacio Scottorum. Schottischer Regionalismus im Spätmittelalter. Frankfort-on-the-Main; Bern: Peter Lang.
- Kalckhoff, Andreas (1984): Fürsten-, Länder-, Bürgerwappen: Heraldik aus neun Jahrhunderten. Stuttgart: Pro Heraldica.
- Kalckhoff, Andreas (1987): Karl der Große. Verhaltensstruktur eines Herrschers. Munich: Piper.

== Sources ==
- "Andreas Kalckhoff", in: Gehlen, Rolf & Wolf, Bernd (eds): Der gläserne Zaun. Aufsätze zu Hans Peter Duerrs "Traumzeit". Frankfort-on-the-Main: Syndikat 1983, p. 315.
- "Kalckhoff, Andreas", in Braun, Hugo (ed.): Journalistenkalender 1988/89. Bonn: Ferdinand C. Mentzen 1988, p. 23.
- Kalckhoff, Andreas: Guter Rat, in Oethen, Johannes (ed.): Stuttgarter Lesebuch. Autoren stellen sich vor. Karlsruhe: Braun 1989, pp. 90–96.
- "Kalckhoff, Andreas", in Török, Imre & Grübl, Birgit (eds.): Autoren in Baden-Württemberg. Ein aktuelles Nachschlagewerk. Stuttgart: Silberburg, 1991, pp. 259–260.
