= Historical behaviour studies =

Historical behaviour studies (German: Historische Verhaltensforschung) is a field of research in cultural history and cultural anthropology and a particular methodological approach to the study of human behaviour.

== Method and object of research ==
Historical behaviour studies are a type of cultural sociology under the particular aspect of historical change. Its focal points were:

- to describe patterns of human bodily practice as rites and ceremonies, music and dance, sports and exercises, play and game, beyond ideas and weltanschauung de:Weltanschauung;
- to identify analogies between patterns of bodily behaviour, (gestures and body movement) and patterns of thinking (“Denkordnungen”);
- to compare forms of behaviour across different times and cultures by patterns and configurations rather than by meaning;
- to compare patterns of behaviour, of thinking and of mentalities (mindsets) in different fields of society, as in economic behaviour, military behaviour, concepts of natural sciences, proceedings and atmospheres in literary works, and social movements;
- to understand epochal changes of behaviour (→Periodization);
- to bridge the gap between history, sociology and anthropology.

== Institute of Social Research – the Stuttgart school ==
The Historical Behaviour Studies (Historische Verhaltensforschung) were established in 1971 by August Nitschke de:August Nitschke and Henning Eichberg as a department of the University of Stuttgart. The Department of Historical Behaviour Studies was part of the newly established Institute of Social Research, side by side with departments of social planning and social economy. Later on, historians like Johannes Burkhardt de:Johannes Burkhardt, Andreas Kalckhoff, Harald Kleinschmidt, Volker Saftien and Michael Walter joined the department. Others like Wolfgang Christian Schneider, Andreas Gestrich de:Andreas Gestrich, Mathias Beer und Katja Erdmann-Rajski worked in connection with the department and used similar methods of research.

The research of this Stuttgart school of studies in human behaviour was to a certain extent parallel to the History of Mentalities from France, to the Cultural Sociology (Kultursoziologie de:Kultursoziologie) from Germany and Denmark, and to the Historical Anthropology or Alltagsgeschichte from Germany which arose in the 1990s. Referring to Ruth Benedict, Norbert Elias and Michel Foucault, the patterns of human behaviour were called “configurations” (→Configurational analysis (Konfigurationsanalyse)).

== Analyzing historical change and cultural difference ==
The Stuttgart school of Historical Behaviour Studies directed special attention towards fundamental and abrupt changes of behavior and society, as they could be observed in the context of the Renaissance 1550–1650, of the Industrial Revolution around 1770–1820, and in cultural change around 1900–1930. Other changes were studied for the Middle Ages. These historical case studies could lead to questions concerning the significance and change of behaviour at present and in the future.

A particular characteristic of the Stuttgart studies of historical behaviour was the comparative turn towards non-Western societies like Indonesia, Japan, and China.

While the Stuttgart school generally focused on “describing” (→description) and “understanding” different forms and changes of historical behaviour, the “explanation” of cultural difference and change was discussed diversely. Eichberg emphasized the irreducible otherness (alterity) of foreign behavior; “extraneous” patterns withdraw from the explanations of the external observer and develop, also in modernity, on ways quite different from Western standard. Nitschke de:August Nitschke tried to find explanations for the historical dynamics of different cultures by models of energy and time expectation; this met with observations of self-organization (→Synergetics (Haken)) as reported in physics and biology. Common for the Stuttgart school was a skeptical distance towards the traditional explanation of historical change by ideologies, individual intentions, general social structures or one global process of sociocultural evolution.

== Influence on international research ==
The Historical Behaviour Studies contributed among others to the history of popular culture, and of peace and war, to the study of paradigm changes in natural sciences, to the history of art and of the public sphere. They had a special impact on the international study of body culture (physical culture). The Danish school of body culture studies developed the analysis of configurations – social space, social time, inter-human relations, atmospheres and emotions, and the objectifying of movement – towards the study of sport and other movement cultures (p. e. musical gesture) in diverse societies and social formations.

== Literature ==
Beer, Mathias (1990): Eltern und Kinder des späten Mittelalters in ihren Briefen. Familienleben in der Stadt des Spätmittelalters und der frühen Neuzeit. Nürnberg: Stadtarchiv Nürnberg.

Eichberg, Henning (1973): Der Weg des Sports in die industrielle Zivilisation. Baden-Baden: Nomos.

(1977) (et al.): Massenspiele. NS-Thingspiel, Arbeiterweihespiel und olympisches Zeremoniell. Stuttgart-Bad Cannstatt: Frommann-Holzboog

(1978): Leistung, Spannung Geschwindigkeit. Sport und Tanz im gesellschaftlichen Wandel des 18./ 19. Jahrhunderts. Stuttgart: Klett-Cotta

(1981): Sozialverhalten und Regionalentwicklungsplanung. Modernisierung in der indonesischen Relationsgesellschaft. Berlin: Duncker & Humblot

(1984): Die historische Relativität der Sachen. Münster: Lit

(1986) (et al.): Die Veränderung des Sports ist gesellschaftlich. Die historische Verhaltensforschung in der Diskussion. Münster: Lit

(1998): Body Cultures. London: Routledge

(2010): Bodily Democracy. London: Routledge

Erdmann-Rajski, Katja (2000): Gret Palucca: Tanz und Zeiterfahrung in Deutschland im 20. Jahrhundert: Weimarer Republik, Nationalsozialismus, Deutsche Demokratische Republik. Hildesheim, Zürich, New York: Olms.

Gestrich, Andreas (1994): Absolutismus und Öffentlichkeit. Göttingen: Vandenhoeck & Ruprecht.

(1999): Vergesellschaftungen des Menschen. Einführung in die Historische Sozialisationsforschung. Tübingen: edition diskord.

Kalckhoff, Andreas (1982): "Historische Verhaltensforschung: Ethnologie unserer Vergangenheit. Die Konfiguration eines Aufstandes im 10. Jahrhundert", in Gehlen, Rolf & Wolf, Bernd (eds.): Werner Müller zu seinem 75.Geburtstag, Unter dem Pflaster liegt der Strand 11. Berlin: Karin Kramer.

(1987): Karl der Große. Verhaltensstruktur eines Herrschers. Munich: Piper.

Kintzinger, Martin et al. (1991) (eds.): Das Andere Wahrnehmen. Beiträge zur europäischen Geschichte. August Nitschke zum 65. Geburtstag gewidmet. Cologne: Böhlau.

Kleinschmidt, Harald (1989): Tyrocinium Militare. Militärische Körperhaltungen und –bewegungen zwischen dem 14. und dem 18. Jahrhundert. Stuttgart: Autorenverlag

(2003): People on the Move. Westport: Praeger.

(2005): Perception and Action in Medieval Europe. Woodbridge: Boydell.

Nitschke, August (1972): Die Bedrohung. Ansatz einer historischen Verhaltensforschung. Stuttgart: Klett

(1975): Kunst und Verhalten. Analoge Konfigurationen. Stuttgart-Bad Cannstatt: Frommann-Holzboog.

(1975) (ed.): Verhaltenswandel in der industriellen Revolution. Stuttgart: Kohlhammer.

(1979): Revolutionen in Naturwissenschaft und Gesellschaft. Stuttgart-Bad Cannstatt: Frommann-Holzboog.

(1981): Historische Verhaltensforschung. Stuttgart: Ulmer.

(1981) (with Hans Wieland eds.): Die Faszination und Wirkung außereuropäischer Tanz- und Sportformen. Ahrensburg: Czwalina.

(1985): Junge Rebellen. Mittelalter, Neuzeit, Gegenwart: Kinder verändern die Welt. Munich: Kösel.

(1987): Bewegungen in Mittelalter und Renaissance. Düsseldorf: Schwann.

(1989): Körper in Bewegung. Stuttgart: Kreuz.

(1990) (ed.): Jahrhundertwende. Der Aufbruch in die Moderne, 1880–1930. Reinbek: Rowohlt

(1991): Die Mutigen in einem System. Wechselwirkungen zwischen Mensch und Umwelt. Ein Vergleich der Kulturen. Cologne, Weimar, Vienna: Böhlau

(1994): Die Zukunft in der Vergangenheit. Systeme in der historischen und biologischen Evolution. Munich, Zürich: Piper

(2004): Zeitmuster in der Geschichte. Was interessiert junge Chinesen an Europas Mittelalter? Cologne: Rüdiger Köppe

(2009) (co-ed.): Überraschendes Lachen, gefordertes Weinen. Gefühle und Prozesse, Kulturen und Epochen im Vergleich. Vienna: Böhlau.

Saftien, Volker (1994): Ars saltandi. Der europäische Gesellschaftstanz im Zeitalter der Renaissance und des Barock. Hildesheim, New York: Olms.

Schneider, Wolfgang Christian (1988): Ruhm, Heilsgeschehen, Dialektik. Drei kognitive Ordnungen in Geschichtsschreibung und Buchmalerei der Ottonenzeit. Hildesheim, New York: Olms.

Walter, Michael (1994): Grundlagen der Musik des Mittelalters. Schrift – Zeit – Raum. Stuttgart: Metzler.

(1995): Hitler in der Oper. Deutsches Musikleben 1919–1945. Stuttgart: Metzler

About the influence of Historical Behaviour Studies:

Lorenz, Maren (2000): Leibhaftige Vergangenheit. Einführung in die Körpergeschichte. Tübingen: Diskord.

Mallinckrodt, Rebekka (2008): Bewegtes Leben. Körpertechniken in der Frühen Neuzeit. Wiesbaden: Harrassowitz.

== See also ==
- Human behavior
- Sociology of culture
- Anthropology, Cultural Anthropology, Social Anthropology
