= Georges Vigarello =

French historian and sociologist (born 1941)

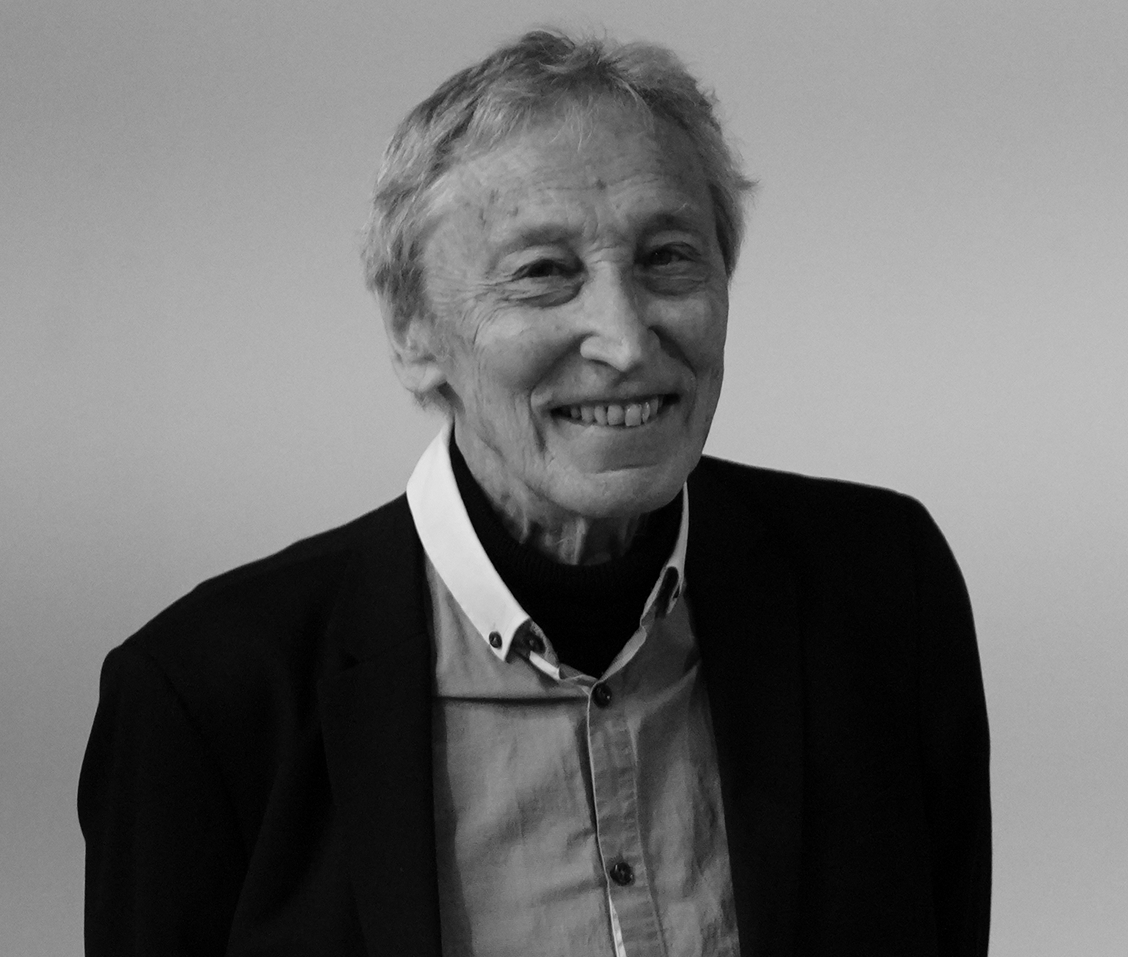
Vigarello in 2024

Georges Vigarello (born 16 June 1941) is a French historian and sociologist. He is a Research Director at the École des hautes études en sciences sociales (EHESS) of Paris. His main research interests include the sociology of the body, the history of hygiene, representations of the body over the centuries, and the social dimensions of sport.

== Background ==
Born in Monaco, Georges Vigarello initially obtained a teaching diploma (CAPES) in Sport and Physical Education, and subsequently gained an advanced teaching degree (agrégation) in philosophy.

He briefly taught at the Paris Vincennes University, then the stronghold of post-structuralism. The influence of prominent philosopher Michel Foucault is particularly visible in his first book Le corps redressé (1978). Vigarello soon developed a personal, more historically rigorous approach to the sociology of the body.

Before entering the EHESS, he held the position of Professor of Educational Studies at the Paris-Sorbonne University. He has served as a junior member of the Institut Universitaire de France (a French national agency for advanced academic research), and currently chairs the Scientific Committee of the French National Library.

The paperback edition of his books (as well as the many translations) made him known to a wider French and international audience.

== List of major publications ==
- Sarkozy, Corps et âme d’un président (Sarkozy: Body and Soul of a President), (with Olivier Mongin) Perrin, 2008
- Concepts of Cleanliness: Changing Attitudes in France since the Middle Ages, Cambridge University Press, 2008
- Histoire de la beauté, le corps et l’art d’embellir de la renaissance à nos jours (A History of Beauty: The Body and the Art of Embellishment from the Renaissance to Nowadays), Seuil, 2004
- Histoire du corps (History of the Body), three volumes, (with Alain Corbin and Jean-Jacques Courtine) (eds) Seuil, 2006
- A History of Rape: Sexual Violence in France from the 16th to the 20th Century, Polity, 2001
- Le corps redressé, Armand Colin, 2001 (first edition: Le corps redressé, Histoire D'un Pouvoir Pedagogique, Delarge, 1978)
- Passion sport, Histoire d’une culture, Textuel, 2000
