= Olympism =

Philosophy of the Olympic Games

Olympism refers to the philosophy of the Olympic Games. The fundamental principles of Olympism are outlined in the Olympic Charter.

Olympism is a philosophy that seeks to blend sport with culture, education, and international cooperation. It emphasizes the joy of effort, the educational value of good examples, social responsibility, and respect for universal ethical principles. The ultimate goal is to use sport as a means of promoting the development of humankind and preserving human dignity.

The principles of Olympism include the idea that the ability to participate in sports is a basic human right. Olympism emphasizes that individuals should have equal access to sports without discrimination and that these activities should be done in a spirit of fairness and camaraderie.

Non-discrimination is a fundamental aspect of Olympism. It holds that individuals should be able to participate in sports without facing discrimination based on factors such as race, gender, sexual orientation, religion, and socioeconomic status.

Individuals who follow or support Olympism may refer to their actions as "fostering personal development."

Some individuals have expressed skepticism towards Olympism, stating that fully achieving its ideals may not be possible. They also point to examples where the games have failed to meet their stated goals.

== Olympism in action ==
Six activities are currently included within Olympism in Action. Activities include Development through Sport, Education through Sport, Peace through Sport, Sport and the Environment, Sport for All, and Women and Sport. These activities are endorsed by the Olympic Movement.

The International Olympic Committee (IOC) supports Development through Sport by working with the United Nations (UN) and other governmental agencies to help people perceive, gain, and understand the world around them through athletics. For Education through Sports, the IOC created the Olympic Values Education Programme (OVEP) to teach its participants about the advantages of being physically active and playing sports. IOC president Thomas Bach has shown his support for Peace through Sport by stating "The Olympic athletes show the whole world that it is possible to compete with each other while living peacefully together. In this world of uncertainty that we are living in today, the Olympic Games are even more relevant than ever."

THE IOC supports the Sustainable Sport and Events (SSE) Toolkit, which provides guidance to National Olympic Committees and event organisers on host-city selection, venue construction, transportation and accommodation. Through its Sport for All initiative, the IOC promotes access to sport regardless of gender, race, or social class. Its Women in Sport programmes seek to advance gender equality through leadership development, advocacy and awareness campaigns as well as increased representation of women in decision-making roles within the Olympic Movement.
