= European Committee for Sports History =

The European Committee for Sports History (CESH) is a non-profit organisation of European sports historians. It was founded in Bordeaux in 1995, with Founding President Prof. Arnd Krüger. The motto of the organisation is 'Cognita historia futurum figurare' (you have to know history to develop the future).

== International CESH Congresses ==
CESH holds an annual international congress, where historians are invited to present and discuss their research. Congresses comprise a social programme and a social dinner, where the winner of the Early Career Award winner is announced.

The congresses have been staged in various countries: Italy (1996, 1999, 2004, 2009, 2015, 2025), Germany (2001, 2023), France (1995, 2002, 2007, 2017, 2018, 2024, 2026), Denmark (1998), Tunisia (2010), Spain (2000, 2005, 2014), Poland (1997, 2008), Greece (2003, 2014), Austria (2006), Portugal (2011, 2021), Romania (2022), Switzerland (2019), the UK (2016).

A leading sports historian is invited to give the Horst Ueberhorst Memorial Address during the international congresses of CESH in memory of Prof. Dr. Horst Ueberhorst (1925-2010) who was a pioneer in international sports history.

- 22nd International CESH Congress, 29-31 Oct 2018, in Bordeaux, France: "Sport Heritage and Patrimonial Dynamics"
- 21st International CESH Congress, 7–9 December 2017, in Strasbourg, France: "Cultural transfers and cultural mediators in sport. The Diffusion of Sport in Europe: Origins and Perspectives"
- 20th International CESH Congress, 5-7 Sept 2016, in Leicester (UK): Open Papers.
- 19th International CESH Congress, 22-24 Oct 2015, in Florence/Italy: "Sport as a Key Driver for Development in Historical Perspective"
- 18th International CESH Congress, 16-18 Oct 2014, in Edessa/Greece: "Sports and Education from Antiquity to Modern Times"
- 17th International CESH Congress, 21-23 Nov 2013, in Barcelona/Spain: "Sport in Times of Crisis"
- 16th International CESH Congress, 12-16 Oct 2011, in Estoril/Portugal: "Sport and Tourism"
- 15th International CESH Congress, 23-25 Sept 2010, in Monastir/Tunisia: "Olympic Myth and Sports Heroes"
- 14th International CESH Congress, 17-19 Sept 2009, in Pisa/Italy: "Corpo e senso del limite"
- 13th International CESH Congress 2008 in Gorzow Wlkp. Poland: "Transnational Aspects of European Sport History"
- 12th International CESH Congress, 19-22 Sept 2007, in Lorient (Brittany), France: "Sport and the Arts: Construction and Reality"
- 11th International CESH Congress 2006: 17-20 Sept 2006, Vienna, Austria: "Sport and the Construction of Identities"
- 10th International CESH Congress 2005: Sevilla, Spain: "Sport and Violence"
- 9th International CESH Congress 2004: Crotone, Italy: "Sport and Culture"
- 8th International CESH Congress 2003: Olympia, Greece
- 7th International CESH Congress 2002: 26-29 Sept, Besançon, France: "Sport and Ideology"
- 6th International CESH Congress 2001: 26-30 Sept 2001 in Göttingen, Germany: "Transformations: continuity and change in sport history"
- 5th International CESH Congress 2000: Madrid, Spain: "Sport in the Written Word (Ancient and Modern, Literature and Poetry)"
- 4th International CESH Congress 1999: 2-5 Dec 1999, Florence, Italy: "History of Sport and Culture"
- 3rd International CESH Congress 1998: 2-6 Dec 199, Copenhagen, Denmark: "History of educational institutions, physical education and sport from European perspectives"
- 2nd International CESH Congress 1997: Katowice, Poland: "European History of Sport and Tourism"
- 1st International CESH Congress 1996: 29. Nov - 1. Dec. 1996, Rome, Italy: "The common heritage of sport in Europe. The responsibility of sport history for the culture of sport"

== Scientific Journal of CESH ==
CESH has published an annual scientific journal since 2000. From 2000 to 2005, it was called Annual of CESH and published by NISH (Hanover, Germany). Since 2008, the CESH journal is entitled European Studies in Sports History. It has been published with Rouen and Le Havre University Press since 2010.

== Early Career Awards ==
Since its first congress in 1996, CESH has regularly organised an Early Career Award competition.

== College of Fellows ==
CESH has a College of Fellows which co-opts the leading European sports historians. These are capable to work in more than one European language, have published at least one monograph and have participated in several CESH congresses. In 2024, the College had 73 members from 21 countries.

James Riordan (1926-2012) previously served as President of the College of Fellows.
