= Arnd Krüger =

German sports historian

Personal information
- Born: 1 July 1944 (age 81) Mühlhausen, West Germany

Sport
- Sport: Track and field

Arnd Krüger (born July 1, 1944) is a German professor of sport studies. Krüger earned his BA (English major) from UCLA in 1967 and his PhD from the University of Cologne (Modern and Medieval History) in Germany in 1971. He attended UCLA on a track scholarship, was 10 times German champion, and represented West Germany at the 1968 Summer Olympics in the 1500 metres run, where he reached the semi-final. He was one of the first Germans to be honored as All-American for being part of the UCLA Distance Medley Relay which ran faster than the World Record in 1965.

After completing the PhD, Krüger worked for the German Sports Federation (1971–74), and the Berlin Teachers' Training College (1974–78) and taught part-time at the German National Coaching Academy. He was Associate Professor for Coaching and Movement Sciences at the University of Hamburg (1978–80) and then became full professor for Sport Studies and Chair of the Physical Education Department at the University of Göttingen and was head of the Society and Training Section. He has served several times as Dean of the School of Social Sciences in Göttingen.

Krüger was the founding president of the European committee for sports history (1995–97). and has been the President of the Niedersächsisches Institut für Sportgeschichte (Lower Saxony Institute for Sport History). from 2000 to 2018 (Honorary President since 2024). He is the author/editor of more than 40 books and has been published in 15 languages. He has guided 60 PhD and over 300 M.A. theses and was guest professor in Mexico and Japan. In 1985 he founded one of the first sports kindergartens which still exists. The WorldCat has 409 works of/about him. In 1990, Krüger was elected as an International Fellow in the prestigious American Academy of Physical Education (now known as the National Academy of Kinesiology - only the 9th German so honored). In 2012 he received the Human Resources Award for innovative health management of the Deutsche Verband für Gesundheitssport und Sporttherapie and the Fraunhofer-Gesellschaft for their successful Core training programme of forest workers. He was honored by an international Festschrift at the occasion of his 65th birthday (2009) and received the prestigious Bernhard-Zimmermann-Medal for his merits for sport history in 2016. 2023 he was inducted into the Hall of Fame of Sports in Lower Saxony.

== Books ==
- (1972) Die Olympischen Spiele 1936 und die Weltmeinung: ihre außenpolitische Bedeutung unter besonderer Berücksichtigung der USA. Berlin: Bartels & Wernitz, 1972. ISBN 3-87039-925-2
- (1975) Sport und Politik: von Turnvater Jahn zum Staatsamateur. Hannover: Fackelträger. ISBN 3-7716-2087-2
- (1975) Theodor Lewald : Sportführer ins Dritte Reich. Berlin: Bartels & Wernitz. ISBN 3-87039-954-6
- with Oberdieck, Helmut. (1978) Guide to Track & Field Injuries Los Altos, CA: Tafnews. ISBN 0-911520-85-6
- (1979) with Dieter Niedlich: Ursachen der Schulsport-Misere in Deutschland: Festschrift für Professor Konrad Paschen. London: Arena Publ. ISBN 0-902175-37-8
- (1980) Das Berufsbild des Trainers im Sport. International vergleichende Studie und Perspektiven der Traineraus- und - weiterbildung in der Bundesrepublik Deutschland Schorndorf: Hofmann. ISBN 3-7780-7311-7
- (1981) Sport und Gesellschaft Berlin: Tischler. ISBN 3-922654-06-1
- (1984) with John McClelland (eds.). Die Anfänge des modernen Sports in der Renaissance. London : Arena Publ. ISBN 0-902175-45-9
- with Niedlich, Dieter 200 Neue Basketball-Drills 1 edition. Schorndorf: Hofmann, 1982, new editions 1991, 1996, 2001. ISBN 3-7780-9573-0
- with Gebauer, Susanne. (1995) Informationseinrichtungen im Sport. Eine Erhebung in Deutschland, Österreich und der Schweiz Cologne: Sport und Buch Strauss. ISBN 3-89001-185-3
- with Oberdieck, Helmut; Sturm, Manfred. (1986) Ratgeber für Leichtathletikverletzungen Berlin: Tischler. ISBN 3-922654-15-0
- with Niedlich, Dieter. (1985) 100 Ballspiel-Fertigkeitstests Schorndorf: Hofmann. ISBN 3-7780-9811-X
- (1985) (ed.). Leibesübungen in Europa. Die Europäische Gemeinschaft. London: Arena Publ. ISBN 0-902175-42-4
- with Else Trangbæk (eds.): The History of Physical Education and Sport from European Perspectives. Kopenhagen: University of Copenhagen 1999. ISBN 87-89361-69-5
- with Else Trangbæk (1999)(eds.). Gender & sport from European perspectives. Copenhagen : CESH. ISBN 87-89361-67-9
- with Murray, William. (2003)The Nazi Olympics: sport, politics and appeasement in the 1930s Urbana: University of Illinois Press, ISBN 0-252-02815-5
- with Riordan, James (2003). European cultures of sport: examining the nations and regions. Bristol: Intellect. ISBN 1-8415-0014-3
- with Riordan, James (1999). The international politics of sport in the twentieth century. London: Routledge. ISBN 0-419-21160-8
- with Riordan, James (1996). The story of worker sport. Champaign, Ill.: Human Kinetics. ISBN 0-87322-874-X
- with Carter, John M. (1990). Ritual and record: sports records and quantification in pre-modern societies. Westport, Conn: Greenwood. ISBN 0-313-25699-3
- with McClelland, John (1984). Die Anfänge des modernen Sports in der Renaissance. London: Arena Publ. ISBN 978-0-902175-45-7
- with Bernd Wedemeyer-Kolwe (eds.)(2009). Vergessen, verdrängt, abgelehnt: zur Geschichte der Ausgrenzung im Sport. Berlin: Lit. ISBN 978-3-643-10338-3
- With Roland Naul (eds.)(2009). Kulturen des Jugendsports : Bildung, Erziehung und Gesundheit. Aachen: Meyer & Meyer. ISBN 978-3-89899-310-4
- with Susan Bandy, Annette Hofmann (eds.): Gender, Body and Sport in Historical and Transnational Perspectives. Festschrift für Gigliola Gori. Hamburg: Dr. Kovac 2007, ISBN 978-3-8300-3038-6.
- with Angela Teja, Jean François Loudcher, Teresa Gonzalez Aja, Maria Mercedes Palandri (Hrsg.): Corpo e senso del limite. Sport and a sense of the body’s limits. Hannover: Niedersächsisches Inst. für Sportgeschichte 2014. ISBN 978-3-932423-38-3.
- With Swantje Scharenberg (eds.) (2014). Zeiten für Helden – Zeiten für Berühmtheiten im Sport. Münster: LIT. ISBN 978-3-643-12498-2
- Grenzüberschreitung: Sport neu denken. Festschrift zum 65. Geburtstag von Prof. Dr. Arnd Krüger. Swantje Scharenberg, Bernd Wedemeyer-Kolwe, editors. Hoya: Niedersächsisches Inst. für Sportgeschichte, 2009. ISBN 978-3-932423-35-2.
- Arnd Krüger (Ed.): Mind the Gap. The role of suppression, purges, and rejection in sports history and sports historiography. (= Materiales para la historia del deporte 24, 2023), ISSN 2340-7166.
