= Benedict Lust =

German-born American naturopath

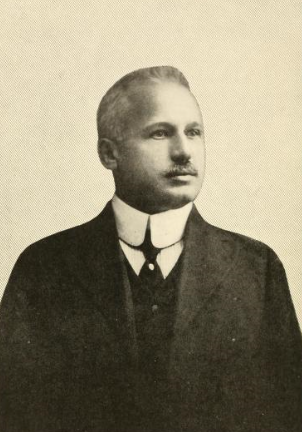
- Lust in 1918
- Born: February 3, 1872; Michelbach, Baden, Germany
- Died: September 5, 1945 (aged 73); Butler, New Jersey, U.S.
- Occupations: Naturopath, writer

Benedict Lust (February 3, 1872 – September 5, 1945) was a German-American who was one of the founders of naturopathy in the first decades of the twentieth century.

== Biography ==
Lust was born in Michelbach, Baden, Germany. As a youth, he became ill and was treated by Fr. Sebastian Kneipp, a famous advocate of the water cure system. In 1892, he moved to the United States as Kneipp's official water cure representative. Lust attended the New York Preparatory College. He graduated from the Universal Osteopathic College in 1897 and the Eclectic and Naturopathic College in 1904. He received an M.D. from the Homeopathic Medical College of New York in 1914.

In 1896, Lust began his career as a naturopath by opening a health center and health food store in New York City. He also opened the New York School of Massage in 1896 and the American School of Chiropractic. He published several German and English language magazines advocating hydrotherapy and natural cure. One of his regular customers at the time was Bernarr Macfadden, the popularizer of physical fitness and natural medicine.

Benedict Lust was a disciple of Adolf Just, a German naturopath. Lust established a branch of Just's Jungborn in the Ramapo Mountains of New Jersey and translated in 1903 Just's book Kehrt zur Natur zurück! into English under the title Return to Nature; the True Natural Method of Living and Healing and the True Salvation of the Soul: Paradise Regained.

In 1901, Lust opened the American School of Naturopathy in Manhattan. He served as the organization's only president. In 1919, the Naturopathic Society of America was dissolved and Lust founded the American Naturopathic Association to supplant it. He operated the Herald of Health and Naturopath journal. He was also associated with Bernarr Macfadden's Physical Culture magazine.

Lust established health resorts known as Yungborn in Butler, New Jersey, and Tangerine, Florida, which acted as the Winter Campus for the American School of Naturopathy until 2001. He published and translated August Engelhardt's book, A Carefree Future in 1913. In 1918, he published the Universal Naturopathic Encyclopedia for drugless therapy, and also published Nature’s Path magazine.

He became known as the "Father of Naturopathy" in America, and his writings and magazines introduced Americans not only to German methods, but also Indian concepts of Ayurveda and Yoga. Paramahansa Yogananda was one of several Indians who wrote articles for Nature’s Path in the 1920s, gaining wide exposure to a large American audience.

Lust was a vegetarianism activist and opponent of the germ theory of disease, vaccination and vivisection. He considered the germ theory to be the "most gigantic hoax of modern times." Lust eschewed the use of drugs and believed that all diseases, including cancer, could be cured by natural processes.

Lust died at Butler, New Jersey.

== Family ==
Lust was the son of Johannes and Luise Lust. He married Aloysia Stroebele (Louisa Stroebele Lust) in New York City on June 11, 1900. Similar to Lust, Stroebele was a naturopath and vegetarian. Lust's brother was Louis Lust, a baker who operated a bakery near Lust's health center. Louis's son John B. Lust, was also a naturopath.

== Controversy ==
Lust was criticized by medical experts for promoting quackery and was often in conflict with the American Medical Association. On one occasion Lust was convicted of practicing medicine without a license and fined $100. He promoted pseudoscientific treatments such as biological blood-washing and zone therapy.

In total, Lust was arrested sixteen times by New York authorities and several times by federal agents. In 1921, Lust was arrested for criminal libel against Frances Benzecry, a private detective for the American Medical Association. Lust wrote that Benzecry was "a disgrace to American womanhood and to the free soil of America on which she treads". He was released after a $10,000 bond was posted.

== Selected publications ==
- Universal Naturopathic Encyclopedia (1918)
- The Fountain of Youth: Or Curing by Water (1923)
- The Crime of Vaccination (1926)
- Zone Therapy Or Relieving Pain and Sickness by Nerve Pressure (1928)

== See also ==
- Lebensreform
