= Dangerous Love =

Dangerous Love may refer to:

- "Dangerous Love" (song), a song by Fuse ODG featuring Sean Paul
- Dangerous Love (novel), a novel by Ben Okri
- Dangerous Love (1920 film), a silent Western
- Dangerous Love (1988 film), a film starring Elliott Gould
- "Dangerous Love", a song by T-ara from "Bunny Style!"
- "Dangerous Love", a song by Little from Kick the Can Crew
- "Dangerous Love", a song by Racer X from Extreme Volume Live
- "Dangerous Love", a TV episode of Sweet Valley High
- "A Dangerous Love", a TV episode of Saints & Sinners
- ADL, a double album by Yeat

== See also ==
- Dangerous Lover, Hindi title for the 2009 Indian Tamil-language film Vaamanan
