= The Freedom Artist =

2019 novel by Ben Okri

The Freedom artist
- First edition (UK)
- Author: Ben Okri
- Language: English
- Genre: Dystopian, Political fiction
- Publisher: Akashic Books (US); Head of Zeus (UK)
- Publication date: 2019
- Publication place: Nigeria
- Pages: 336
- ISBN: 978-1-61775-791-4
- Preceded by: The Age of Magic

The Freedom Artist is a dystopian political novel by Nigerian novelist and poet Ben Okri. The first edition was published in 2019 by Akashic Books in the US and by Head of Zeus in the UK.
