= The Famished Road =

1991 novel by Ben Okri

- First-edition cover
- Author: Ben Okri
- Language: English
- Genre: Magic realism
- Set in: Nigeria, 1950s–60s^{note}
- Publisher: Jonathan Cape
- Publication date: 14 March 1991
- Publication place: United Kingdom
- Media type: Print: hardback
- Pages: 500
- ISBN: 9780224027014
- OCLC: 935491907
- Dewey Decimal: 823.914
- LC Class: PR9387.9 .O394
- Followed by: Songs of Enchantment

The Famished Road is a novel by Nigerian author Ben Okri, the first book in a trilogy that continues with Songs of Enchantment (1993) and Infinite Riches (1998). Published in London in 1991 by Jonathan Cape, The Famished Road follows Azaro, an abiku, or spirit child, living in an unnamed African (most likely Nigerian) city. The novel employs a unique narrative style, incorporating the spirit world with the "real" world in what some have classified as animist realism. Others have labelled the book African traditional religion realism, while still others choose simply to call the novel fantasy literature. The book exploits the belief in the coexistence of the spiritual and material worlds that is a defining aspect of traditional African life.

The Famished Road was awarded the Booker Prize for Fiction for 1991, making Okri the youngest ever winner of the prize at the age of 32.

== Background ==
Okri has spoken of writing the novel during the time from 1988, when he lived in a Notting Hill flat that he rented from publisher friend Margaret Busby: "I brought the first draft of The Famished Road with me and that flat was where I began rewriting it.... Something about my writing changed round about that time. I acquired a kind of tranquillity. I had been striving for something in my tone of voice as a writer—it was there that it finally came together.... That flat is also where I wrote the short stories that became Stars of the New Curfew."

In the introduction to the 25th-anniversary edition of The Famished Road, Okri said: "The novel was written to give myself reasons to live. Often the wonder of living fades from us, obscured by a thousand things. I wanted to look at life afresh and anew and I sought a story that would give me the right vantage point. It is also meant to be a humorous book–from the perspective of the spirits, the deeds and furies of men are tinged with absurdity. Poverty compelled me to break off writing the novel in order to shape another, different book which would help keep me alive. This was a book of short stories and it forced compression on me."

== Plot synopsis ==
Azaro is an abiku, or spirit-child, from the ghetto of an unknown city in Africa. He is constantly harassed by his sibling spirits from another world who want him to leave this mortal life and return to the world of spirits, sending many emissaries to bring him back. Azaro has stubbornly refused to leave this life, owing to his love for his mother and father. He is the witness of many happenings in the mortal realm. His father works as a labourer while his mother sells items as a hawker. Madame Koto, the owner of a local bar, asks Azaro to visit her establishment, convinced that he will bring good luck and customers to her bar. Meanwhile, his father prepares to be a boxer after convincing himself and his family that he has a talent to be a pugilist. Two opposing political parties try to bribe or coerce the residents to vote for them.

== Characters ==
- Azaro is the story's narrator. He is an abiku, or spirit child, who has never lost ties with the spirit world. He is named after Lazarus, of the New Testament. The story follows him as he tries to live his life, always aware of the spirits trying to bring him back.
- Azaro's father is an idealistic load-carrier who wants the best for his family and the community. He suffers greatly for his idealism and altruism throughout the novel, boxing on occasion under his previous title, Black Tyger, and later develops aspirations of becoming a politician. Azaro's father is frequently both physically and emotionally abusive towards his son. Bitter at having an abiku; Azaro's father drinks exceedingly and occasionally becomes physically violent with other members of his community.
- Azaro's mother works very hard for the family, selling anything she can get her hands on. She cares for her family deeply and constantly gives up food and security for them and their ideals. She is proud that Azaro is her son and goes to great lengths to protect him.
- Madame Koto is proprietress of a local bar. She has a liking for Azaro, though at times is convinced he brings bad luck. She starts out as a well-meaning woman, trying to get along with everyone else. However, as the story progresses, she becomes richer, siding with the political Party of the Rich, and is often accused of witchcraft. She tries to help Azaro and his family on numerous occasions but seems to try to take Azaro's blood to remain youthful.
- Jeremiah the Photographer is a young artist who brings the village to the rest of the world and the rest of the world to the village. He manages to get some of his photographs published but practices his craft at great personal risk.
- The Landlord supports the Party of the Rich and is angry with Azaro's family for causing troubles to him and his compound.
- Ade is a fellow abiku, the son of a Herbalist and Azaro's only friend.

== Reception and legacy ==
In a review of The Famished Road for The New York Times, Henry Louis Gates Jr. wrote: "It is the redoubtable accomplishment of this book (which won Britain's Booker Prize in 1991) to have forged a narrative that is both engagingly lyrical and intriguingly post-modern. And Mr. Okri has done so not merely, as we might expect, by adapting techniques of the magic realism associated with the great Latin American novelists (especially Gabriel García Márquez), but by returning to the themes and structures of traditional Yoruba mythology and the relatively little-known achievements of the Yoruba novel. ... Ben Okri, by plumbing the depths of Yoruba mythology, has created a political fable about the crisis of democracy in Africa and throughout the modern world. More than that, however, he has ushered the African novel into its own post-modern era through a compelling extension of traditional oral forms that uncover the future in the past. But while The Famished Road may signal a new achievement for the African novel in English, it would be a dazzling achievement for any writer in any language."

The novel was the inspiration behind the lyrics to Radiohead's song "Street Spirit (Fade Out)" on their album The Bends (1995).

== Notes ==
1.The country is not named in the book, but references to Guinness, eba, the harmattan, garri, highlife music, ogogoro, egungun, obeche, the pound as currency, bukka, dogonyaro, peppersoup, agbadas and kaoline make the Nigerian setting clear.
