= Every Leaf a Hallelujah =

2021 novel by Ben Okri

- Author: Ben Okri
- Illustrator: Diana Ejaita
- Cover artist: Diana Ejaita
- Language: English
- Subject: Environmentalism
- Genre: Children's literature; Magic realism; Climate fiction
- Publisher: Other Press (US); Apollo (UK)
- Publication date: 2021
- Publication place: United Kingdom
- Media type: Print (Hardcover); Digital
- Pages: 112
- ISBN: 978-1800241626 (Apollo edition)

Every Leaf a Hallelujah is an environment theme novel written by Nigerian-British writer Ben Okri and illustrated by Diana Ejaita. It was published in 2021 by Other Press (US) and Apollo (UK) in 2021.

== Background and inspiration ==
Every Leaf a Hallelujah is Okri's eight novel and first children's literature novel. Okri's love for nature influenced him to write the novel. The book is a form of protest against deforestation made by certain "grown-ups" who "value money over nature."

== Characters ==
- Mangoshi — a little child who stands up for nature
- Manager — a timber and construction company owner

== Plot ==
The story follow Mangoshi, a child with a dying mother who ventures into the forest to get a precious leaf that can heal her mother. She finds out that the nature is dying too. She heads back to the village empty-handed but is forced to return again when everyone in the village falls sick.

In her second journey, she is being guided by an old baobab tree that teaches her about the predicament of trees and nature at large. Mangoshi is tasked to standing up against companies bent of "leveling the forest".

== Theme and style ==
Themes in the book includes deforestation, eco-activism. Okri employed the use of poetry and folklore.

== Reception ==
Publishers Weekly described it as a "gem" that "will resonate with both adult fantasy readers and their children." It was listed in Brittle Paper's Notable Books of 2021. Miles Ellingham of Financial Times described it as "part magical realism, part dendrological encyclopedia and part manual for non-violent resistance." praising Okri's "clear prose form," noting that "his sentences have a careful simplicity, but not at the expense of eloquent writing." He further stated that the story was "more enchanting by Diana Ejaita’s illustrations."

Karen Haber writing for Locus called it "a journey into bold color and imagery filled with constant rewards." noting that Ejiata uses "graphic motifs that call back to African textiles, collage, and woodcut prints."
