= Adolf Just =

German naturopath (1859–1936)

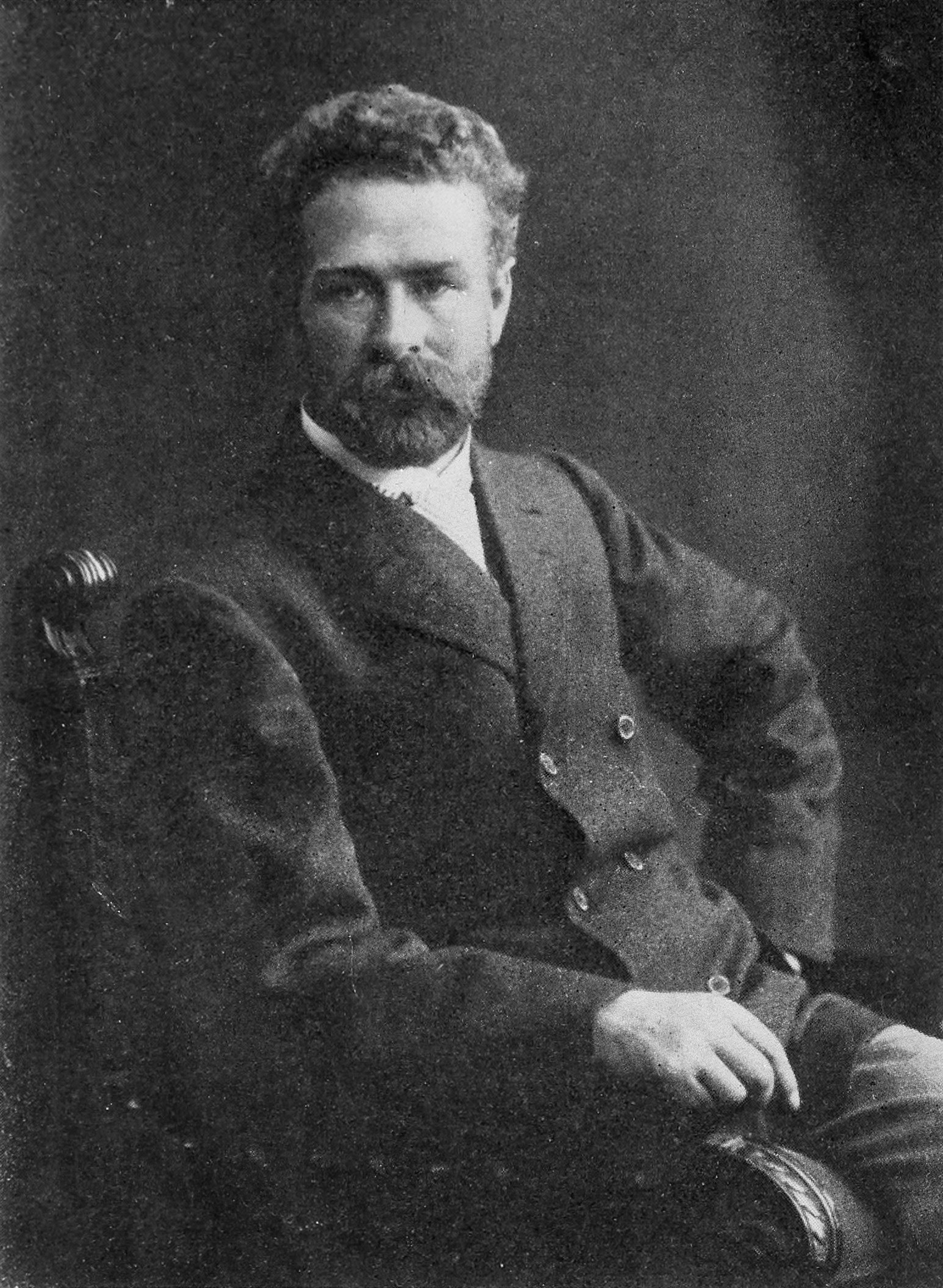
- Born: 8 August 1859; Lüthorst
- Died: 20 January 1936 (aged 76); Blankenburg (Harz)
- Occupations: Naturopath, writer

Adolf Just (born 8 August 1859, Lüthorst near Dassel, Kingdom of Hanover; died 20 January 1936, Blankenburg (Harz) was a German naturopath. He was the founder of the sanatorium Jungborn in Eckertal (resin).

== Life ==
He began an apprenticeship as a bookseller, but fell ill and turned in the self-study on various natural remedies, through which he became a lay practitioner. For a philosophy of medicine he most strongly advocated a "Return to Nature", utilizing natural food, clean water, fresh air, earthen clay, as well as time spent in nature itself. Eckertal in 1895 he founded the Naturopathic Institute Jungborn. The most prominent patient was Franz Kafka. In 1918 Just founded the healing clay Society in Blankenburg (Harz), and started the company, Luvos. His main work attracted interest in India and led there to set up a still existing natural medicine hospital in Pune.

Just held a Christianized religious ideology based on the idea that salvation could be regained by understanding how primordial man used to live. He held the belief that in the beginning, "all creatures, frog and mouse, hedgehog and hare, deer, and elk, fox and badger" all lived in harmony with the Creator. Animals remained in their pristine state of grace, whilst man fell. He believed that by studying the behaviour of animals, people could experience salvation of the soul. Just believed that Jesus came to redeem humanity by teaching how to live in harmony with nature.

His best known work Kehrt zur Natur zurück! (Back to Nature!), was translated by Benedict Lust in 1903. Just opposed everything that was not in accordance with nature. He opposed automobiles, modern housing and chemical agriculture. He rejected medical science and criticized vaccination and vivisection. He believed that vaccines were poisons that inflict misery upon people. Just advocated morning fasts and a raw food vegetarian diet of unprocessed foods. He considered a diet of fruit and nuts to be the best natural foods for man. He rejected the use of any drugs but was also critical of homeopathy and gymnastics which he considered artificial. He commented that "to the physical culturists, therefore, I would say 'Return to Nature!' Come forth from your musty, dusty rooms and halls, out into free nature."

Science writer Martin Gardner has noted that "Just's Return to Nature recommended sleeping on bare ground, walking barefooted on wet lawns and sand, and using clay compresses."

== Publications ==
- Return to Nature! (translated into English in 1903 by Benedict Lust)
- Jungborn echo. Brief History of Jungborn especially interesting judgments, reports, articles and important Kurberichte (1904)
- The Jungborn - table. A new, simple, vegetarian cookbook, 1905
- The Help on the way! Mental and emotional life (1907)
- The battle for the truth. The contemporary nature of life (earth and clay) court (1907)
- The contemporary nature of healing, in a condensed form. Human salvation for body, mind and soul (1913)
- The healing earth, nature and the old folk remedy and its wonderful healing of internal and external application. All true modern natural healing method on a Christian foundation (1919)
- The Earth as a remedy. The old natural and folk remedies, and its wonderful healing of internal and external application. The true nature of healing, contemporary Christian basis (1921)

== See also ==
- Lebensreform
- Luvos, a German manufacturer of medicinal clay-based products for both internal and external application, established by alternative medicine practitioner Adolf Just in Blankenburg in 1918.
