= Medical product =

Medical product could refer to:

- Medications
  - Medicinal clay
  - Medicinal fungi
  - Medicinal plants
    - Medicinal cannabis
- Medical devices

== See also ==
- Medicine
