= Astonishing the Gods =

1995 novel by Ben Okri

- First edition (publ. Phoenix House)
- Author: Ben Okri
- Publisher: Phoenix House
- Publication date: March 16, 1995
- ISBN: 978-1-897-58097-4

Astonishing the Gods is a novel by Nigerian writer Ben Okri.

On 5 November 2019 BBC News listed Astonishing the Gods on its list of the 100 most influential novels.

In an interview with The Guardian Okri mentioned that he wrote the novel while on a fast.
