= Flowers and Shadows =

1989 novel by Ben Okri

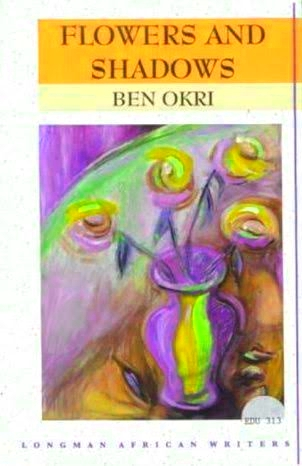
- Author: Ben Okri
- Language: English
- Genre: fiction
- Publisher: Longman
- Publication date: January 1, 1989
- Publication place: Nigeria
- ISBN: 0-582-03536-8

Flowers and Shadows is a 1989 novel by Ben Okri. The novel portrays the realities of poverty and social lifestyle in Lagos. The protagonist, Jeffia, initially sheltered in wealth, confronts the darker aspects of his family's history and society's injustices. Themes of innocence versus experience, the legacy of family sins, and the resilience of hope amidst despair frequently appear throughout the novel. Through rich language and diverse characters, the novel explores the concept of beauty and brutality, ultimately offering a message of triumphant optimism despite society's shadows.

== Plot summary ==
Flowers and Shadows focuses on the journey of Jeffia, a privileged young man in Lagos, Nigeria. who confronts the realities of his family's past and the societal injustices surrounding him. Despite his pampered upbringing, Jeffia becomes increasingly aware of the violence and poverty plaguing the city's poorer quarters.

As Jeffia looks into his family's history, he uncovers dark secrets and the legacy of his father's ruthless pursuit of power and wealth. The novel explores themes of innocence versus experience, as Jeffia grapples with the revelation of his father's violent nature and the impact it has had on his own life. Amidst the despair, Jeffia finds hope in Cynthia, a young woman whose resilience and love serve as a beacon of light in the darkness. Despite the odds stacked against them, their love story unfolds against the backdrop of Lagos's squalor and societal evils.

Throughout the narrative, the contrast between beauty and brutality (or "Flowers and Shadows") is explored. Despite the challenges they face, Jeffia and Cynthia maintain their resilience and optimism.

== Language choice ==
The novel exhibits blends standard English and Nigerian pidgin; Jeffia's privileged upbringing is reflected in his speech, while the marginalized use pidgin. This contrast emphasizes class and cultural differences between the characters.

== Setting ==
The novel unfolds against the backdrop of Lagos, Nigeria, a sprawling metropolis of deep economic inequity. In the affluent quarters where Jeffia resides, lavish mansions, gated communities, and upscale shopping districts abound. The wealthy navigate a world of luxury and excess, insulated from the harsh realities faced by the majority.

At other times, the novel explores the poorer sections of Lagos, including its crowded streets, dilapidated buildings, and open sewers. In these neighborhoods, residents struggle to eke out a living amidst the chaos and uncertainty of daily life.

The novel uses evocative imagery to capture the sensory experience of Lagos, from the bustling markets and chaotic traffic jams to the vibrant street life and bustling waterfront. The setting serves as a dynamic and integral part of the narrative, shaping the characters' experiences and influencing the course of their lives.
