= Infinite Riches =

1998 novel by Ben Okri

- Author: Ben Okri
- Language: English
- Publication date: 1998
- Publication place: Nigeria
- Preceded by: Songs of Enchantment

Infinite Riches is a novel by Nigerian writer Ben Okri, published in 1998. The spirit-child Azaro remains in the chaotic world of his African village, seeing the turbulent and fragile lives of the Living. These include his mother, who fights for justice, and his father, who is imprisoned for a crime he did not commit. The book is the third book of a trilogy which began with Famished Road in 1991.

== Plot synopsis ==
Infinite Riches begins where Songs of Enchantment ends, with Azaro's father being incarcerated for the suspected murder of a neighbor. Azaro is a child of spirit. He promised his spirit friends that he would die as soon as possible and return to them after he was born. However, Azaro breached his promise when he was born. So far, his spirit mates have dispatched five spirits, but they haven't succeeded in getting him back. The two most dangerous are dispatched in addition.
