= Diosmectite =

Silicate of aluminium and magnesium

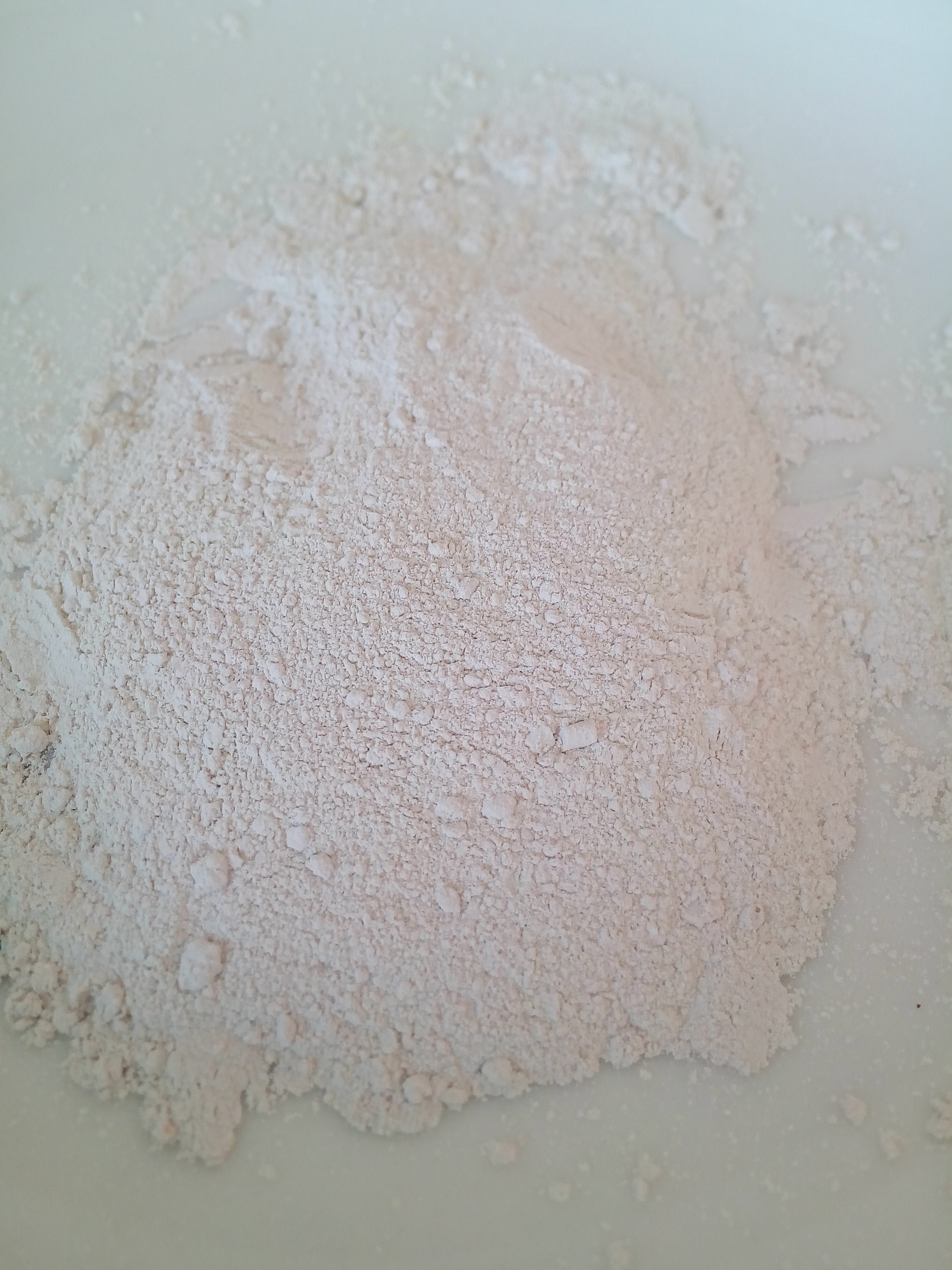
- Diosmectite powder

Clinical data
- AHFS/Drugs.com: International Drug Names
- ATC code: A07BC05 (WHO)

Identifiers
- CAS Number: 1318-93-0
- UNII: A585MN1H2L

Chemical and physical data
- Formula: (Na-Ca)0.33-(Al-Mg)2-Si4-O10-(O-H)2·(H2O)2

Diosmectite (brand names Smecta, Smecdral) is a natural silicate of aluminium and magnesium used as an intestinal adsorbent in the treatment of several gastrointestinal diseases, including infectious and non-infectious acute and chronic diarrhoea, including irritable bowel syndrome diarrhea subtype. Other uses include: radiation-induced, chemotherapy-induced, and HIV/AIDS-associated chronic diarrhea.

It is insoluble in water. It is usually taken orally as a suspension in warm water. In the field of geology, it is more commonly known as montmorillonite. Diosmectite is a contraction of "dioctahedral smectite".

== Mechanism of action ==
Its effectiveness in improving stool consistency is believed to result from its ability to absorb bacteria, viruses and toxins, as well as strengthen the intestinal mucus barrier to reduce luminal antigens passing through the mucus barrier, although the precise mechanism of action has not been fully established.

Diosmectite may be a useful additive in the treatment of acute childhood diarrhoea. As evidence is of ‘low quality’, future research is needed with higher quality designs before any firm recommendations can be made.

== See also ==
- Geophagy
- Medicinal clay
