= The Age of Magic =

2014 novel by Ben Okri

- First edition
- Author: Ben Okri
- Language: English
- Genre: magic realism
- Publisher: Head of Zeus
- Publication date: 1 January 2014
- Publication place: Nigeria
- Media type: Print (hardback)
- Pages: 287
- ISBN: 9781784081478
- Preceded by: Starbook
- Followed by: The Freedom Artist

The Age of Magic is a 2014 novel by Nigerian writer Ben Okri. It won the Bad Sex in Fiction Award in 2014.
