= Songs of Enchantment =

1993 novel by Ben Okri

Songs of Enchanment
- Author: Ben Okri
- Language: English
- Series: The Famished Road Trilogy
- Genre: Magic Realism
- Set in: Nigeria, 1960s
- Publisher: Doubleday
- Publication date: April 27, 1993
- Publication place: Nigeria
- Media type: Print (hardback)
- Pages: 304
- ISBN: 0-385-47154-8
- OCLC: 935491907
- Preceded by: The Famished Road
- Followed by: Infinite Riches

Songs of Enchantment is a novel by Nigerian author Ben Okri, the second book in a trilogy that started with The Famished Road (1991) and continues with Infinite Riches (1998). It was published in London in 1993 by Doubleday.
