= The Landscapes Within =

1981 novel by Ben Okri

- Author: Ben Okri
- Language: English
- Genre: Fiction, political fiction, psychology
- Publisher: Longman
- Publication date: January 1, 1981
- Publication place: Nigeria
- ISBN: 9780582785397

The Landscapes Within is a 1981 book by Nigerian writer Ben Okri and was published by Longman. The novel is set in Lagos, Nigeria.
