= Lemnian Earth =

Historic medicinal clay

Lemnian Earth was a medicinal clay sourced from the Greek island of Lemnos in the Aegean Sea. It was used from antiquity on until the post-medieval period for the treatment of poisonings, open wounds and other illnesses. Lemnian clay was shaped into tablets with distinctive seals stamped into them, from which it got its name terra sigillata - Latin for 'sealed earth'.

== History ==
Lemnian Earth was first documented in the 3rd century BCE for its use as a pigment. The earliest mention of its application as a medicine appears in Dioscorides' De Materia Medica, dated to ca. 50–70. Dioscorides describes how the earth is dug out of a cave, mixed with goat's blood and sealed with a goat seal, which shows the connection between the seal on the tablets and its medical use from the very beginning. He recommends Lemnian Earth as a treatment for open wounds, bites from venomous animals and suggest ingestion as an antidote to poisoning. Galen's De Simplicium Medicamentorum, dated to ca. 100-160, is an important source for the earth's extraction in antiquity as the author visited Lemnos and is able to give a detailed accounts as a first-hand witness. Other important sources from antiquity include Philostratus in Heroicus (ca. 170-240) and Pliny's Historia Naturalis (77-79) where he says:

if rubbed under the eyes, it moderates pain and watering from the same, and prevents the flow from the lachrymal ducts. In cases of haemorrhage it should be administered with vinegar. It is used against complaints of the spleen and kidneys, copious menstruation, also against poisons, and wounds caused by serpents.

References to Lemnian Earth in natural history texts are common until the 2nd century, after which they become increasingly rare, which potentially indicates a decline in its use. Lemnian Earth experiences a revival during the 14th century within the Ottoman Empire, when it became a widely traded medicine across Europe. From the 15th to 19th century, Lemnian Earth is mentioned throughout travel accounts. The French naturalist Pierre Belon took special interest in Lemnian Earth and after encountering it in Constantinople, he visted Lemnos in 1546 and describes the site and process of extraction in detail, although he did not witness it himself.

The raw material for Lemnian Earth was extracted from a site near Kotsinas, close to a spring known as Phthelidia. In antiquity, extraction of the raw clay was done by a priestess of Artemis, after which the material was transported to the nearby city of Hephaestia for further treatment. This included extensive washing of the clay, and the ritual sacrifice of grains to the Earth. In the medieval period, contemporary sources describe the extraction as taking place annually on August 6, from a designated pit near a stream.

== Scientific Analysis ==
Modern research shows that Lemnian Earth is primarily composed of montmorillonite, kaolin, alum, and hematite. Some Lemnian Earth sphragides have been found to have antibacterial properties and ingestion may have positive effects on the gut microbiome, which could explain its historic therapeutic use.

Some researchers argue that water used for washing the natural clay in both the ancient and medieval process may have altered the composition of the clay. The spring water near the extraction site is naturally enriched with alum, which could have concentrated in the clay during washing and may have contributed to its medicinal properties. Additionally, the technique of levigation, where clay is mixed with water, heavier particles are allowed to settle, and lighter impurities are separated, may have helped to purify the clay and produce a finer, more uniform material. Therefore, the final medicinal product was produced from the raw clay through ritual processing, which might have significantly altered its composition and properties.

== See also ==
- Medicinal clay
