= In Arcadia =

2002 novel by Ben Okri

- First edition
- Author: Ben Okri
- Language: English
- Genre: Fiction
- Published: 2002; 24 years ago
- Publisher: Weidenfeld & Nicolson
- Publication place: United Kingdom
- Media type: Print
- Pages: 231

In Arcadia is a 2002 novel by Ben Okri. It is a book inspired by Nicolas Poussin's 17th-century painting Et in Arcadia ego, and sweeps through 400 years of history, set in Europe, primarily London and Paris.
