= Frances Benzecry =

Early female detective

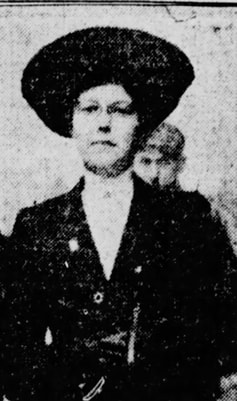
Detective Frances McKeon Benzecry

Frances McKeon Benzecry (c.1878 – 1937) was one of the first female detectives in New York City.

== Life ==
Frances McKeon-Benzecry was the daughter of Bernard McKeon and Agnes Harmon. She married her husband, Benjamin Benzecry, on July 5, 1901, in Manhattan, New York. Benjamin and Frances had two children, Lucille and Etoile. Frances died in 1937, aged 59, shortly after becoming a widow. Her residence six years prior to her death was in Los Angeles, California.

== Education ==
Frances Benzecry graduated from New York Normal College, which is known today as Hunter College.

== Career ==
Frances Benzecry served as an investigator for the New York County Medical Society for ten years. Beginning her detective career in 1905, Benzecry patrolled New York City looking for medical malpractices and abortion-performing midwives. Her detective work often placed her in bizarre situations, namely dealing with psychics, naturopaths, and faith healers. In using her feminine attributes, Benzecry was able to pursue her detective work to an extent that was unachievable by a male detective, especially in investigating abortion procedures and midwives. Frances often posed as having a ludicrous ailment or symptom, for which she would seek help from a medical practitioner or healer who was unlicensed to practice. In a sting-like operation, Benzecry would expose the malpractice and be able to prosecute the offender.

Benzecry released a detailed chronicle regarding some of her detective work in The Ladies' Home Journal in an article titled "What I Have Found Out as a Medical Detective". In the exposé-style article, she revealed several of the unusual medical treatments and healings she received. In one instance, she was advised to wear only light blue and, if she were to appear in public, carry the brightest red carnations she could find, in an attempt to cure issues within her nervous system.

Once no longer working for the New York County Medical Society, Benzecry began private investigation work.
