= Luvos =

Medicinal products manufacturer

Heilerde-Gesellschaft Luvos Just GmbH & Co. KG
- Company type: Private
- Industry: Naturopathic medicine and cosmetics
- Founded: 1918
- Founder: Adolf Just (1859–1936)
- Headquarters: Friedrichsdorf, Hesse, Germany
- Key people: Ariane Kaestner
- Products: Medicinal clay-based medicine and cosmetics
- Revenue: ▲€ 4 million (2005)
- Number of employees: 15
- Website: luvos.de

Heilerde-Gesellschaft Luvos Just GmbH & Co. KG is a German manufacturer of medicinal clay (Heilerde, "healing-earth")-based products for both internal and external application. Four different fineness grades of loess in both capsule and powder form are available from the company, as well as cosmetics products. The Luvos purified loess consists mainly of montmorillonite.

== History ==
Luvos was established by alternative medicine practitioner Adolf Just in Blankenburg in 1918. Previously, Just had founded the Jungborn in 1895, a center for alternative healing, where he had extolled and popularized the healing properties of certain clays. The Jungborn was situated between Eckertal and Stapelburg in the Harz, an area which later became part of East Germany. Therefore, the Luvos company was relocated to Friedrichsdorf in the Taunus.

The company is still family-owned today and run by Just's great-granddaughter Ariane Kaestner.

In 2017 the company was fined €40,000 for fraudulent advertisements.

== Products ==
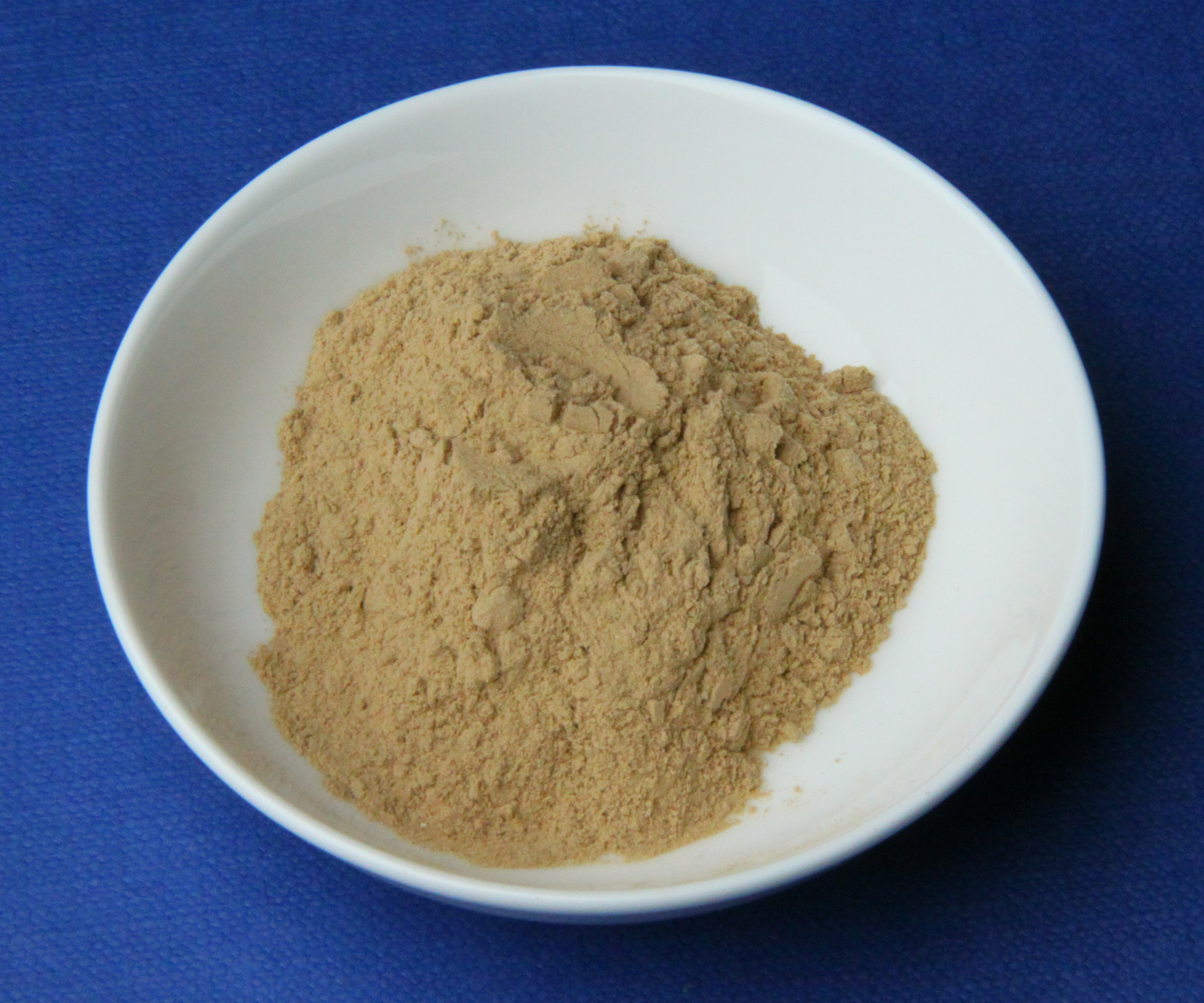
Luvos medicinal clay (actually loess), fineness grade 1

During production, Luvos Heilerde is first dried, then sterilized at 130 °C (266 °F), and subsequently milled to achieve different fineness grades. The three coarsest grades of Luvos—"1" (fine), "2" (coarse; external use), and "ultra-fine" (for children and those having weakened constitutions)—have been in production since the time of Just. In August 2010, an even finer grade, "micro-fine", was introduced, which is supposed to bind excess cholesterol and bile acids.

In 2004, 90% of company revenue came from Germany, the rest was made with exports, primarily to Austria, Switzerland, Italy, Scandinavia, and America.

== See also ==
- Lebensreform
