= Dangerous Love (novel) =

Novel by Ben Okri

- First edition cover
- Author: Ben Okri
- Language: English
- Publisher: Phoenix House
- Publication date: 8 April 1996
- Publication place: United Kingdom
- Media type: Hardback
- Pages: 416
- ISBN: 1897580592

Dangerous Love is a 1996 novel by Nigeria-born British author Ben Okri set in Lagos of the 1970s. It is a remake of an earlier book, The Landscapes Within (1981). It is set in a post civil-war Nigerian society in a Lagos compound. Dangerous Love follows a young artist named Omovo and the influence that corrupt politics has on his artistry in the ghettos of Lagos in Nigeria after the Civil War.

The book is more conventional and realist than Okri's previous works, it also does not have as many literary critiques due to its experimental nature.

Dangerous Love is considered a Künstlerroman, or a coming of age story following an artist and is noted to be an unfinished Künstlerroman due to the unfinished artistic development of the character Omovo in the novel.

The Landscapes Within and Dangerous Love are continuations of the work of the Nigerian authors Amos Tutuola and the Ghanaian author Ayi Kwei Armah in the exploration of the meaning of beauty.

== Plot ==
=== Book One ===
Dangerous Love starts with the main character Omovo whose disappointing new haircut leads him to shave his entire head. He has a supernatural vision and goes home to paint a tree with clouds surrounding it that are shaped like corpses. He feels detached from his home and life and he goes for a walk.

On this walk, Omovo sees Ifeyiwa, a woman in the compound that is married to Takpo. Omovo walks to Dr. Okocha who is a fellow painter and friend of Omovo's, they talk about painting and an upcoming gallery. Omovo receives a note from Ifeyiwa to meet the next day.

The next day, Omovo and Ifeyiwa walk together and talk about her dream, his hair, and drawing. She tells him that she hates her life, the two of them kiss and she skips away.

Omovo's painting was stolen from his house and he ends up seeing it later on as the cover of a book, "written by an Englishman on the African condition." He sees his father and his step mother, Blackie, make love and it reminds him of when he was a while and he saw his parents do the same. He doesn't sleep that night and instead paints a piece called "Drift" that is of a scum pool that he walks by often by his compound. This painting was invited to the showcase happening that Dr. Okocha mentioned a few days earlier.

In this chapter, Omovo goes to the gallery that is hosting the showcase and he finds the manager to be peculiar. The showcase starts and Omovo is overwhelmed and breaks down often as people speak to him. The difference between his reality and his imagination is blurred. Government officials take Omovo into a separate room and interrogate him on the meaning of his painting. The officials take the painting because they believe it mocks the progress that Nigeria has made and Omovo is perceived as a rebel. Omovo grows to hate the painting.

Omovo and his friend Keme leave the gallery to go to a hotel, Keme has a bad encounter with a former classmate. They go to the local park and talk and meditate for a few hours. Darkness falls and they become lost in the park. Eventually, they stumble into a ten-year-old girl who was ritually sacrificed and both Omovo and Keme are startled. They find their way to their friend Dele's place and they anonymously call the police.

After the night in the park, Omovo goes home to find his father is angry. Omovo journals about his day and falls asleep to have a nightmare.

=== Extract from a notebook ===
A paragraph between Book 1 and Book 2 describes from first-person view a dark forest and walking towards a light at the end of the forest as the dead girl from Chapter 6 follows without a nose or a mouth.

=== Book Two ===
The experience with the ritually sacrificed girl reminds Omovo of an experience in his childhood in Ughelli during the civil war. He had gotten lost and stood under a tree. A group of people came chanting about killing the Igbo people, and they beat a man to death, stole a young girl and destroyed a building with people inside. The girl is later pronounced dead. A letter from Omovo's brothers, Okur and Umeh, comes in containing a poem and news that they are working on a ship. Omovo then fights with his step-mother, Blackie, and he is expelled from the house.

Omovo reflects on the story of how Okur and Umeh fought with their father and moved out to explore. They rebelled and wanted to go to University but their father wouldn't pay for it because he wanted them to have an apprenticeship instead.

Children of the compound surround Omovo and he gives them money, he talks with Ifeyiwa briefly to set up a meeting and she expresses concern for his well-being. Omovo goes back to his room and reflects on his start as an artist. He draws a few pieces called "Lifelines'' and he is not happy with them.

Chapter 4 focuses on Ifeyiwa, her father accidentally killed a girl and started a conflict with local groups. Her father and brother killed themselves. Her relationship with Tapko is abusive, earlier she started taking night classes and her husband became jealous and he forbade her from going. She takes to sleeping on the floor..

There is conflict between the local villages. A village member, Tuwo, comes to talk with Tapko and warns him about Omovo and Ifeyiwa. Tapko physically abuses Ifeyiwa in front of Tuwo. Tapko says that he must see the affair with his own eyes before he believes it.

Omovo finds that his father is acting strangely. He talks with Dr. Okocha and tells him of his experience he had as a kid with the killing of the Igobo man. They talk about what it means to be an artist and what truth means. Dr. Okocha has to leave for two weeks and they say goodbye.

On his walk to his friend Okoro's house, Omovo runs into a woman that falls into some mud and ruins her dress and heels. Okoro introduces Omovo to his girlfriend and Dele comes over and talks about an issue he has with a woman he got pregnant. He is considering leaving for America because she won't have an abortion, however, his father will disown him. Omovo leaves and waits for Ifeyiwa at home.

Outside of Omovos house the elder men of the compound are drinking and talking about sex. One mentions a doctor that created a medicine that makes a man and a woman stick together if they are committing adultery. Omovo is listening and becomes increasingly uncomfortable, he then leaves to meet Ifeyiwa.

Omovo and Ifeyiwa sneak away to go to a hotel and they walk through the Amukoko ghetto. Omovo is amazed at the depth of poverty and Ifeyiwa is hit on by men and Omovo is made fun of by local prostitutes due to his shaved head. They walk through Lagos and find a beach, they then find an outdoor party and Ifeyiwa dances and attracts the attention of the men. A man at the party reminds Omovo of Tuwo and they leave and find a tree. They kiss passionately and she gives hima ring that her mother gave her as good luck. They walk back towards their home and it begins to pour, Ifeyiwa says that her husband was out that night so she won't be in trouble. Ifeyiwa goes home and Omovo stands in the dark and thinks until there is a power outage.

Ifeyiwa's husband was home and waiting for her, but she said she was visiting her friend Mary. He lashes out and beats her, to escape she runs outside and he locks her out. She sleeps outside for an hour before he comes and begs her to come sleep inside, but she refuses. She sleeps on the cement in the rain instead.

The night before, after spending time with Ifeyiwa, Omovo wrote on the wall "Yesterday is but a dream... and tomorrow is only a vision... but today well lived makes every yesterday a dream of happiness... and tomorrow a vision of hope. Look well, therefore, to this day." In her backyard, Omovo draws Ifeyiwa for hours and has a hard time concentrating on all her features. He paints intensely, so much so that he doesn't realize when Tupko comes and tears her away and destroys his drawings.

Keme wakes Omovo up and is upset about how nothing is being done about the killing of the young girl. Keme longs for travel and is trying to go to the US. Keme leaves and Omovo starts painting and begins to chant as he paints a piece that portrays his perspective of the African reality of Nigeria, he is happy with the painting. He visits Dr. Okocha but he wasn't home.

One of Omovo's maternal relatives visits but picks a fight with Blackie and Omovo's father ends up escalating the conflict to the point of getting his machete out. After the relatives leave his house, Omovo searches for them and meet his Uncle. The Uncle talks about the disappointing state of Omovo's family and Omovo becomes frustrated and disturbed by the words, they give him a gift and Omovo wonders until it is dark. Omovo sleeps and has a nightmare about his mother.

=== Book Three ===
Omovo showers and Ifeyiwa finds him in the compound's bathroom to establish a meeting that day, she tells him that she is okay. He goes to work and fights for a seat on the bus but is ejected at a different stop and he sees Okoro and catches up with him. Okoro was partying the night before. Both Omovo and Okoro mention that they are sad that they are westernized after Omovo remarks that he doesn't know traditional dance. Omovo then reenters the bus to go to work.

At work, Omovo is ridiculed for tardiness. The manager yells at Omovo. Omovo has a customer from a big business who tries to bribe Omovo. Omovo does not accept the bribe.

Joe, from the accounting department at work, tells Omovo to take the bribes because that's how business works. Omovo is sent to the manager's office and is lectured about helping customers. During break Omovo meditates and begins to have clear visions of what he should paint next. The manager's nephew comes in and is asking for a job.

Omovo goes home and takes a nap, and his father wakes him up and has been drinking. He asks Omovo for some money to pay the rent.

After waking up, Omovo thinks of his brothers and the complexities of art. He wants to paint but doesn't because he doesn't seem to have a clear vision of what to paint. He leaves to go wait for Ifeyiwa's sign to meet.

Omovo waits for Ifeyiwa and is distracted by Tuwo. He eventually finds and follows her to a room that is far away that her friend let her borrow. They talk about how the local conflict in her hometown has increased. They kiss and make love until Ifeyiwa's husband knocks on the door and says that he saw them walk inside. They wait in silence until he leaves and they escape.

Omovo walks back alone and follows the sound of a cry to find a woman leaving her baby in the forest. He chases her and hears her story of her husband dying. She is convinced to keep her baby and she goes back to find that it was deformed and dead. The "night soil" workers walked through the town and one was made fun of for his walk by children in the compound so he drops his bucket in front of the house. It smells so horribly that the whole compound begs and bargains for him to take it away. Omovo on his walk finds a building that is full of art and a man comes and asks if he would like to attend the initiation of an unknown group, Omovo refuses and is forced to leave.

=== Book Four ===
Ifeyiwa walks home and wanders to find a sickly and injured dog that is kicked by children playing a game. She takes it home to care for it and puts it in the backyard. Her husband has been drinking and is angry and sad as he laments to her of how much he has given her. He takes her on a bike deep into the woods and talks of his painful experience with his father and his father's wives. He tells her to love him and become a great wife, or he will kill her. As he speaks to her, he has cramps in his legs and she helps him, then they leave. At home the dog has disappeared.

In the rain, Omovo walks home until a group of men violently beat him up and he passes out in the woods.

Omovo goes home and Blackie comes to open the door, she is aiding to his injuries as his dad comes home stumbling drunk. His father speaks of hating his mother and how he was joyful when she died because she got in the way of his success and is still haunting him. On hearing this, Omovo is angered and yells at his father that he is a failure and his father cries himself to sleep as Omovo cannot sleep.

Ifeyiwa is very sick after the night in the forest and her husband takes to juju medicine methods to make her feel better. She has a dream that he is sacrificing her for his relatives. Tupko continues to try to feed her but she refuses and wants to leave to be with her mother. Eventually, Ifeyiwa falls back asleep and dreams of killing Tupko, when she wakes up she is recovered and plans an escape as she cleans the house.

In his sickness, Omovo hallucinates that Dr. Okocha is stealing signs and Blackie and Tuwo are having an affair. After three days of being sick, Omovo goes back to work to find that he has been transferred to a different branch, instead of taking that job he collects his money and leaves. With the money Omovo eats at a fancy French restaurant and he eats and it costs a fifth of his salary.

News that Ifeyiwa ran away reaches the town and Tupko attacks Omovo. Then, Omovo packs a bag and gathers his thoughts, he writes a letter to his father and leaves money for the rent. His father reads the letter later and is reminded of his other sons, Umeh and Okur, leaving. He felt tender for Omovo and found the letter as a gesture of love.

Ifeyiwa travels over three hundred miles and is walking the last part of her journey when she hears people call out to her, she can't find herself to speak and they shoot and kill her in fear that she is an enemy. In result, the violence of the conflicting villages increase and they aren't able to reach reconciliation.

=== Book Five ===
Omovo travels to the town of "B-" and stays in a room he describes as musty. He dreams that he finds a mysterious blue door with music coming from it and he wanders many years exploring and hoping to find this door. He becomes old in the dream and realizes he is dying, and then he wakes up from sleeping 18 hours. The Chief of the town and his son Ayo come to his room and Omovo finds Ayo as entertaining. Omovo visits the beach and reflects on his childhood during the civil war. An Igbo undergrad was shot in the back by soldiers in Omovo's old village, young boys then scavenged for money after the death. Omovo continues to wander and he has a big revelation on the state of Africa and the state of the continent and what needs to be done to fix it. The chief of the town dies and Omovo heads home.

A towns member finds Omovo at his house and tells him a story of a party that the compound had while his father was visiting relatives to ask for money. When his father came back, Tuwo and Blackie were engaging in intercourse in the bathroom and he goes and grabs his machete and decapitates Tuwo. Omovo's father goes to the police to turn himself in. Omovo does not react too angrily until the towns member tells him that Ifeyiwa is dead. Omovo then grabs the machete and runs around the compound chasing people until he is almost hit by a car. He collapses in front of a kiosk and Dr. Okocha comes and slaps him twice and takes him to his workshop.

Dr. Okocha talks to Omovo about the darkness of the ghetto, and he lets Omovo stay in his workshop to live and master art. Omovo wakes up and walks around and paints the Atlantic ocean at night with big ships on the beach and a tree in the foreground with the girl who was ritually sacrificed. He isn't satisfied with how the face turns out and leaves her without a face, and he titles the painting "Related Losses" and knows that it will remain unfinished.

Seven years later, Omovo has painted seven Ifeyiwa paintings and he returns to "Related Losses" and repaints the piece to focus more on the girl. He paints a face on the girl as well. Omovo then travels to Keme's house and Keme's mom takes care of him and has him sleep there.

With his father still in prison, Omovo goes to visit him to tell him miscellaneous compound news and his father never speaks. At the end of the visit Omovo mentions that it was his birthday and his dad gives him a lucky chain that Omovo's mother gave him. Keme and Omovo discuss their friends; Okoro was hit by a truck and Dele writes to Okoro from the United States. The two men, Keme and Omovo, talk of their generation being doomed, of Ifewiya and their dangerous love.

In the final chapter, Omovo decides to go to the park and Keme waits for him outside as Omovo goes to the beach and walks through the woods. Omovo senses spirits in the woods and hears someone call his name, he falls and listens to the earth. Eventually, Omovo rises and thinks of how he does not know the future.

== Characters ==
- Omovo: the main character of Dangerous Love, he is a painter and works at a chemical distribution company. Omovo represents a generation of Nigerians that are disappointed with the state of Nigeria in post-independence and following the Nigerian civil-war.
- Ifeyiwa: the love interest of Omovo, she is married to Takpo and has an abusive relationship with her husband.

== Themes ==
=== Nigerian history in Okri's writing ===
As a modern writer, Ben Okri writes of the political issues that one can find in Nigeria in order to inform the Nigerian public his opinion on the future of Nigeria.

On May 30, 1967, a section of Nigeria succeeded as ethnic and political conflict continued, this act marks the beginning of the Nigerian Civil War that is mentioned in Okri's book. Okri also experienced the civil war first hand, as he mentions in this quote, "my education took place simultaneously with my relations being killed and friends who one day got up in class and went out to fight the war."

As Okri portrays life in Lagos post-civil war, he also describes the maturity of a young African artist and his perspective of his role in the future of Nigeria in Dangerous Love.

=== Style ===
Wendy B. Faris from the University of Texas notes a specific trend in Okri's book that she calls "scenic lists" that establish a mysterious and removed perspective of the setting. These lists consist of a series of short sentences and can be found throughout the book. Faris argues that this style creates a voice that connects realistic situations with a magical, spiritual, or "shamanic aura". She characterizes Okri's pieces as "shamanic realism" as he mentions spiritual and supernatural aspects of life throughout his novels.

One example of said "scenic lists" is: "The branches of the palm trees swished and swayed. Women chanted their wares. Cars did dangerous turns."

=== Feminist themes ===
Monica Bongaro, PhD, categorizes Ben Okri as one of the "feminist male authors are making an effort to transcend stand sexual allegories, hence to resolve the problems of gender in ways that run counter to the biases embedded in African male literary tradition."

Okri has stated that he believes that writers have an important role in society to draw attention to issues in society and politics and makes it evident in his portrayal of women as "human beings rather than as qualities or symbols."

Okri utilizes the character Ifeyiwa, and her relationship with Omovo to criticize women's treatment in Nigeria, however, he approaches it as Ifeyiwa understands and confronts her unhealthy marriage. Bongaro states, "With [Ifeyiwa's] sensitivity and delicacy of emotions, and her determination to cope with life in a sordid rat-infested house with a man she hates and to whom she has been married off by her family, Ifeyiwa stands in opposition to the horrifying spectacle of a society undergoing a process of decomposition."

=== Ritual sacrifice ===
In the first book of Dangerous Love, Omovo and his friend Keme find a young girl brutally killed in a ritual sacrifice. This experience appears in Omovo's nightmares and he compares this encounter to his childhood during the civil war where he witnessed the death of various Igbo people.
