= Starbook =

2007 novel by Ben Okri

- First edition
- Author: Ben Okri
- Language: English
- Publisher: Rider
- Publication date: 16 August 2007
- Media type: Print (Hardback)
- Pages: 384
- ISBN: 978-1-84604-082-5
- OCLC: 123798840
- LC Class: PR9387.9.O394 S65 2007

Starbook, subtitled "A Magical Tale of Love and Regeneration", is a 2007 novel by Nigerian poet and novelist Ben Okri.
