= Diana Ejaita =

Nigerian-Italian illustrator and textile designer

Diana Ejaita is a Nigerian-Italian illustrator and textile designer.

== Biography ==
Ejaita was born in Italy. She studied fine art in France and Germany. As of 2020, she was based in Berlin, Germany, and Lagos, Nigeria.

In 2014, Ejaita started a fashion label, called WearYourMask, inspired by West African traditions and her Italo-Nigerian heritage.

In 2019, Ejaita's work was featured in a group exhibition at Berlin's Kunstgewerbemuseum (Museum of Decorative Arts), called Afro Futures. Fashion – Hair – Design. That same year, she illustrated a Google Doodle commemorating the 119th birthday of Funmilayo Ransome-Kuti, a Nigerian educator and women's rights activist. Ejaita has designed four covers for The New Yorker magazine.
