= Julius Stumpf =

19th and early 20th Century German physician

Julius Stumpf (1836 - 1932) was a German physician and scientist who used white clay from Germany to treat a deadly form of Asian cholera, diphtheria, gangrene, ulcers of the tibia and the skin disease eczema. He worked at the University of Würzburg.
