= Ben Okri =

Nigerian writer (born 1959)

Sir Ben Okri OBE FRSL
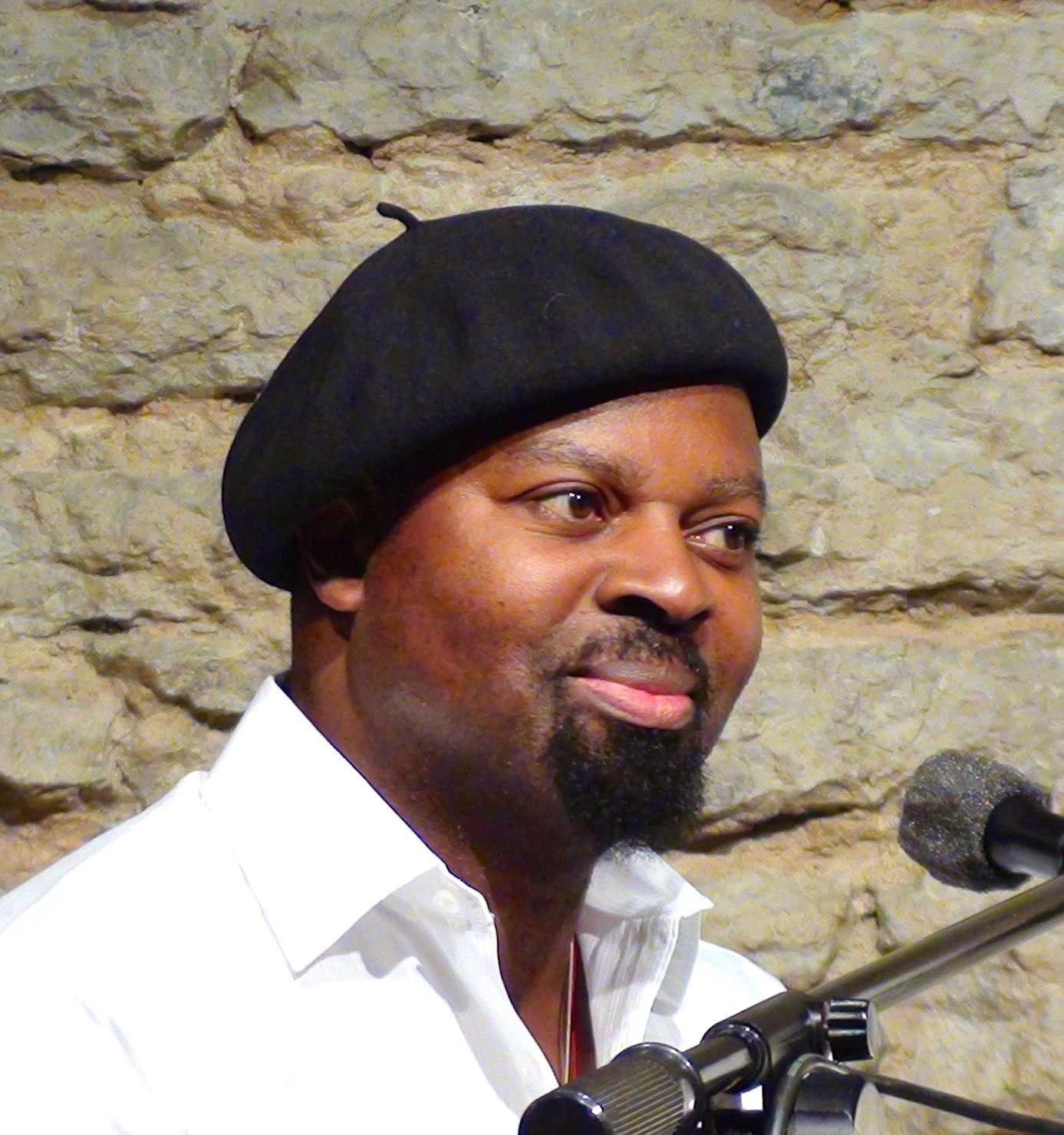
- Born: Ben Golden Emuobowho Okri; 15 March 1959 (age 67); Minna, Nigeria
- Education: University of Essex
- Occupation: Writer
- Writing career
- Genres: Fiction, essays, poetry
- Notable works: The Famished Road (1991), A Way of Being Free (1997), Starbook (2007), A Time for New Dreams (2011)
- Notable awards: Booker Prize 1991
- Movements: Postmodernism, Postcolonialism
- Website: benokri.co.uk

Sir Ben Golden Emuobowho Okri OBE FRSL (born 15 March 1959) is a Nigerian-born British poet and novelist. Considered one of the foremost African authors in the postmodern and post-colonial traditions, Okri has been compared to authors such as Salman Rushdie and Gabriel García Márquez. In 1991, his novel The Famished Road won the Booker Prize. Okri was knighted at the 2023 Birthday Honours for services to literature.

== Biography ==
=== Early years and education ===
Ben Okri is a member of the Urhobo people; his father was Urhobo, and his mother was half-Igbo ("from a royal family"). He was born in Minna in west central Nigeria to Grace and Silver Okri in 1959. His father, Silver, moved his family to London, England, when Okri was less than two years old so that he could study law. Okri thus spent his earliest years in London and attended primary school in Peckham. In 1966, Silver moved his family back to Nigeria, where he practised law in Lagos, providing free or discounted services for those who could not afford it. After attending schools in Ibadan and Ikenne, Okri began his secondary education at Urhobo College at Warri, in 1968, when he was the youngest in his class. His exposure to the Nigerian Civil War and a culture in which his peers at the time claimed to have had visions of spirits provided inspiration for Okri's fiction.

At the age of 14, after being rejected for admission to a short university programme in physics because of his youth and lack of qualifications, Okri experienced a revelation that poetry was his chosen calling. He began writing articles on social and political issues, but these never found a publisher. He then wrote short stories based on those articles, and some were published in women's journals and evening papers. Okri has said that his criticism of the government in some of this early work led to his name being placed on a death list, and necessitated his departure from the country.

=== Move to England, 1978 ===
In 1978, he moved back to England and studied comparative literature at Essex University with a grant from the Nigerian government. But when funding for his scholarship fell through, Okri found himself homeless, sometimes living in parks and sometimes with friends. He has called this period "very, very important" to his work: "I wrote and wrote in that period... If anything [the desire to write] actually intensified."

Okri's success as a writer began when he published his debut novel, Flowers and Shadows, in 1980, at the age of 21. From 1983 to 1986, he served as poetry editor of West Africa magazine, and he regularly contributed to the BBC World Service between 1983 and 1985, continuing to publish throughout this period.

His reputation as an author was secured when his novel The Famished Road won the Booker Prize for Fiction in 1991, making him the prize's youngest ever winner at 32. The novel was written during the time from 1988 that Okri lived in a Notting Hill flat that he rented from publisher friend Margaret Busby, and he has said:

"Something about my writing changed round about that time. I acquired a kind of tranquillity. I had been striving for something in my tone of voice as a writer—it was there that it finally came together.... That flat is also where I wrote the short stories that became [1988's] Stars of the New Curfew."

In 1997, Okri was elected vice-president of the English Centre for International PEN and in 1999 was appointed a member of the board of the Royal National Theatre.

On 26 April 2012, he was appointed vice-president of the Caine Prize for African Writing, having been on the advisory committee and associated with the prize since it was established 13 years earlier.

Okri was appointed as a vice-president of the Royal Central School of Speech and Drama in 2022.

In June 2023, Okri was awarded a knighthood in the King's Birthday Honours for his extensive services to literature.. In May 2025, he published the curated historical anthology African Stories with Everyman's Library and was subsequently honored with the "Icon of The Africa Centre" award in London for his decades of cultural patronage. He was also appointed as a Co-Chair for the final judging panel of the Queen's Commonwealth Essay Competition

== Literary career ==
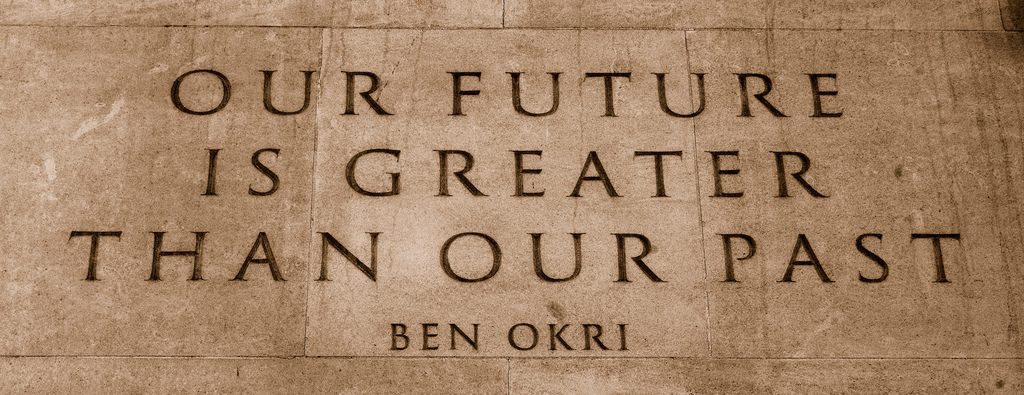
Quote from Okri's Mental Fight on the Memorial Gates, London

Since the 1980 publication of Flowers and Shadows, Okri has risen to international acclaim, and he often is described as one of Africa's leading writers.

His best known work, The Famished Road, which won the 1991 Booker Prize, along with Songs of Enchantment (1993) and Infinite Riches (1998) make up a trilogy that follows Azaro, a spirit-child narrator, through the social and political turmoil of an African nation reminiscent of Okri's remembrance of war-torn Nigeria.

Okri's work is particularly difficult to categorise. It has been widely called postmodern, but some scholars have noted that the seeming realism with which he depicts the spirit-world challenges this categorisation. If Okri does attribute reality to a spiritual world, it is claimed, then his "allegiances are not postmodern [because] he still believes that there is something ahistorical or transcendental conferring legitimacy on some, and not other, truth-claims." Alternative characterisations of Okri's work suggest an allegiance to Yoruba folklore, New Ageism, spiritual realism, magical realism, visionary materialism, and existentialism.

Against these analyses, Okri has always rejected the categorisation of his work as magical realism, claiming that this categorisation is the result of laziness by critics and likening it to the observation that "a horse ... has four legs and a tail. That doesn't describe it." He has instead described his fiction as obeying a kind of "dream logic" and said that it is often preoccupied with the "philosophical conundrum ... what is reality?" insisting that:

I grew up in a tradition where there are simply more dimensions to reality: legends and myths and ancestors and spirits and death ... Which brings the question: what is reality? Everyone's reality is different. For different perceptions of reality we need a different language. We like to think that the world is rational and precise and exactly how we see it, but something erupts in our reality which makes us sense that there's more to the fabric of life. I'm fascinated by the mysterious element that runs through our lives. Everyone is looking out of the world through their emotion and history. Nobody has an absolute reality.

Okri has noted the effect of personal choices: "Beware of the stories you read or tell; subtly, at night, beneath the waters of consciousness, they are altering your world."

As well as novels, Okri's published books include collections of poetry, essays and short stories. His short fiction has been described as more realistic and less fantastic than his novels, but it also depicts Africans in communion with spirits, while his poetry and nonfiction have a more overt political tone, focusing on the potential of Africa and the world to overcome the problems of modernity.

Okri has also written plays and film scripts, such as the text to Peter Krüger's film N – The Madness of Reason, which won the 2015 Ensor Award for Best Film. In 2018, Okri adapted Albert Camus's novella The Outsider as a play for the Print Room at The Coronet Theatre.

In April 2019, Okri gave the keynote address at the second Berlin African Book Festival, curated by Tsitsi Dangarembga.

Okri's volume of collected poems, A Fire in My Head: Poems for the Dawn, was published in 2021, its title inspired by a line in Wole Soyinka's poem "Death in the Dawn": "May you never walk / when the road waits, famished."

Alongside his writing, Okri has maintained an interest in visual art since his youth, and in 2023, he collaborated with colourist painter Rosemary Clunie in Firedreams, at the Bomb Factory, Marylebone, an exhibition of "WordArt" that featured large-scale paintings and sculptural obstructions. Okri and Clunie, his long-time friend, had previously brought together their paintings and stories in the 2017 book The Magic Lamp: Dreams of Our Age.

== Influences ==
Okri has described his work as influenced as much by the philosophical texts on his father's bookshelves as by literature, and cites the influence of Francis Bacon and Michel de Montaigne on his A Time for New Dreams. His literary influences include Aesop's Fables, Arabian Nights, Shakespeare's A Midsummer Night's Dream, and Samuel Taylor Coleridge's The Rime of the Ancient Mariner. Okri's 1999 epic poem, Mental Fight, is named after a quotation from the poet William Blake's "And did those feet ...", and critics have noted a close relationship between Blake and Okri's poetry.

Okri also was influenced by the oral tradition of his people and, particularly, by his mother's storytelling: "If my mother wanted to make a point, she wouldn't correct me, she'd tell me a story." His firsthand experiences of civil war in Nigeria are said to have inspired many of his works.

On the final day of the 2021 COP26 climate meeting in Glasgow, Okri wrote about the existential threat posed by the climate crisis and how ill‑equipped humans seem to confront the prospect of their self-inflicted extinction. Indeed, Okri says: "We have to find a new art and a new psychology to penetrate the apathy and the denial that are preventing us making the changes that are inevitable if our world is to survive."

== Honours and awards ==
Okri was knighted as a Knight Commander of the Order of the British Empire (KBE) in the 2023 Birthday Honours for services to literature,"No. 64082". The London Gazette (Supplement). 17 June 2023. p. B2. having previously been appointed Officer of the Order of the British Empire (OBE) in the 2001 Birthday Honours."Ben Okri: A writer honoured". BBC News. 13 June 2001.

- 1987: Commonwealth Writers Prize (Africa Region, Best Book) – Incidents at the Shrine
- 1987: Aga Khan Prize for Fiction – The Dream Vendor's August
- 1988: Guardian Fiction Prize – Stars of the New Curfew (shortlisted)
- 1991–1993: Fellow Commoner in Creative Arts (FCCA), Trinity College, Cambridge
- 1991: Booker Prize – The Famished Road
- 1993: Chianti Ruffino-Antico Fattore International Literary Prize – The Famished Road
- 1994: Premio Grinzane Cavour (Italy) -The Famished Road
- 1995: Crystal Award (World Economic Forum)
- 1997: Honorary Doctorate of Literature, awarded by University of Westminster
- 1997: Fellow of the Royal Society of Literature
- 1999: Premio Palmi (Italy) – Dangerous Love
- 2002: Honorary Doctorate of Literature, awarded by University of Essex
- 2003: Chosen as one of 100 Great Black Britons
- 2004: Honorary Doctor of Literature, awarded by University of Exeter
- 2008: International Literary Award Novi Sad (International Novi Sad Literature Festival, Serbia)
- 2009: Honorary Doctorate of Utopia, awarded by Universiteit voor het Algemeen Belang, Belgium
- 2010: Honorary Doctorate, awarded by the School of Oriental and African Studies, University of London
- 2010: Honorary Doctorate of Arts, awarded by the University of Bedfordshire
- 2014: Honorary Doctorate from the University of Pretoria
- 2014: Honorary Fellow, Mansfield College, Oxford
- 2014: Bad Sex in Fiction Award, Literary Review
- 2020: Honorary Doctorate of Literature awarded by Nelson Mandela University
- 2025: Icon of The Africa Centre Award (London) for outstanding lifelong contributions to African literature and cultural patronage

== Works ==
=== Novels ===
- Flowers and Shadows (Harlow: Longman, 1980)
- The Landscapes Within (Harlow: Longman, 1981)
- The Famished Road (London: Jonathan Cape, 1991)
- Songs of Enchantment (London: Jonathan Cape, 1993)
- Astonishing the Gods (London: Weidenfeld & Nicolson, 1995)
- Dangerous Love (London: Weidenfeld & Nicolson, 1996)
- Infinite Riches (London: Weidenfeld & Nicolson, 1998)
- In Arcadia (Weidenfeld & Nicolson, 2002)
- Starbook (London: Rider Books, 2007)
- The Age of Magic (London: Head of Zeus, 2014)
- The Freedom Artist (London: Head of Zeus, 2019)
- Every Leaf a Hallelujah (London: Head of Zeus, 2021)
- The Last Gift of the Master Artists (London: Bloomsbury Publishing, 2022)
- Madame Sosostris and the Festival for the Brokenhearted (London: Bloomsbury Publishing, 2025)

=== Poetry, essays and short story collections ===
- Incidents at the Shrine (short stories; London: Heinemann, 1986)
- Stars of the New Curfew (short stories; London: Secker & Warburg, 1988)
- An African Elegy (poetry; London: Jonathan Cape, 1992)
- Birds of Heaven (essays; London: Phoenix House, 1996)
- A Way of Being Free (essays; London: Weidenfeld & Nicolson: 1997; London: Phoenix House, 1997)
- Mental Fight (poetry: London: Weidenfeld & Nicolson, 1999; London: Phoenix House, 1999)
- Tales of Freedom (short stories; London: Rider & Co., 2009)
- A Time for New Dreams (essays; London: Rider & Co., 2011)
- Wild (poetry; London: Rider & Co., 2012)
- The Mystery Feast: Thoughts on Storytelling (West Hoathly: Clairview Books, Ltd, 2015)
- The Magic Lamp: Dreams of Our Age, with paintings by Rosemary Clunie (Apollo/Head of Zeus, 2017)
- Prayer for the Living: Stories (London: Head of Zeus, 2019)
- A Fire in My Head: Poems for the Dawn (London: Head of Zeus, 2021)
- Tiger Work (London: Apollo, an imprint of Head of Zeus, 2023)
- African Stories (edited anthology; London: Everyman's Library, 2025)

=== As editor ===
- Rise Like Lions: Poetry for the Many (London: Hodder & Stoughton, 2018, ISBN 9781473676152)
- African Stories (London: Everyman's Library Pocket Classics, 2025, ISBN 9781841596372)

=== Film ===
- N – The Madness of Reason (feature film, directed by Peter Krüger, 2014)

=== Online fiction ===
- "A Wrinkle In The Realm". The New Yorker. 1 February 2021.
