= Medicinal clay =

Use of clay in health care

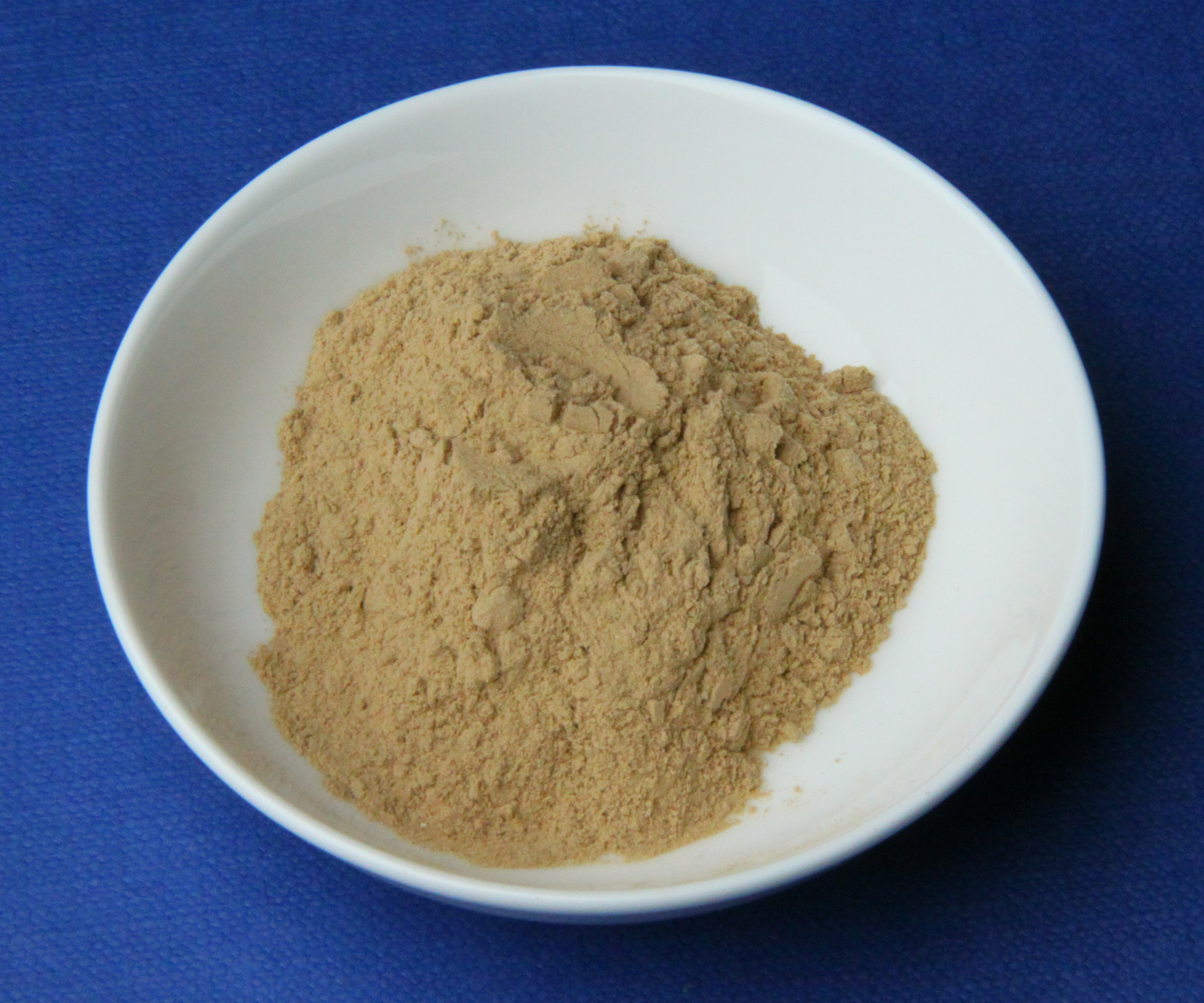
German medicinal clay (Luvos Heilerde) consisting of loess, i.e., a mixture of sand, clay, and silt

The use of medicinal clay in folk medicine goes back to prehistoric times. Indigenous peoples around the world still use clay widely. Such uses include external application to the skin and geophagy. The first recorded use of medicinal clay goes back to ancient Mesopotamia.

A wide variety of clays are used for medicinal purposes—primarily for external applications, such as the clay baths in health spas (mud therapy). Among the clays most commonly used are kaolin and the smectite clays such as bentonite, montmorillonite, and fuller's earth. However, their use is declining, and modern evidence-based medicine has ended the use of many types.

== History ==
=== Ancient Egypt and Mesopotamia ===
The first recorded use of medicinal clay is on Mesopotamian clay tablets around 2500 BC. Also, ancient Egyptians used clay. The Pharaohs’ physicians used the material as anti-inflammatory agents and antiseptics. It was used as a preservative for making mummies and is also reported that Cleopatra used clays to preserve her complexion.

The Ebers Papyrus of about 1550 BC is an important medical text from ancient Egypt which contains traditional advice going back many centuries earlier. It describes the use of ochre for a wide variety of ailments, including for intestinal problems.

=== Classical times ===
==== Lemnian Earth ====
Lemnian Earth was extracted on the island of Lemnos starting from classical antiquity and continued to be in use until the 19th century, and was still listed in an important pharmacopoeia in 1848. The clay was shaped into tablets with distinctive seals stamped into them, giving rise to its name terra sigillata—Latin for 'sealed earth'. The earliest mention of its application as a medicine appears in Dioscorides’ De Materia Medica, dated to approximately 50–70. Many other classical authors, including Pliny and Galen, recommend Lemnian Earth for the treatment of poisonings, open wounds and other illnesses.

==== Other clays used in classical times ====
The other types of clay that were famous in antiquity were as follows.

- Terra chia, Terra cymolia (Cimolean earth): these were both white earths and considered of great value.
- Samian earth: Pliny in c. 50 AD (Nat. Hist.) details two distinct varieties, colyrium - an eye salve, and aster, which was used as a soap as well as in medicines.
- Terra sigillata strigoniensis (Strigian earth, derived from Silesia) - this clay, yellow in colour, appears to have been famous later in medieval times.

All the above seem to have been bentonitic clays.

- The earth which did not stain the hands was known as rubrica.

=== Medieval times ===
In medieval Persia, Avicenna (980–1037 CE), the 'Prince of Doctors', wrote about clay therapy in his numerous treatises.

Ibn al-Baitar (1197–1248), a Muslim scholar born at Malaga, Spain, and author of a famous work on pharmacology, discusses eight kinds of medicinal earth. (Note: For further discussion see: Leclerc, L (1881). Traite des Simples (in French). Vol. II. pp. 421–7.; Baron Carra de Vaux (1921). Les Penseurs de L'islam (in French). Vol. II. pp. 289–96. Cited in Laufer (1930)) The eight kinds are:

1. the terra sigillata,
2. Egyptian earth,
3. Samian earth,
4. earth of Chios,
5. Cimolean earth or pure clay (cimolite), soft earth, called al-hurr, green in color like verdigris, is smoked together with almond bark to serve as food when it will turn red and assume a good flavor; it is but rarely eaten without being smoked—also called 'Argentiera',
6. earth of vines called ampelitis (Pliny XXXV, 56) or pharmakitis from Seleucia in Syria,
7. Armenian earth (also known as the Armenian bole), salutary in cases of bubonic plague, being administered both externally and internally,
8. earth of Nishapur.

=== Renaissance period ===
French naturalist Pierre Belon (1517–1564) was interested in investigating Lemnian Earth. In 1543, he visited Constantinople where, after making enquiries, he encountered 18 types of different products marketed as Lemnian Earth. He then made a special journey to Lemnos, where he continued his investigation, and tried to find the source of the clay. He discovered that it was extracted only once a year under the supervision of Christian monks and Turkish officials.

In 1588 the English ethnographer and translator Thomas Harriot wrote in A Briefe and True Report of the New Found Land of Virginia that Algonquians of the mid–Atlantic region of North America treated various sores and wounds with wapeih, "very like to terra sigillata" that English surgeons and physicians found to be of the same kind "of vertue and more effectuall" than the contemporary European sort.

== Preparation of clay ==
Clay gathered from its original source deposit is refined and processed in various ways by manufacturers. This can include heating or baking the clay, since the raw clay tends to contain a variety of microorganisms. (Note: "Soil, including kaolinitic and montmorillonitic clays, contains considerable amounts of organic material, including many live microorganisms.")

Too much processing, likewise, may reduce the clay's therapeutic potential. In particular, Mascolo et al. studied 'pharmaceutical grade clay' versus 'the natural and the commercial herbalist clay', and found an appreciable depletion of trace elements in the pharmaceutical grade clay. On the other hand, certain clays are typically heated or cooked before use. (Note: An example of this is the medieval 'Argentiera' clay, mentioned in this article.)

Medicinal clay is typically available in health food stores as a dry powder, or in jars in its liquid hydrated state – which is convenient for internal use. For external use, the clay may be added to the bath, or prepared in wet packs or poultices for application to specific parts of the body.

Often, warm packs are prepared; the heat opens up the pores of the skin, and helps the interaction of the clay with the body. (Note: "Hot application is recommended in geotherapy, pelotherapy or paramuds in beauty therapy...")

In the European health spas, the clay is prepared for use in a multitude of ways – depending on the traditions of a particular spa; typically it is mixed with peat and matured in special pools for a few months or even up to two years.

"The majority of spas … use artificial ponds where the natural ("virgin") clay is mixed with mineral, thermo-mineral, or sea water that issues in the vicinity of the spas or inside the spa buildings."

=== Trace minerals ===
Clays contain large amounts of trace minerals. It is common to see as many as 75 different trace minerals in Montmorillonite clays. Specific trace minerals that various clays possess vary very widely. Also, the amount of any particular trace mineral in any specific clay varies a lot among clays from different locations. For example, the amount of iron in various bentonite clays can vary from 2.5 to 3%.

== Uses ==
=== Skin conditions ===
Many skin conditions have been treated by the application of medicinal clay. Montmorillonite has shown its effectiveness in this area. It has also been used as a base ingredient for tissue engineering. Clay is used in many dermatological over-the-counter remedies, such as in acne treatments though this information may not be specifically mentioned on the label.

=== Internal use ===
There are many over-the-counter remedies for internal (oral) use that contained clay before discontinuation. Examples included Kaopectate (Upjohn), Rheaban (Leeming Div., Pfizer), and Diar-Aid (Thompson Medical Co.). The labels on all of these showed the active ingredient to be Attapulgite, each tablet containing 600 (or 750 mg) of this component along with inert materials or adjuvants. However, since April 2003, attapulgite medication was discontinued due to lack of evidence according to the U.S. Food and Drug Administration.

Kaolin was also used to treat cholera around the start of the 20th century. An early proponent was German physician Julius Stumpf.

=== Heavy metal chelation ===
It has been used as a scientifically unsupported chelation treatment for heart disease and autism.

=== Aflatoxicosis ===
Bentonite has the ability to reduce the adverse effects of aflatoxicosis.

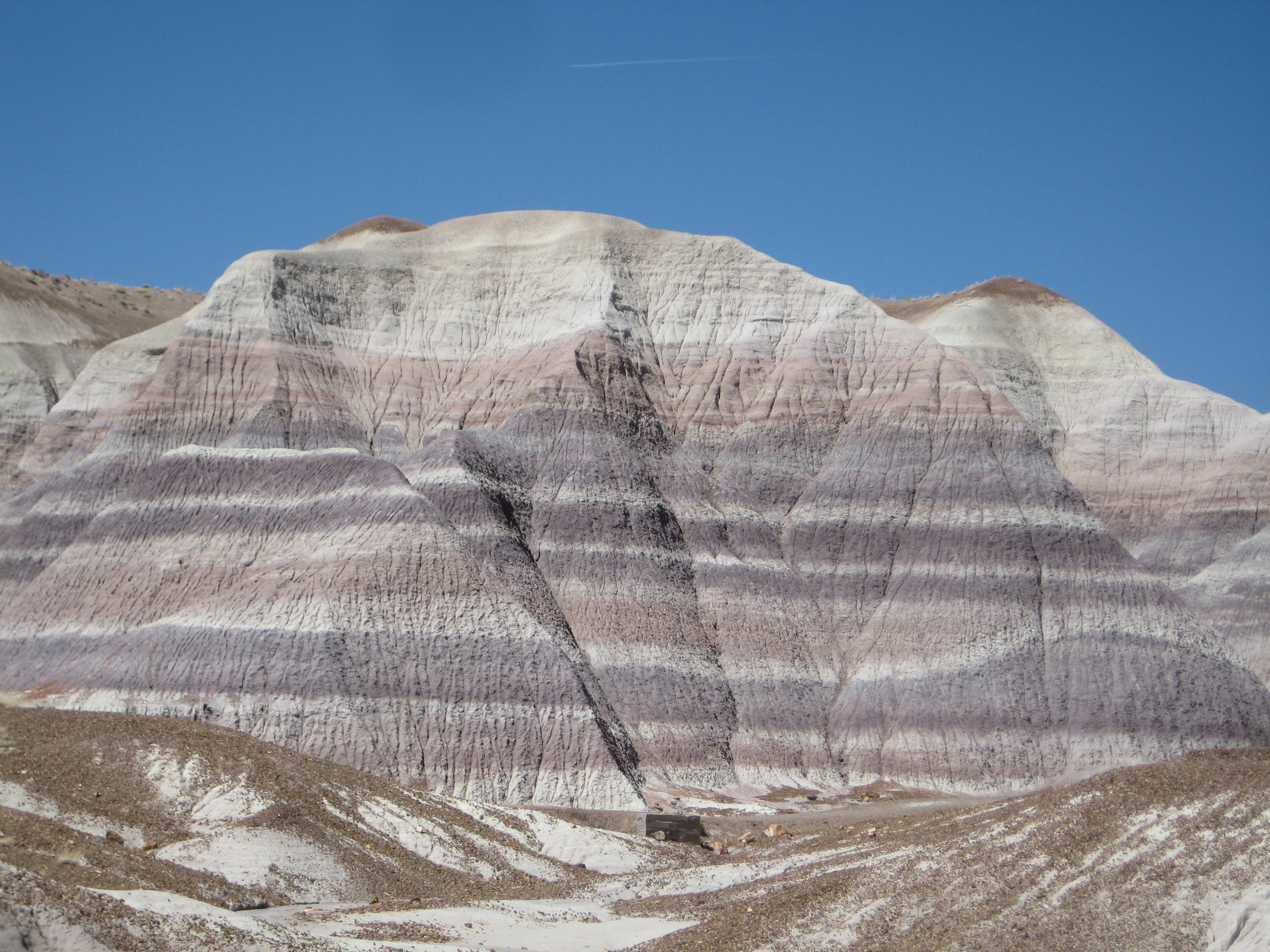
A mountain of clay — Petrified Forest National Park, Arizona. The white bands represent pure bentonite clay.

== Side effects of ingestion ==
Substances discontinued such as kaolin and attapulgite were formerly considered gastric demulcents and diarrhea medication, until official studies by the USFDA disproved these views. Clays are classified as excipients and their main side-effects are that of neutral excipients, which is to impair and slow down absorption of antibiotics, hormones and heart medication amongst others by coating the digestive tract and this slowed down absorption can lead to increased toxicity of some medication (e.g. citrate salts) which can become toxic if not metabolized quickly enough, which is one contraindication of attapulgite. Usual mild side-effects are nausea, slowed down absorption of nutrients from food (in excess dosage of medicinal clay) and constipation. It has been found that prolonged exposure to bentonite in humans can actually have harmful effects.

== Common medicinal clays ==
- Bentonite-type clay has been used to treat infections, indigestion, and other medical problems by both applying wet clay topically to the skin as a poultice, and by ingesting it. Bentonite has been prescribed as a bulk laxative, and it is also used as a base for many dermatologic formulas. Dermatologically, it is used as part of a treatment for pruritus. Bentonite itself is not classified as a carcinogen, but some bentonite may contain variable amounts of respirable crystalline silica, a human carcinogen.
- Montmorillonite is the main constituent of bentonite and Heilerde loess. A medical preparation is called diosmectite.
- Palygorskite or attapulgite is a very absorbent clay, somewhat similar to bentonite. When used in medicine, it physically binds to acids and toxic substances in the stomach and digestive tract. For this reason, it has been used in several anti-diarrheal medications, but studies of such have since been rejected by the U.S. Food and Drug Administration as insufficient.
- Kaolin is not as absorbent as most clays used medicinally (it has a low shrink–swell capacity). Also, it has a low cation exchange capacity. This clay is also known as 'white cosmetic clay'. Clay, in the form of kaolin, was a common ingredient in western medicines such as Kaopectate, Rolaids and Maalox, but is no longer present in them nor in similar preparations, as it is considered ineffective by the USFDA.

== See also ==
- Diatomaceous earth
- Peloid
- Zeolite
- Fuller's earth
