= Land reform in Germany =

There have been several land reforms in Germany, also known by the German term Bodenreform.

== Reforms in the Kingdom of Prussia ==
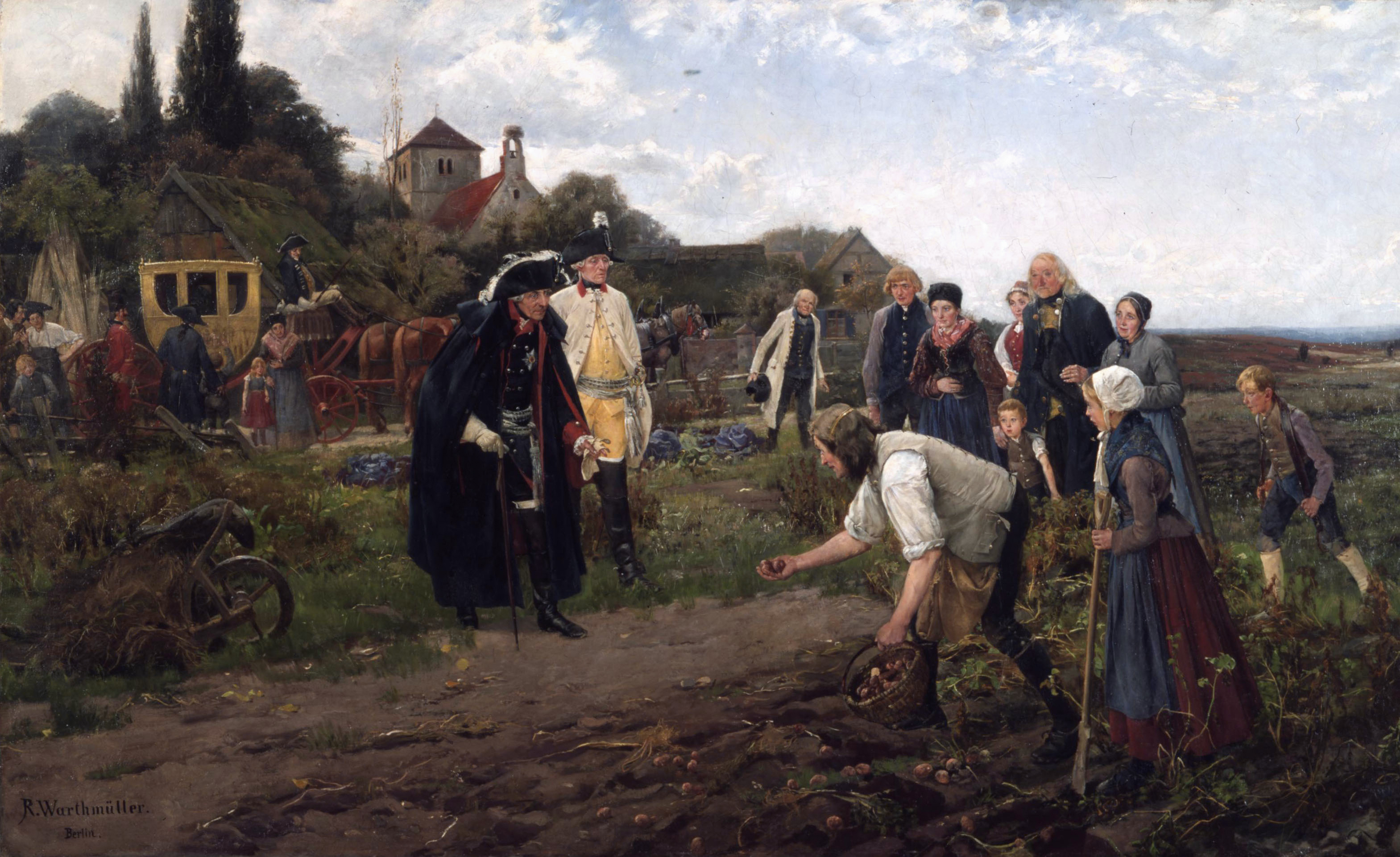
Frederick II inspecting his lands and talking to potato growers.

- In 1763, Frederick II of Prussia abolished serfdom on all Crown lands. Additionally, he issued an order to end the suppression of the peasant, relieving him and his children of domestic services to the landlord. His intentions were good – he believed that peasants should be well treated in order to function properly. But his reform did not have much effect, because the peasants had no land, and thus were forced to return to serving their previous lords in return for a right to till their lands.
- In 1798, Frederick William III of Prussia expressed his royal desire to see serfdom abolished throughout the kingdom, and permitted peasants to redeem their corvée for cash payments. He also secured the rights of precarious tenants.
- In 1806, Prussia was defeated by Napoleon I and lost half its territory in the second of the Treaties of Tilsit. This was the trigger for the Prussian reforms, whose main goal was to modernize the Prussian state so that it might regain its lost power. As part of these reforms, serfdom was legally abolished throughout the kingdom. Peasants were allowed to become free proprietors of land, if they could buy it. Since peasants had no money, they were allowed to pay for the land by giving up their rights to assistance from their landlords and giving up their rights to use common lands for grazing. Alternatively, they could "pay" by giving some of their lands to their landlords. The net outcome was that the peasants' situation actually worsened: they had less land to till, and no access to common lands. On the other hand, the nobles could buy much of the peasants' lands and gained exclusive access to the common lands; so landholding became more concentrated: just the opposite of what the reformers intended.
- Over the next three decades, the government made it easier for peasants to buy land, as part of a sweep towards liberal sentiment in much of western Europe.
- After the Revolutions of 1848 in the German states, peasants refused to pay their remaining obligations to their landlords. Most of these obligations were legally abolished at 1850. The price for redeeming land was set at 25 times its annual revenue, and peasants could buy land by taking mortgages from banks.
- In 1850, Prussia began its settlement policies with the Gesetz zur Erleichterung der Ablösung durch Rentengutsverfahren. The Bauernregeln of 1859 forbid the monopolization of land by landlords.

== From 1850 to 1945 ==
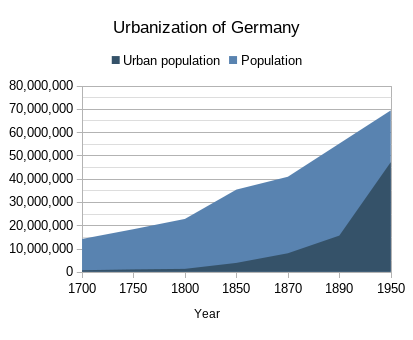
Population and urban population of Germany (1700 to 1950)

=== Reform theories ===
Due to technological, medical and agricultural advances, the population of Germany rapidly grew and urbanized in the 19th century. In the 1830s, land reforms began to be discussed in Europe by various influential socialist and communist economists such as Karl Marx, Friedrich Engels, Karl Kautsky and Eduard Bernstein.

An early proponent of land reform in Germany was Hermann Gossen with his 1854 book Die Entwicklung der Gesetze des menschlichen Verkehrs und der daraus fließenden Regeln für menschliches Handeln. The Austrian Theodor Hertzka published the utopian novel Freiland, ein soziales Zukunftsbild (Freeland - A Social Anticipation) in 1889, promoting emigration to the "empty" new world. In opposition to this, Franz Oppenheimer published Freiland in Deutschland (Freiland in Germany) in 1894, arguing for cooperative-based settlements in Germany. Both agreed that it was possible to overcome capitalism not through political conquest but by cooperative economic subversion which would naturally lead to social justice. Although critical of their theories, Freiland can be seen in the tradition of Owenism and Fourierism, and it paralleled the opinions of Marx and Engels. It was also highly influential towards the founding document of Zionism, Der Judenstaat (The Jewish State), authored by Theodor Herzl in 1896. He also published a direct reply to Oppenheimer in his 1902 Altneuland (The Old New Land).

Inspired by the reform theories, the late 19th century also featured the parallel development of hundreds of ideologically motivated settlements which were sometimes funded cooperatively or by the government.

=== Government actions ===
In 1886 the Prussian Settlement Commission was created in West Prussia and Posen motivated by racist beliefs to increase the Germanization of former Polish territories. In 1914 there were 29,053 such settlements with 174,000 inhabitants, but only 7,089 of these were settlements of agriculture workers.

In the early 20th century, the Commission oversaw developing administrative infrastructure for interior colonization in the German Reich such as centers of counseling, pension banks, cooperatives and private settlement companies like the Pommersche Ansiedlungsgesellschaft(1903) and Ostpreußische Landgesellschaft(1905). Dense city centers were untangled through the use of suburbs, allotment gardens and garden cities. Related publications were collected in the Archiv für innere Kolonisation beginning in 1908.

At the beginning of the First World War, ideas originated for the accommodation of soldiers returning from war, such as settlements for war invalids, soldiers' homesteads and peace-cities, as well as interior colonisation on a larger scale.

The Reichssiedlunggesetz ("Imperial Settlement Act") was passed in 1919. This law transformed around 16,172 ha (about 62 sq miles) of marshes and wasteland into 1,761 new settlements between 1919 and 1928. To hasten the resettlement of refugees from Poland the Flüchtlingssiedlungsgesetz ("Refugee Settlement Act") was passed in 1923, leading to the relocation of about 2,500 refugees.

Although settlements had been discussed as means to relieve urban poverty since 1918, results were "sobering". Only 26,343 new settlements were created between 1919 and 1928; and 21,602 of these were in Prussia. This meant that only 25% of the intended area (Landlieferungssoll) of 1,413,706 ha (about 5,500 sq miles) was achieved.

In 1931 three new laws were passed to create 100,000 new settlements. But the cabinet was overturned in May 1932 due to accusations of "Settlement Bolshevism".

== After World War II ==
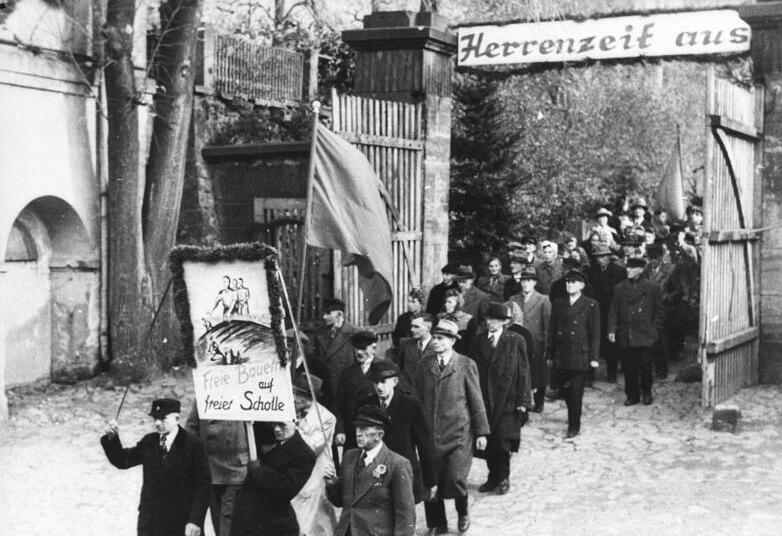
Procession demonstrating the dissolution of the knight's estate Helfenberg (near Dresden), September 1945.

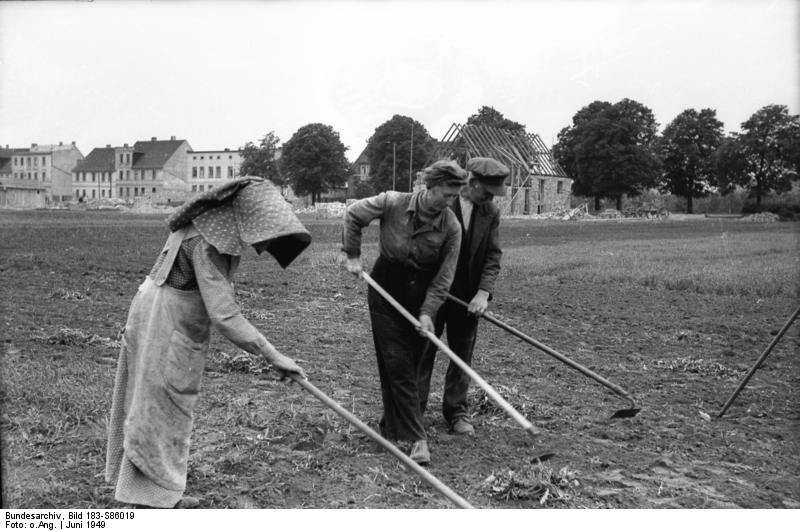
Newly made farmers in Groß-Ottersleben (Magdeburg), June 1949

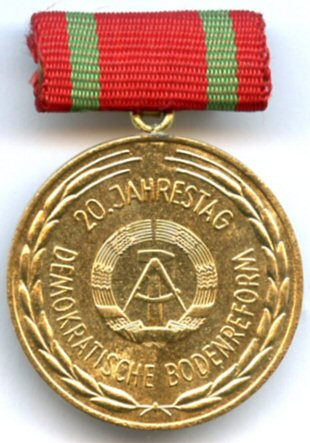
Medal commemorating the 20th anniversary of the Bodenreform in East Germany, issued 1965

The land reforms in both East and West Germany had three main goals:

- to end the conservative political influence of land barons.
- to reallocate and integrate refugees from the former eastern territories and citizens displaced by bombings.
- to enforce greater flexibility and efficiency in short-term agricultural production.

The communist Bodenreform in East Germany nationalised all private property exceeding an area of 100 hectares (247 acres), and redistributed it to publicly owned estates.

Since 1990, after German reunification, some Junkers tried to regain their former estates through civil lawsuits, but the German courts have upheld the land reforms and rebuffed all claims for compensation.

== See also ==
- Association of German Land Reformers
- Land reforms in other countries
- Flurbereinigung
- Land reform in East Germany
- History of German settlement in Central and Eastern Europe
- Flight and expulsion of Germans (1944–1950)
- Landesausbau
- Ostsiedlung
- Drang nach Osten
- Freiwirtschaft
- List of German utopian communities
