= Miracle Mile (Manhasset) =

Shopping district in Nassau County, New York

Coordinates: 40.793°N 73.692°W

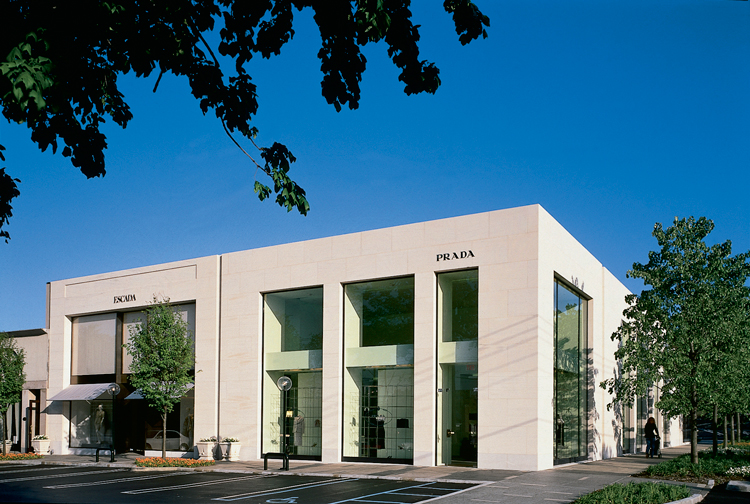
Stores at the Americana Manhasset

The Miracle Mile is a prominent shopping district in the Greater Manhasset area of in Nassau County, on the North Shore of Long Island, in New York, United States. It consists of the area along Northern Boulevard (NY 25A) between Community Drive to the west, and Port Washington Boulevard (NY 101) and Searingtown Road to the east.

== History ==
Much of the corridor was initially developed in the 1950s by Sol Atlas. It was named the Miracle Mile in reference to the Los Angeles neighborhood, and inspired by its rapid development after decades of depression and war, and the difficulty in developing a commercial corridor in a primarily residential area.

The Miracle Mile has been a suburban shopping destination, known for its later high-end premium open-air shopping center and anchor – the Americana Manhasset.

For many years, it also featured a Lord & Taylor – often referred to as the first branch store in America. The Miracle Mile has also had branches of many notable New York City area stores – including B. Altman & Co., Bonwit Teller, Abraham & Straus (and subsequently Macy's), Best & Co., Arnold Constable, Franklin Simon & Co., Peck & Peck, H&M, W. & J. Sloane, and a J.J. Newberry.

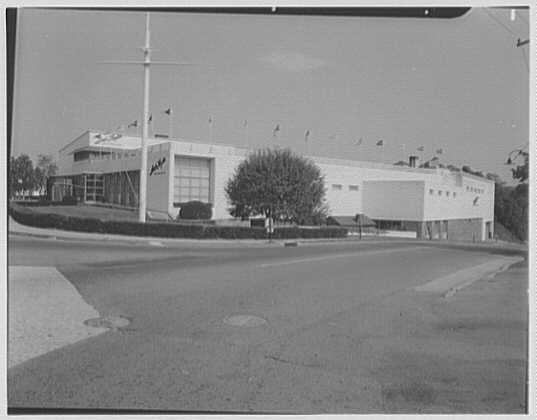
The former Lord & Taylor branch on Northern Boulevard, when it was new

In August 2020, it was announced that Lord & Taylor would be closing all remaining stores – including its flagship Miracle Mile location; the store closed in February 2021 and became a SaksWorks. The building would eventually become an ambulatory care center for NYU Langone Health later in the 2020s.

== Transportation ==
The Miracle Mile is served by the following bus routes – all of which are operated by Nassau Inter-County Express (NICE) and run along Northern Boulevard:

- n20H (Great Neck LIRR – Hicksville LIRR)
- n20X (Flushing – Roslyn Clock Tower)
- n21 (Great Neck LIRR – Glen Cove)

== In popular culture ==
The Miracle Mile is mentioned in the Billy Joel song "It's Still Rock and Roll to Me".

== See also ==
- Fifth Avenue
