= Franklin Simon =

American businessman

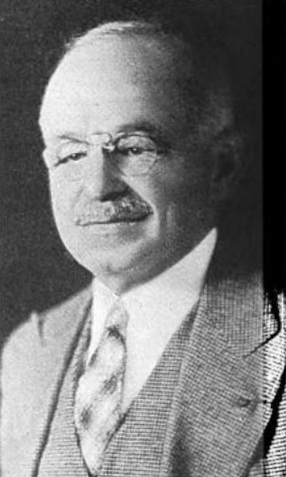
- Born: February 7, 1865; New York City, New York
- Died: October 4, 1934 (aged 69); Purchase, New York
- Resting place: Woodlawn Cemetery
- Occupation: Businessman
- Known for: Franklin Simon & Co.
- Awards: Legion of Honor

Franklin Simon (February 7, 1865 – October 4, 1934) was an American businessman who was the owner of Franklin Simon & Co., a department store in Manhattan, New York City. The store was founded in February 1902, when Simon partnered with Herman A. Flurscheim.

== Early life ==
Franklin Simon was born on New York City's Lower East Side in 1865 to Henri and Helene Simon. He had three brothers and three sisters. Simon's father was a cigar-maker and wood carver, his mother a seamstress. After his father's untimely death in 1878, Simon found work at a cash-boy at Stern Brothers, a dry goods store located at 32–36 West 23rd Street. One of the store's principals, Louis Stern, befriended young Simon, teaching him the "ropes" of dry goods.

By age 21, Simon was earning $5000 per year, a considerable sum at that time. In 1892, Simon married Frances Carroll, the daughter of a New York City sheriff. The couple had four children: Franklin Simon Jr., who died July 3, 1902, Arthur J. Simon (1892–1968); Helene Simon (1895–?); and George D. Simon (1898–1944).

As his responsibilities at Stern Brothers increased, Simon was sent overseas to Paris as a buyer for the firm. It was during one of these business trips that Simon became acquainted with Herman A. Flurscheim, one of Stern Brothers' principal suppliers in France. The two became friends and soon made plans to go into business together, importing French fashions into the United States.

== Founding Franklin Simon & Co. ==
By 1902 Simon had saved approximately $100,000. In a daring move, Simon and Flurscheim purchased the home of Mrs. Orme Wilson, sister of John Jacob Astor IV, at 414 Fifth Avenue as the site of their new venture, Franklin Simon & Co., a store of "individual shoppes". At that time, Fifth Avenue was primarily a residential street, and Simon's merchant contemporaries derided his choice of location, speculating that the business would be a total failure.

Franklin Simon & Co. opened its doors for business in February 1902. The venture lost $40,000 during its first year of operation and $28,000 during its second. However, by 1904 Fifth Avenue was coming into its own as a fashion center and the store turned a $16,000 profit. From that point forward, Franklin Simon & Co. remained one of the preeminent Fifth Avenue fashion outlets until its dissolution in the 1970s.

== Fifth Avenue success and retail innovations ==
Perhaps the first person to view Fifth Avenue as a major retail and fashion center, Simon initiated "Buyers Week" and "Market Week", thus revolutionizing how manufacturers and retailers presented and sold new fashions and simultaneously generating millions of dollars in business for the surrounding neighborhood. By 1922, Simon was known amongst his contemporaries as a "merchant prince", and was one of the leading figures in setting the fashion trends of the day.

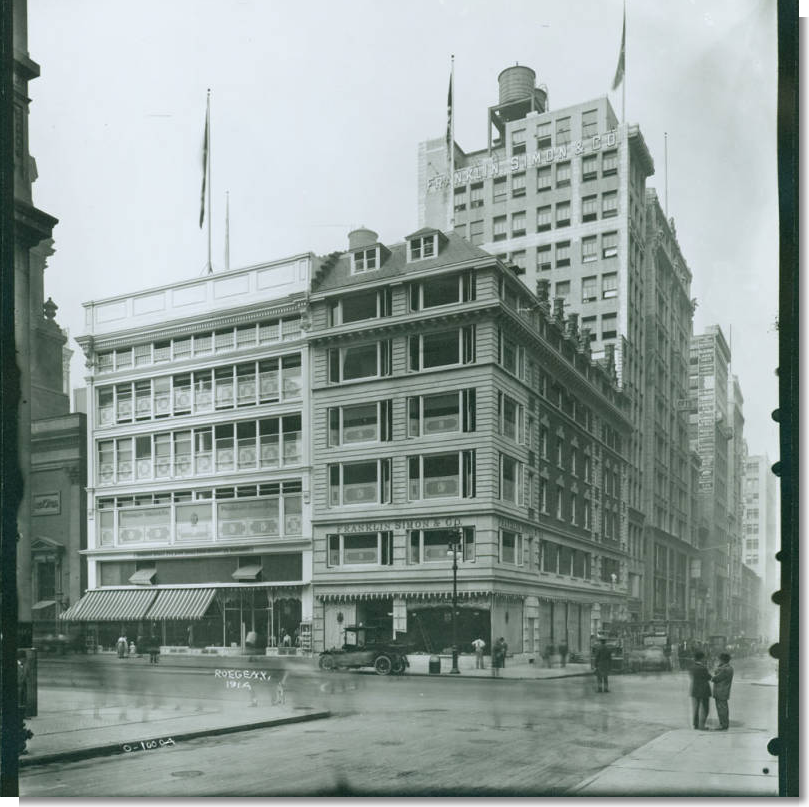
Franklin Simon & Co., c. 1915

Simon's approach to advertising was, in many ways, revolutionary. He employed visionary artists such as Norman Bel Geddes and Donald Deskey. Their talent helped change the future of department store display windows, creating futuristic designs that stopped traffic on Fifth Avenue. Simon was also the first Fifth Avenue merchant to offer on-site parking for his customers, a plan he devised himself.

To combat slumping sales, Simon originated the concept of "blue light" sales, by instructing his in-store salespeople to mark down items with blue pencils while customers were looking on. Simon was also the first merchant to suggest the use of outlet stores as a way to sell out of season merchandise. This was the first known use of such a sales tactic.

To dissuade piracy and trademark infringement, Simon was ferocious in protecting his brand and was not afraid to use the courts to enforce his legal rights.

The success of Simon's original Fifth Avenue establishment was followed by more openings across the country. In 1932, Simon opened his first expansion in Greenwich, Connecticut. Later expansions followed in Manhasset, Long Island – on the "Miracle Mile", Palm Beach, Florida, and several other locations. The site of the Manhasset store would later be developed into Americana Manhasset.

In the 1930s, Franklin Simon & Co. would be the first retail store on Fifth Avenue to remain open until nine o'clock in the evening, a remarkable "experiment" that ultimately proved a success and left a lasting impact on the retail industry in the United States.

== Personal life ==
Mr. Simon was a noted philanthropist. He was a regular contributor to The New York Times' One Hundred Neediest Cases. After the Titanic disaster in 1912, Mr. Simon provided clothes and financial support for two French orphans rescued from a lifeboat. He published the little girls' picture in major newspapers with the hope of finding their family. He insured they had whatever they needed at no cost.

Mr. Simon also received France's highest honor, the Legion D'Honneur. Mr. Simon was named as a chevalier of the Legion for "having done more than any other person to put U. S. women into French clothes."

Civic minded, Mr. Simon was elected chairman of the centennial committee to save Monticello, Thomas Jefferson's home; bound for demolition if not for Mr. Simon's efforts. He was also the director of the Hospital for Joint Diseases and a member of the board of governors of the Stuyvesant Square Hospital. Simon was a member of the Empire State Luncheon Club, Westchester Country Club, Quaker Ridge Golf Club, Uptown Club and the National Democratic Club. Simon was also on the board, and later served as vice president of the Fifth Avenue Association, an influential group of public officials and Fifth Avenue merchants that included Ezra Fitch, Robert Adamson, Lucius M. Boomer and Eliot Cross.

== Death ==
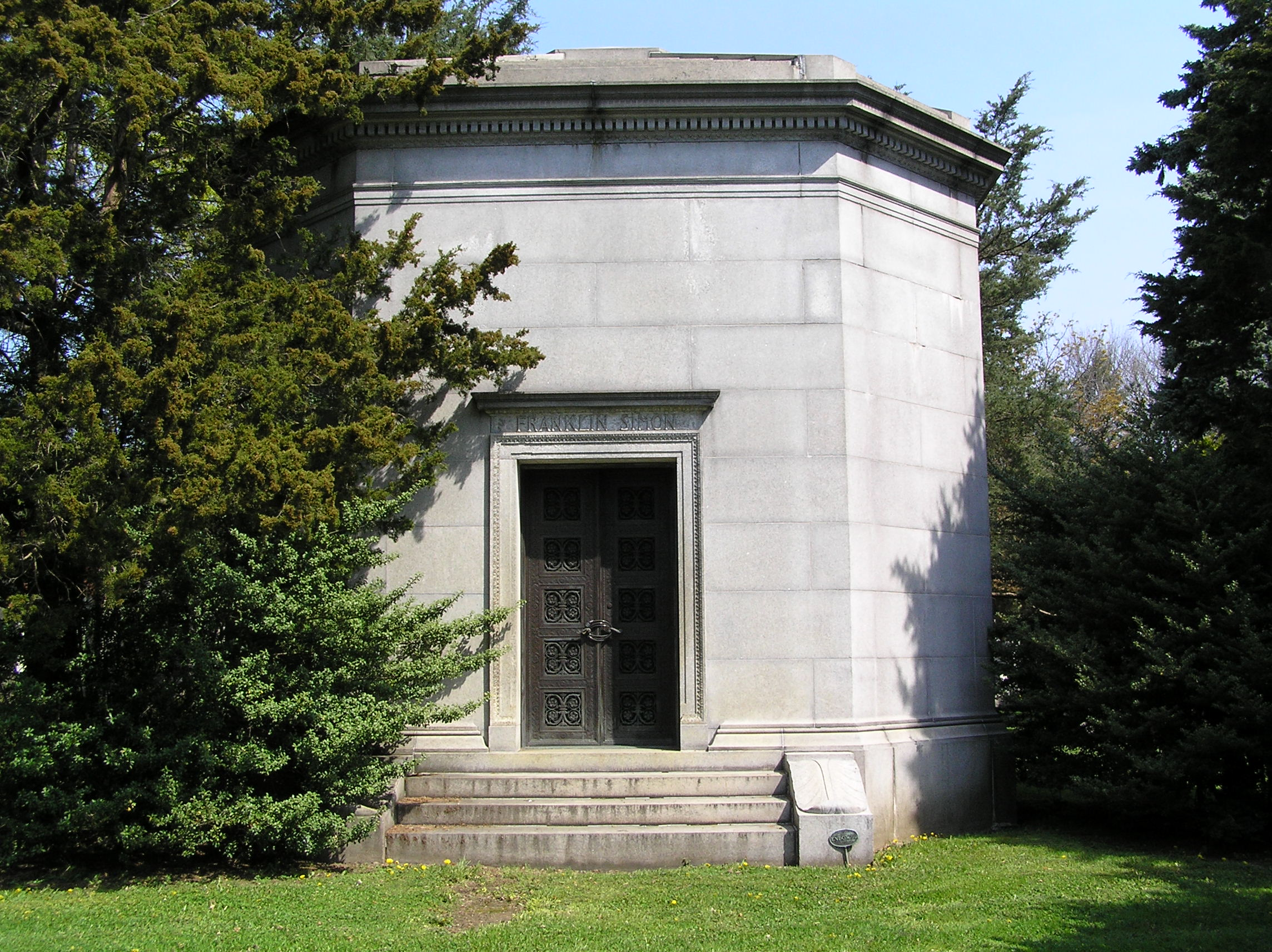
Franklin Simon's mausoleum in Woodlawn Cemetery, in the Bronx.

Franklin Simon died in his country home at Purchase, New York on October 4, 1934, from kidney failure.

After his death, several of the great merchants of New York paid tribute to Mr. Simon, including Percy Straus, president of Macy's, and Bernard Gimbel, president of Gimbel Brothers. Isaac Lieberman, president of Arnold, Constable & Co. remarked that "Mr. Franklin Simon was one of the pioneer merchants of Fifth Avenue and has probably done more to develop Fifth Avenue as a fashion centre than any other single person." The New York Times, in an editorial celebrating Simon's achievements wrote "What need of imposing a 'code' upon a man like him? He was his own code – always one of honor and humanity."

Simon's funeral was a grand affair, with Governor Herbert Lehman sending his condolences and arranging a funeral cortege along the Hutchinson River Parkway.

At the time of his death, Simon left a gross estate of approximately $2,394,751 to his wife. Calculated for inflation, Simon's personal estate, excluding Franklin Simon & Co., was worth approximately $42 million in 2013 dollars. After Simon's death, his widow sold a controlling interest in Franklin Simon and Co. to the Atlas Corporation in September 1936.

Mr. Simon is buried at Woodlawn Cemetery, in the Bronx.
