= Franklin Simon & Co. =

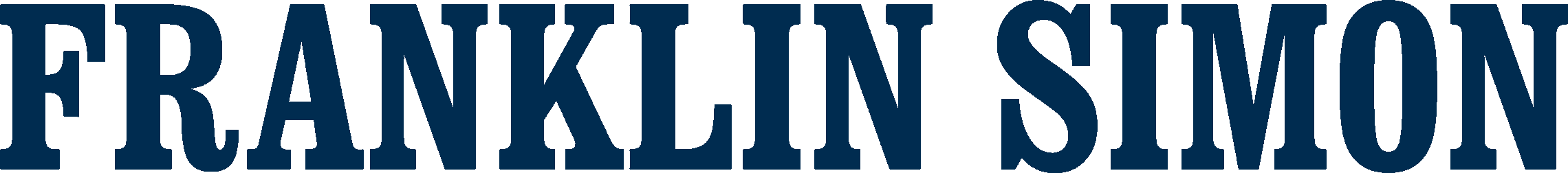

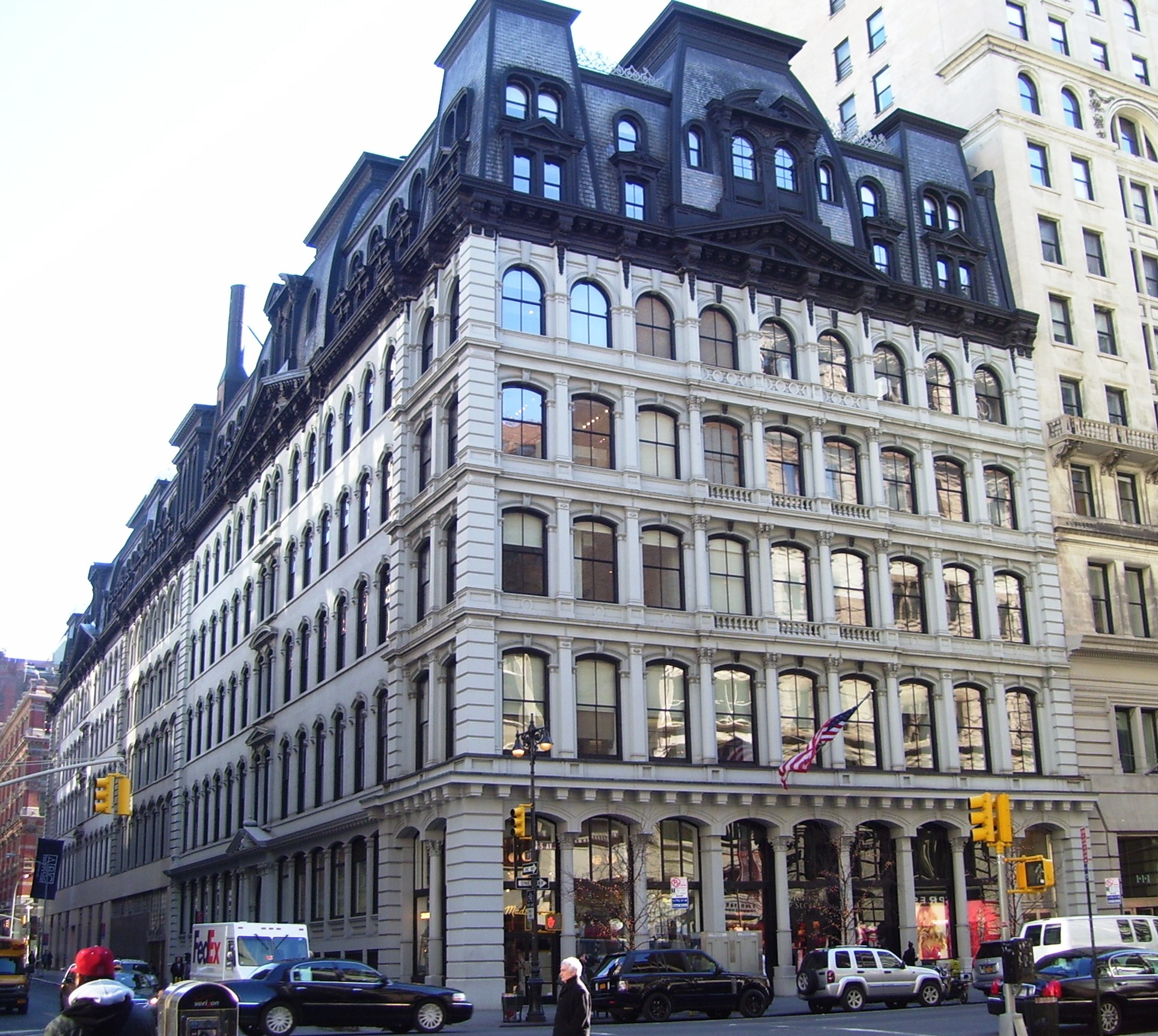
- Flagship store at 19th and Broadway
- Industry: Retail
- Founded: 1902
- Defunct: 1979
- Fate: Bankruptcy
- Headquarters: New York, New York
- Key people: Franklin Simon, founder
- Products: Fashion apparel, shoes, accessories, and cosmetics
- Parent: City Stores Company

Franklin Simon & Co. was a New York City-based department store chain specializing in women's fashions and furnishings. The store was conceived as a collection of specialty shops rather than a traditional U.S. dry goods store. Each "shop" had a specialty product line, such as ready-to-wear apparel for women, misses, girls, boys, men, young men and infants. When the chain closed in 1979, there were 42 stores.

== History ==
The chain was founded in February 1902, as Franklin Simon Specialty Shops by Franklin Simon (1865–1934) and his business partner Herman A. Flurscheim. Leroy C. Palmer became president of the company in 1934 at the death of Franklin Simon, and Benjamin Goldstein was the head of Franklin Simon until 1963. The store's concept was "to import much of his merchandise [from Europe] with a view to selling the imported goods as cheaply, if possible, as the domestic."

In 1936, the chain was purchased by Atlas Corporation from the Simon family for $2 million. In 1945, Franklin Simon & Co. was acquired by City Stores Company of Philadelphia. Oppenheim Collins & Company, Inc merged with Franklin Simon, but the two chains continued to operate under separate trade names and as separate divisions under the newly formed City Specialty Stores. In 1961/1962, City Stores changed the name of the Oppenheim Collins & Co. stores to Franklin Simon. City Stores filed for Chapter 11 bankruptcy in July 1979. Under the reorganization plan, City Stores closed the 42 Franklin Simon stores.

In 1993, Dover Books on Costume reissued the "Franklin Simon Fashion Catalog for 1923".

== Flagship store ==
The main store was established in 1903, at 414 Fifth Avenue at 38th Street, the former home of Carrie Schermerhorn Astor, sister of John Jacob Astor, and her husband Marshall Orme Wilson. It was the first big Fifth Avenue store above 34th Street. The store closed in 1977. A 280,000-square-foot (26,000 m^{2}) building st 19th and Broadway, built in 1868–1877 as Arnold Constable Dry Goods Store, later became its flagship, and of W. & J. Sloane, another subsidiary of City Stores.

== Branch stores ==
In 1932, Franklin Simon & Co. opened its first branch store in Greenwich, Connecticut. Other early branch locations were at Westport, Connecticut, on the Boston Post Road, near the intersection of South Compo Road, and Manhasset, New York (on Long Island). There were also stores in The Swifton Center Cincinnati, Ohio, in the Highland Plaza shopping center in Memphis, Tennessee; Green Acres Mall in Valley Stream, New York; the Cross County Shopping Center in Yonkers, New York; Central Avenue in East Orange, New Jersey; and Livingston Mall, in Livingston, New Jersey. Founder Franklin Simon also operated a resort shop at Palm Beach, Florida, in 1932. Branch stores also operated in the Buffalo, New York, area. Stores operated in the greater Cleveland area as well, on the West Side and at Shaker Square. When the chain closed in 1979, there were 42 stores.
