= Oppenheim Collins =

American women's clothing store chain

Oppenheim Collins & Company, Inc.
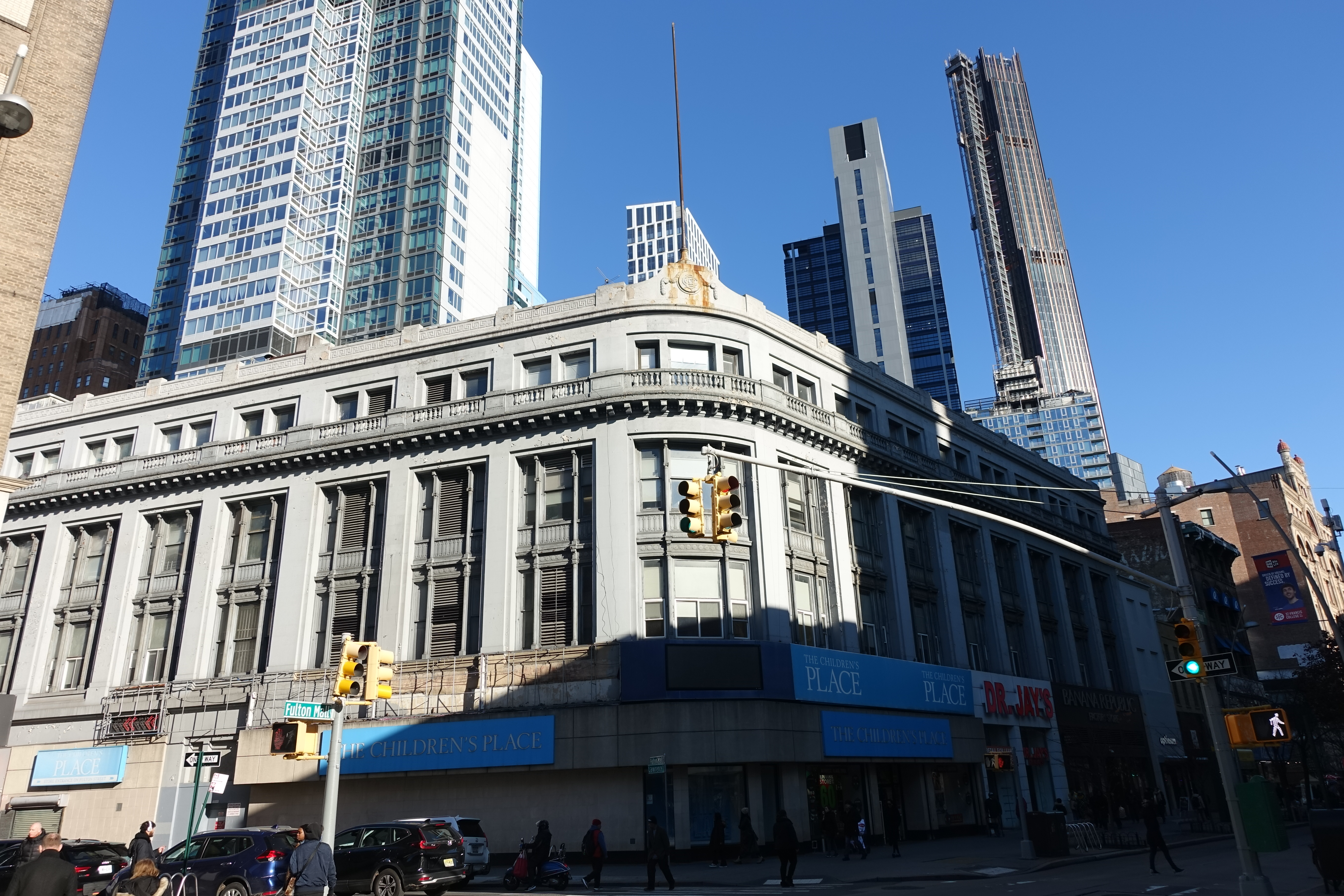
- The former Fulton Street location in Downtown Brooklyn.
- Industry: Retail
- Founded: 1871
- Defunct: 1979 (closing of stores); 1961 (name retired and folded into other divisions); 1945 (takeover by City Stores)
- Fate: Bankruptcy
- Headquarters: 35 W 34th St, New York, New York
- Key people: Albert D. Oppenheim, Charles J. Oppenheim, founders, and Isaac D. Levy
- Products: Fashion apparel, shoes, accessories, and cosmetics.
- Parent: City Stores Company

Oppenheim Collins was a major women's specialty clothing store, headquartered in New York City, New York.

== History ==
=== Founding ===
Oppenheim Collins & Company, Inc. was founded by Albert D. Oppenheim and Charles J. Oppenheim, and was later joined by Isaac D. Levy. Their first store was opened in 1901 in downtown New York City.

=== Branch stores ===
In 1905, a branch store opened at 534 Main Street, in Buffalo, New York. The store expanded to include the Miss Vincent's Tea Room and was remodeled in 1935 and in 1951.

By 1915, the firm had stores in five cities, including New York City (Brooklyn and Manhattan), Philadelphia, Cleveland, and Newark. The flagship was the 34th Street store in Manhattan.

In 1922 there were seven stores. The branch on Fulton Street, Brooklyn, was expanded to (100,000 square feet (9,300 m^{2})), making it the largest branch of the seven stores at that time. It occupied the full block from Bridge Street to Lawrence Street. Despite its size, Oppenheim, Collins clarified that it was not a department store, but a women’s specialty store.

In 1956, a suburban Buffalo location opened at Thruway Plaza in Cheektowaga, New York. The "Top of the Town" restaurant operated out of the Downtown Buffalo store. The Buffalo area stores closed in 1979, along with others in the Franklin Simon & Co. chain with the bankruptcy of City Stores. Later expansion in the 1950s, led to the first store outside of New York. In 1958, Oppenheim Collins opened a location in the new Harundale Mall in Glen Burnie, Maryland.

=== Unionization ===
In 1944, Local 1250 of the Retail, Wholesale and Department Store Union, CIO won a new contract with Oppenheim Collins that included a closed shop, a $2.00 pay increase, and elimination of "free" overtime work during peak sales and inventory periods.

In 1948, Oppenheim Collins employees, represented by Local 1250 of the Retail, Wholesale and Department Store Union, CIO, struck against the company.

=== City stores ===
A majority interest in Oppenheim Collins was purchased by City Stores Company in 1945. In the 1950s, the store was merged with Franklin Simon & Co. although the two stores operated for several years under their original trade names. The Oppenheim Collins stores were finally renamed Franklin Simon & Co. in 1961. The parent company went bankrupt in 1979, and all the Franklin stores closed (including former Oppenheim stores).

=== Presidents ===
- Isaac D. Levy, - 1934
- James C. Bolger, 1934 -
- Robert D. Levy, - 1941
- Otto L. Kinz, 1941 - 1945
- Philip N. Cohan, 1947 - 1949
- Gordon K. Greenfield, 1949 -
