= W. & J. Sloane =

Luxury furniture and rug store in New York City

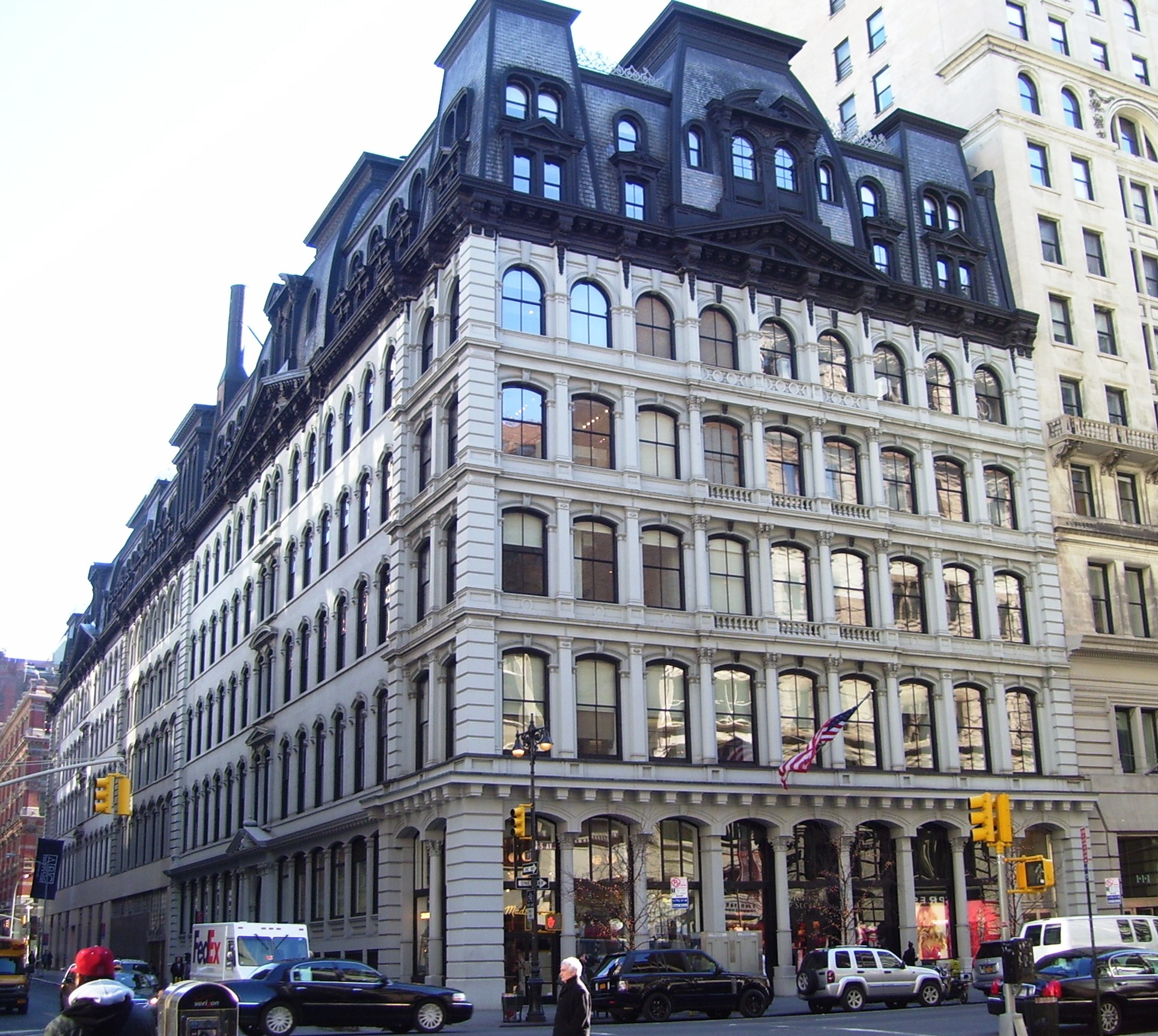
- Flagship store at 19th and Broadway
- Industry: Retail
- Founded: March 7, 1843
- Defunct: September 11, 1985
- Fate: Bankruptcy
- Headquarters: New York City, U.S.
- Key people: William Sloane, founder William D. Sloane, treasurer
- Products: Rugs and home furnishings
- Parent: City Stores Company (starting in 1955)

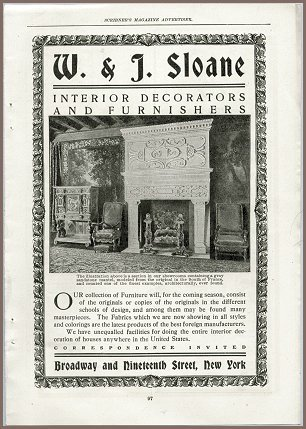
W. & J. Sloane advertisement from September 1902

W. & J. Sloane (also known as W&J Sloane or Sloane's) was a chain of furniture stores that originated from a luxury furniture and rug store in New York City that catered to the prominent, including the White House and the Breakers, and wealthy, including the Rockefeller, Whitney, and Vanderbilt families.

After a long period of prosperity, nationwide expansion and prominence, the firm went through a short period of decline and was forced to file for bankruptcy in 1985.

== History ==
On March 2, 1843, the company was founded as a rug importer and seller by William Sloane, who had just emigrated from Kilmarnock, Scotland, a town famous for expensive furniture, fine carpets and rugs. Its teak and jute resources came from East Bengal (present day Bangladesh). In 1852, his younger brother John W. Sloane joined the firm, upon which it was renamed W. & J. Sloane, followed by William's son William D. Sloane. It was the first company to import oriental carpets into the United States. It soon expanded to include furniture and other home furnishings, and quickly became the choice of the elite in New York.

In 1875, Sloane's established an outlet for the import of carpets and home furnishings in San Francisco.

In the late 19th century, the company added an antiques department, started producing furniture, and became the first home furnishings store in the country, billing itself as "W. & J. Sloane Interior Decorators and Home Furnishers." Its flagship store was originally located at Broadway and 19th Street, in "Ladies' Mile", relocating later to 414 Fifth Avenue at 38th Street, the former flagship of Franklin Simon & Co.

=== Taste-setter for America ===
In 1891, W. & J. Sloane incorporated and set the national decorating taste of the United States, and over the next sixty years decorated the homes of the most prominent people in the country, including the Breakers and the White House, created Hollywood movie sets, and even designed and decorated interiors of automobiles. It opened a branch in San Francisco, California originally to furnish pavilions at the 1915 Panama-Pacific Exposition (it also furnished the model homes at the 1939 New York World's Fair). It later acquired other upscale firms such as the California Furniture Company, and in 1925 a subsidiary, the Company of Master Craftsmen was founded by William Sloane Coffin Sr. (the father of the Rev. William Sloane Coffin) to create Colonial Revival furniture.

=== San Francisco ===
In March 1909, Sloane's moved from Van Ness and Market and the next month held the grand opening of its grand new, 120,000 sq ft (11,000 m^{2}), 9-story Gothic/Renaissance-style flagship store near Union Square at 216–228 (now 222) Sutter Street, designed by Reid & Reid, which still bears the W. & J. Sloane sign as part of its cladding.

=== Washington, D.C. ===
In March 1926, Sloane's moved its small Washington, D.C. store on H Street near the White House into much larger quarters at 708–12 12th St. near G St., site of a present-day Macy's in the F Street shopping district. It would later move again to Connecticut Avenue in the Dupont Circle.

=== Los Angeles stores ===
In 1928, it acquired the California Furniture Company and converted its store at the Joseph E. Carr Building, 644–6 S. Broadway in Downtown Los Angeles, built in 1908-9 and designed by architect Robert Brown Young, to the W. & J. Sloane Los Angeles store. The building would later (1947–1980) serve as the second downtown flagship of local clothing chain Harris & Frank. In 1935 it closed and moved to the then-new upscale shopping district, Beverly Hills. The building at 9536 Wilshire Boulevard on the corner of Rodeo Drive would later house a branch of Los Angeles-based Haggarty's Furniture, and from 1972 to 1987, Bonwit Teller. Sloane's first Beverly Hills location was so successful that it soon moved to larger quarters next door, which would become a Gumps after Sloane's demise.

During World War II the company worked with the Newport News Company and the North Carolina Shipbuilding Company on shipbuilding contracts for the United States Navy fitting out the interiors of liberty ships under the direction of John Sloane Griswold.

=== Suburban expansion ===
In 1955, after a three-year internal struggle, control of the firm left the hands of a direct descendant of the Sloanes when Benjamin Coates, 37, was elected president. This meant the ouster of president W.E.S. Griswold Jr. and chairman of the board John D. Sloane, both grandsons of the founders. Coates was a financier who married John D. Sloane's daughter in 1944 and served on the board. Along with the City Stores Company syndicate, he bought up 70% of the stock to win control and become head of the firm.

After the store left family hands, further growth over the decades was characterized as "over-expansion" while Sloane's lowered the price and quality of its goods during this period. Sloane's opened New York City-area suburban US branches in Garden City, Manhasset, on Post Road in White Plains, Fashion Center in Paramus, Short Hills, Red Bank, Fox Pavilion in Jenkintown, PA outside Philadelphia, and in Connecticut at Ridgeway Center in Stamford as well as in Hartford, for an eventual total of 15.

=== Decline ===
City Stores was forced to file for bankruptcy in 1979 so that it could "continue operating while it works out a plan to pay its creditors."

Sloane's was then acquired by Hollywood-based RB Furniture in 1981. The chain closed its 38th Street store in 1984, and filed for bankruptcy on September 11, 1985. Its remaining stores were sold in 1986.

== Legacy ==
The company generated considerable wealth for the direct descendants of William and John Sloane, who include in addition to the Rev. Mr. Coffin, diplomat Cyrus Vance, attorney Cyrus Vance Jr., musical producer John H. Hammond, his son, musician John P. Hammond, and philanthropist Emily Thorn Vanderbilt Sloane. It also brought the Sloane family into prominence in New York City, where they intermarried with the Whitneys, the Vanderbilts, and the Pynes. Employees who worked for the firm include the American cooking icon Julia Child (then Julia McWilliams), whose first job out of Smith College in October 1935 was Assistant to the New York Advertising Manager, A. W. Forester. Other notables include the Bevelacqua brothers: Salvatore and Aurelio, who designed under the Sloane banner before their respective success in furniture design.
