= Association of German Land Reformers =

German land reform political party (1898–1935)

Association of German Land Reformers Bund Deutscher Bodenreformer
- Abbreviation: BDB
- Leader: Adolf Damaschke
- Founders: Adolf Damaschke; Michael Flürscheim
- Founded: 1898
- Dissolved: c. 1942–43 de jure; 1935 de facto
- Merger of: German Association for Land Ownership Reform; Land League
- Succeeded by: Association for Land and Freedom
- Newspaper: Freiland
- Membership (1920 peak): 60,000–65,000
- Ideology: Georgism
- Political position: Centre to Centre-left

The Association of German Land Reformers (German: Bund Deutscher Bodenreformer) was a German Georgist political party active during the first half of the 20th century. Originally founded as the German Association for Land Reform (Deutscher Bund für Bodenreform) in 1898 from a merger of the German Association for Land Ownership Reform (Deutsche Bund für Bodenbesitzreform) and the Land League (Land-Liga), it was renamed later that same year.^{:75}

Influenced by the theories of the American social philosopher Henry George, the Association was co-founded by Adolf Damaschke [de] and Michael Flürscheim [de],^{:74} and led by Damaschke until his death in 1935. The Association opposed private land monopoly and speculation and positioned itself between liberalism and social democracy on the German political spectrum.

During the Weimar Republic, the Association of German Land Reformers reached the height of its political influence. Under the leadership of Adolf Damaschke, it became one of the most prominent advocates of land‑value taxation and broader land reform. The Association participated actively in public debates on property and taxation and its proposals helped shape discussions surrounding Articles 153 (Note: Article 153 of the Weimar Constitution: Property shall be guaranteed by the constitution. Its nature and limits shall be prescribed by law. Expropriation shall take place only for the general good and only on the basis of law. It shall be accompanied by payment of just compensation unless otherwise provided by national law. [...] Property imposes obligations. Its use by its owner shall at the same time serve the public good.) and 155 (Note: Article 155 of the Weimar Constitution: The distribution and use of the soil shall be controlled by the state in such a manner as to prevent abuse [...]. [...] Landed property the acquisition of which is necessary for the satisfaction of the demand for dwellings [...]. The cultivation and use of the soil shall be the duty of its owner toward the community. An increase in the value of land which accrues without the application of labor or capital to the property shall inure to the benefit of all. All natural resources of the soil and all economically useful forces of nature shall be under the supervision of the state (Staat). Private royalties shall by law be transferred to the state.) of the Weimar Constitution, which addressed property rights and the social obligations of landownership.^{:76} Although it never operated as a mass political party, the Association maintained close ties with liberal and social-democratic circles, organized national congresses, and circulated widely read pamphlets and journals. Its influence was particularly visible in debates over urban housing shortages, rural settlement policy, and the design of the Reich Homestead Act [de], where it promoted measures intended to curb land speculation and expand access to land for smallholders and working-class families.^{:76}

After the Nazi seizure of power in 1933, the Association's activities rapidly diminished. Its Georgist program—centered on liberal economic reform, curbing land monopoly, and promoting legal‑administrative changes to property taxation—was fundamentally incompatible with National Socialist ideology, which prioritized racialized and state‑directed land policy under the banner of Blut und Boden.^{:77} Independent reform organizations lost their political space as the regime consolidated control, and the Association was increasingly sidelined and deprived of opportunities to advocate for its program. The death of Damaschke in 1935 further weakened the organization, leaving it without its principal public figure at a time of tightening authoritarian oversight.^{:77} By the early 1940s the Association had effectively ceased to function, surviving only in name before disappearing entirely during the later years of the war.^{:77}

After the end of the Second World War, former members of the Association attempted to revive the Georgist movement in Germany under the new name Association for Land and Freedom (Bund für Land und Freiheit).^{:77} The initiative sought to reconnect with pre‑1933 Georgist principles and to promote land reform as part of Germany's reconstruction. However, the organization remained small and politically marginal, gaining little influence in the emerging West German party landscape.^{:77} The post‑war group and the broader land‑reform movement never regained the prominence it had held during the Weimar era.^{:77}
