= Adolf Damaschke =

German economist and politician

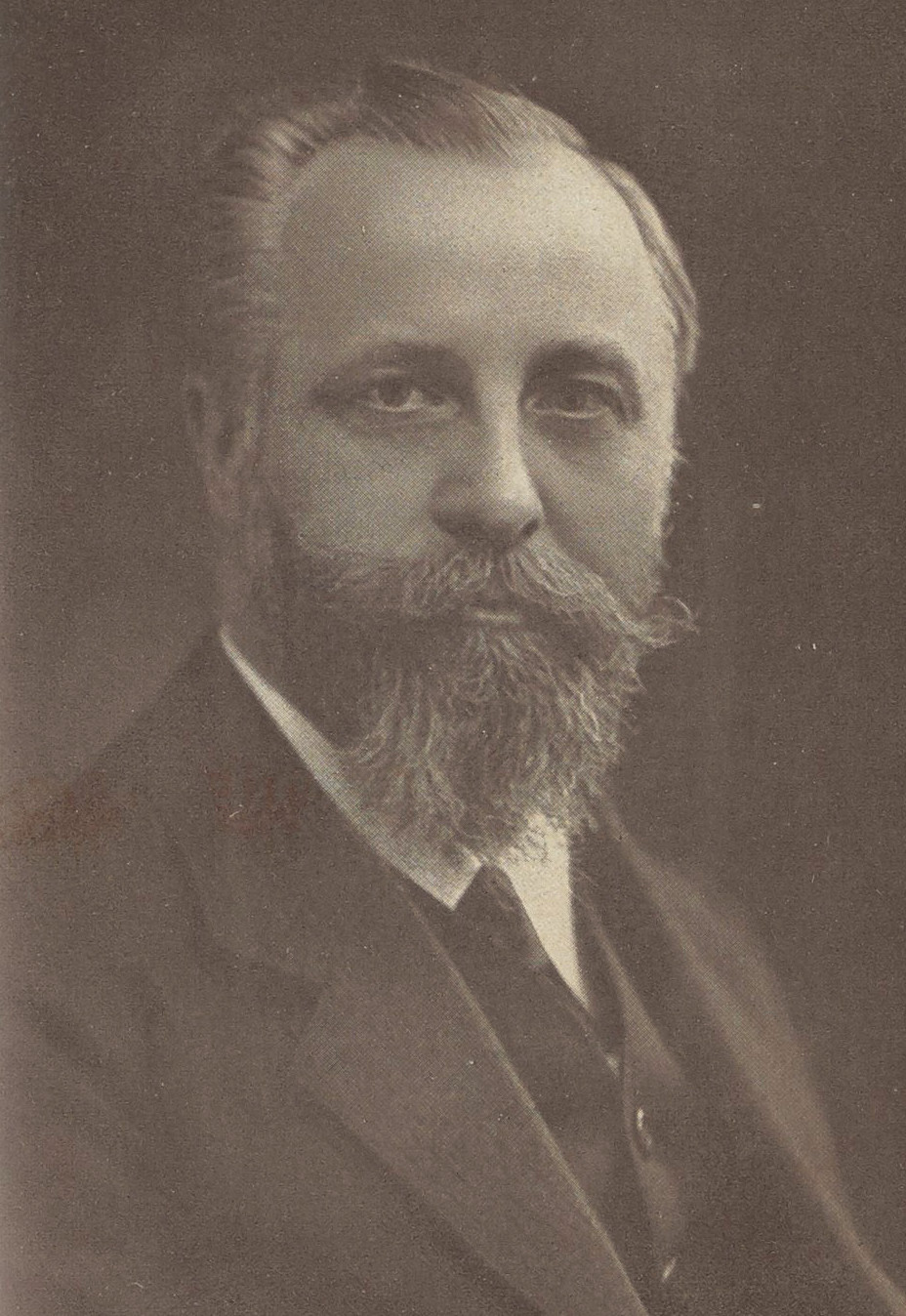
Damaschke c. 1915

Adolf Wilhelm Ferdinand Damaschke (born 24 November 1865, Berlin – 30 July 1935, Berlin) was a German politician and economist (Nationalökonom).

He co-founded the Association of German Land Reformers (Bund Deutscher Bodenreformer) in 1898 with Michael Flürscheim, which he led until his death. He was influenced by Henry George.

== Personal life ==
In 1904 he married Julie Gelzer, daughter of Heinrich Gelzer. They had 3 daughters. Damaschke died of cancer in 1935.

== Literary works ==
- Die Bodenreform, Grundsätzliches und Geschichtliches, 1902
- Bodenreform und Landwirtschaft, 1932
- Ein Kampf um Sozalismus und Nation, 1935

== See also ==
- Silvio Gesell
- Henry George
