= Alfons Bach =

German painter

- Born: 1904; Magdeburg, Germany
- Died: August 19, 1999 (aged 94–95); Pensacola, Florida, U.S.
- Education: Berlin
- Known for: Industrial design, tubular steel furniture
- Notable work: Remodeling of Sach's and the Seneca Textile Building
- Movement: Bauhaus

Alfons Bach (1904 – August 19, 1999) was a German industrial designer and watercolor painter. He is known for his architectural design projects and his tubular steel furniture, which have been described as "icons for their period."

== Early life and career ==
Alfons Bach was born in Magdeburg, Germany. He grew up in Munich. He attended school in Berlin. He moved to the United States in 1926, settling in New York, New York. Before his move, he had studied film and design.

== Career ==
Bach designed the remodeling of Sach's and the Seneca Textile Building, both in New York City. His work was exhibited in early contemporary industrial art shows at the Metropolitan Museum of Art. In 1938 he designed his own home in Stamford, Connecticut. He led the project to build the Ridgeway Shopping Center, one of the first shopping malls in the United States. Bach designed tubular steel furniture in the 1930s for the Lloyd Manufacturing Company. They continued to produce his pieces until 1947. These tubular pieces are considered a link between Bauhaus and modern design style. He moved to Florida in 1959. He designed the Palm Trail Plaza and Palm Trail Yacht Club in Delray Beach. He curated the United States exhibition at the International Industrial Design Exhibition in 1969. He designed work for General Electric, Keystone Silver, Pacific Mills and Bigelow-Samford. He served as president of the American Designers Institute.

== Later life and death ==
In 1992, he moved to Pensacola, Florida where he died in a nursing home on August 19, 1999, at the age of 95.

== Legacy ==
His work is held in the collection of the Cooper-Hewitt, National Design Museum and the Yale University Art Gallery. A set of 17th-century sliding-door panels from a Zen temple in Kyoto, Japan, owned by Bach and his wife, Anita, reside in the collection of the Metropolitan Museum of Art.
