= CSS Industries =

Company that designs, manufactures, and distributes greeting cards and novelties

CSS Industries, Inc.
- Company type: Public
- Traded as: NYSE: CSS
- Industry: Consumer goods
- Founded: 1923 (as City Stores Company)
- Headquarters: Plymouth Meeting, Pennsylvania
- Area served: Worldwide
- Key people: Rebecca C. Matthias (board chair); Christopher J. Munyan (president) & (CEO)
- Products: Craft, seasonal and gift products
- Revenue: ▲$498.25 million (2008)
- Operating income: ▲$38.83 million (2008)
- Net income: ▲$25.36 million (2008)
- Total assets: ▲$345.04 million (2008)
- Total equity: ▲$262.35 million (2008)
- Subsidiaries: Paper Magic Group, Inc, Berwick Offray, LLC, C.R. Gibson, LLC, The McCall Pattern Company, Inc., Simplicity Creative Corp.
- Website: www.cssindustries.com

CSS Industries, Inc., was founded in 1923, as City Stores Company. Its headquarters is at 1845 Walnut Street, Philadelphia, Pennsylvania, with showrooms in New York City, Memphis, Tennessee, Minneapolis, Minnesota, and Hong Kong. The company designs, manufactures, and distributes seasonal and everyday greeting cards and novelties.

== City Stores Company, 1923–1985 ==
City Stores was a holding company, incorporated in the state of Delaware, that owned directly or indirectly all or a substantial majority of the stocks of several department and specialty stores in six states. It eventually controlled 39 stores in 19 states. The stores were serviced by a New York resident buying corporation, City Stores Mercantile Company, Inc., a subsidiary wholly owned by City Stores. In the 1950s, City Stores merged with Specialty Stores Co becoming City Specialty Stores.

City Stores started in 1923 with the acquisition of three department stores: B. Lowenstein, Inc., of Memphis, Tennessee; Maison Blanche Co., of New Orleans, Louisiana; and Loveman, Joseph & Loeb, of Birmingham, Alabama. The following year City Stores purchased Kaufman-Straus Co. of Louisville, Kentucky. In 1928, the company acquired a majority interest in Lit Brothers of Philadelphia, Pennsylvania, later merging it into City Stores' operations in 1951. After going into receivership in 1931, City Stores Company could no longer meet its financial obligation to Bankers Securities Corporation (B.S.C.), the owner of Lit Brothers. Albert M. Greenfield was then appointed as chairman of the board, a position he would hold for over 20 years.

In 1944, City Stores acquired control of R.H. White, a Boston, Massachusetts, department store. In 1946, the company acquired Richards of Miami, Florida. City Stores purchased a majority interest in two New York based women's specialty clothing stores, Oppenheim, Collins & Co. in 1945 and Franklin Simon & Co. in 1949. The two companies were later merged as Franklin Simon & Co. The company expanded its holdings of department stores with the acquisition in 1948, of Wise, Smith & Co. of Hartford, Connecticut, and Lansburgh's of Washington, D.C., in 1951.

In 1961, City Stores acquired the W. & J. Sloane chain of 30 furniture stores in California, New York, Connecticut, New Jersey, and other states along the east coast. W. & J. Sloane purchased a 280,000-square-foot (26,000 m^{2}) building at a prime location on Fifth Avenue in New York City from Franklin Simon. In 1966, City Stores acquired Wolf & Dessauer Co. of Fort Wayne, Indiana, but sold the company in 1969, along with Kaufman-Straus to L. S. Ayres.

The 1970s brought the company a large decline in sales and the need to liquidate assets. The company discontinued operations at Lansburgh's in 1973, and Lit Brothers in 1977. After several years of low profits or net losses, City Stores filed for Chapter 11 bankruptcy in July 1979. Under the reorganization plan, City Stores closed 42 Franklin Simon & Co. stores, Hearns Department Store, and the eight Richards stores. In 1980, Loveman, Joseph & Loeb and R.H. White department stores closed and B. Lowenstein Bros. stores were consolidated with Maison Blanche.

City Stores was dismantled completely through the bankruptcy process after acquisition by Philadelphia Industries Inc. (PII). Jack Farber, president of PII, became chairman of City Stores and was elected CEO in February 1980. Farber closed or discontinued the remaining department store operations in 1982, and by 1985 liquidated the remaining assets of W. & J. Sloane.

== CSS Industries, Inc. 1985–present ==
CSS Industries was established by Farber in 1985, with a new name to reflect a diversified strategy. CSS completed its first acquisition in January 1985 with the purchase of Rapidforms, Inc. of Thorofare, New Jersey. designed and manufactured a variety of business forms. It was sold in December 1997. In 1986, CSS acquired Ellisco Co., a manufacturer of metal containers in standard and customized formats. Ellisco's manufacturing locations included sites in Pennsylvania, Maryland, Ohio, and West Virginia. CSS sold the subsidiary to U.S. Can in 1994..

CSS added gift wrap and related products to its line of businesses with the 1988 acquisition of Paper Magic Group. Paper Magic designed, manufactured, and distributed seasonal and everyday paper products for gift giving and holiday celebrations. The company also obtained licenses to produce certain products with imprints of cartoon characters, including Care Bears, Teenage Mutant Ninja Turtles, and Walt Disney characters. In 1991, Paper Magic acquired Spearhead Industries of Eden Prairie, Minnesota, a manufacturer of Halloween and Easter products. In 1995 Paper Magic acquired Cleo, Inc., a manufacturer of gift wrap and trim, primarily for the Christmas season, as well as Topstone Industries, Inc., a manufacturer of Halloween products and novelties, and Illusive Concepts, a manufacturer of latex masks, accessories and decorative displays.

In 1993, CSS acquired Berwick Industries, Inc., a ribbon and bow manufacturer and integrated it into Paper Magic. In March 2002, Berwick acquired business assets of C. M. Offray & Son, Inc. (a producer and supplier of narrow woven ribbon) and merged them into Berwick. In August 2008, Berwick Offray LLC acquired Hampshire Paper Corp., a manufacturer and supplier of waxed tissue, paper, foil and foil decorative packaging to the wholesale floral and horticultural industries.

In the mid-2000s, CSS was reorganized into three affiliates: Berwick Offray (the world's largest manufacturer and distributor of decorative ribbons and bows); Cleo (the premier provider of seasonal gift packaging products); and the Paper Magic Group (a manufacturer of a vast array of seasonal merchandise - ranging from greeting cards to Halloween costumes). The C. R. Gibson business was acquired on December 3, 2007, and in May 2008, it acquired iota, a designer, marketer and seller of stationery products, such as note cards, gift wrap and journals. CSS announced on May 25, 2011, that Cleo would be shut down as of December 31, 2011.

CSS acquired the McCall Pattern Company (parent of Butterick and Vogue Patterns) in December 2016, and then in November 2017 went on to acquire Simplicity Pattern.

In January 2020, CSS was acquired by the British company IG Design Group plc, via its American subsidiary, Design Group Americas Inc. for $88 million.

On June 5, 2025, IG Design Group Americas, Inc. was sold to Hilco Global for $1, who will also profit and receive 75% of all of the company's brands' sales. The company blamed rising U.S. tariffs as part of the decision. On July 3, 2025, IG Design Group Americas, Inc., filed for Chapter 11 bankruptcy protection with plans to wind down and sell its assets.
