= Isaac D. Levy =

Isaac D. Levy (died September 9, 1934) was a co-founder of Oppenheim Collins & Company, Inc., a ladies' skirt manufacturer and, later, department store in Manhattan. The store was founded before 1890 and was located on 34th Street W.

He was married to Rosetta Davis. His son, Robert D. Levy, served on the board and president of Oppenheim Collins.
