= Ridgeway Shopping Center =

Shopping mall in Stamford, Connecticut

Coordinates: 41.0678°N 73.5454°W

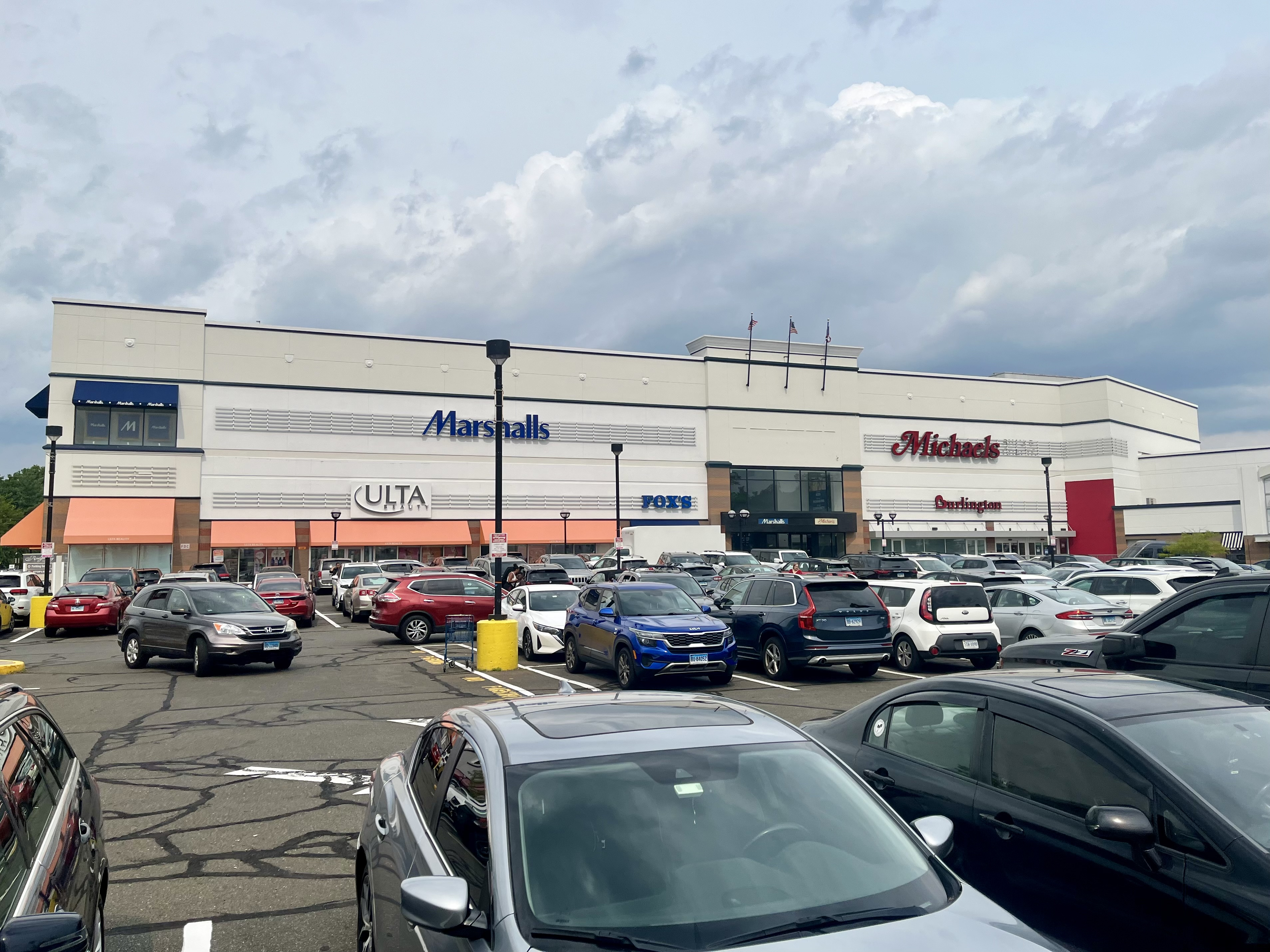
Ridgeway Shopping Center in 2026

Ridgeway Shopping Center is a 365,411 sq ft (33,947.8 m^{2}) shopping center in Stamford, Connecticut, now classifying as a power center but when first opened in 1947, the first department store-anchored suburban shopping center in the Eastern United States.

Stamford designer and architect Alfons Bach planned the initial section of the center in 1946, which opened on March 26, 1947, with 110,000 sq ft (10,000 m^{2}) of retail space on a 20,000-square-foot (1,900 m^{2}) parcel. Initial tenants included W.J. Sloan Home Furnishings (October 1948), Pennsylvania Drug (May 1949), Deena's, The Lurie Company, Chizzini and a Slenderella Figure Salon.

In 1951, Bach added a three-story office tower and a Sears department store. A movie theater was added the same year. A six-story office building was added in 1956.

In 1958, in a third expansion of the center, Gimbel Bros. opened a branch of Saks-34th, which briefly formed a small four-store chain, positioned as an upper-middle-market, yet more value-conscious sibling of Saks Fifth Avenue. Its addition to the center made Ridgeway the largest retail center in Connecticut. By 1960, when the center was sold for $5 million, it had 367,000 sq ft (34,100 m^{2}) of gross leasable area and parking for 1,000 cars.

When Gimbel Bros. closed the New York City Saks 34th Street flagship store in July 1965, the three Saks-34th branches including Stamford were converted to Gimbels branches.

In the mid-to-late 1990s, Ridgeway went through a massive refurbishment and expansion, with the ousting of Sears, Gimbels, and Grand Central Market, along other stores. In their place stood Stop & Shop, Bed Bath & Beyond, Staples, Michaels, Marshalls, Old Navy, Amazing Savings/Just-A-Buck, Dress Barn, and many other new tenants. Elevators and escalators by Montgomery KONE were installed through the mall and its six-story parking garage. The Professional Building was replaced with small business spaces, a loading dock, and new back hallways for employees. In 2003, a LA Fitness gymnasium moved into the space formerly occupied by the Ridgeway Theater. In 2007, a Modell's Sporting Goods opened in the former Amazing Savings/Just-A-Buck space. Eventually, as part of a corporate liquidation, this Modell's closed in 2020. In 2015, the former US Post Office next to LA Fitness became a Wells Fargo bank.

Anchors as of June 2023 were Burlington (taking over a portion of the space of the Bed Bath & Beyond that had closed earlier in 2023), Michaels, Marshalls, Old Navy, and a Stop & Shop supermarket.

Other tenants include Staples, Five Below, Carter's, Ideal Image, Snipes, AT&T, Starbucks, LA Fitness, BevMax, DSW Shoes, and other small businesses along Sixth Street on the site of the old Professional Building (demolished 1997-1998.)
