= Michael Flürscheim =

German economist (1844–1912)

Michael Flürscheim (27 January 1844 – 24 April 1912) was a German economist and Georgist who promoted an improved currency system, better known as the Commercial Exchange.

== Life ==
He was born in Frankfurt am Main on 27 January 1844 to a wealthy family. Flurscheim left school at the age of sixteen and entered the well-known banking and exchange house of his uncle, L. A. Hahn. He remained there for four years, and moved to Berlin in 1864, until he accepted a position in a stock-broking and exchange firm in Paris. He extended his experience of banking and exchange, and moved to the United States in 1867. In New York, he became familiar with the business of a wholesale manufacturer and importer.

In 1872, Flurscheim returned to his native city, and helped publish the "American News", issued for the benefit of Americans in Germany. In 1873, he purchased the Gaggenau Iron Works, then carried on in a small establishment, employing only forty men, and from that lowly stage he developed the business till it became one of the largest and most renowned hardware manufactories in the Grand Duchy of Baden, employing over 1000 hands. After disposing of this large and valuable business, Flurscheim travelled through England and France, and finally, on account of his wife's health, settled in Switzerland.

Leaving Switzerland in 1896, Flurscheim visited England, with a view to inducing the inhabitants to form an exchange currency of their own, and thus form the nucleus of a money reform in England. Having successfully planted the germ of the scheme he advocated, Flurscheim left for New Zealand, and arrived on 19 February 1898, at Wellington, where he immediately commenced his labours in connection with the Land Nationalisation and Currency Reforms. In both English and German, he authored "Rent, Interest, and Wages", "Money Island", and "Clue to the Economic Labyrinth".

Michael Flürscheim arrived in Wellington, New Zealand in 1898 and Auckland in 1900. He was a supporter of the single-tax movement and monetary reform. On arrival, he was greeted by the Single Tax Society and spoke at a meeting of the Socialist League and Trades Council. In October 1898, he established the New Zealand Commercial Exchange Co. Ltd., with offices at the corner of Willis and Manners Streets, Wellington. Those who joined the exchange agreed to carry out transactions without the use of money, a barter system using exchange notes. It was stated on the notes that "the holder of the note is entitled, on or within a reasonable time after presentation, to goods or services of the New Zealand Commercial Exchange Co Ltd, who are liable to supply goods or services". Flürscheim vigorously promoted the advantages of the scheme. He wrote many articles and letters to the press, published a pamphlet "Business without Gold" and launched a journal "The Commercial Exchange Gazette" later renamed the "Pioneer of Social Reform". He was convinced the exchange would flourish.

'There is nothing to prevent our club from gradually embracing all members of the community, and it is in the interests of every member to help extend the circle so as to have it embrace all trades, so that anything wanted by the members can be supplied in mutual exchange.' His efforts had the desired effect. Several hundred shopkeepers and trades people joined the exchange within a few months. Flurscheim left Wellington and established another exchange in Auckland, and by June 1901, it had enrolled a thousand local members. In 1902 he wrote 'Clue to the Economic Labyrinth" which he dedicated to the people of New Zealand. In this book he advocated land nationalisation, the abolition of interest and a co-operative exchange system. He also advocated the co-operative control of production and distribution.

Flurscheim left New Zealand in 1905. He went to California, where he formed a company to assemble railway tracks across California toward Mexico for William J. Palmer and the Denver and Rio Grande Western Railroad Company.

In 1910, he became ill due to an insolation in Coronado, California, so his wife Margaret Trommer, took the decision to return him and their three children back to Germany. He was sick and exhausted due to the solar radiation, and fell into depression by news of the sinking of the RMS Titanic. He died on 26 April 1912 due to a cardiac complication.

== Family ==
He had six children from two wives. His brother Hermann A. Flurscheim (1851–1914) became a New York City retailer. His son Bernhard Jacques Flurscheim was a chemist. His grandson Charles Flurscheim was an electrical engineer. His youngest son Michael Edward Flurscheim Tromer was a very important playwright and theater director in Mexico. His grandson Ricardo Miguel Flurscheim is a designer and manufacturer of medical equipment in Mexico.

== Literary works ==
- Auf friedlichem Wege, 1884
- Der einzige Rettungsweg, 1890

== See also ==
- Adolf Damaschke (1865–1935)
- Theodor Hertzka (1845–1924)
- Franz Oppenheimer (1864–1934)
