= Herman A. Flurscheim =

German-American businessman (1851–1914)

Herman Adolph Flurscheim
- Born: August 1, 1851; Free City of Frankfurt
- Died: August 18, 1914 (aged 63); Manhattan, New York City
- Occupation: Merchant
- Spouse: Bella Goldsmith (c1855-1910)
- Children: Mrs. Ansel Strauss; Mrs. Otto Loeb; Mrs. Harry Cowen; Bernard Flurscheim; Harry Flurscheim

Herman Adolph Flürscheim (August 1, 1851 – August 18, 1914) was a pioneer dry goods merchant and art collector. He was one of the first merchants to move to Fifth Avenue.

== Biography ==
He was born in the Free City of Frankfurt on August 1, 1851.

He came to the United States in 1875 or earlier. He had a brother, Michael Flürscheim. Herman worked for Stern Brothers until 1901 when he partnered with Franklin Simon in Franklin Simon & Co. Herman's children include: Harry D. Flurscheim; Estelle Flurscheim, who married Otto Loeb; Agnes E. Flurscheim, and Helen I. Flurscheim, who married Ansel Straus.

He died in Manhattan, New York City on August 18, 1914, and his estate was worth over $1M (approximately $32,143,000 today).
