= Naturism in France =

Lifestyle of living without clothing in France

Naturism has been active in France since 1920.

France has 150 member clubs offering holiday accommodations, 50 holiday centers, official naturist beaches, unofficial beaches, and many homes where naturist swimming and sunbathing is normal. Naturism employs more than 3000 people, and is estimated to be worth €250 million to the French economy. France is represented on the International Naturist Federation (INF) by the Fédération française de naturisme (FFN).

== History ==
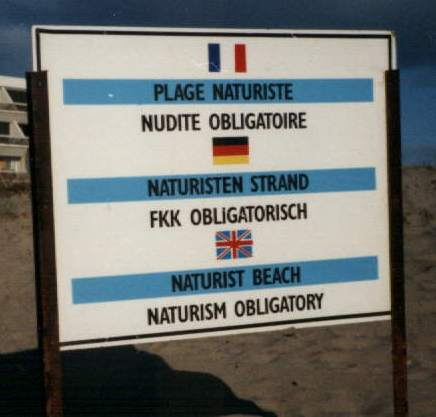
Sign on the beach at Cap d'Agde

In 1903 Spirus Gay created a naturist community at Bois-Fourgon. In 1907, supported by his superiors, Abbé Legrée encouraged the students at his catholic college to bathe nude on the rocky beaches near Marseille. A report on German naturism was published in la Revue des deux mondes.

Marcel Kienné de Mongeot, who came from a noble family and who was an aviator in the Great War, is credited with starting naturism in France in 1920. By then he was a journalist who wrote a defense of the dancer, Malkowski, in the journal Vouloir. His family had suffered from tuberculosis, and he saw naturism as a cure and a continuation of the traditions of the ancient Greeks. In 1926, he started the magazine Vivre intégralement (later called Vivre) and the first French naturist club, Sparta Club at Garambouville, near Evreux. Others quickly followed as did local opposition. His victory in court established that nudism was legal on private property that was fenced and screened.

Drs. André and Gaston Durville opened a naturist health centre, edited the La vie sage (1924) and bought a 70-hectare (170-acre) site on the Île du Levant on which they established the Héliopolis. The village was open to the public. Dr François Fougerat de David de Lastours, who was gassed in the Great War and was saved by exposure to the sun, in 1925 wrote a thesis on heliotherapy and in that year opened the Club gymnique de France. Jacques de Marquette wrote on naturism and vegetarianism. He founded the Trait d'Union which was described as a naturist society of human culture. In 1936, government minister Léo Lagrange recognised the naturist movement.

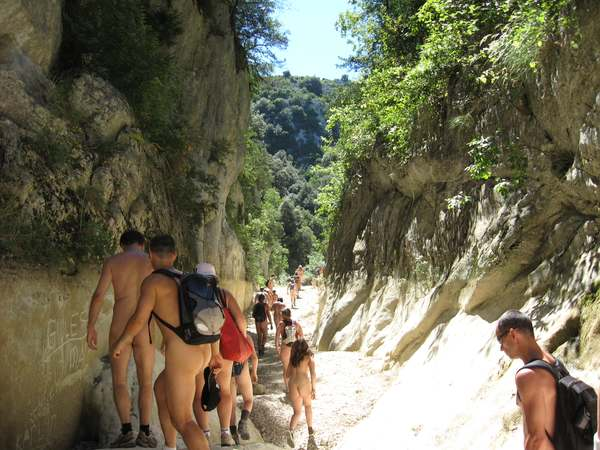
Randonue in Les Concluses, Gard, 2008

== Facilities ==
Albert and Christine Lecocq were active members of many of these clubs, but after disagreements left and in 1944 founded their own travel club Club du Soleil. It was popular and had members in 84 cities, becoming the world's largest naturist club. In 1948 they founded the FFN. In 1949 they started a magazine, Vie au Soleil and in 1950 they opened the CHM Montalivet at Montalivet, the world's first naturist holiday centre. In 1951 they assisted in the formation of the INF.

The Quartier Naturiste at Cap d'Agde opened offering a different form of social nudity. In 1975, Euronat, the largest holiday centre (335ha) opened 10 km north of Montalivet which was running at capacity. In 1983 the FFN was accepted as an official tourist and youth movement. SOCNAT provided the management and financial stability to the movement and runs 5 centres in France and one in Spain. Holiday centres started to form cooperative marketing groups and aim for 5 star status. Publicity material was of a quality indistinguishable from textile holiday companies.

In this benign climate, Randonue, an unauthorised form of naturisme sauvage has become popular, and areas traditionally known for discreet sunbathing have been revisited. Naturism is accepted and can even be practised on many popular textilist beaches.

As of 2007, France had 150 member clubs offering holiday accommodation, 50 holiday centers, official naturist beaches, unofficial beaches, and many homes where naturist swimming and sunbathing is normal. Naturism employs more than 3000 people, and is estimated to be worth €250 million to the French economy. France is represented on the INF by the FFN.

== See also ==
- APNEL
- List of social nudity places in Europe#France – list of social nudity places in France
