= Durville =

Durville is a surname. Notable people with the surname include:

- Hector Durville, French occultist
- Henri Durville, son of Hector Durville

== Fictional characters ==
- Luke Durville, a character in the New Zealand soap opera Shortland Street

== See also ==
- D'Urville (disambiguation)
- Jules Dumont d'Urville
