= Levant Island =

French island in the Mediterranean

Coordinates: 43°02′N 6°28′E

Native name: Île du Levant
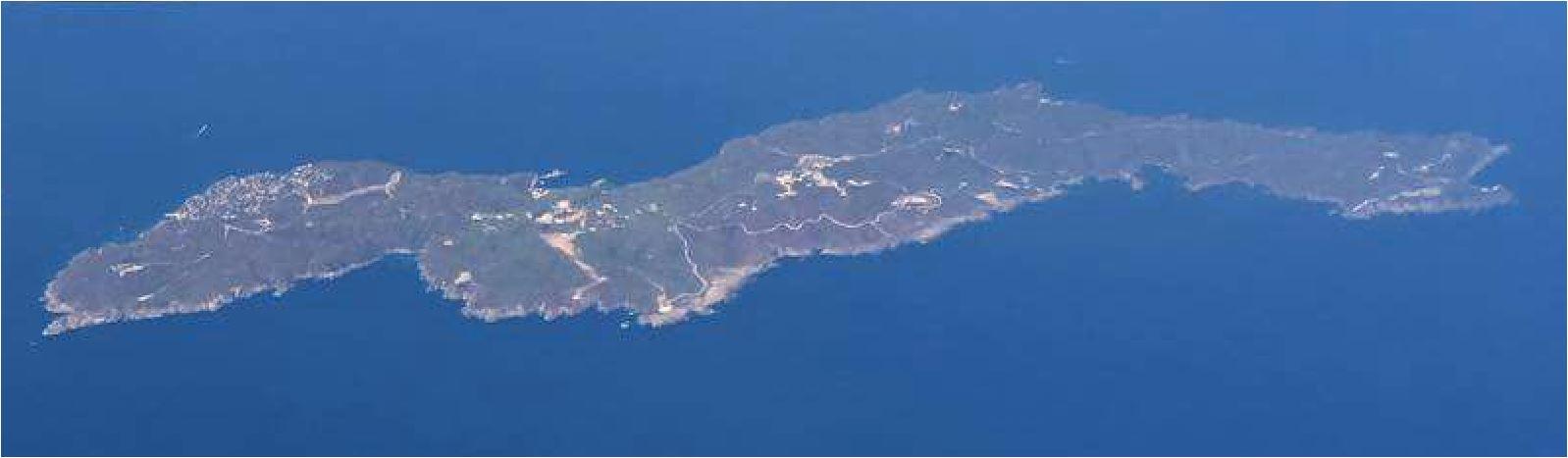
- Aeiral view of the island, seen from the southeast

Geography
- Location: Ligurian Sea
- Archipelago: Îles d'Hyères
- Area: 10 km^{2} (3.9 sq mi)
- Highest elevation: 138 m (453 ft)
- Highest point: Réserve des Arbousiers

Administration
- France
- Region: Provence-Alpes-Côte d'Azur
- Department: Var
- Commune: Hyères

Demographics
- Population: 87 (2018)
- Pop. density: 8,68/km^{2} (2248/sq mi)

Île du Levant (pronounced [il dy ləvɑ̃]), sometimes referred to as Le Levant, is a French island in the Mediterranean off the coast of the Riviera, near Toulon. It is one of the four that constitute the Îles d'Hyères. Part of the island is occupied by the naturist resort of Heliopolis and the rest is under military control.

== History ==
=== Ancient history ===
In the early Bronze Age the deposits at Petit Avis attest to the intermittent passage of man. Then in the Iron Age, in Liserot Cove, in the 7th century BC the occupation remains transient. It becomes permanent there only from the sixth to the fifth century BC. Then, after a long period of abandonment, it was inhabited again in the 1st century BC; Greek and Ligurian dishes were found on the island.

=== Modern history ===
Monks lived on the island beginning in the 15th century; the ruins of their monastery still exist on the island. From 1861 until 1878, the island was a penitentiary for young offenders and orphans, of whom 89 died here. A plaque (located on the military part of the island) commemorates them.

In 1931, Gaston and André Durville, both doctors, established Héliopolis, Europe's first naturist village, on the island. As the doctors Durville said in 1931

Heliopolis should not be a city or village, not an agglomeration of houses or luxury villas with garages, casinos, theaters, factories, business houses, but a simple rustic city where air and sunlight lovers come in the quiet of a beautiful nature, rest from the fatigue of artificial civilisation of cities, and enjoy simple and healthy holiday, with the only luxury of high ideals and the only concern for a more robust health.

== Geography ==
The island is 8 by 2 kilometres (5.0 by 1.2 mi), and located in the Gulf of Lion. About 90% of the island is reserved for a military missile test centre (the Centre d'Essais de Lancement de Missiles) which has launched numerous research and testing rockets since its establishment in 1948. The remaining 10% is open to civilians.

The village was built on hillsides and is dominated by Fort Napoleon. The village has a post office, a village hall, a chapel and a police station as well as a grocery, a bakery, and two galleries. The port area houses the office of the Capitaine du Port, a clothing store and small general store. In between there is a bazaar (Le Bazar d'Héliopolis) offering food, hardware, a tabac and a cafe bar. There are a number of hotels and bed-and-breakfasts, and eight restaurants (Le Gecko, La Fourmi, La Palmeraie, La Gambaro, Héliotel, Le Minimum, La Pomme d'Adam, La Bohème), all catering for naturists.

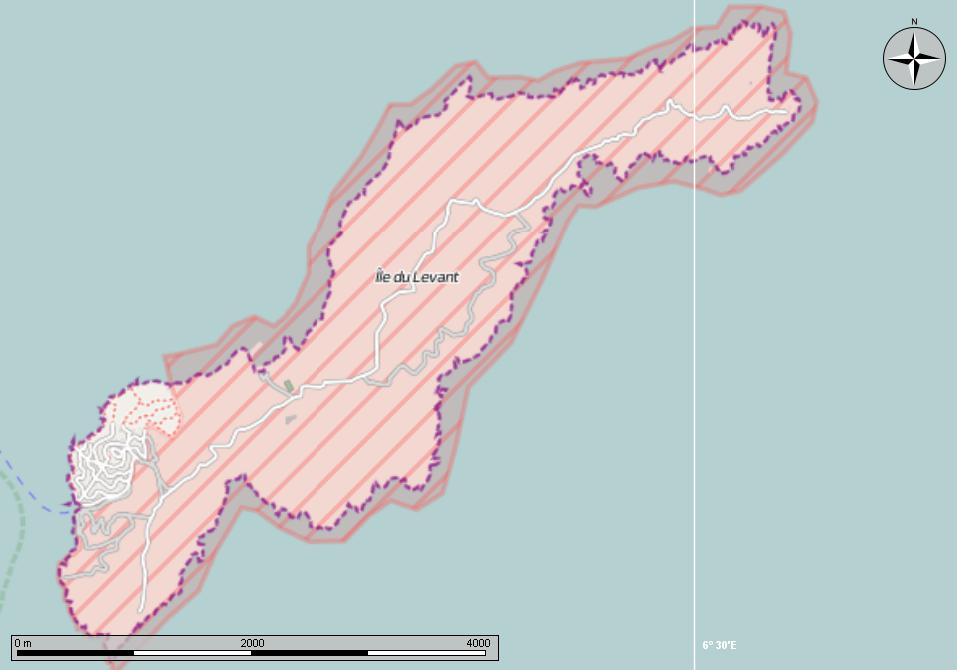
The military zone is shown in red on the map of the island.

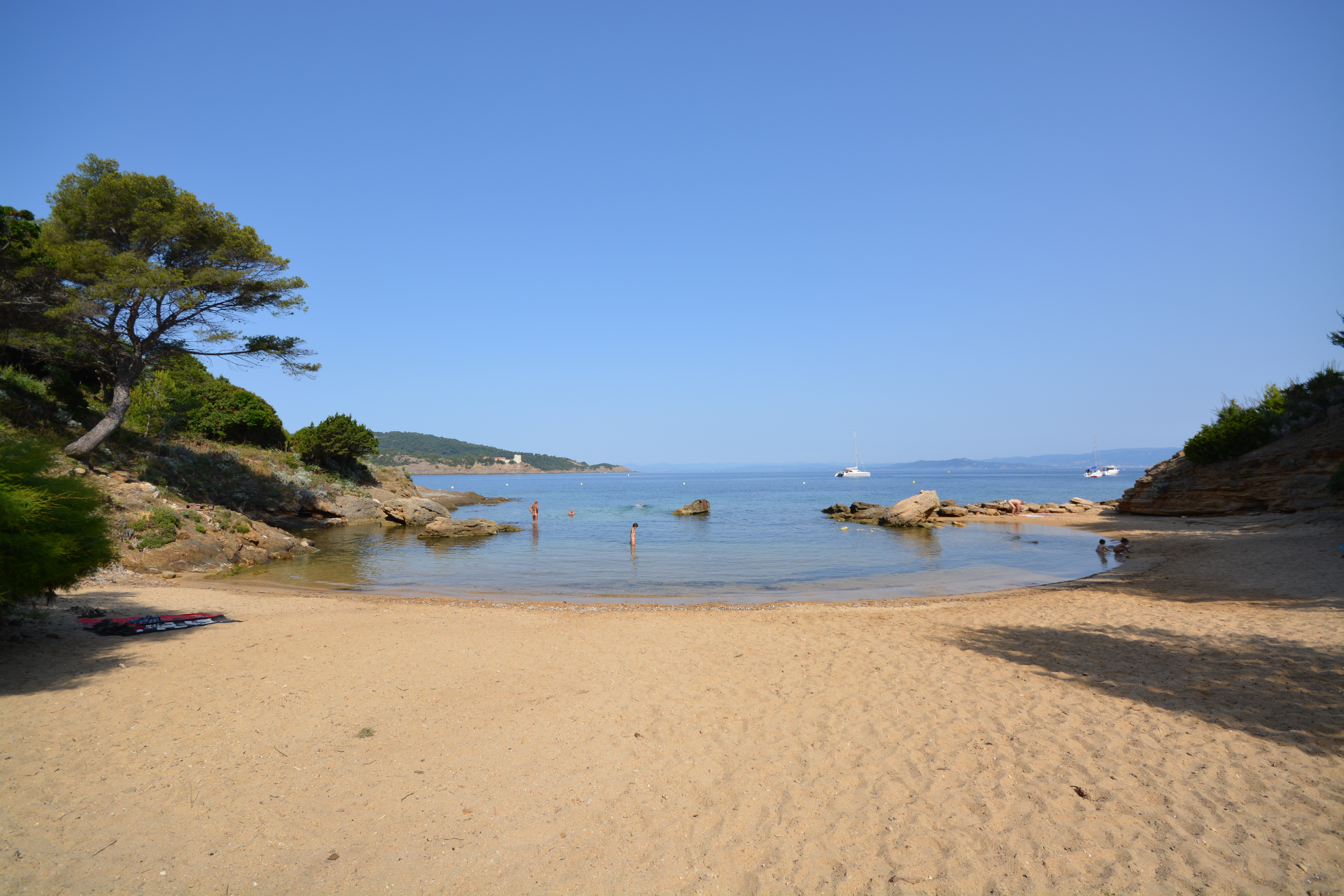
Plage des Grottes at Île du levant

=== Climate ===
Île du Levant has a hot-summer Mediterranean climate (Köppen climate classification Csa). The average annual temperature in Île du Levant is 16.5 °C (61.7 °F). The average annual rainfall is 621.5 mm (24.47 in) with November as the wettest month. The temperatures are highest on average in August, at around 24.5 °C (76.1 °F), and lowest in February, at around 10.2 °C (50.4 °F). The highest temperature ever recorded in Île du Levant was 38.3 °C (100.9 °F) on 7 August 2003; the coldest temperature ever recorded was −8.2 °C (17.2 °F) on 10 February 1986.

Climate data for Île du Levant (1991–2020 averages, extremes 1968–present)
Month	Jan	Feb	Mar	Apr	May	Jun	Jul	Aug	Sep	Oct	Nov	Dec	Year
Record high °C (°F)	20.7 (69.3)	22.3 (72.1)	23.3 (73.9)	25.1 (77.2)	30.5 (86.9)	35.8 (96.4)	35.6 (96.1)	38.3 (100.9)	31.2 (88.2)	27.0 (80.6)	23.1 (73.6)	20.0 (68.0)	38.3 (100.9)
Mean daily maximum °C (°F)	12.5 (54.5)	12.9 (55.2)	15.0 (59.0)	17.2 (63.0)	20.8 (69.4)	25.0 (77.0)	27.9 (82.2)	28.4 (83.1)	24.5 (76.1)	20.3 (68.5)	16.1 (61.0)	13.2 (55.8)	19.5 (67.1)
Daily mean °C (°F)	10.2 (50.4)	10.2 (50.4)	12.1 (53.8)	14.1 (57.4)	17.5 (63.5)	21.3 (70.3)	24.1 (75.4)	24.5 (76.1)	21.3 (70.3)	17.7 (63.9)	13.8 (56.8)	11.1 (52.0)	16.5 (61.7)
Mean daily minimum °C (°F)	8.0 (46.4)	7.5 (45.5)	9.2 (48.6)	10.9 (51.6)	14.2 (57.6)	17.7 (63.9)	20.2 (68.4)	20.7 (69.3)	18.0 (64.4)	15.2 (59.4)	11.5 (52.7)	9.0 (48.2)	13.5 (56.3)
Record low °C (°F)	−6.2 (20.8)	−8.2 (17.2)	0.8 (33.4)	2.9 (37.2)	7.0 (44.6)	10.0 (50.0)	13.3 (55.9)	12.7 (54.9)	9.9 (49.8)	4.6 (40.3)	1.1 (34.0)	−1.0 (30.2)	−8.2 (17.2)
Average precipitation mm (inches)	63.9 (2.52)	51.2 (2.02)	48.4 (1.91)	56.0 (2.20)	36.6 (1.44)	22.2 (0.87)	7.0 (0.28)	14.0 (0.55)	58.6 (2.31)	86.3 (3.40)	103.8 (4.09)	73.5 (2.89)	621.5 (24.47)
Average precipitation days (≥ 1.0 mm)	5.9	5.4	4.6	5.8	4.3	2.3	0.8	1.5	4.2	6.5	8.1	6.4	55.7
Mean monthly sunshine hours	147.5	163.4	—	245.0	289.8	339.6	366.9	—	268.4	189.3	142.6	—	—
Source: Meteo France

== Culture ==
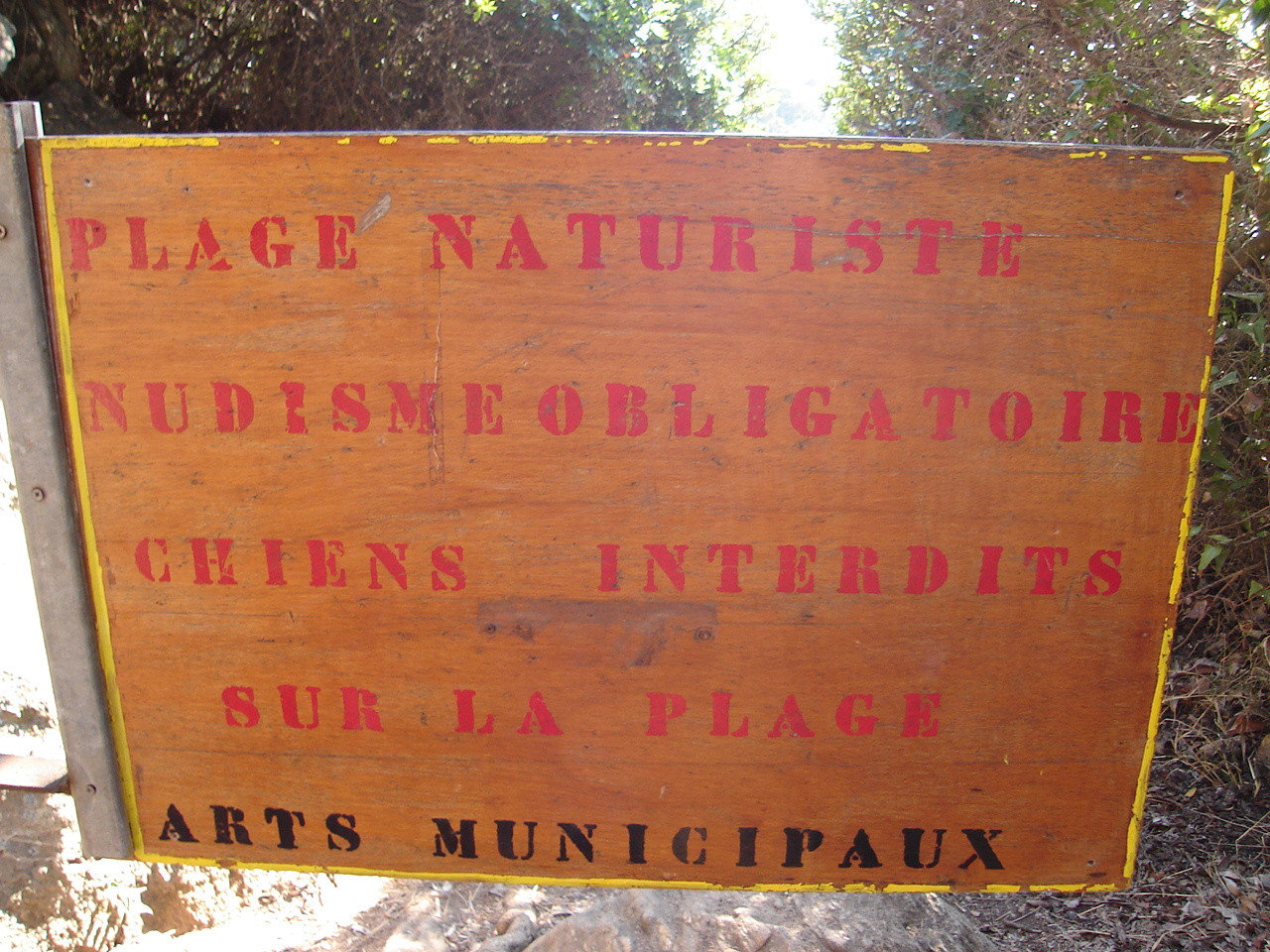
Sign at the trail to the beach

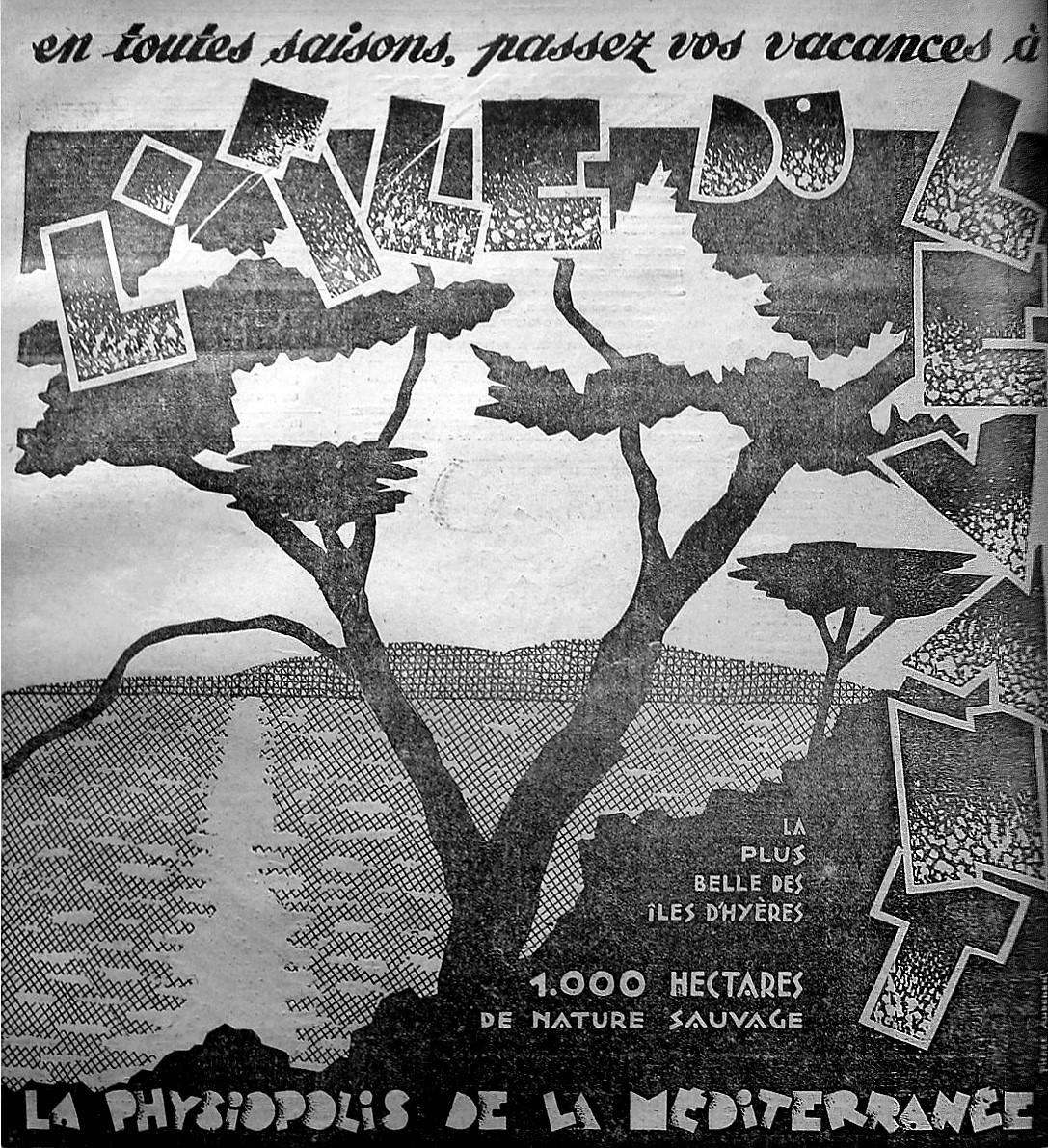
Illustration of an advertisement from the newspaper Naturisme Nudity place in English, 1931.

The Bain de Diane and the Plage des Grottes (a nude beach) are reserved for naturists; nudity is formally obligatory there. Being nude is allowed (and expected) everywhere on the public area of the island, except in the immediate vicinity of the harbour. In the harbour, it is formally necessary to wear what the French jokingly call French: le minimum, lit. 'The minimum', (Note: Le minimum is the term used by naturists on the island, for the tiny coverage required by regulations on a few locations. Near the harbour the genitals have to be covered. As a good-humoured protest against this regulation, some naturists wear in these locations a tiny string, a transparent pareo or a loincloth that fulfils the legal requirement but does little to preserve modesty.) often a pareo or a string. In conformance with the relaxed atmosphere of the island, this rule is not really enforced, but generally well observed. Inside restaurants outside the village centre, some clothing, although often flimsy, is often worn but toplessness (for women and men) is quite accepted there and le minimum considered sufficient attire; on the outside terraces, nudity is common, especially at lunchtime. At least two restaurants, La Fourmi and Heliotel, actively encourage customers to be nude, even at dinner.

The island sees a number of scuba divers; they generally do not take part in the nudist lifestyle.

The non-military part of the island is private property. The owners form the Association Syndicale Libre des Propriétaires à l'Île du Levant.

Outside Héliopolis naturist village the main tourist attraction is the Domaine des Arbousiers, a voluntary natural reserve of 19 hectares (47 acres), established on 3 December 1993.

The island can be reached by boat from Hyères and from Le Lavandou. As no cars are allowed on the island (except for some four utility cars), these ferries do not take cars.

== In popular culture ==
A 1956 film by Werner Kunz was called Isle of Levant and featured so-called "nudist camp" footage.

The island is used as a setting in the Robert A. Heinlein novel Glory Road and in the Mario Reading novel The Music Makers.

The island was mentioned in Are You Being Served? episode "Hoorah for the Holidays" as a presumed destination for Captain Peacock's annual vacation. Miss Brahms calls it "a nudist colony" but Captain Peacock insists it's a "nature camp".

The island, and a nod to its nudist history, was also featured in the French film Nos Futurs (Our Futures).

It was also the setting for a short story, The Reluctant Nudist, featuring Leslie Charteris' character The Saint. The Reluctant Nudist appeared in the collection published as The Saint Around the World

"The Incompleat Guide to the Île du Levant", Henry N. Manney III and Russell Brockbank (illustrator), Road & Track, March 1964.

== See also ==
- Cap d'Agde
- Euronat (naturist resort)
- CHM Montalivet
- Naturism in France
- List of French naturist beaches (In French)
- List of social nudity places in France, Europe
- Platais Island
- Naturism
- Wreck of Rochelongue
