= Gaston Durville =

French physician and naturism advocate

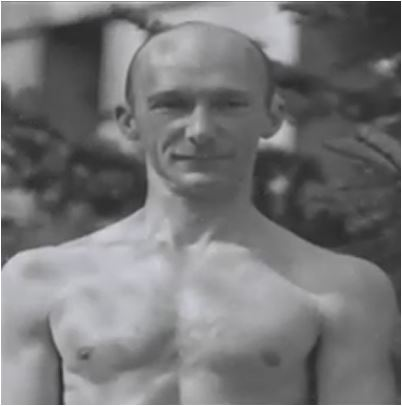
Gaston Durville

Gaston Durville (1887-1971) was a French physician who, with his brother, André Durville, was one of the initiators of naturism in France during the interwar period.

== Biography ==
In 1911 he graduated from Montpellier University as a physician, his thesis was entitled in French: Étude étiologique de l’hypnose, lit. 'A Study of the Etiology of Hypnosis'.

With his brother, André Durville he established the Naturist Society in 1927. In 1928 the brothers founded the Physiopolis naturist camp on Platais island in the Seine (Note: The Île du Platais is at 48°57′15″N 2°00′02″E) 27.6 kilometres (17.1 mi) from the centre of Paris. In 1930 they established the naturist village of Heliopolis on the Île du Levant, an island in the Mediterranean Sea.

During his medical training, he worked for a time at the hospice at Brévannes under the tutelage of Dr Paul Carton, where he gained his knowledge of natural treatments.

Gaston Durville joined the Vegetarian Society of France, and became well known for his vegetarian/naturist ideas. At the same time many vegetarians and naturopaths showed hostility to foreign breakfasts. The doctors Gaston and André Durville blamed the English breakfast consisting of bacon and eggs for being too high in protein: “The English breakfast with ham, bacon and eggs is nonsense even for a cold and wet country such as England and to a greater extent for France”

After World War I he published a voluminous treatise on naturist healing, La Cure naturiste followed by a series of 13 booklets on the naturist therapy and "psycho medicine". In 1923, together with his brother André, he launched the magazine La Vie Sage, monthly review of naturism and psychic education - which took the title Naturisme in 1930.

The two brothers then engaged in a long cooperation with the publication of books on therapeutic methods related to naturism. In the early 1920s they founded an institute for natural medicine in Cimarosa Street in the 16th arrondissement of Paris - which a few years later was renamed the Naturist Institute.

Durville's brother, Henri, besides his publishing activities, had partnered with a former disciple of Dr Paul Carton, Dr. Viard, to found a psycho-naturist Medicine Institute in Neuilly-sur-Seine. The combined influence of Carton's natural medicine and the "psychological medicine" of Hector and Henri Durville led the brothers, Gaston and André, to develop a "psycho-naturism" therapeutic method based on the combined use of physical agents, diet, massage, physical exercise, air baths, water and light, psychic agents, magnetism, hypnosis, mental suggestion and psychotherapy.

The brothers became convinced that the practice of medicine in specialized institutions was not sufficient ensure good health, and so they began to find news was to popularize the benefits of naturism.

Bauberot (2008) analysed the different ways how nudity became associated with a back-to-nature attitude and the ensued practices. At the end of the 19th century, naturist doctors advised nudity for the hygienic and therapeutic benefits from the air and sun exposure. Nevertheless, modesty codes had the effect of dissuading the French naturists from complete and collective nudity. After World War II, some naturist activists began working on democratizing the air and sun treatment. Gradually, they created a leisure naturism; the term will be associated with an outdoor activity, practiced nude. The practise of nudism remained partial for some of naturists, others advocated a complete naturism that led to nudism.

== Family ==
Gaston Durville was the son of the occultist, magnetist and hypnotist, Hector Durville, brother to André Durville and Henri Durville, André was also a doctor, Henri was a publisher. Gaston Durville had one son, Jacques born in 1918, also a physician.

== Works ==
- Les Maladies sexuelles, Paris, edited by Henri Durville, 1921.
- Les Maladies de la circulation, Paris, edited by Henri Durville, 1921.
- La Cure naturiste, Paris, edited by Henri Durville, 1921.
- L’Art de vivre longtemps.
- La Cuisine saine, with André Durville.
- L’Art d'être heureux, with André Durville.
- La Cure mentale, with André Durville.
- La Cure végétale, with André Durville.
