= French Vegetarian Society =

Former French vegetarian organization

- Sociéte Végétarienne de France
- Formation: 1882; 144 years ago
- Founder: Gustave Goyard
- Dissolved: 1942; 84 years ago
- Type: Vegetarian organization
- Purpose: Promoting vegetarianism in France
- Headquarters: Boulevard de Strasbourg
- Location: Paris, France
- Origins: Sociéte Végétarienne de Paris
- Region served: France
- Key people: Jules Grand (president; 1899–1933); Hélène Sosnowska (president; 1933–1942)

The French Vegetarian Society (Note: Also translated as the Vegetarian Society of France.) (French: Société végétarienne de France) was a vegetarian organization based in Paris, founded in 1882 by Gustave Goyard as a successor to the earlier Société végétarienne de Paris. Its purpose was to promote vegetarianism in France through publications, public lectures, and collaboration with other European vegetarian groups. The Society was reconstituted in 1899 under the presidency of Jules Grand, who helped expand its membership and activities. It produced several journals and pamphlets, including La réforme alimentaire and the Bulletin de la Société végétarienne de France, and counted physicians, academics, and social reformers among its members. After the death of its final president, Hélène Sosnowska, in 1942, the Society ceased operations.

== History ==
=== Origins (1880–1884) ===
In 1880, Abel Hureau de Villeneuve founded the Société végétarienne de Paris ("Vegetarian Society of Paris"), in Paris. The Society had its own journal, La reforme alimentaire ("Food Reform"), which was published monthly. The original Society merged into the Société végétarienne de France ("French Vegetarian Society") in 1882, which was organized by Gustave Goyard.

In 1883, a criticism of the French Vegetarian Society was that some of its medical members were not vegetarians and were prescribing meat to their patients. The Society dissolved in 1884 and became the Société pour la réforme alimentaire ("Society for Food Reform") which advocated an omnivorous diet.

=== Reformation and reconstitution (1885–1899) ===
In 1885, meetings in Paris were undertaken to form a new vegetarian society. Baron Emile Tanneguy de Wogan (1850–1906) was assigned presidency. Copies of his vegetarian pamphlet La vie à bon marché ("Life on the Cheap") were given to the working class.

There was no further reports of the society until 1899, when Jules Grand reconstituted the French Vegetarian Society with thirty initial members and became its new president. Membership consisted of doctors, industrial workers, lawyers and soldiers. Their members were dedicated vegetarians but associate members were also allowed to join. The offices were located at Boulevard de Strasbourg in Paris.

=== Early twentieth century (1900–1914) ===
During the early 20th century, physicians such as Fougerat de David de Lastours, Eugène Tardif, André Durville, Gaston Durville, and Albert Monteuuis were members of the Society. In 1906, it reported 800 members. By 1909, membership had risen to 1,175.

In 1901, the Society published Elisée Reclus's essay Le végétarisme ("On Vegetarianism") in La reforme alimentaire. The society collaborated with the Belgian Vegetarian Society on La réforme alimentaire, which was edited bu Ernest Nyssens of Brussels. The journal ceased publication in 1914. From 1916 to 1920, the Society issued the Bulletin de la Société végétarienne de France ("Bulletin of the Vegetarian Society of France").

=== Decline and successors (1912–1942) ===
A decline of the Society lead to new food reform groups emerging. Jacques de Marquette, a member of the Society formed his own vegetarian group in 1912 which became known as the Trait d'Union ("The Hyphen"), a naturist society. The Trait d'Union gained support in the 1920s and opened the first vegetarian restaurant in Paris. Paul Carton who had been a member of the Society since 1909 formed the Société naturiste française ("French Naturist Society") in 1921.

Following Jules Grand's death in 1933, Hélène Sosnowska became president. After her own death in 1942, the activities of the society came to an end.

== Legacy ==
Historian Ulrike Thoms has noted that "its membership actively sought to influence the population through the dissemination of magazines, tracts, pamphlets, and public lectures, so the society was more publicly present than the small official membership lists suggest."

== Selected publications ==
The Society published the following books:

- Ernest Nyssens, Du traitement alimentaire du diabète par le régime végétarien (1900)
- Jules Grand, La philosophie de l'alimentation (1901)
- Elisée Reclus, Le végétarisme (1901)
- Louis Pascault, Le régime végétarien considéré comme source d'énergie (1902)
- Carlotto Schulz, La table du végétarien (1903)
- Jules Lefèvre, Examen scientifique du végétarisme (1904)
- Henri Colliere, Végétarisme et longévité (1905)
- Hélène Sosnowska, Le végétarisme en thérapeutique (1912)

== See also ==
- List of vegetarian and vegan organizations
- Vegetarian Society
