= Hélène Sosnowska =

Polish-French gynaecologist (1864–1942)

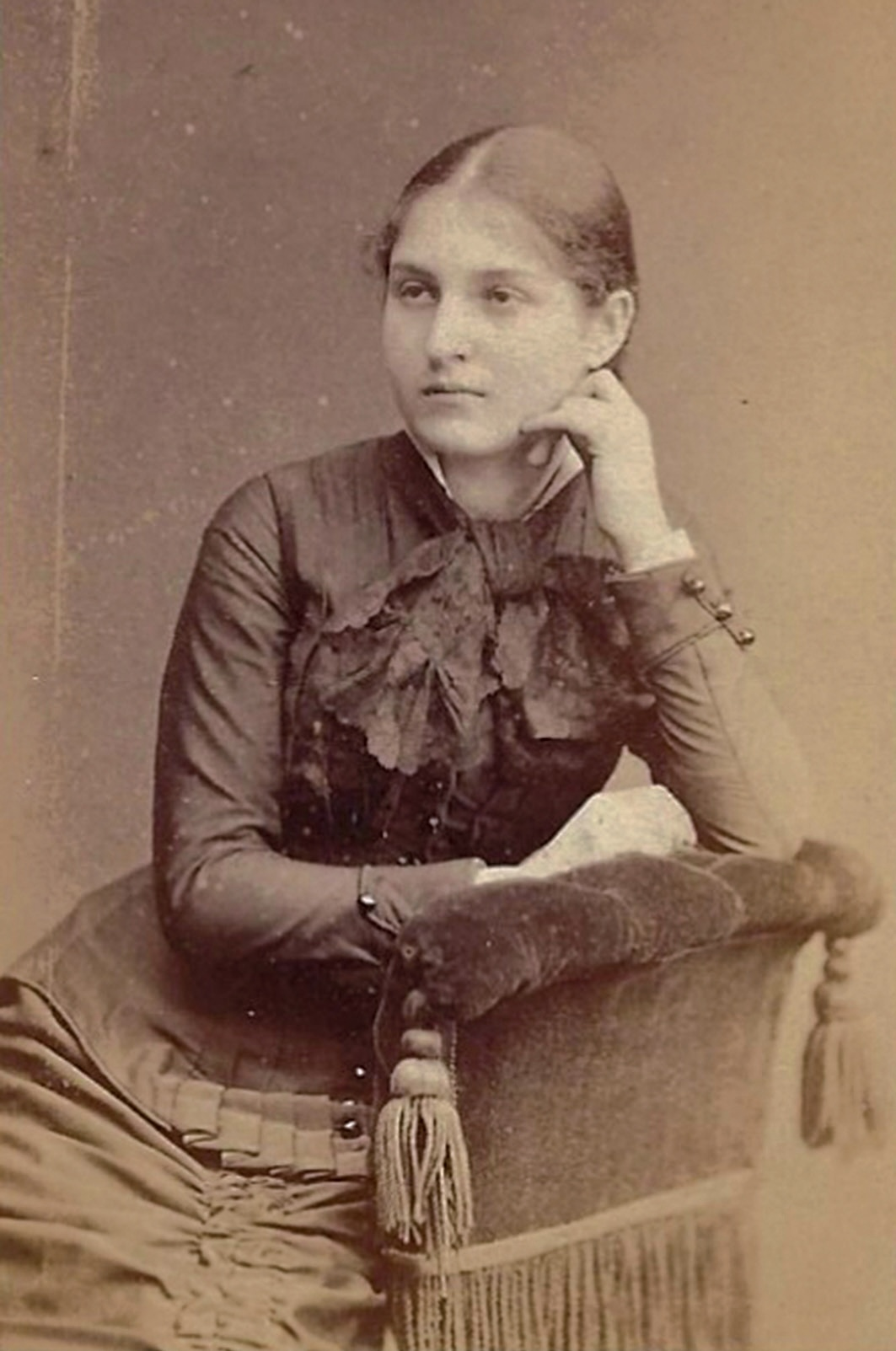
- Sosnowska by J. Kostka i Mulert
- Born: Helena Goldspiegel; 13 February 1864; Warsaw, Congress Poland
- Died: 31 January 1942 (aged 77); 8th arrondissement of Paris, German-occupied France
- Resting place: Père Lachaise Cemetery
- Other names: Hélène Goldspiegel; Hélène Goldspiegel-Sosnowska
- Education: University of Paris Faculty of Medicine
- Spouse: Casimir Martin Sosnowski (m. 1889)
- Children: 2
- Medical career
- Sub-specialties: Gynaecology

Hélène Sosnowska (born Helena Goldspiegel; 13 February 1864 – 31 January 1942), also known as Hélène Goldspiegel-Sosnowska, was a Polish-French gynaecologist, medical writer and social reformer. Born into a Jewish family in Warsaw, she settled in Paris and studied at the University of Paris Faculty of Medicine. In 1888 she defended a thesis on hysteria in children under the supervision of Jean-Martin Charcot, among the early medical doctorates awarded to women at the faculty. She established a gynaecological practice in Paris and wrote on the Thure-Brandt method, uterine disease, clinical techniques, vegetarianism and fasting.

Sosnowska took part in international medical congresses and worked in Paris hospitals during World War I. She also supported Polish medical trainees in Paris. She was active in temperance and vegetarian organisations, and belonged to the Society of Breastfeeding and the Society of Kinesitherapy. In the French Vegetarian Society she served on the committee from 1904, became vice-president in 1907 and president in 1933. She married the Polish engineer and socialist activist Casimir Martin Sosnowski, with whom she had two children, and was buried with him at Père Lachaise Cemetery in Paris.

== Biography ==
=== Early life and education ===
Sosnowska was born Helena Goldspiegel into a wealthy Jewish family in Warsaw, Congress Poland on 13 February 1864. (Note: Some secondary sources give Sosnowska's birth date as 15 February 1865. However, primary sources, including her university and marriage records, give her birth date as 13 February 1864. Additionally, her death record in the Paris archives lists her birth date as 13 February 1864 and death date as 31 January 1942. This would make her 77 at death, matching the age given in the Sejm-Wielki Genealogical database.) Her parents were Hermann Goldspiegel and Natalie Berman.

After graduating with a gold medal from a high school in Warsaw, she moved to Paris at the end of 1881 to study medicine. There she met Casimir Martin Sosnowski, who assisted her in chemistry, physics and mathematics. Sharing his social interests, she joined the newly established Society of Mutual Aid for Workers.

Sosnowska studied at the University of Paris Faculty of Medicine, obtained a baccalaureate equivalency in 1882 and enrolled 16 times between 1882 and 1887. In 1887, she worked with Jean-Martin Charcot at the Pitié-Salpêtrière Hospital. On 31 October 1888 she was awarded her doctoral degree after defending her thesis on hysteria in children at the Faculty of Medicine under Charcot's supervision. It was one of the first medical theses defended by a woman at the faculty. She spent the following year in Stockholm with Major Thure Brandt.

=== Medical career ===
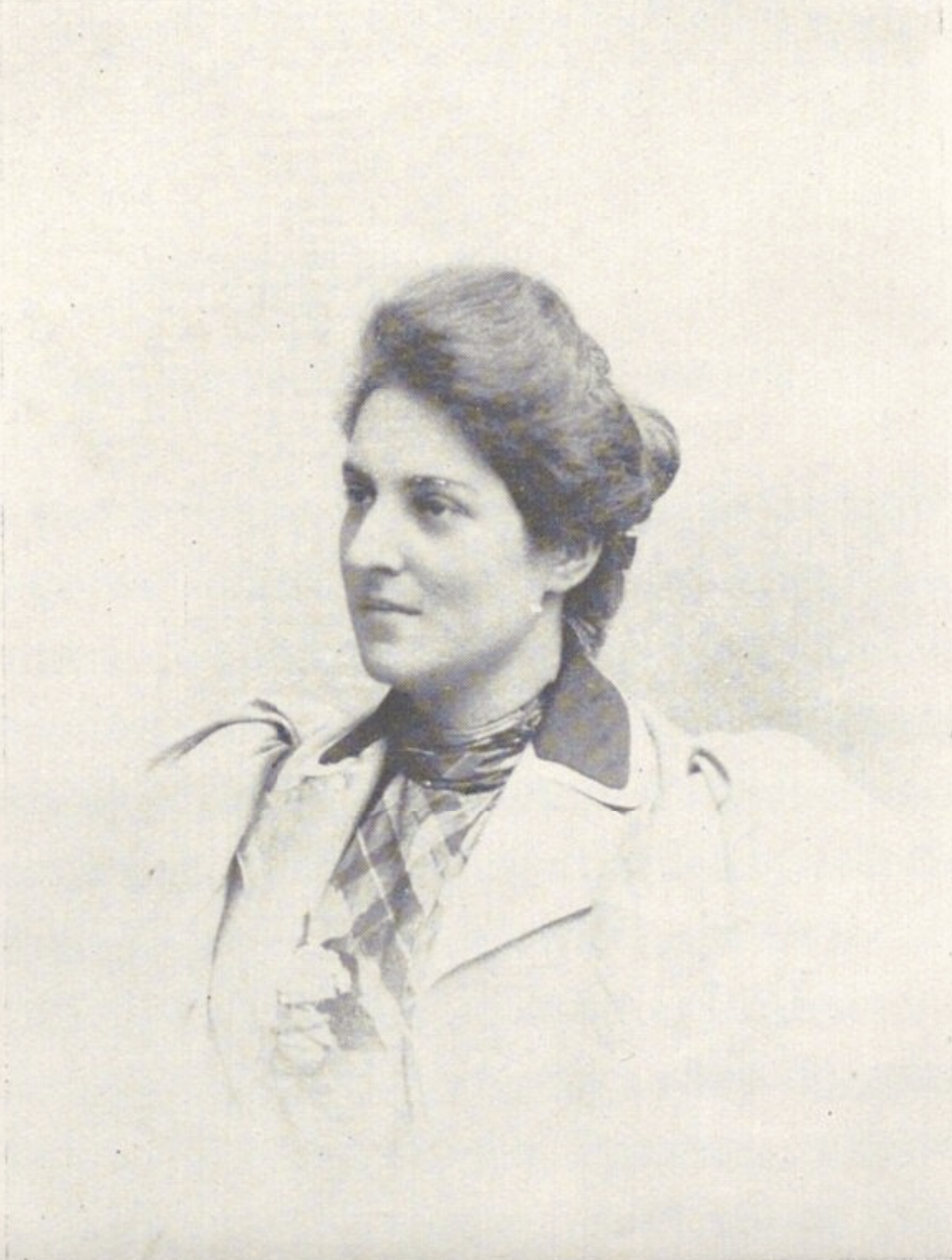
Sosnowska, c. 1931

Sosnowska specialised in gynaecology. She established a medical practice in Paris and became associated with the Thure-Brandt method, which used gymnastics and gynaecological massage to treat chronic gynaecological disease and infertility. She also studied the effects of vegetarianism and fasting on the body, and began publishing in professional journals in 1889. After her marriage, she published under the name Goldspiegel-Sosnowska, and later as Sosnowska.

Sosnowska wrote a number of medical texts on gynaecology, including works on uterine disorders. In 1893, she published Traitement des maladies des femmes par la méthode de Thure Brandt ("Treatment of women's diseases by the Thure Brandt method"). At the 1902 International Congress of Gynecology and Obstetrics in Rome, she presented "Quelques cas de stérilité guéris par le traitement de Brandt" ("Some cases of sterility cured by Brandt's treatment"). She also attended medical congresses in London and Paris.

During World War I, Sosnowska cared for wounded patients in Paris hospitals. She helped Polish students who, after completing their medical studies in Paris, took up hospital work there. After the war, she published a paper entitled "Les Hémorragies utérines soignées par la méthode de Thure-Brandt" ("Uterine haemorrhages treated by the Thure-Brandt method"), delivered on 19 February 1934 at the French Society of Gynecology.

Sosnowska also wrote about household nutrition and childcare and contributed to the Society of Breastfeeding. She was a founding member of the Society of Kinesitherapy.

=== Temperance and vegetarianism ===
Sosnowska campaigned for temperance and vegetarianism, with an emphasis on practical dietary guidance. In 1897, she contributed an article titled "Autointoxication par défaut d'assimilation et d'élimination; phénomènes neurasthéniques et arthritiques; guérison par le régime végétarien absolu, suivi pendant 16 mois" ("Self-intoxication due to lack of assimilation and elimination; neurasthenic and arthritic phenomena; cure by absolute vegetarian diet, followed for 16 months") to Revue théorique et pratique des maladies de la nutrition.

In 1904, she joined the committee of the French Vegetarian Society and became its vice-president in 1907. The Society published several of her works, including Comment on doit nourrir les enfants ("How should children be fed?"; Paris, 1906), Le Jeûne ("Fasting"; Paris, before 1912), and Le végétarisme en thérapeutique ("Vegetarianism in therapy"), which she presented in Paris on 4 December 1912 and was published after 1912.

Sosnowska attended the International Vegetarian Union 1926 Congress in London, where she stated:

[The vegetarianism] movement was not the result of the clash of material forces, but was part of an intelligent evolutionary process. They had to recognise the close relation that existed between the physical, the emotional and the intellectual kingdoms, and that vegetarianism would not only help to quicken the intellect, but would also help them to transmute their egoism into altruism.

After the death of the former president, Jules Grand, in 1933, she became president of the Society.

=== Personal life and death ===
Sosnowska married Casimir Martin Sosnowski (Polish: Kazimierz Marcin Sosnowski; 1857–1942) on 21 August 1890 in the 8th arrondissement of Paris. He was a Polish engineer, socialist activist and technologist involved in the early Polish socialist movement and later in steam turbine technology in France. They had two children, a son and a daughter.

Sosnowska died at her home in the 8th arrondissement of Paris on 31 January 1942, aged 77. Her funeral was held at the Saint-Pierre-de-Chaillot church. She was buried alongside her husband at the Père Lachaise Cemetery. Her death brought an end to the activities of the French Vegetarian Society.

== Selected publications ==
- Contribution à l'étude de l'hystérie chez l'enfants. Paris: Thesis. 1889.
- Du traitement manuel des maladies des femmes selon la méthode de Thure Brandt. 1889.
- Traitement des maladies des femmes par la méthode de Thure Brandt (observations personnelles de 1889 à 1893). 1893.
- Comment on doit nourrir les enfants. 1906.
- Le végétarisme en thérapeutique. 1912.
- Traitement non sanglant des rétro-déviations utérines, indications et contre-indications au traitement de Brandt. 1916.
- Thérapeutique gynécologique. Indications et technique de la méthode de Brandt: Contribution personnelle. 1922.
- Traitement de Thure-Brandt au point de vue analgésique. 1933.
- Les hémorragies utérines soignées par la méthode de Thure-Brandt (gymnastique décongestionnante et massage vibratoire). 1934.
