= D'Urville =

D'Urville or d'Urville is a French family name, notably that of explorer Jules Dumont d'Urville (1790 – 1842) who gave his name to many places and objects, especially in Antarctica and New Zealand. It may also refer to:

== People ==
- D'Urville Martin (1939 – 1984), American actor and director in film and television

== Places ==
Antarctica

- D'Urville Island, Antarctica
- D'Urville Monument
- D'Urville Sea
- D'Urville Wall
- Dumont d'Urville Station
- Mount D'Urville, Antarctica

New Zealand

- D'Urville River
- D'Urville Island, New Zealand
- Mount D'Urville

== Other ==
- French aviso Dumont d'Urville, class of French naval ships

== See also ==
- Durvillaea, genus of brown algae known as bull kelp
- Durville (disambiguation)
