= CCBN =

CCBN can refer to

- British Naturism (formerly the Central Council for British Naturism)
- Corporate Communications Broadcast Network, sold to Thomson Reuters in 2004
