= BSBA =

BSBA may refer to:

- Bachelor of Science in Business Administration, academic degree
- British Sun Bathers Association, national federation of clubs
- British Sovereign Base Areas of Akrotiri and Dhekelia
