= André Durville =

French physician and naturism advocate

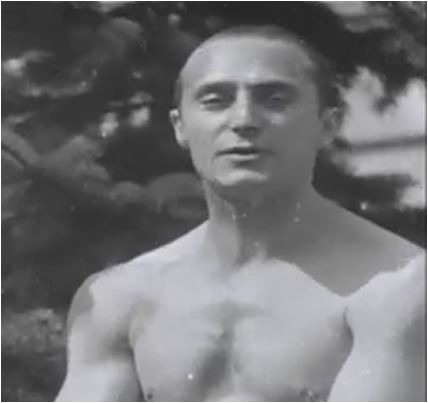
Andre Durville at Physiopolis

André Durville (1896-1979) was a French physician who, with his brother, Gaston Durville, was one of the initiators of naturism in France during the interwar period.

== Biography ==
André Durville is the son of Hector Durville occultist. In 1924 he graduated as a physician, his thesis was L'action de la pensée sur les phénomènes de nutrition cellulaire [The effect of thoughts on the cellular phenomena of nutrition] (Thesis) (in French). l'Institut de Médecine Naturelle. 1924..

André and his brother Gaston, influenced by Dr. Paul Carton, were advocates for natural, healthy diets. They developed this philosophy of natural diets and lifestyle to the advocacy of naturism.

With his brother, Gaston he established the Naturist Society in 1927. In 1928 the brothers founded the Physiopolis naturist camp on Platais island in the Seine (Note: The Île du Platais is at 48°57′15″N 2°00′02″E) 27.6 kilometres (17.1 mi) from the centre of Paris. In 1930 they established the naturist village of Heliopolis on the Île du Levant, an island in the Mediterranean Sea.(Harp 2011)

== Works ==
- La cuisine saine with Gaston Durville.
- L’art d'être heureux with Gaston Durville.
- La cure mentale with Gaston Durville.
- Translated The Kybalion from English to French fr:Le Kybalion
- Prentice Mulford's The Doctor Within. September 2010. ISBN 9781162817439. as Le Médecin en soi-même (in French). Translated by André Durville. Henri Durville. 1927.

== Notes and references ==
- Drouard, Alain (2012). "Reforming Diet at the End of the Nineteenth Century in Europe". In Peter Lummel; Professor Derek J Oddy; Professor Peter J Atkins (eds.). Food and the City in Europe since 1800. Ashgate Publishing, Ltd. ISBN 978-1-4094-8748-7.
- Harp, Stephen L. (2011). "Demanding Vacation au naturel: European Nudism and Postwar Municipal Development on the French Riviera". The Journal of Modern History. 83 (3): 513–543. doi:10.1086/660365. ISSN 0022-2801. JSTOR 10.1086/660365. S2CID 144401533.
