= Jules Lefèvre =

French biochemist and writer (1863–1944)

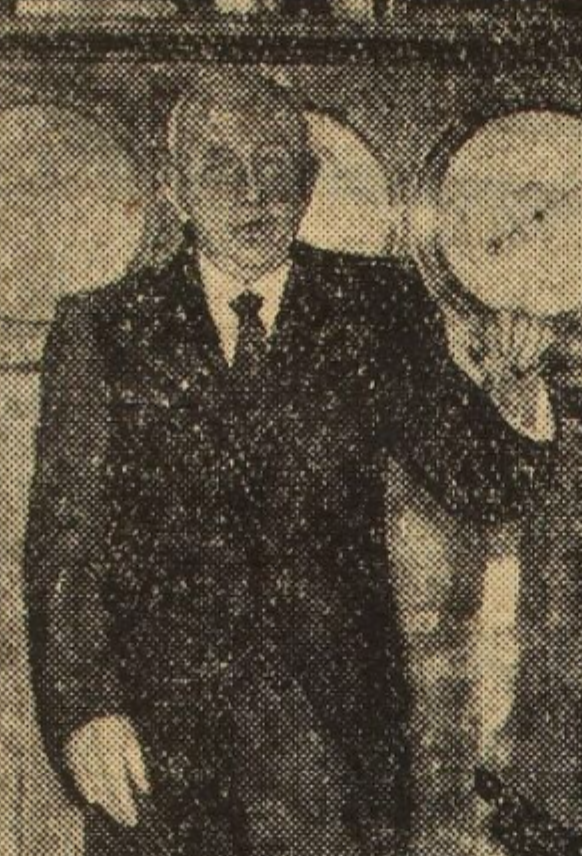
- Lefèvre in his laboratory, 1939
- Born: 1863; France
- Died: May 1944 (aged 80–81); France
- Education: École Normale Supérieure; Muséum national d'histoire naturelle
- Notable work: Examen scientifique du végétarisme (1904); Chaleur animale et bioénergétique (1911); Traité de Bioénergétique (1911)
- Awards: Laborde Prix (1894); Montyon Prix (1905); Petit-d'Ormoy (1913); Mallanet Prix (1913); Legion of Honour (1923); Grand Prix Albert de Monaco (1939)
- Scientific career
- Fields: Bioenergetics; thermoregulation; nutrition

Jules Lefèvre (1863 – May 1944) was a French biochemist and writer who worked on bioenergetics, thermoregulation, and nutrition. His publications included Chaleur animale et bioénergétique ("Animal Heat and Bioenergetics") and Traité de Bioénergétique ("Treatise on Bioenergetics"), both published in 1911. He also wrote on vegetarianism, including Examen scientifique du végétarisme ("A Scientific Investigation into Vegetarianism"), published in 1904 by the French Vegetarian Society. The book used the term végétalisme for a diet later described in English as veganism. Lefèvre received several awards for scientific work, including the Laborde Prix, the Montyon Prix, the Petit-d'Ormoy and Mallanet Prix, the Grand Prix Albert de Monaco, and the Legion of Honour.

== Education ==
Lefèvre studied at the École Normale Supérieure from 1884 to 1887 and at the National Museum of Natural History, France, from 1887 to 1888. During this period, he earned degrees in mathematics, physics, chemistry, and natural sciences between 1885 and 1887.

== Career ==
Lefèvre was appointed agrégé in natural sciences in 1888 and worked as professor of biology at the Lycée du Havre until 1928. He later taught biology in private institutions, including Stanislas and Sainte-Croix.

Between 1923 and 1927, Lefèvre designed and supervised the creation of a bioenergetics laboratory for studies of nutrition and metabolism in humans and animals. A 1932 notice described the laboratory as more flexible and precise than earlier calorimeter chambers, including those of Atwater and Benedict.

== Research ==
Lefèvre has been described by Christian de Rollepot as the "father of bioenergetics". His research on animal energetics began in 1893 and led to more than a hundred communications and forty papers. A 1932 notice stated that his 1911 Traité de Bioénergétique defined the science of the "animal machine", a term attributed to him. In 1929, he developed this work further in Volume VIII of his Traité de physiologie normale et pathologique ("Treatise on Normal and Pathological Physiology").

Lefèvre conducted research on human thermoregulation using calorimetric techniques. Building on earlier work by Bordier, he studied changes in the thermal conductivity of the skin in relation to ambient temperature. In 1901, he reported that heat loss at 5 °C, because of internal skin warming, could be two to three times greater than predicted by Newton's law. His 1911 publication Chaleur animale et bioénergétique included material on bioenergetics, body heat exchange, and metabolic heat production during rest and physical activity. Lefèvre also described ergometers and methods for direct and indirect calorimetry, and examined the effects of clothing and circadian temperature variation in night workers.

Lefèvre's work addressed thermoregulation, heat loss, and thermogenesis in mammals. A 1932 notice stated that he argued that heat production in organisms was both a byproduct of metabolism and a function in maintaining body temperature in homeothermic animals. The same account described his work on the relation between heat loss and ambient temperature, including the increase in heat production as environmental temperature decreases.

== Examen scientifique du végétarisme ==
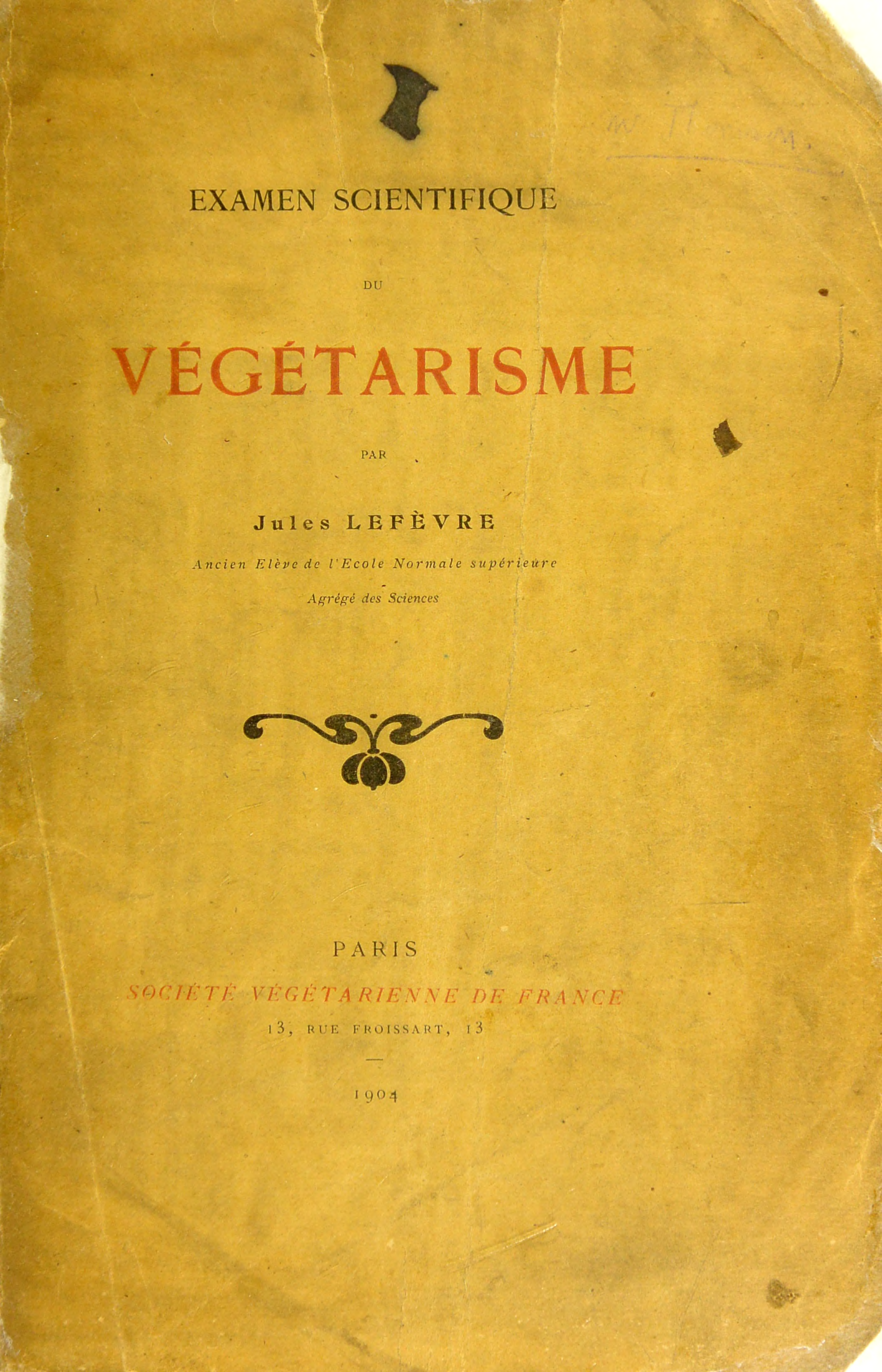
Examen scientifique du végétarisme, 1904

In 1904, Lefèvre published Examen scientifique du végétarisme through the French Vegetarian Society. He was elected to the society's management committee in 1905, along with Jules Grand. A revised edition of the book was published in 1919. An authorised English translation by Fred Rothwell was published in 1923 as A Scientific Investigation into Vegetarianism.

The book discusses vegetarianism from historical, physiological, and social perspectives. It gives a history of vegetarian movements and figures including Jean-Antoine Gleizes, then examines nutrition, food composition, and arguments about flesh-eating diets. It also discusses dietary systems including fruitarianism and végétalisme, and addresses illness, food systems, human energy, nutrition, and thermal regulation in relation to diet.

According to Ceri Crossley, Lefèvre argued that human anatomy, the health effects of meat consumption, and the relation between diet and energy supported vegetarianism. Lefèvre suggested that the nitrogen content of meat could affect intestinal health and contribute to kidney failure while providing limited energy. He regarded plant-based glucose, especially from fruit, as a more efficient energy source, particularly for athletes. Crossley also writes that Lefèvre connected vegetarianism with social questions, arguing that it could reduce class conflict, encourage rural living, and counter violence and social regression.

== Recognition ==
Lefèvre received the Laborde Prix in 1894, the Montyon Prix for experimental physiology in 1905, the Pourat Prix in 1908, and the Petit-d'Ormoy and Mallanet Prix in 1913. In 1923, he was designated to receive one of the three rosettes of the Legion of Honour. In 1939, he was awarded the Grand Prix Albert de Monaco, receiving 61 out of 63 votes.

== Personal life ==
Lefèvre was the father of Abbé Luc J. Lefèvre, who later founded the traditionalist journal La Pensée catholique.

== Publications ==
- Examen scientifique du végétarisme (Paris: French Vegetarian Society, 1904)
- Chaleur animale et bioénergétique ("Animal heat and bioenergetics"; Paris: Masson, 1911)
- Traité de Bioénergétique ("Treatise on Bioenergetics"; Paris: Masson, 1911)
- A Scientific Investigation into Vegetarianism at the Internet Archive (translated by Fred Rothwell; London: John Bale, Sons & Danielsson, 1923)
- Manuel critique de biologie ("Critical Manual of Biology"; Paris: Masson, 1938)
