= Jacques de Marquette =

French naturist and vegetarianism activist

- Born: Jacques Colin Frédéric Albert Demarquette; 23 April 1888; Paris
- Died: 22 August 1969 (aged 81); Paris
- Occupations: Naturist, writer

Jacques Colin Frédéric Albert Demarquette, best known as Jacques de Marquette (Note: Variants of the name include Jacques Demarquette) (23 April 1888 – 22 August 1969) was a French naturist, pacifist, theosophist and vegetarianism activist. He was the founder of Trait d'Union and a naturist camping ground in Choisel. In 1924, Demarquette established the first vegetarian restaurant in Paris.

== Biography ==
Demarquette was born in Paris and raised by Catholic parents. He discovered Hinduism and became a vegetarian at the age of 17. In 1909, he moved to America to undertake a doctorate in dental surgery. He became a member of the Theosophical Lodge of Philadelphia. Upton returning to France, he joined the French Vegetarian Society and founded the Vegetarian Action Group in 1912 which he used to promote naturism. The Vegetarian Action Group became known as the Trait d'Union. He was a stretcher bearer during World War I. He resigned from his Parisian dental practice after a few months, leaving for Soissons after being hired by the American Committee for Devastated France. He was contracted until 1922. He married Johanna Maria Goverdina IJzerman in October of that year.

He held a deep interest in mystical experiences. An ardent promoter of peace, he lectured in France and Germany on the principles of naturism and vegetarianism. He argued that they contributed to hygienic living and the progress of the "moral and spiritual values of which man is the bearer". He advocated the daily practice of meditation as a spiritual exercise. In the 1920s he reformed the Trait d'Union as a "naturist society of human culture". The society promoted ten "rules of integral naturism" for its followers. These included the abstinence of alcohol, tobacco, meat. Taking daily baths and showers and to get as much fresh air and sunshine as possible. Exercise including gymnastics was recommended every day as well as practicing contemplation and meditation. All of these were said to develop one's physical and spiritual qualities.

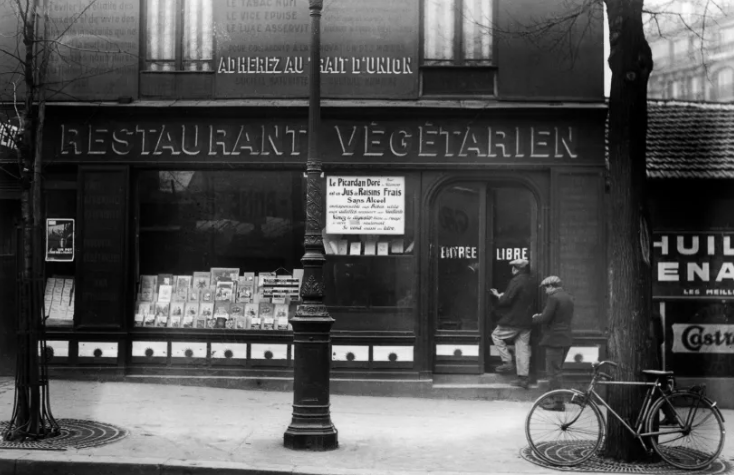
Trait d'Union's vegetarian restaurant in Paris, 1931

The Trait d'Union activists held a stand at the Paris fair and distributed leaflets supportive of naturism and vegetarianism. Demarquette acquired land in Choisel, near Chevreuse where they practiced naturist camping and sunbathing. In 1924, Demarquette organized lecture tours in popular universities and to other temperance and vegetarian societies. This proved successful and by 1929 the Trait d'Union had 16 provincial branches. In 1924, he established a vegetarian restaurant, bookshop and hostel with 60 beds that were mainly occupied by anarchists in Paris. A second restaurant named "Pythagore" opened in 1927 on Rue des Prêtres-Saint-Séverin. It served 350 meals a day. The society's membership grew with weekly conferences and events being hosted. Its official monthly magazine Régénération was first published in 1929. The magazine featured articles on naturopathy, naturism, spirituality and vegetarianism. It had an anti-smoking section.

When Demarquette returned to Paris in the 1932 he noted in his memoirs that cooperation amongst the society was in a poor condition as managers had hired other workers to do work whilst they were sunbathing. There were also allegations of stolen money. With debts to pay the society was reorganized and put back on track with help from Lucien Samson, an administrator. They opened a third restaurant in Paris called "Ahimsa".

Beginning in 1934, occultists and theosophists offered courses at the premises of the society. During this time, Demarquette called for the elevation of consciousness amongst members of the society. He had previously made arguments for vegetarianism based on hygiene and physiological arguments but now explored a spiritual element, leading to ascetism. Demarquette insisted on the need for a spiritual experience of an individual to seek the divine. He aimed to turn the Trait d'Union into a new religion of nature without success in 1934. He made a final attempt to spiritually renovate the society in 1936. However, by the late 1930s most of the society's members held interest in naturism and vegetarianism for health and hygienic reasons, not as an ascetic spiritual discipline. During this time Demarquette lectured widely on religion and spirituality.

In 1953, Demarquette founded the Association Végétarienne de France, a vegetarian organization in Paris. He was president of the organization from 1953 to his death in 1969. The Association had six presidents between 1971 and 1980, when it dissolved. Demarquette was a vice-president of the International Vegetarian Union.

== Mysticism ==
During the 1930s, Demarquette referred to himself as a Brahmin and was well read in the teachings of Upanishads. He authored Introduction to Comparative Mysticism in 1949. He defined mysticism as the "attempt to reach, while still alive in this world, a knowledge and experience of the next world promised by the teachings of religion and generally held to be experienced after death only".

== Selected publications ==
Books

- Le scoutisme, méthode d'éducation intégrale (1920)
- Introduction to Comparative Mysticism (1949)
- L'essence de l'hindouisme, dieux, cultes, yoga (1957)
- Lueurs psychophysiques sur les religions de l'esprit (1961)
- Religion in the Light of Sciences (1963)
- Confessions D'Un Mystique Contemporain (1966)
- Le Créativisme (1969)

Translations

- Le but de la théosophie (1913)

== See also ==
- Naturism in France
- Paul Carton
