= Abel Hureau de Villeneuve =

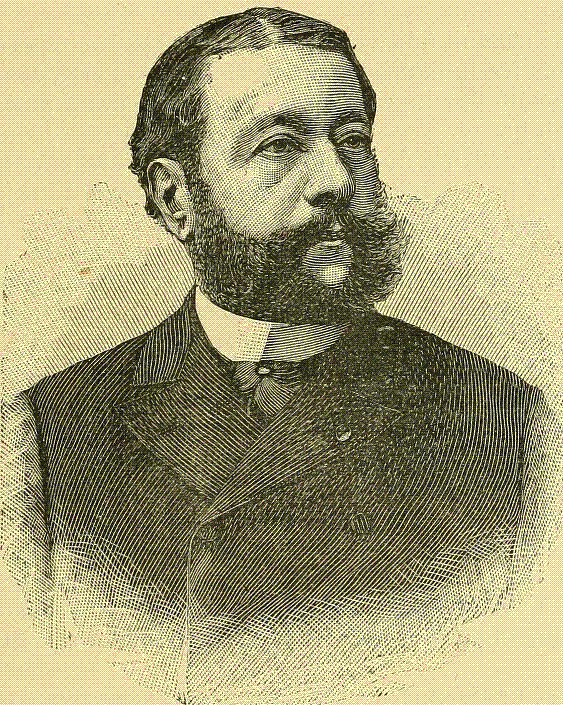
- Born: 1833
- Died: 2 June 1898 (aged 64–65)
- Citizenship: French
- Scientific career
- Fields: Aeronautics
- Workplaces: L'Aéronaute

Abel Hureau de Villeneuve (1833 – 2 June 1898) was an aeronautical experimenter, and ran a major French aeronautical society and journal in the late nineteenth century. He was also a vegetarianism activist.

== Aviation research ==
In the 1870s, Dr. Hureau de Villeneuve was the permanent secretary-general of the Aerial Navigation Society ("Société de Navigation Aérienne") and editor of its journal L'Aéronaute. He worked with aeronautical experimenters Alphonse Pénaud and Étienne-Jules Marey.

Hureau de Villeneuve had promoted the use of flapping wings ("ornithopter designs") with perhaps 300 experimental models for 25 years since the 1860s, according to Octave Chanute, who discussed an 1872 model in particular.

== Vegetarianism ==
In 1880, Hureau de Villeneuve founded the Vegetarian Society of Paris (Sociéte Végétarienne de Paris) and became its president. He became a vegetarian because he suffered from rheumatism. After some years of vegetarian dieting his health completely recovered.

Hureau de Villeneuve was a lacto-ovo vegetarian, he consumed dairy and eggs.

== Lexicography ==
His name is generally alphabetized under "Villeneuve, Abel Hureau de" but at other times it is written as if his last name were "de Villeneuve" or "Hureau de Villeneuve"
