= Euronat (naturist resort) =

Clothes-free resort in Grayan-et-l'Hôpital, France

- naturist holiday resort
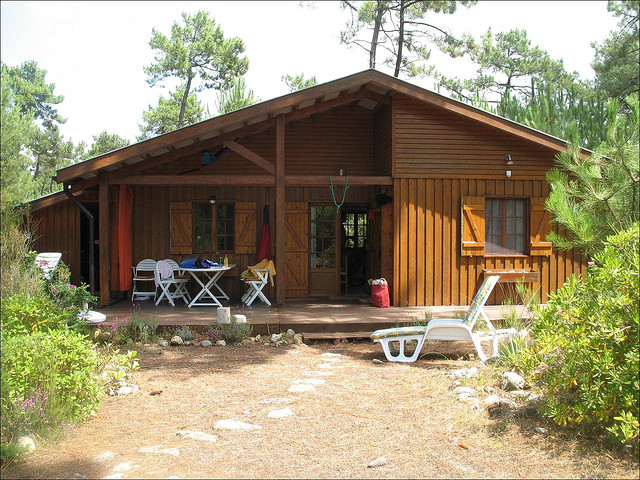
- A chalet at Euronat
- Interactive map of Euronat
- Coordinates: 45°24′59″N 1°07′48″W
- Country: France
- Region: Nouvelle-Aquitaine
- Commune: Grayan-et-l'Hôpital
- Opened: 1975

Area
  - Total: 3.35 km^{2} (1.29 sq mi)

Euronat is a naturist holiday resort near the CHM Montalivet naturist resort, in Grayan-et-l'Hôpital, France.

After the success of CHM Montalivet, it was apparent that there was a need for even more capacity. Euronat was founded by Hubert Lacroix (1931–1995) in a pine forest 1 kilometre (0.62 mi) away from the beach. This is reached on a boardwalk through protected dunes or by a roadway where there is parking near the beach. The whole area is naturist. Euronat opened in 1975. It is 335 hectares (830 acres) in area making it the largest naturist holiday centre in Europe. It is licensed for permanent residence.

Most of the area is taken up with chalets but 8.1 hectares (20 acres) are reserved for caravanning, and 30 hectares (74 acres) for camping. It also has two mobile home park sections. It has a covered indoor heated swimming pool, a new outdoor pool, an outdoor slide pool, a large conference hall, and boasts a Thalassotherapy centre. The center includes fitness classes and weight room; services include massage, mud baths, and seaweed treatments. Basketball courts and tennis courts are located near the camping area.

There are 25 shops in the shopping centre. These include a bakery, wine shop, a grocery store, a fish market, and a general merchandise shop. Among its cultural offerings, Euronat has had a strong connection with Francois Malkovsky (1889–1982), a proponent of 'free dance'. Also in the center is a pizzeria, seafood restaurant, French restaurant and ice cream stand. A few bars complete the center.

According to the center's bylaws, users must adopt total nudity in all parts of Euronat, including the shopping mall. The two supervised beaches are 1.5 kilometres (0.93 mi) in total and have two helicopter pads, for air ambulance use.
