= Ernest Nyssens =

Belgian homeopathic physician and writer

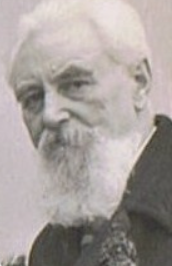
- Born: 10 July 1868; Chimay, Belgium
- Died: 14 March 1956 (aged 87); Saint-Josse-ten-Noode, Belgium
- Occupations: Homeopath, writer

Ernest Nyssens (10 July 1868 – 14 March 1956) was a Belgian homeopath, naturopath, theosophist and vegetarianism activist.

== Biography ==
Nyssens studied homeopathy in the United States which he introduced to Belgium. He was a naturopath who was interested in the ideas of Sebastian Kneipp. In the 1930s he was a bishop in the Free Catholic Church. Nyssens was a pioneer of the theosophical movement in Belgium. In 1897 with Elisabeth Carter, he created the first theosophical branch of Brussels. Between 1910 and 1915 he was active at a naturist and theosophical institute in Ter Nood, Overijse.

Nyssens was the director of a Theosophical educational community known as "Communauté Monada" at Uccle (1921–1938). The school issued vegetarian food, had a large public garden and the countryside nearby offered beautiful walks. Nyssens taught Swedish gymnastics. The school dissolved at the beginning of World War II.

In 1935, he married Berthe Deseck-Nyssens (1891–1981), secretary general of the Belgian Theosophical Society.

== Vegetarianism ==
Nyssens was a strict vegetarian. He founded the Belgian Vegetarian Society and edited its journal the La Reforme Alimentaire. Nyssens authored the book Du traitement alimentaire du diabete par le regime vegétarien (1901), it was published by the French Vegetarian Society.

Nyssens was a member of the International Vegetarian Union (IVU) Provisional Committee in 1909 and a speaker at the 1913 IVU Congress.

== Selected publications ==
- Du Traitement alimentaire du diabète (1900)
- La Cuisine rationnelle, précis d'hygiène alimentaire (1900)
