= Helen Berriman =

British naturist and media personality

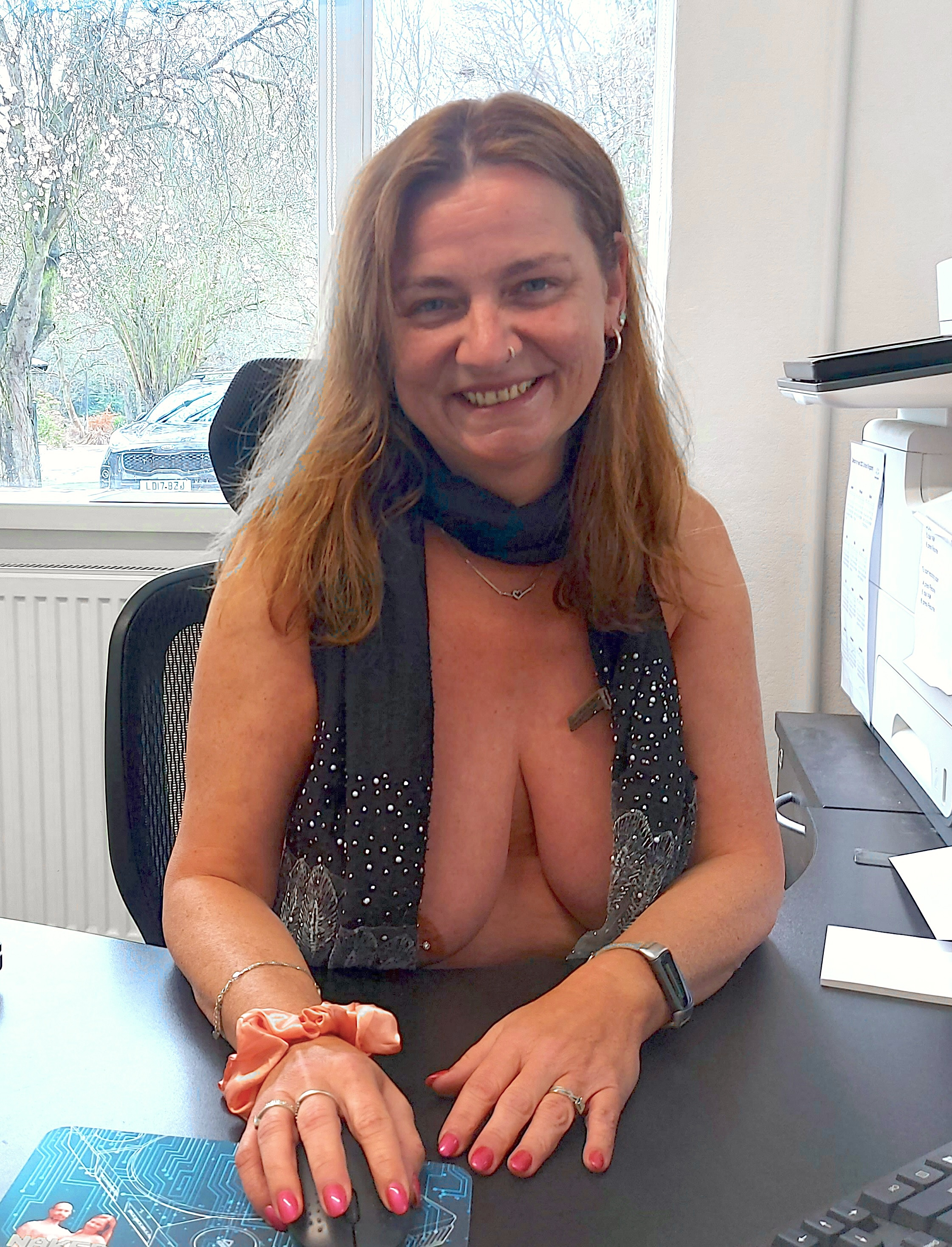
- Berriman at The Naturist Foundation, 2023
- Born: 13 August 1975 (age 51)
- Occupations: Naturist, Journalist and media personality
- Spouse: Simon Berriman (m. 2017)
- Children: 3

Helen Berriman (born 13 August 1975) is a British naturist currently living in Taunton, Somerset. She works for British Naturism and H&E naturist magazine. She is known for her podcast, Women in Focus, which proclaims to be "dedicated to celebrating and empowering women through naturism". She is also credited as appearing nude on a number of television and radio shows.

== Career ==
Berriman originally trained as an dispensing optician and progressed to retail manager before leaving the industry in March 2021. She first appeared publicly as a naturist in the media when she featured on the cover of H&E naturist in January 2021, which also covered her story as a new naturist. She joined British Naturism as their "Women in Naturism co-ordinator" in November 2021. She appeared in various TV and radio interviews, including making headlines by appearing fully nude on Good Morning Britain in May 2023.

She was promoted within British Naturism to Women's Executive Officer in October 2023, and the following month (November 2023) she launched the "Women in Focus" podcast, a monthly show which Berriman hosts and focuses on the stories of other naturist women and body acceptance.

She is a writer and journalist and has a regular column in H&E naturist magazine. Previously she also worked as a receptionist at The Naturist Foundation.

Together with her husband, Simon Berriman, she is also one half of the Naked Retro Gamers, where they publish short videos of themselves exploring older computer and console games while nude.

== Personal life ==
Berriman met her husband Simon in 2015 who was already a naturist. Initially it caused friction in their relationship when she would discover him naked around their house. During the COVID-19 pandemic she was furloughed from her retail manager job and got used to the idea of Simon being naked at home. Simon got her a bikini which was "a big deal" for her at the time, and after the lockdown lifted she attended a reverse life drawing class at a naturist venue and discovered that naturism was not what she thought it was.

== Controversy ==
Berriman made headlines in the UK media on 30 May 2023 when she appeared totally nude on ITV1's Good Morning Britain programme shortly before 8 am. She was taking part in a discussion on whether naked sunbathing should be made illegal. The news articles from the day cite Twitter users calling her appearance 'disgraceful' and 'ridiculous'.
