= D'Urville Monument =

Mountain of Antarctica

Coordinates: 63°25′S 56°18′W

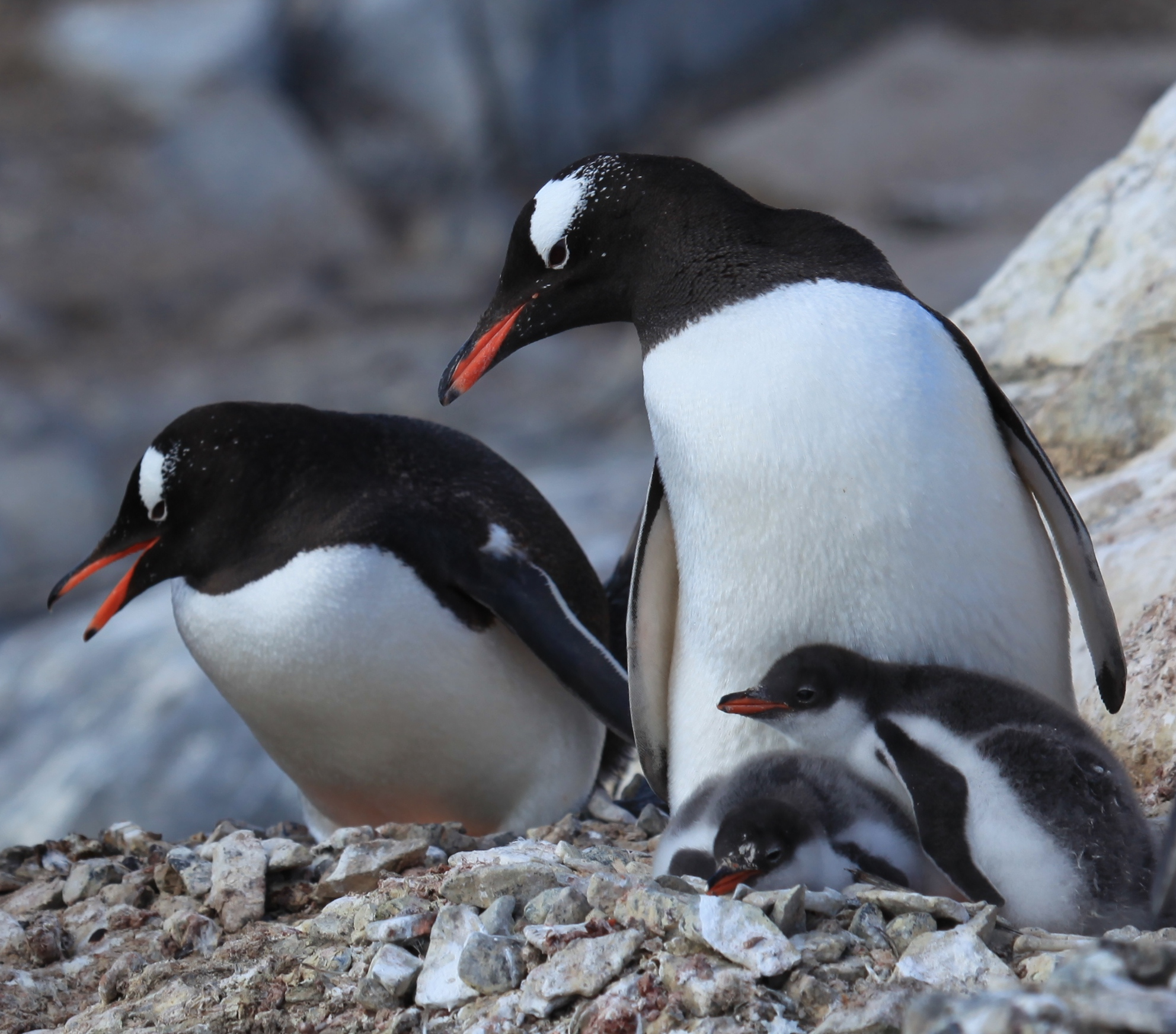
Gentoo penguins breed in the IBA

D'Urville Monument is a conspicuous conical summit, 575 m (1,886 ft) high, at the south-west end of Joinville Island, off the north-east end of the Antarctic Peninsula. It was discovered by a British expedition under James Clark Ross between 1839 and 1843. It was named by him for Captain Jules Dumont d'Urville.

== Important Bird Area ==
The site has been identified as an Important Bird Area (IBA) by BirdLife International because it supports a large breeding colony of about 10,000 pairs of Adélie penguins and over 670 pairs of gentoo penguins.
