= CHM Montalivet =

World's first naturist holiday resort located in France

Coordinates: 45°21′48″N 1°08′44″W

Entrance at CHM Monta

CHM Montalivet (CHM for "Centre Hélio-Marin", "center of sun and sea"), also known as CHM Monta, is the world's first naturist holiday resort, located south of Montalivet in Vendays-Montalivet, France. CHM Montalivet opened in 1950, and the International Naturist Federation (FNI/INF) was founded there in 1953.

== The centre ==
The centre is 175 hectares (430 acres) of land adjoining the beach to the south of Montalivet-les-Bains, in the commune of Vendays-Montalivet, in the Médoc, part of Aquitaine north of Bordeaux, France. It comprises about 1000 privately owned bungalows and caravans, 960 sites suitable for touring caravans and 260 camping sites. Over 12 kilometres (7.5 mi) of internal roads are laid out in an approximate grid formation. The pitch and bungalows are arranged into 20 villages, each having its own character. Families tend to return regularly, usually to the same village.

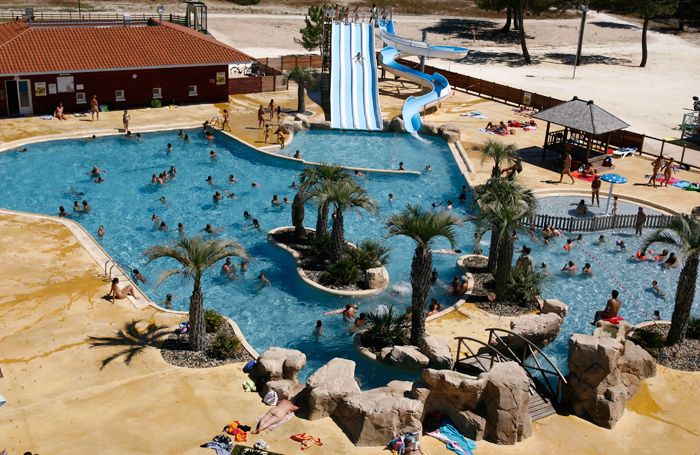
Water park with children's play area

Facilities include tennis, volleyball, football, basketball, archery, minigolf and pétanque, a craft village, a cultural centre with a multilingual library, an outdoor theatre that screens films, a shopping centre with 25 shops including two bakeries, a hairdresser, a wine shop, a bookshop, grocery stores, a fish market, a general merchandise shop, and restaurants. This is fronted by a 3-kilometre (1.9 mi) white sand beach with two supervised swimming points.

CHM Montalivet is family-oriented and the single guest is accepted only if presented by their client. Half of the visitors are non-French.

== History ==
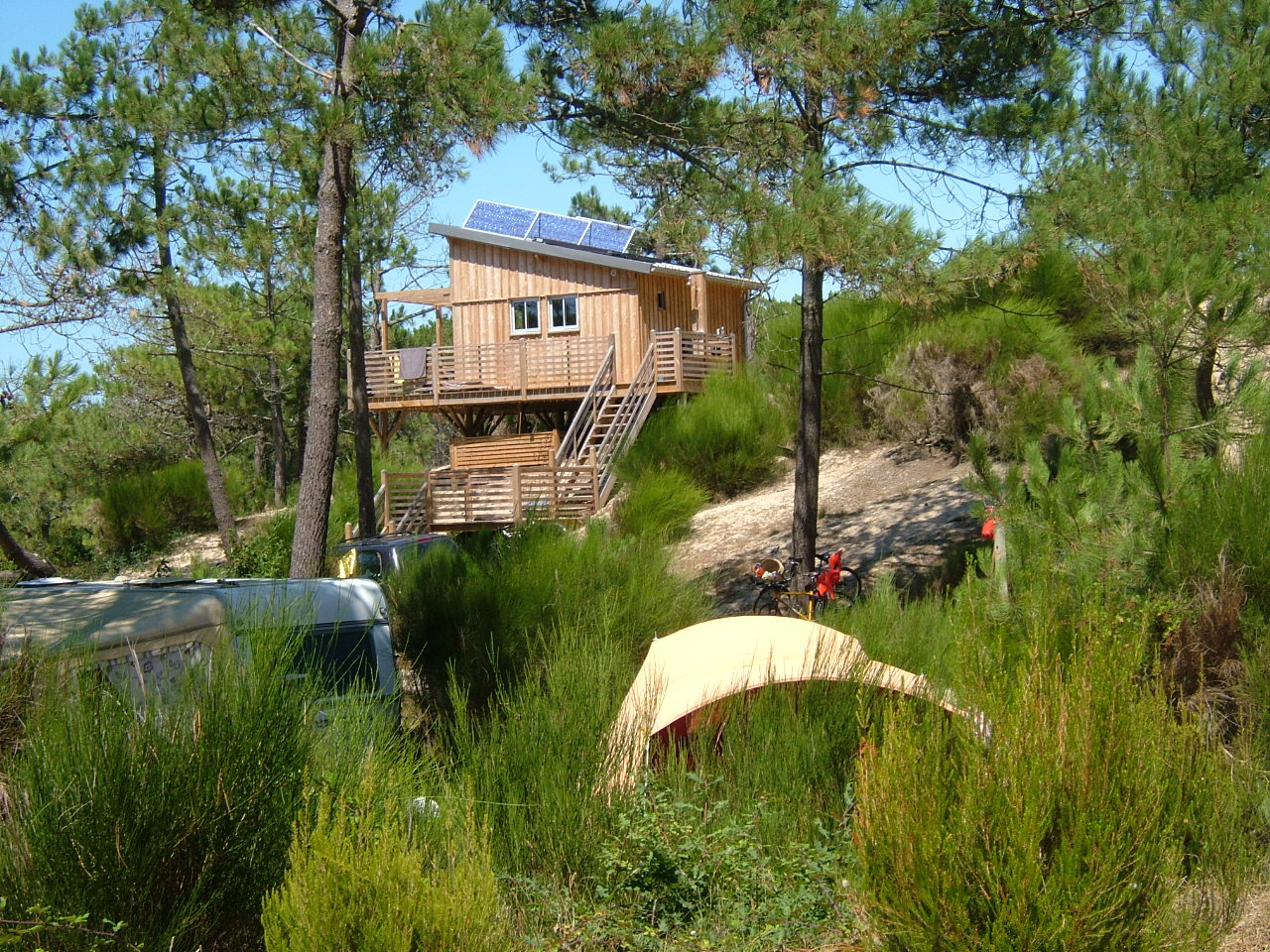
View across the district 'Ajoncs' in the ONF protected zone

Nude bathing has been practised on the Aquitaine coast from time immemorial. It was noted by Marcel Kienné de Mongeot in 1920 along the entire coast. Before the World War II, the locals bathed 'sans maillot', and during the war so did the occupying troops. Christiane and Albert Lecocq, from Arras who had been instrumental in setting up a region framework for urban naturist clubs, conceived the idea of combining naturism and travel made possible by paid annual leave, introduced in 1936 in France. He concluded that the 70 hectares on the Île du Levant near Toulon was too small, and through Robert Poulain was introduced to the mayor of Vendays-Montalivet who rented him 23.8 hectares (59 acres) of burnt forest that was zoned to become a 'Colonie de Vacances' or holiday resort. The deal was signed 23 July 1950. The legal structure was new. The lease was taken in the name of Albert Lecocq as if it were a suburban club, which would have to be non-profit making. It was to be a 'Centre de Vacances' and thus a separate legal entity that could make a profit and a commercial company SOCNAT was formed in 1954.

Christiane Lecocq recalled that: "On the terrain we found total desolation. Everything was black or burnt." They had the abandoned concrete from the war, five tents and a hut. There was no shade. We went back to the village to sleep on the floor in an open cabin". In 1951 they had purchased a car, and started removing the barbed wire and munitions. A small space was cleared. The first wooden bungalows were constructed in 1951. A further 25 hectares (62 acres) was leased under the name of the Féderation Français de Naturisme on 22 December 1951.

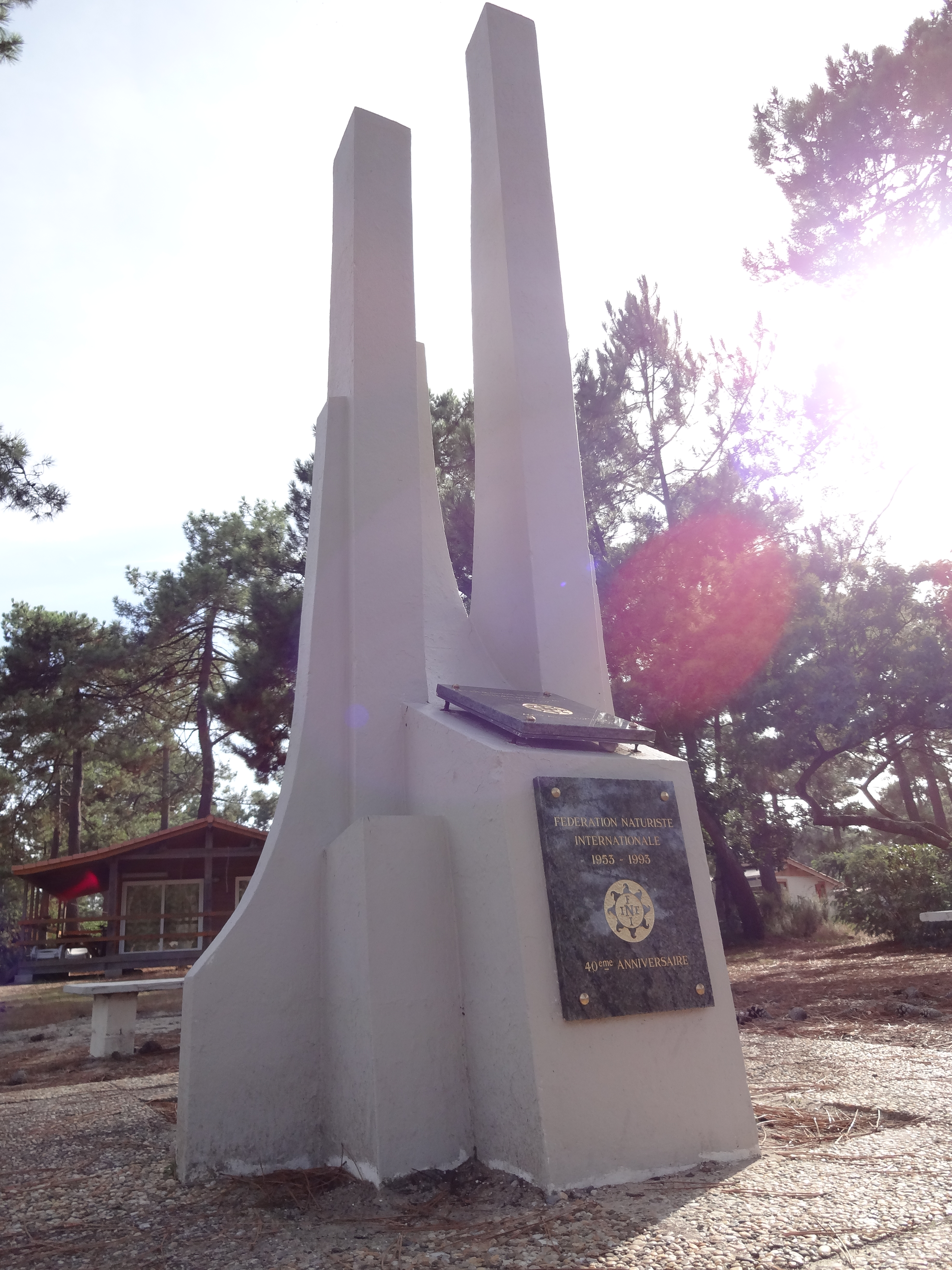
Monument commemorating the creation of the International Naturist Federation (INF) in 1953

The International Naturist Federation was conceived in London at the Festival of Britain but it was at the first congress, held at Montalivet in 1953, that the formal documents were signed.

In 1956, the site was first opened to non-members. A village of tents was set up in the new village 'Océanien'. In 1957, the 'Centre de Vacances' opened with 150 bungalows to hire. Naturism could only be practised within the 50-hectare (120-acre) site and on the beach 600 metres (2000 ft) away through a textilist zone on a boardwalk. Thirty-plus families purchased their own bungalows.

Throughout the 1950s the centre expanded, more land acquired on different leases and the centre became more popular. By 1959, over 10 000 visited during the summer, and on 15 August 1961, more than 3500 persons were on site. As the years passed, the facilities changed, restaurants were next to the beach and the sports and entertainment area consolidated away from the residential areas. Change brought disagreement and then acceptance and expansion. The food shop was originally totally vegetarian, but other shops have arrived and it now remains for a niche market.

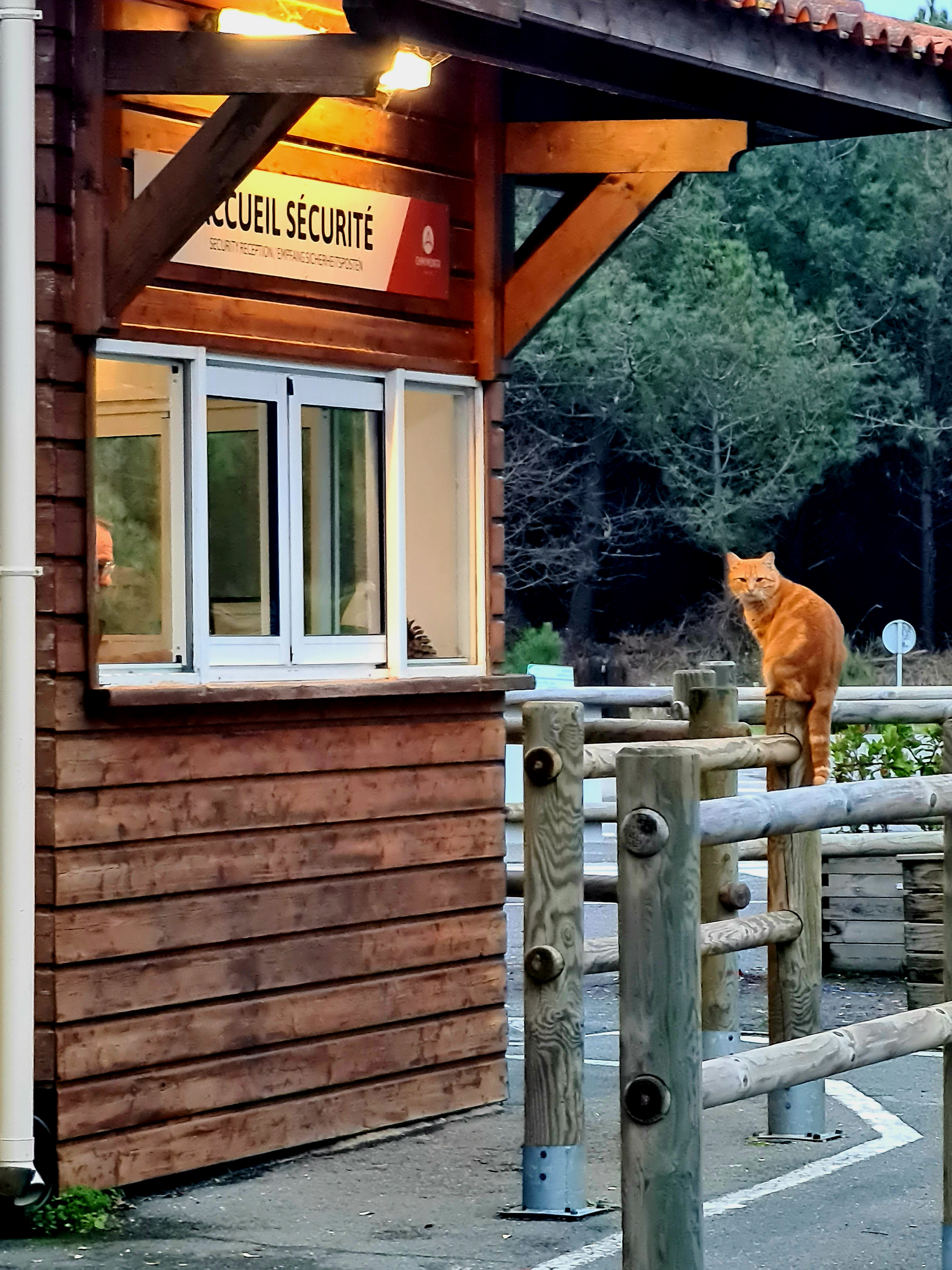
Access control

In 1966 came the opening of the first official naturist beach in mainland France, which by 1968 had emergency helicopter landing pads. By 1968, local sports teams were competing with CHM teams in Montalivet. The library expanded to 16 000 volumes and the entrance was moved to its present location. Monta then consisted of 65 hectares (160 acres) of bungalows, 40 hectares (99 acres) for camping, 20 hectares (49 acres) for sport, 20 hectares (49 acres) for walking and 20 hectares (49 acres) of beach. The perimeter was now 6 kilometres (3.7 mi).

The 1970s saw more foreign visitors: 37% Dutch, 24% Belgian and 21% German, the rest being from Australia, New Zealand, and the Americas. 1971 saw the construction of the thermal bath complex, and 1975 the first swimming pool. Up to the 1980s, volunteers were in charge of security, access control and maintenance in exchange for free camping.

In 1982 in high season, there was a tornado that killed one visitor, exploded caravans and uprooted a 50-metre (160 ft) swathe of trees. The following rain flooded many tents and bungalows.

In 1990, forty years after the founding of CHM, a road was named in Montalivet-les-Bains after Albert Lecocq. There is a continual upgrading and replacement of the oldest bungalows.

== Personalities ==
The American photographer, Jock Sturges, used Montalivet as setting for some of his published works such as The Last Day of Summer. There are many other resident and visiting celebrities whose wish for anonymity is respected.

== See also ==
- Euronat (naturist resort), another naturist resort in the neighbouring town of Grayan-et-l'Hôpital
