= François Malkovsky =

French choreographer

François Malkovsky (1889–1982) was a French choreographer.
