= Platais Island =

Island in Yvelines, France

Coordinates: 48°57′13″N 2°00′02″E

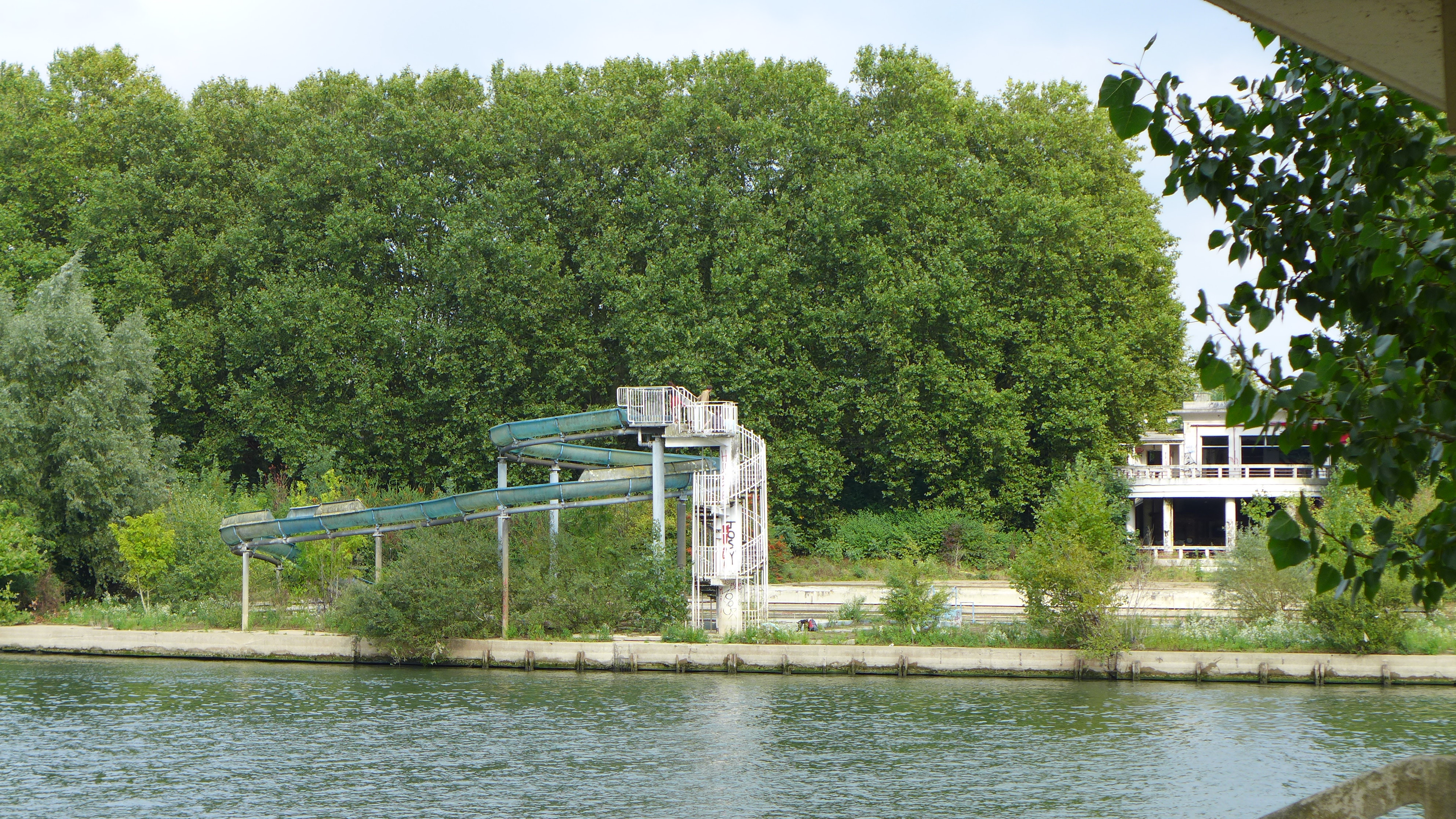
The Villennes beach, now abandoned.

The Island of Platais, or Island of Médan, is an island of the River Seine in France 30 kilometers downstream from Paris. It is approximately 1.7 kilometers long and located in the Yvelines department between Villennes-sur-Seine and Médan on the left bank, and Triel-sur-Seine on the right bank. It is positioned downstream from the island of Hernière from which it is separated by a narrow channel. It is administratively shared between the municipalities of Villennes-sur-Seine, Médan and Triel-sur-Seine. The island is not connected to the river banks except by ferries.

In 1880, the author Émile Zola bought a little Norwegian-style chalet adjacent to the island (today it is a museum), and frequently invited his artist friends Cézanne, Manet, and Pissarro to find inspiration in the dappled island light.

A stretch of the island known as "Villennes Beach" was a popular seasonal escape for Parisians who could reach it by boat trip downstream from Paris. The island's susceptibility to flooding has always been its biggest setback for any residential or commercial development. The Seine Flood Control Plan (PPRI) prohibits any construction along the river.

== Physiopolis ==
In 1928 a large part of the island was purchased by two Parisian doctor brothers, André and Gaston Durville, who wished to explore and exploit their ideas about nature cures and naturism. They set up a health resort on the island which they called "Physiopolis". The resort was originally a naturist one, but the Parisian authorities forced it to adopt minimal clothing by the mid 1930s. By 1930 it was attracting 2,000 people on sunny weekends. It lasted until the 1950s; remains of its chalets can still be found on the island.
