= Jules Grand =

French physician, writer, and activist (1846–1933)

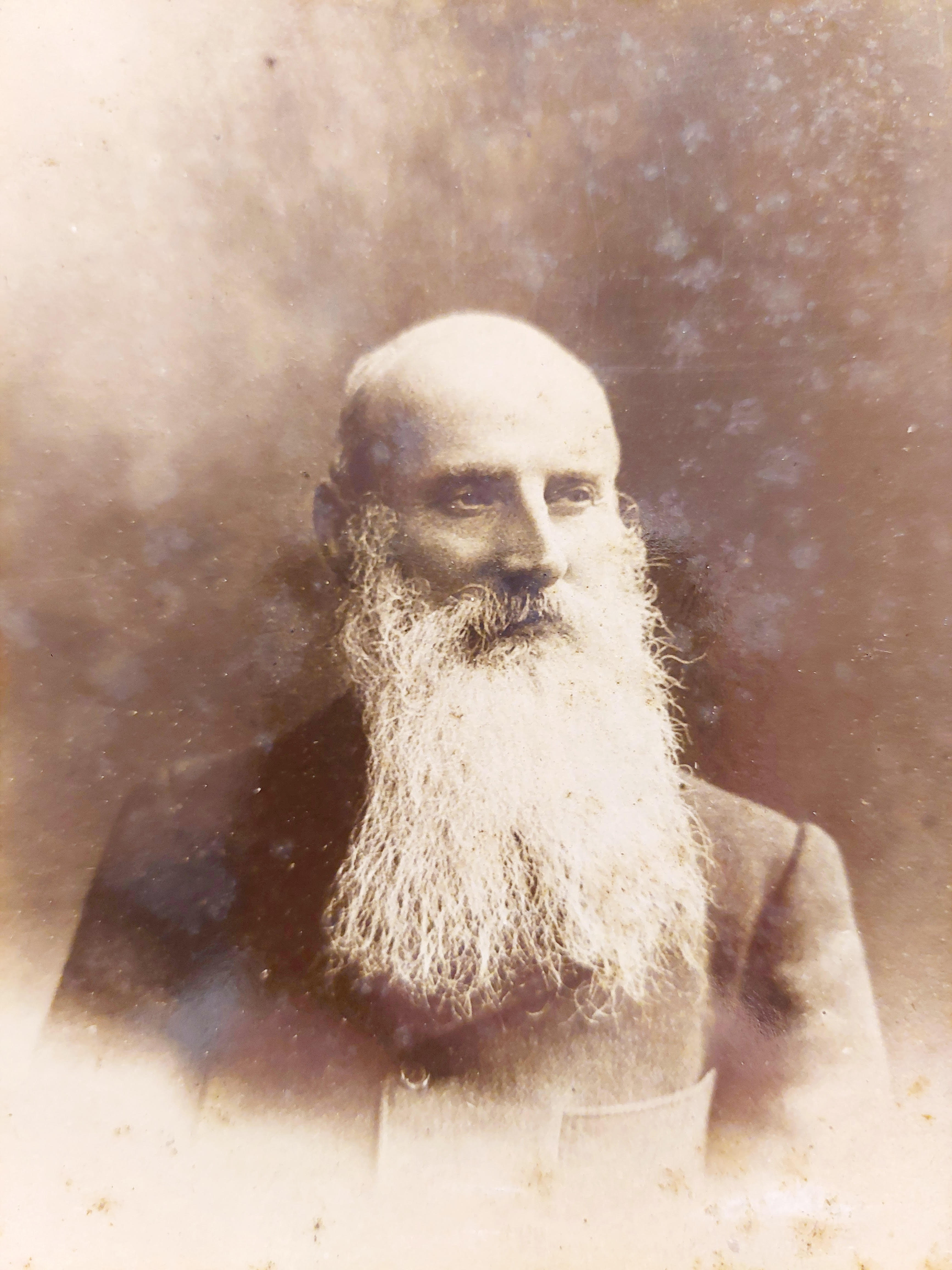
- Born: 1846
- Died: 1933 (aged 86–87)
- Occupations: Physician, writer, activist

Jules Grand (1846–1933) was a French physician, writer, Theosophist, and vegetarianism activist. He served as president of the French Vegetarian Society.

== Career ==
Grand completed his doctoral thesis in medicine on cataract removal in 1873. Grand was a physician at the École de Médecine de Paris (Paris School of Medicine). He was an associate editor of the 1893 and 1894 Annual of the Universal Medical Sciences and Analytical Index.

Grand was the president of the French Vegetarian Society from its formation in 1899. He was elected to the management committee in 1905 with biologist Jules Lefèvre and other physicians. By 1906 there were 800 members of the Society. In 1901, the Society published his book La Philosophie de I' alimentation ("The Philosophy of Food"). Grand also authored the introduction to Louise Smeeckaert's La table du végétarien, published by the Society.

Grand made anatomical, physiological and ethical arguments for vegetarianism. In June 1900, he was chairman and a speaker at the International Vegetarian Congress organized in Paris. In his speech he commented "that vegetarianism contributes powerfully to making the better man; that it ensures his intellectual capacity; softens his relations with his fellow men and makes them more fraternal". He argued in his essays that meat is responsible for the degeneration of the French nation. He stated that a vegetarian diet could prevent the misuse of alcohol. A paper he wrote on vegetarianism was read at the International Vegetarian Union's 1926 congress. He was an opponent of vivisection.

== Theosophy ==
Grand combined Theosophy and vegetarianism in his book Hygiene rationnelle vegetarisme ("Rational Hygiene, Vegetarianism"), published in 1912, stating that humans have a responsibility to protect animals. His vegetarianism incorporated theosophical ideas of an astral body and reincarnation. Grand also lectured on Theosophy in Amsterdam.

== Selected publications ==
- Du régime végétarien comme moyen préventif et curatif de l'alcoolisme ("Vegetarian Diet as a Preventative and Curative Means of Alcoholism"; 1899)
- La Philosophie de I'Alimentation ("The Philosophy of Food"; 1901)
- Hygiène rationnelle, végétarisme: causeries du médecin ("Rational Hygiene, Vegetarianism: Doctor's Lectures"; 1912)
- The Philosophy of Diet (translated by F. Rothwell; 1905)
- Le vin ("Wine"; 1919)
