= Miniten =

Tennis-like game played by naturists

Miniten (a portmanteau word, derived from mini+tennis) is a tennis-like game created by naturists. It was devised in the 1930s, in order to provide a suitable game for naturist clubs which often lacked sufficient land to create full-sized tennis courts. The original rules were drawn up by Mr R. Douglas Ogden, a Manchester-based businessman with an interest in sporting activities.

The rules and scoring are similar to tennis and standard tennis balls are used, but the court is much smaller, and instead of racquets, players use wooden bats known as thugs, which are shaped like a box around the player's hand.

The sport is run by the Amateur Miniten Association. Miniten: Rules of the Game was published in 2017 by Wolfbait Books. The book was illustrated by Colin Gordon.
