= British Naturism =

Naturism organisation in the United Kingdom

- Abbreviation: BN
- Legal status: Non-profit organisation
- Purpose: Naturism in the UK
- Location: 4 Pavilion Court, 600 Pavilion Drive, Northampton
- Region served: UK
- Members: UK naturists
- President: Mark Bass
- Chair: Colin Taylor
- Main organ: Executive Committee
- Affiliations: International Naturist Federation
- Website: www.bn.org.uk

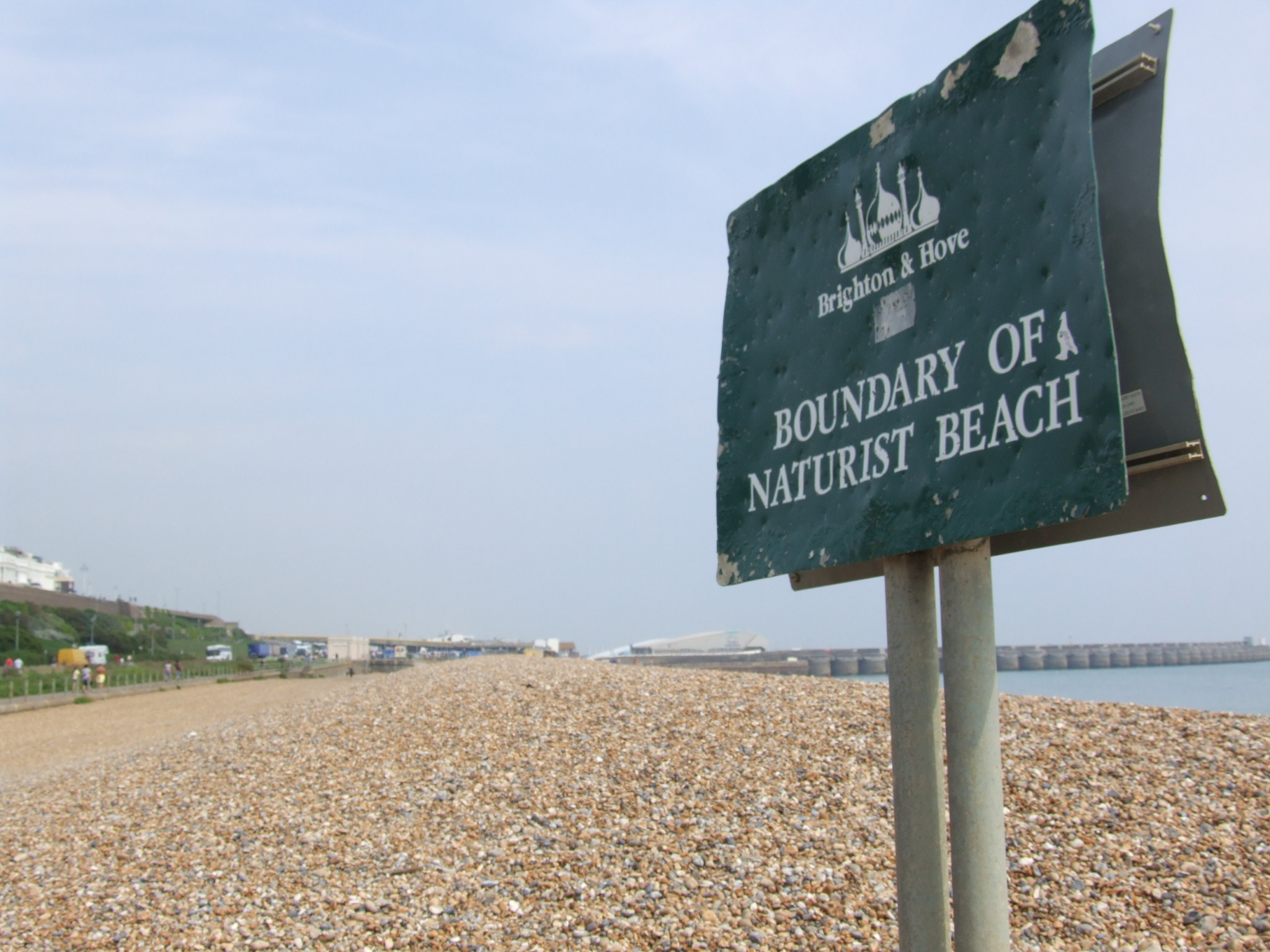
Duke's Mound beach in Brighton

British Naturism (until 2009, Central Council for British Naturism) is a members organisation with both individual and organisation members. It promotes the philosophy and practice of naturism in the United Kingdom, and it is recognised by the International Naturist Federation as the official national naturist organisation in that country.

== Definition ==
As a member of the International Naturist Federation (INF), (Note: The INF is made up of representatives of the Naturist Organisations in 32 countries, with 7 more having correspondent status.) British Naturism adopted the international definition of naturism at the 14th World Congress of the INF, meeting on 5 August 1974 at Agde, in the south of France.

The Declaration states that naturism is:

a way of life in harmony with nature, characterised by the practice of communal nudity with the intention of encouraging self-respect, respect for others, and respect for the environment.

According to non-statutory guidance issued by the Crown Prosecution Service—

Naturism is used to describe the activities of persons who espouse nudity as part of their lifestyle. Whilst many naturists will restrict their activities to specially designated areas and/or places where there is a tradition of naked activity, such as nudist beaches, others may wish to enjoy nudity more widely.

According to the guidance a balance is to be struck between the naturist's right to freedom of expression and the right of the wider public to be protected from harassment, alarm and distress.

== History ==
British Naturism traces its origins to 1891 when a short lived society called the "Fellowship for the Naked Trust" was formed in British India. This trust had ideals and principles very similar to many later organisations.

=== The Camp ===
The Camp was the first naturist club to be established in the United Kingdom. It was set up by someone known only as Moonella and existed at a country house near Wickford in Essex between 1924 and 1927. It was later replaced by a new venue called "The New Camp" near St Albans. This and several others were able to form the British Sun Bathers Association in 1943.

=== English Gymnosophical Society ===
Harold Booth published articles on naturism in many magazines at the turn of the century, and in 1922 the English Gymnosophical Society (EGS) was formed as a direct result of his work. It had a site in Wickford, Essex, which it used during the summer, and in winter it held meetings in London. By 1926 the EGS was renamed the New Gymnosophy Society and had a site at Bricket Wood, Hertfordshire which has subsequently been used by many different clubs.

The oldest club still in operation is Spielplatz which was founded in 1929 by Charles Macaskie and his wife Dorothy. It consists of 12 acres (4.9 ha) located in the village of Bricket Wood, in the English county of Hertfordshire.

Concurrent to this, naturism was also practised at the Welsh Harp in Hendon, apparently from as early as 1921. From this sprang the National Sun and Air Association which ran national advertisement campaigns, as well as running a gymnasium in Westbourne Grove, London. By 1937, membership of this society was running at over 2000.

=== British Sun Bathers Association ===
In 1943 the British Sun Bathers Association (BSBA) was formed and became recognised as a national federation of clubs, which by 1951 had 51 member clubs or groups. However, by 1953, personal and ideological differences led to the formation of the rival Federation of British Sun Clubs (FBSC).

=== British Naturism (formerly CCBN) ===
Both organisations existed until their merger in 1964 to create the Central Council for British Naturism (CCBN). By 2006, CCBN was usually referred to as 'British Naturism' but officially changed the name to 'British Naturism' at the 2009 AGM. In 2022 it claimed a membership of about 9,000.

=== Miniten ===
In the 1930s, a tennis‑like game called Miniten was developed within the British naturist movement, played with a wooden bat, called a thug, on a smaller court. The game was devised by Douglas Ogden, a Manchester businessman with an interest in sporting activities, who drew up the original rules.

Today, Miniten remains popular at many UK naturist clubs, with regional tournaments and taster events organised by British Naturism's Sports Officer.

== Milestones ==
- 1957 – Naturist films shown in cinemas.
- 1958 – International Naturist Federation congress in Britain.
- 1965 – The hire of public baths for naturist swimming began.
- 1970 – International Naturist Federation congress in Britain.
- 1978 – International Naturist Federation congress in Britain, and the setting aside of officially designated naturist beaches.
- 2003 – Parliament repeals all offences that explicitly make nudity an offence.
- 2007 – Parliament repeals the enabling power for councils to make bye-laws regulating standards of clothing to be worn for bathing.
- 2012 – First British Naturism National Convention held at Ilam Hall Youth Hostel
- 2013 – Second British Naturism National Convention held at Yarnfield Park, Staffordshire
- 2016 – Third British Naturism National Convention held at the Melville Hotel, Blackpool, from 14 to 16 October
- 2017 – Fourth British Naturism National Convention held at The Studio Venue, Birmingham, from 7 to 8 October
- 2018 – Fifth British Naturism National Convention held at The Studio Venue, Birmingham, from 6 to 7 October
- 2020 – British Naturism hosted the first online Global Naturism Forum using the Zoom videoconferencing platform, 14–15 October
- 2023 – British Naturism launched the Women in Focus (podcast).

== Campaigns ==
British Naturism has sought legal and political protection against discrimination for naturists in the United Kingdom, where an opinion poll in 2008 estimated the number of people describing themselves as naturist or nudist at 3.7 million. It also runs public facing campaigns, including Women in Naturism, which supports and encourages women to try naturist activities, Bare all for polar bears which seeks to raise money for environmental conservation and The Great British Skinny Dip, which encourages costume free swimming events to be run, not just by naturist clubs, but also public pools, spas, lidos and natural settings such as lakes. During the pandemic in 2020 British Naturism sought to build interest in naturism though a series of online events, including a public-facing charity event entitled "The Great British Take-off". In 2023 they appointed Helen Berriman as Women's Officer and later that year she launched their first podcast, Women In Focus which proclaims to be "dedicated to celebrating and empowering women through naturism".

In April 2018, British Naturism announced that in discussion with the senior officer at the police college a mutually satisfactory solution was reached, and the resultant preamble and "decision tree" for dealing with complaints about public nudity has been uploaded to the Police Training manuals. British Naturism argues that Naturism is protected as a philosophical belief under the Equality Act 2010. The Crown Prosecution Service issued guidance in 2013 updated in 2019, which, among other things, confirms that section 5 of the Public Order Act 1986 is unlikely to apply in cases of passive nudity. Serving police officers now have advice online and in their training manual. Using nudity for "intentional harassment, alarm or distress" remains an offence under section 4A of the Public Order Act 1986.

== Events ==
British Naturism hosts events throughout the year, including online events over Zoom, festivals, and other events such as trips to theme parks.

=== Online events ===
During the COVID-19 pandemic, British Naturism began hosting online events through the video calling service Zoom. These events included yoga, baking classes, book clubs, and aerobics.

=== Festivals ===
Every year, British Naturism hosts the Nudefest festival, where hundreds of naturists gather to listen to music, dance, and participate in activities such as bingo and clay pigeon shooting. Nudefest was founded by Andrew Welch in 2007, and takes place at Thorney Lakes campsite in July.

== Young British Naturism ==
Young British Naturism (YBN) is a division of British Naturism for 18- to 35-year-olds, focused on encouraging younger people to become naturists and members of British Naturism through events such as sports days, comedy nights, and spa days. The average age of British Naturism members is around 60, but YBN seeks to show that naturism isn't just for older people.
