= Hector Durville =

French occultist and magnetizer

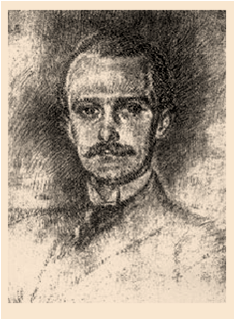
Hector Durville

Hector Durville (April 8, 1849 – July 1, 1923) was a French occultist and magnetizer. He is the father of Henri Durville.

Durville directed the Journal of Magnetism, which had been founded by Baron du Potet. He founded a number of occult institutions including:

- The University of High Studies, Paris. It consisted of the faculties of Hermetic Sciences, Magnetic Sciences and Spirit Sciences.
- The Practical School of Magnetism, Mozart Avenue, Paris.
- The Eudiaque Order, an initiate spiritual society, where the main objective consisted in magnifying the human person. Followers investigated animal magnetism and the effects of hypnosis.

== Books ==
- The Mysteries of Eleusis
- Magnétisme Personnel ou Psyquique, 1890 (Digital copy)
- Les Actions Psychiques à Distance
- Pour devenir Magnétiseur, 1890.
