= Henri Durville =

Henri Durville (1887–August 24, 1963), son of Hector Durville professed in his school which he called "the principles of dynamic physics" in which he showed the difference between animal magnetism and hypnotism. His studies were extremely advanced, and according to Francois Ribadeau-Dumas, in his book "History of the Magic stick" he claims that the studies of Henri Durville opened new horizons, specially in his investigations regarding somnambulism and the action in central nerves.

"Will goes along with Destiny as a directive potency of our evolution" (Durville, Henri).

== Books and publications ==
- Cours de Magnétisme personnel. 1920
- La Suggestion thérapeutique. 1922
- Les francs-masons. 1923
- Dieu les hommes. 1928
- Le Magnétisme transcendant. 1961
- Le Pouvoir Magnétique. 1960
- Le Pouvoir magnétique.... 1, L'Égypte, berceau du magnétisme. 1961
- Les portes du Temple. 1931
- Les vivants et les morts. 1922
- Sorts et enchantements. 1956
- Thérapeutique magnétique. 1953
- Vers la sagesse. 1922
- Victoire sur le mal, voici la lumière. 1921
