= Bare Oaks Family Naturist Park =

Naturist club in Canada

Coordinates: 44.1487°N 79.3723°W

- Company type: Privately held company
- Industry: naturism/nudism, recreation, camping, country club, tourism
- Predecessor: The New Forest Family Nudist Club, Toronto Helios Society
- Founded: December 22, 2006, First naturist/nudist club at location: 1972
- Headquarters: East Gwillimbury, Ontario, Canada
- Subsidiaries: Bare Boutique, Bare Bistro, Naturist Living Show
- Website: www.bareoaks.ca

Bare Oaks Family Naturist Park is a naturist resort located in southern Ontario, about 40 kilometres (25 mi) from Toronto. It encompasses typical amenities for day users, 110 serviced campsites, five cabins, and five guest rooms. The club is situated on 50 acres (20 ha) of privately owned, forested land at the edge of the Oak Ridges Moraine, within the Ontario Greenbelt. Harrison Creek borders the northern boundary while the Black River bisects the property. There are also two ponds and a small lake.

== Background ==
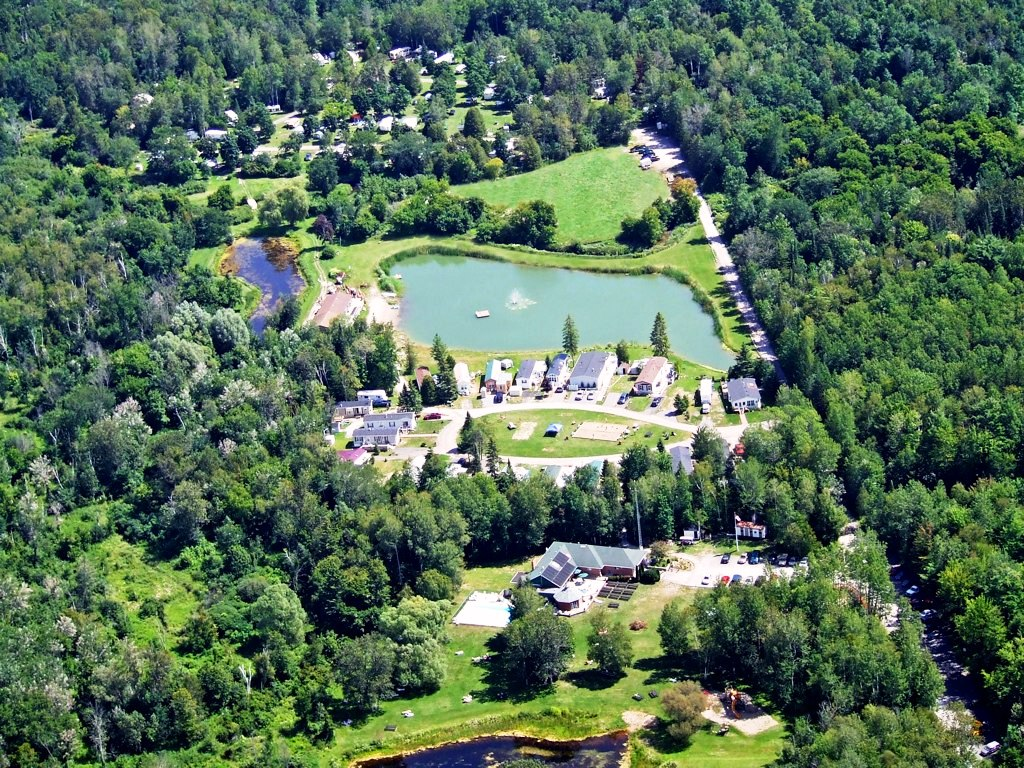
Aerial view looking east

The park was founded as the Toronto Helios Society in 1972. The first year was spent dredging the lake fed by a creek and natural springs (now known as Jarvis Pond) and a well for drinking water. The park officially opened as a nudist club in 1973. In May 1984, original owners Eric and June Jarvis notified the American Sunbathing Association (now the American Association for Nude Recreation) that they could no longer operate Toronto Helios as a club for nudists only and were changing it to a trailer park open to the general public. According to Eric, it was a sad decision that was based on a variety of factors (increased taxes on the property of an additional $1200, loss of job for Eric, etc.). From 1984 until 2001 the land hosted a variety of non-naturist businesses including an attempt to open a KOA campground.

On February 12, 2001, Carol and Larry Bean purchased the assets of Town & Country Resorts Inc. out of bankruptcy with the plan to return it to its former status as a naturist club. They renamed it The New Forest Family Naturist Resort. Unfortunately, the property had not been well maintained and much of the infrastructure needed significant work. The next several years were spent upgrading and repairing the facilities. On December 22, 2006, Carol and Larry sold the property to Linda and Stéphane Deschênes. It was more of a transition than a sale since Carol and Larry ensured that the property was sold to someone who would continue to develop the park as a naturist club. The park was renamed Bare Oaks Family Naturist Park for a variety of marketing reasons and as a wordplay on their last name (Deschênes being French for ‘of the oaks’).

The club is recognized by the International Naturist Federation, the Federation of Canadian Naturists, the Fédération Québécoise de Naturisme, the American Association for Nude Recreation, and The Naturist Society.

Bare Oaks adheres to naturist principles and rejects clothing-optional policies in favour of mandating nudity for all members and visitors.

In 2016, a music video for indie rock artist Brendan Canning was filmed at the club.

== See also ==
- Naturism
- Naturist resort
- List of places where social nudity is practiced
