= Felicity Jones (naturist) =

American naturism activist and blogger

Felicity Jones (pseudonym)
- Born: 1988 (age 37–38)
- Occupations: Activist, blogger
- Organization: Young Naturists America
- Known for: Co-founding Young Naturists America
- Movement: Naturism; Top freedom; Feminism

Felicity Jones (born 1988) is an American naturist who blogs pseudonymously for Young Naturists America. She is from Newton, New Jersey and is known for her activism in the nudism and feminism movements.

Jones is one of the co-founders of Young Naturists America. She created a blog in November 2010 which contains a variety of topics such as nudism, social nude activities, feminism, and art projects.

In early 2011, Jones began writing about a broader range of topics. She believes the United States has many core social problems that could be greatly diminished by incorporating more social nudity into people's lives.

Jones is very involved in social activism. For example, to promote body acceptance, she has participated in public art projects by artists such as Zefrey Throwell and body painter Andy Golub. While the art projects themselves are varied, they have all had a single common connecting factor, the incorporation of public nudity.

== 2011 ==
In August 2011, Jones participated in a nude art project called Ocularpation: Wall Street by Zefrey Throwell. During this art performance she was arrested by the New York Police Department for disrupting the peace and for blocking traffic; the charges were dropped a few months later.

She has also been working to promote top-free rights for women and had her first Top Free Day In Central Park in the summer of 2011.

Later in the year, Jones participated in an additional performance, this time a week-long game of strip poker in the window of an art gallery titled "I'll Raise You One" by the same artist which was covered by the NY Post and The Village Voice.

== 2012 ==
An art performance involving body painting took place in July 2012 and was the brainchild of artist Andy Golub. Jones and a few other members of Young Naturists America got completely naked in Times Square and had their bodies painted by Golub. The performance attracted hundreds of spectators who clamored to get pictures of the naked models. This event was covered by Vice Magazine, which published an article titled: "Waiting for the panties to drop in Times Square." This prompted her response blog post, "Naked Body Painting in the Heart of New York City."

She was interviewed on October 19, 2012, by Hollywood Today for a piece about censorship titled "Censorship and Social Networks – violence is in. Nipples are out!"

== 2013 ==
- January 18, 2013, Jones was interviewed by The Wall Street Journal about an off Broadway naked comedy show that she co-produced.
- January 22, 2013, Jones was interviewed by the Chicago Tribune about the impending San Francisco anti nudity legislation as well as her thoughts about the current lack of younger people who are involved with naturism.
- May 2, 2013, Jones was interviewed by Nancy Redd for Huffington Post Live. The segment was called "Let's Get Naked".
- August 3, 2013, Jones was interviewed by journalist Bill Briggs for a featured article on NBC News about the lack of young nudists in America. Jones was then quoted in a Digital Journal follow-up news article.
- August 4, 2013, as featured in the local news site The Citizen / AuburnPub.com, Jones attended the annual Northeast Naturist Festival in upstate New York. This festival is where naturists congregate and talk about issues facing the movement.
- November 7, 2013, reporter Hilary Cadigan wrote an article for Chiang Mai News titled "Naked Brunch." While the article mostly dealt with Thailand's first clothing-optional resort, The Oriental Village, the reporter cited Felicity's article, "Why Women Should See Other Women's Naked Bodies," as it dealt with body acceptance through social nudity.

== 2015 ==
On June 26, 2015, Jones explained why naturism is a positive impact on body image - a central topic in her writings.

In July 2015, Jones was interviewed in a The New York Observer article about nudism in New York.

She was also featured in New York Magazine in an article about meeting people on nude beaches.

== 2016 ==
In May 2016, Jones was interviewed in the Self article "This Is What It's Like To Live Most Of Your Life Naked". And in the Vice article "We Asked a Young Nudist Why Young People Aren't Nudists Anymore".

== Articles and blog ==
She has written for publications such as Failure Magazine.

Jones contributed a recommendation to the New York Magazine article "How to Swim All By Yourself."

In her blog, Jones addresses issues of public nudity, home nudity, nudist events, challenges getting nudist clubs to adapt to changing expectations, sex positivity and body acceptance. For example, she has written "How To Be A Sex Positive Person", "Home Nudist Etiquette With Visitors", and "It's Time for Nudist Clubs to Change Their Policies on Genital Jewelry".

The most recent entry to her blog was in September 2018.

== See also ==
- Body painting
