= YNA =

YNA may refer to:

- Natashquan Airport, airport for Natashquan, Quebec, Canada.
- Yeshivat Netiv Aryeh, a Religious Zionist Orthodox yeshiva in Jerusalem
- The initials of the Yugoslav National Army which was in existence until 1992
- Young Naturists America, a youth naturism organisation in the USA
- Yonhap News Agency, a South Korean news agency
