= FQN-FCN Union =

Official representative organization for Canada in the INF

The FQN–FCN Union is the official representative organization for Canada in the International Naturist Federation (INF). It was created by the French-language Fédération Québécoise de Naturisme (FQN) and the English-language Federation of Canadian Naturists (FCN) because the international body recognizes only one naturist organization per country.

== History ==
As the Eastern Canadian Sunbathing Association (ECSA), also known as the Canadian Nudist Confederation (CNC), was failing in late 1970's, the Fédération Québécoise de Naturisme was formed in 1977 but only to represent the province of Québec. But due to the lack of any other Canadian organization, they were recognized by the International Naturist Federation as the official representative for the country. This caused a problem when the Federation of Canadian Naturists was formed in 1986 to represent English-speaking Canada because the International Naturist Federation statutes only allow it to recognize one organization per country. To resolve this conflict, the FQN-FCN Union was formed and it replaced the FQN as the official Canadian representative.

== See also ==
- naturism
- List of social nudity organizations
