= Kleber Claux =

Anarchist, social nudity activist

- Born: March 22, 1893; Mogneville, Oise, France
- Died: June 9, 1971 (aged 78); Marrickville, Sydney, Australia
- Known for: Founding first nudist club in Australia
- Movement: Anarchism
- Spouse: Molly Crick
- Children: 2

Kleber Claux (22 March 1893 – 9 June 1971) was a leading anarchist in the early 20th century and a founder of the first naturist club in Australia.

== Biography ==
Born in Mogneville, France, Claux became a furniture maker before World War I, to which he was a conscientious objector. During the war, Claux escaped France and its conscription laws by moving to England on a false passport and living at Whiteway Colony, a Tolstoyan-communist anarchist project in the Cotswolds, Gloucestershire. At Whiteway Claux gained an interest in nudity, sensible clothes and vegetarianism and met Molly (née Crick), who became his life partner. They travelled to London in 1926 when she was heavily influenced by the gymnosophists. In 1929 they moved to Australia to help found an anarchist community near Cooktown in northern Queensland.

The family stayed at the commune until 1931 when they moved to Sydney, where Claux ran a fruit and vegetable stall in Liverpool Street. The Claux's soon became notorious in Sydney for their uninhibited ways, with Claux founding the first naturist community in Australia and his family all following the naturist lifestyle, calling on the Government to officially set aside areas for nudists.

Claux had a huge beard and wore shorts and sandals, even in winter, which made him a recognisable figure in Sydney, and led to his being cast in numerous films, including Eureka Stockade and Kangaroo, as well as on the stage, including the 1938 production of Transit (based on the book Season of Celebration by Albert Maltz) at the New South Wales Conservatorium of Music.

Claux's behaviour and attitudes to sex and nudity scandalised 1940s Australia. In 1947 Claux's 16-year-old daughter Moira was caught appearing nude in short films confiscated by Sydney police. Moira stated that like her father she was a nudist and that she found nothing wrong with appearing naked in films or photographs as long as it wasn't in seductive poses.

In 1948, a female journalist visited the Claux's and was equally shocked to see naked family portraits around the house and by Claux's admission that he and his wife allowed Moira to bring boyfriends over for the night, a taboo issue in 1940s Australia. The journalist's resulting article in Woman magazine was the first article in a mainstream Australian publication to seriously examine naturism.

The Claux's also hosted regular nudist parties, with a young Peter Finch an occasional guest.

Claux retired from his barrow in May 1956 and in 1958 travelled to England as Australian delegates to the World Naturist Congress. He claimed his life philosophy as "I don't believe in absolute good, or absolute evil ... A man can only try to go in the direction he believes is right."

Claux died in Marrickville, Sydney in June, 1971, aged 78. In addition to Moira, Claux had three sons. Eugene Crick Claux, the eldest, was born in Gloucestershire on 8 January 1929, studied art at East Sydney Tech 1944-49 and had paintings exhibited in the 1946 and 1947 Wynne Prize. He graduated in life drawing in January 1950, two months before he died aged 21 on 8 March after a mental breakdown. Eugene's dry point sketch of his father's head was donated to the Art Gallery of NSW in 2013.

A drawing of Claux by the Australian artist Douglas Dundas is in the collection of the Art Gallery of New South Wales.

== Filmography ==
Year	Title	Role	Notes
1949	Eureka Stockade	Miner	uncredited
1952	Kangaroo	Sailor	uncredited

== See also ==
- Anarchism in Australia
