= List of social nudity organizations =

The following is a list of social nudity organizations associated with naturism and nude recreation within a family-friendly, non-sexualized context.

== Major naturist organizations ==
=== Worldwide ===
- International Naturist Federation (INF) with regional member organizations in 34 countries.

=== North America ===
==== United States ====
- The American Association for Nude Recreation (AANR) Main national nudist organization
- American Nudist Research Library
- The Naturist Society (TNS) Main national naturist organization

==== Canada ====
- Federation of Canadian Naturists (FCN)
- FQN-FCN Union (Canada's official representative in the INF)
- La Fédération Québécoise de Naturisme (FQN)

=== Europe ===
==== France ====
- Association pour la promotion du naturisme en liberté – (APNEL)

==== Germany ====
- Deutscher Verband für Freikörperkultur

==== United Kingdom ====
- British Naturism – National organization formerly known as CCBN (Central Council for British Naturism)

== Topfree organizations ==
- Topfree Equal Rights Association (TERA)
- Outdoor Co-ed Topless Pulp Fiction Appreciation Society
- Go Topless Day
- Free the Nipple

== Advocates for Nude Recreation ==
Advocates for nude and clothing-optional recreation in North America diverge significantly from the norms of traditional "naturism" and "nudism" in the same geographical region, and therefore require their own category.

=== Canada ===
- Get Naked Banff - A clothing-optional advocacy group that was created to challenge Parks Canada's assertions that nude recreation of any kind is never allowed in Canada's national parks.
- Calgary Nude Recreation - clothing-optional recreation group located in Calgary, Alberta, that seeks to establish nude recreation as a lawful activity by applying the existing law in new and unique ways.
