= Fédération Québécoise de Naturisme =

Naturist organization representing French-speaking Canadians

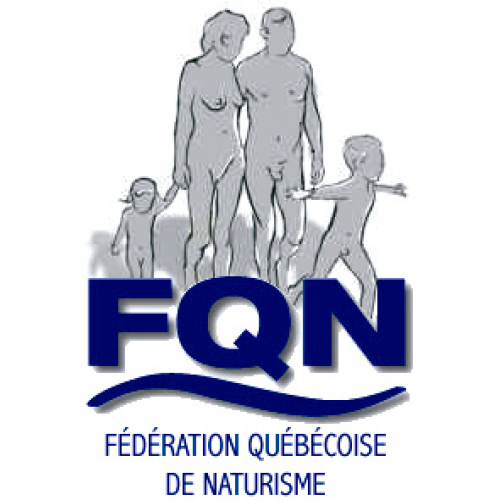
Fédération Québécoise de Naturisme logo.

The Fédération Québécoise de Naturisme (FQN) is the official International Naturist Federation (INF) representative for the province of Quebec and for French-speaking Canada.

Because the INF only recognizes one naturist organization per country, the FQN shares its membership with the Federation of Canadian Naturists (FCN). Together, the FQN and FCN form the FQN-FCN Union for the purpose of joint membership in the INF.

== See also ==
- Naturism
- List of social nudity organizations
