= International Naturist Federation =

Global umbrella organisation representing official national naturist societies

International Naturist Federation Fédération Naturiste Internationale Internationale Naturisten Föderation
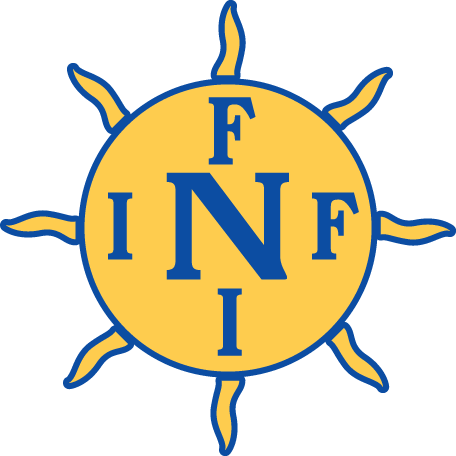
- logo
- Headquarters: Austria
- Official languages: English; French; German
- Membership: Country Federations

Establishment
  - Founding Meeting CHM Montalivet France: 23 August 1953
- Website; INF-FNI.org

The International Naturist Federation (INF), also known as Fédération Naturiste Internationale (FNI) and Internationale Naturisten Föderation (INF), is the global umbrella organisation representing official national naturist societies or associations.

== Membership ==
The INF is composed of representatives from national naturist organisations, with federation rules allowing only one national society per country to hold membership. To work around this rule, the French and English-speaking Canadian societies formed a partnership to participate in the INF.

Some national federations have independent youth organisations that are not directly affiliated with the INF. At the European level, youth representatives (European Naturist Youth – ENY, a committee of the INF mandated to promote naturism among Europeans aged 14 to 27) have elected a Youth Committee to liaise with the INF and its subcommittee, the European Naturist Commission (EuNat). Its role is to coordinate events and promote communication and exchange among young naturists.

INF rules allow individuals to obtain direct membership if no affiliated national naturist organisation exists in their country of residence.

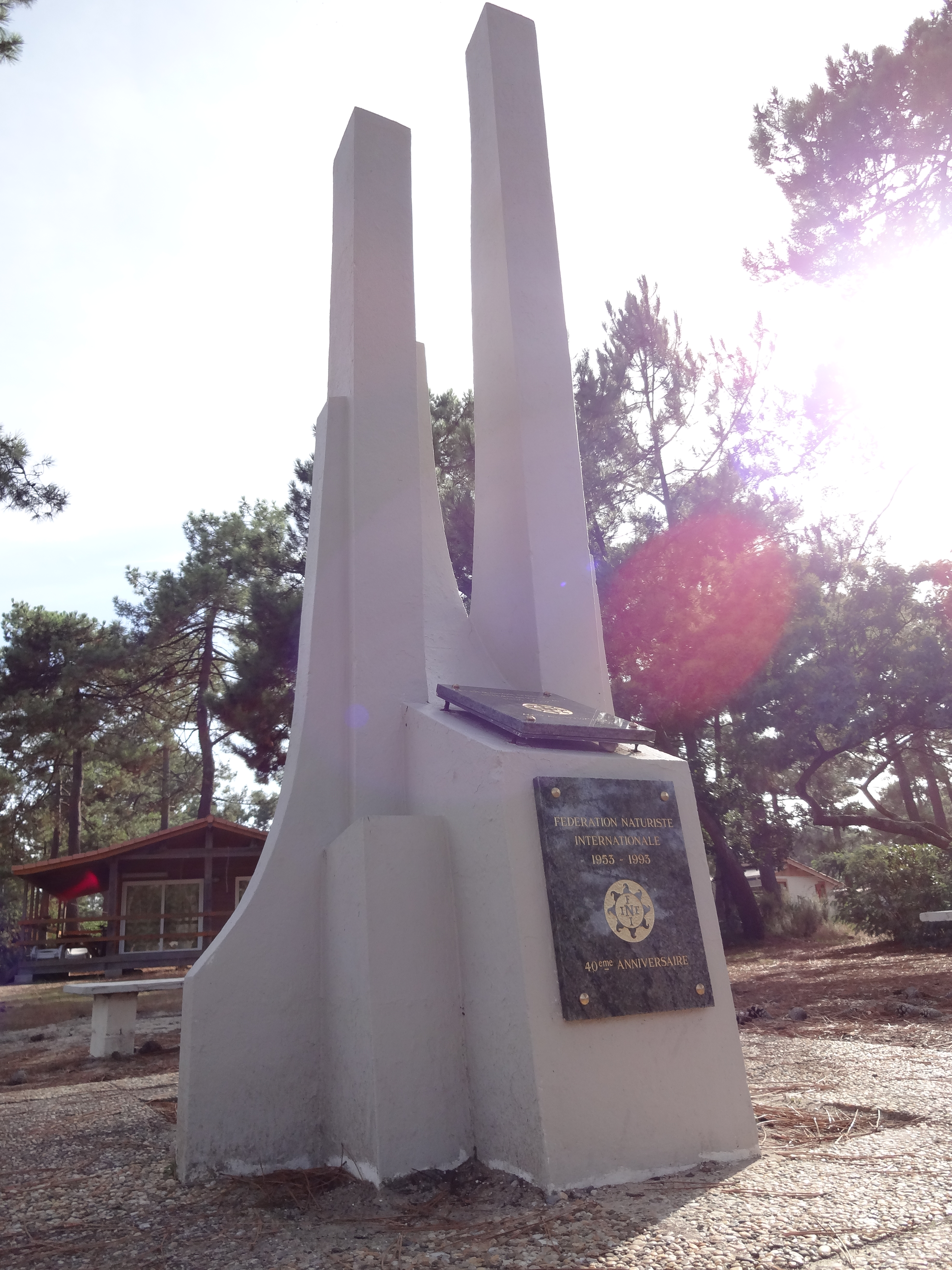
Monument marking the founding site of the International Naturist Federation (INF) at CHM Montalivet, France, in 1953

== Affiliated national organisations ==
All listed organisations are member federations unless designated as 'Correspondent'. The INF currently represents the following national federations and correspondents:

=== Africa ===
- Cameroon – Club Naturiste du Cameroun (Correspondent), Yaounde
- Democratic Republic of Congo – Congo-Association des Naturistes Congolais, Kinshasa
- Nigeria – (Correspondent), Lagos
- Senegal – Les Naturistes du Sénégal, Dakar
- South Africa – South African National Naturist Association, Pretoria

=== Asia ===
- Israel – Israeli Naturist Society (עמותה ישראלית לנטוריזם), Kiryat Ono
- Malaysia – Natural Wellness Society, Malacca
- Taiwan – (Correspondent), Shuilin Township
- Thailand – Naturist Association Thailand (เนเชอริสท์ แอสโซซิเอชั่น ไทยแลนด์), Bangkok

=== Europe ===
- Austria – Austrian Naturist Federation (Österreichischer Naturistenverband), Hörsching
- Belgium – Belgian Naturist Federation (Federatie van Belgische Naturisten, Fédération Belge de Naturisme), Antwerp
- Bulgaria – Union of Naturists in Bulgaria (Съюз на нудисти в България, Sŭyuz na naturistite v Bŭlgariya), Burgas
- Croatia – Croatian Naturist Federation (Drustvo Naturista Hrvatske), Zagreb
- Czech Republic – Czech-Moravian Federation of Naturists (Českomoravská federace naturistů), Prague
- Denmark – Dansk Naturist Union (DNU) (Dansk Naturist Union), Randers
- Finland – Finnish Naturist Federation (Suomen Naturistiliitto ry), Turku
- France – French Naturist Federation (Fédération française de naturisme), Paris
- Germany – Deutscher Verband für Freikörperkultur (DFK) (German Association for Free Body Culture), Hanover-Lagenhagen
- Hungary – Federation of Naturists in Hungary (Naturisták Magyarországi Szövetsége) (NAMASZ), Budapest
- Ireland – Irish Naturist Association, Dublin
- Italy – Federazione Naturista Italiana (Italian Naturist Federation), Piedmont
- Luxembourg – Luxembourgish Naturist Federation (Fédération Luxembourgeoise de Naturisme), Boevange-sur-Attert
- Malta – Maltese Naturist Association (Correspondent), Marsa
- Netherlands – NFN Open & Bloot (NFN Open & Bare), Amersfoort
- Netherlands – Internacia Naturista Organizo Esperantista (Special Interest Group)-(Correspondent), Rotterdam
- Norway – Norsk Naturistforbund, Oslo
- Poland – Naturist Federation Poland (Federacja Naturystów Polskich), Bielsko-Biała
- Portugal – Federação Portuguesa de Naturismo, Lisbon
- Romania – Asociația Ronaturism (ARN), Moldovenești
- Russia – Naturist Club "NATURWAY" Travel Agency (Агентство Натурвэй), Moscow
- Serbia – Naturist Organisation of Serbia (Naturisticka ogranizacija Srbije), Belgrade
- Slovakia – Association of Slovak Naturists (Asociácia slovenských naturistov (ASN)), Trnava
- Slovenia – Zveza Drustev Naturistov Slovenije, Ljubljana
- Spain – Spanish Naturist Federation (Federación Española de Naturismo), Madrid
- Sweden – Swedish Naturist Federation (Sveriges Naturistförbund), Malmö
- Switzerland – Swiss Naturist Union (Union Naturiste Suisse/Schweizer Naturisten Union/Unione Naturista Svizzera), Gampelen
- United Kingdom – British Naturism (formerly Central Council for British Naturism), Northampton

=== North America ===
- Canada – Union of the Quebec and Canadian Naturist Federations (FQN-FCN Union) (Canadian union of Federation of Canadian Naturists (FCN) and Fédération Québécoise de Naturisme (FQN)), Toronto
- Costa Rica – Costa Rica Naturist Association, San José
- Mexico – Federacion Nudista de México AC, Mexico City

=== South America ===
- Brazil – Federação Brasileira de Naturismo, São Paulo
- Chile – (Correspondent), Puchuncaví
- Colombia – Federation of Naturism and Nudism of Colombia, Bucaramanga
- Peru – Peruvian Naturist Federation, Lima
- Uruguay – Asociación Uruguaya Nudista Naturista (Naturist Nudist Association of Uruguay)-(Correspondent), Montevideo

=== Australia/Oceania ===
- Australia – Australian Naturist Federation, Mawson, Australian Capital Territory
- New Zealand – New Zealand Naturist Federation Inc., Hamilton

== World Congress ==
The World Congress of the INF has been held in the following cities. Before the founding of the INF, World Congresses were independently organised. At the 1953 World Congress, the INF was officially created, and all subsequent World Congresses have been organized by the INF.

- 1951 – London, England
- 1952 – Thielle, Switzerland
- 1953 – CHM Montalivet, France
- 1954 – Vienna, Austria
- 1956 – Hanover, West Germany
- 1958 – Woburn Abbey, Great Britain
- 1960 – Solbacken, Malmö, Denmark
- 1962 - BffL Hanover, West Germany
- 1964 – Héliomonde, Saint-Chéron, Essonne (near Paris), France
- 1966 – Athena Antwerpen, Ossendrecht, Netherlands
- 1968 – Penn Sylvan, Mohnton, Pennsylvania, USA (Note: An Extraordinary General Assembly was held in November 1968 in Lyon/France because several European federations had not attended the USA Congress.)
- 1970 – North Kent Sun Club, Orpington, Great Britain
- 1972 – Koversada (Vrsar), Croatia
- 1974 – Cap d'Agde, Sérignan, France
- 1976 – Naturistenbund Rhein-Main, Wiesbaden, West Germany
- 1978 – South Hants Country Club, Fareham, England
- 1980 – Flevo-Natuur, Netherlands
- 1982 – Cypress Cove, Kissimmee, Florida, USA
- 1984 – Costa Natura, Estepona, Spain
- 1986 – Sportbund Sonnland e.V., Freiburg im Breisgau, West Germany
- 1988 – Monsena (Rovinj), Yugoslavia
- 1990 – Natur und Sport, Zürich, Switzerland
- 1992 – Paradise Lakes, Tampa, Florida, USA
- 1994 – Rutar Lido KG, Eberndorf, Austria
- 1996 – Athena Antwerpen, Ossendrecht, Netherlands
- 1998 – Galaxen, Sweden
- 2000 – BffL, Hanover, Germany
- 2002 – Cypress Cove, Kissimmee, Florida, USA
- 2004 – Valalta, Rovinj, Croatia
- 2006 – El Portus (Cartagena), Spain
- 2008 – Tambaba Beach, Brazil
- 2010 – Pizzo Greco, Isola di Capo Rizzuto, Italy
- 2012 – Koversada (Vrsar), Croatia
- 2014 – Drumshanbo, Ireland
- 2016 – Wellington Naturist Club, New Zealand
- 2017 – Vienna, Austria (special meeting)
- 2018 – Lisbon, Portugal
- 2021 – Veržej, Slovenia (delayed until 2021 due to the COVID-19 pandemic)
- 2022 – Luxembourg
- 2024 - Zipolite, Mexico
- 2026 - Kecskemét, Hungary

== Presidents ==
List of INF presidents (also member of the executive committee and Central Committee)

- Richard Ehrmann-Falkenau (Austria) 1953 – 1956
- Erik Holm (Denmark) 1956 – 1964
- Gilbert Sarrou (France) 1964 – 1968
- Michel Caillaud (France) 1968 – 1976
- Frans Mollaert (Belgium) 1976 – 1980
- Alan McCombe (Great Britain) 1980 – 1988
- Bart Wijnberg (Netherlands) 1988 – 1995
- Karl Josef Dreßen (Germany) 1995 – 2000
- Wolfgang Weinreich (Germany) 2000 – 2007
- George Volak (USA) 2007 – 2008
- Sieglinde Ivo (Austria) 2008 – 2016
- Armand Jamier (France) 2016 (Election annulled by the INF Legal Commission)
- Sieglinde Ivo (Austria) 2017 – 2021
- Sieglinde Ivo (Austria) and Stéphane Deschênes (Canada) as co-presidents 2021 – 2024
- Stéphane Deschênes (Canada) 2024 – present

== See also ==
- Clothing-optional bike rides
- List of public outdoor clothes free places
- List of social nudity organizations
- Naturism
- Nudity
- Public nudity
- Skinny dipping
- Timeline of social nudity
