= Splore =

Annual music festival in Orere Point, New Zealand

- Dates: 21–24 February 2019
- Locations: Orere Point, New Zealand
- Years active: 1998 - 2026

Screenshot of Festival Logo

Splore was an annual boutique music and arts three day festival held at Tapapakanga Regional Park, in Orere Point, New Zealand with approximately 8,000 attendees.

The first Splore was held on New Year's Eve 1998 and the festival ran consecutively for four years and then took a year off. In between 2004 and 2014 the festival was a bi-annual event until 2015 where it was it announced that the festival would continue annually.

The final Splore was held in 2026.

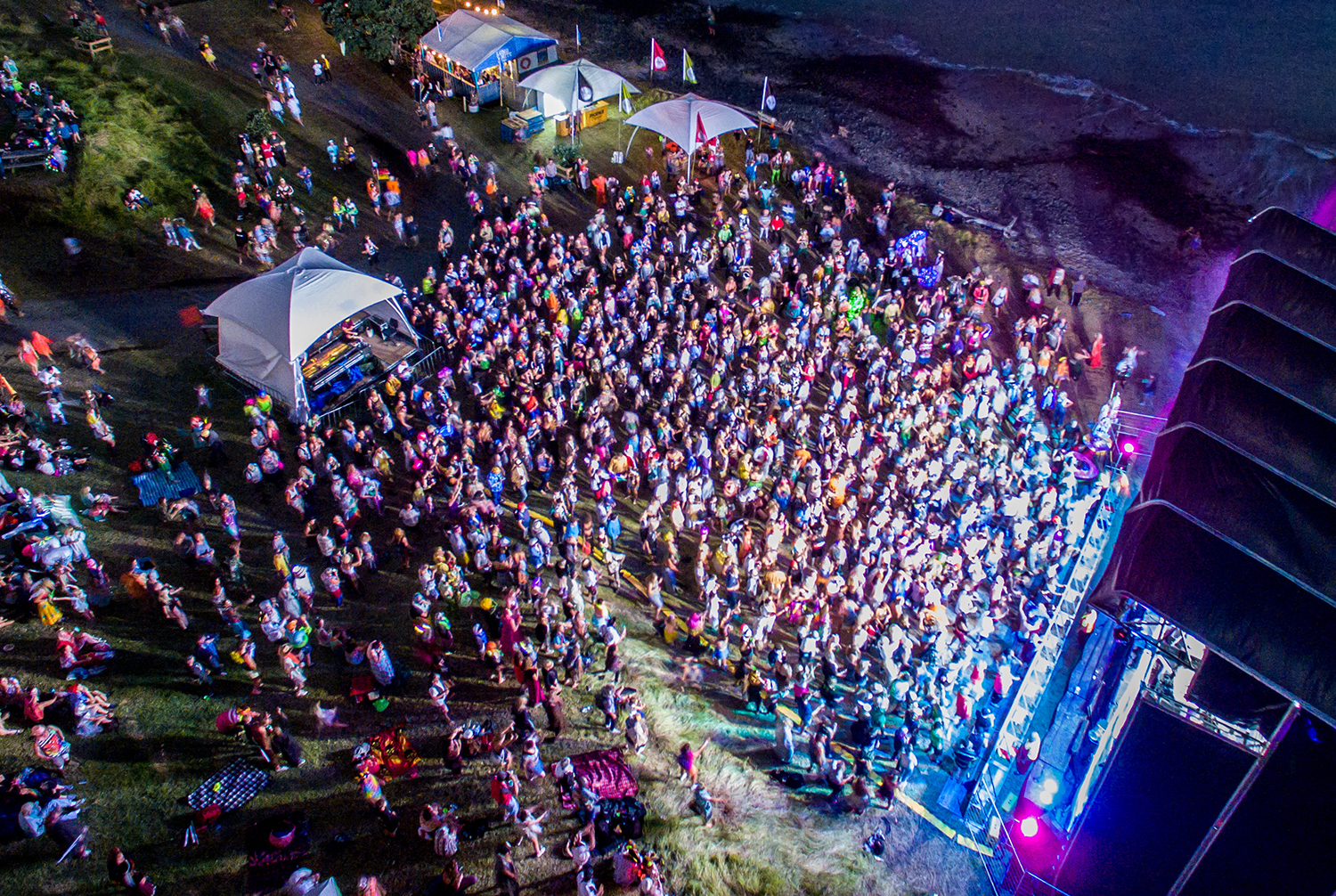
Splore 2016 Drone Aerial
