= Naturism =

Practice and advocacy of social nudity

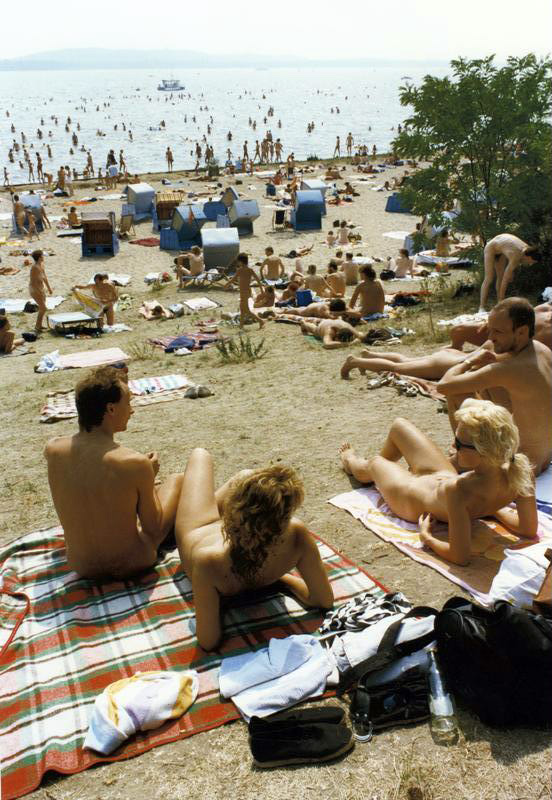
Sunbathers at Müggelsee lake beach, East Berlin, 1989

Naturism is a lifestyle of practicing non-sexual social nudity in private and in public; the word also refers to the cultural movement which advocates and defends that lifestyle. Both may alternatively be called nudism. Though the two terms are broadly interchangeable, nudism emphasizes the practice of nudity, whilst naturism highlights an attitude favoring harmony with nature and respect for the environment, into which that practice is integrated. That said, naturists come from a range of philosophical and cultural backgrounds; there is no single naturist ideology.

Ethical or philosophical nudism has a long history, with many advocates of the benefits of enjoying nature without clothing. At the turn of the 20th century, organizations emerged to promote social nudity and to establish private campgrounds and resorts for that purpose. Since the 1960s, with the acceptance of public places for clothing-optional recreation, individuals who do not identify themselves as naturists or nudists have been able to casually participate in nude activities. Nude recreation opportunities vary widely around the world, from isolated places known mainly to locals through officially designated nude beaches and parks, and on to public spaces and buildings in some jurisdictions.

== Definition and lexicology ==
The XIV Congress of the International Naturist Federation (INF) held at Agde, France in 1974 defined naturism as:

...a way of life in harmony with nature characterised by the practice of communal nudity with the intention of encouraging self-respect, respect for others and for the environment.

Many contemporary naturists and naturist organisations advocate that the practice of social nudity should not be linked with sexual activity. Some recent studies show that naturism can help grow self-esteem, and thus have a positive impact on having a well-balanced sexuality, too. For various sociocultural and historical reasons, the lay public, the media, and many contemporary naturists and their organisations have, or present, a simplified view of the relationship between naturism and sexuality. As of 2009, research has begun to explore this complex relationship.

The International Naturist Federation explains: (Note: The Hannover based Bund für freies Lebensgestaltung wrote: "Naturism is a new lifestyle caring for the body, the soul and the spirit in society. We live the ideal of freedom, conscious of its limits, taking up our responsibility. The expression of our will is nudity, our admission of sincerity".)

Each country has its own kind of naturism, and even each club has its own special character, for we too, human beings, have each our own character which is reflected in our surroundings.

The usage and definition of these terms varies geographically and historically. (Note: In his book, Cinema Au Naturel, author Mark Storey states "two related terms that we will continually run across are nudist and naturist. Although, the meanings of the two terms are virtually identical, they often have different connotations for those who prefer one to the other. In America people who believe that it is physically, socially, emotionally, and perhaps spiritually healthy to go about fully nude individually and in groups of mixed sex whenever weather permits and others are not offended generally refer to themselves as "nudists". In Europe, such people more often than not refer to themselves as "naturists".) Naturism and nudism have the same meaning in the United States, but there is a clear distinction between the two terms in Great Britain. (Note: The English version of the Agde definition was translated differently in Guide Mondial de Naturisme 96 97. Naturism (American "nudism") is a way of life in harmony with nature characterised by the practice of communal nudity with the intention of encouraging self-respect, respect for others and the environment.)

In naturist parlance, the terms "textile" or "textilist" refer to non-naturist persons, behaviours or facilities (e.g. "the textile beach starts at the flag", "they are a mixed couple – he is naturist, she is textile"). "Textile" is the predominant term used in the UK ("textilist" is unknown in British naturist magazines, including H&E naturist), but some naturists avoid using this term due to perceived negative or derogatory connotations. "Textilist" is said to be used interchangeably with "textile", but no dictionary definition to this effect exists, nor are there any equivalent examples of use in mainstream literature such as those for "textile".

== Naturist places and events ==
=== Naturist facilities ===
At naturist-organised events or venues, clothing is usually optional. At naturist swimming pools or sunbathing places, however, complete nudity is expected (weather permitting). This rule is sometimes a source of controversy among naturists. Staff at a naturist facility are usually required to be clothed due to health and safety regulations.

Facilities for naturists are classified in various ways. A landed or members' naturist club is one that owns its own facilities. Non-landed (or travel) clubs meet at various locations, such as private residences, swimming pools, hot springs, landed clubs and resorts, or rented facilities. Landed clubs can be run by members on democratic lines or by one or more owners who make the rules. In either case, they can determine membership criteria and the obligations of members. This usually involves sharing work necessary to maintain or develop the site.

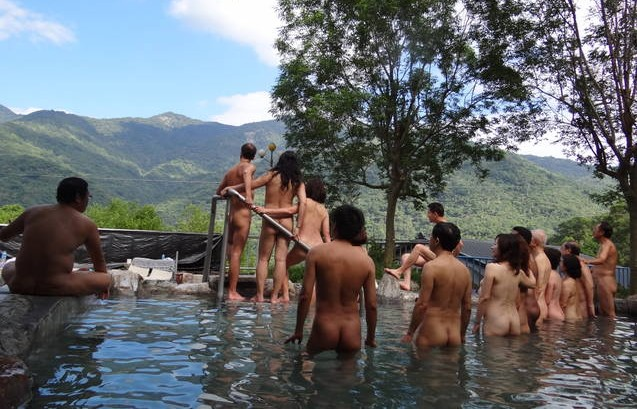
Families bathing nude at a hot spring in Taiwan

The international naturist organizations were mainly composed of representatives of landed clubs. "Nudist colony" is no longer a favored term, but can be used by naturists to address landed clubs that have rigid non-inclusive membership criteria.

A holiday centre is a facility that specializes in providing apartments, chalets and camping pitches for visiting holidaymakers. A center is run commercially, and visitors are not members and have no say in the management. Most holiday centers expect visitors to hold an INF card (that is, to belong to an INF-affiliated organization), but some have relaxed this requirement, relying on the carrying of a trade card. Holiday centers vary in size. Larger holiday centres may have swimming pools, sports pitches, an entertainment program, kids' clubs, restaurants and supermarkets. Some holiday centres allow regular visitors to purchase their own chalets, and generations of the same families may visit each year. Holiday centres are more tolerant of clothing than members-only clubs; total nudity is usually compulsory in the swimming pools and may be expected on the beaches, while on the football pitches, or in the restaurants in the evening, it is rare.

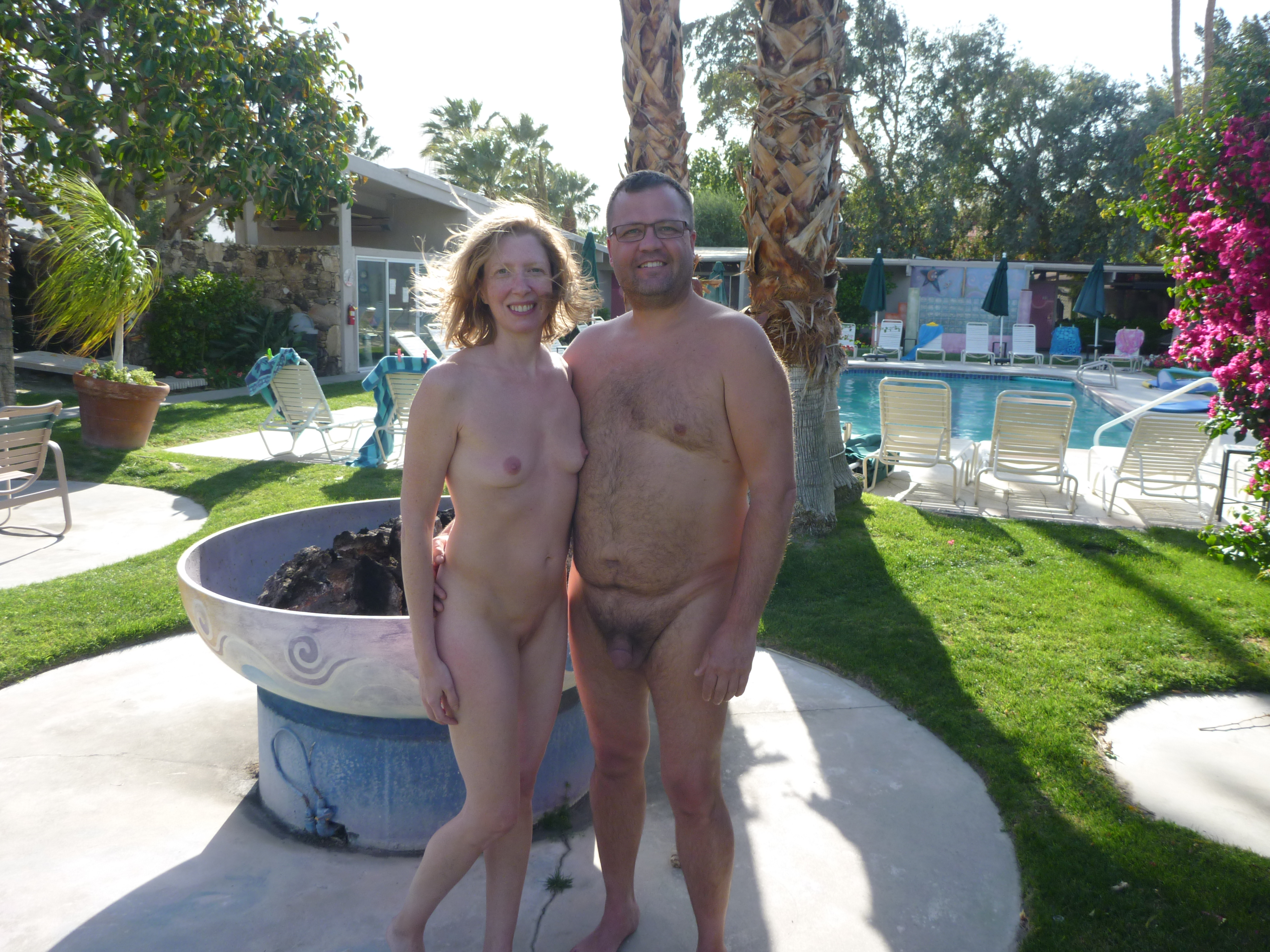
Nudist couple at Terra Cotta Inn, Palm Springs, California, US

A naturist resort is, to a European, a private property with accommodation and facilities where naturism is the norm. Centre Helio-Marin in Vendays Montalivet, France (the first naturist resort, established in 1950); the naturist village of Charco del Palo on Lanzarote, Canary Islands; Vera Playa in Spain; and Vritomartis Resort in Greece are examples.

In US usage, a naturist resort can mean a holiday centre. Freikörperkultur (FKK)—literally translated as 'free body culture'—is the name for the general movement in Germany. The abbreviation is recognised outside of Germany and can be found on informal signs indicating the direction to a remote naturist beach.

=== Nude beaches ===
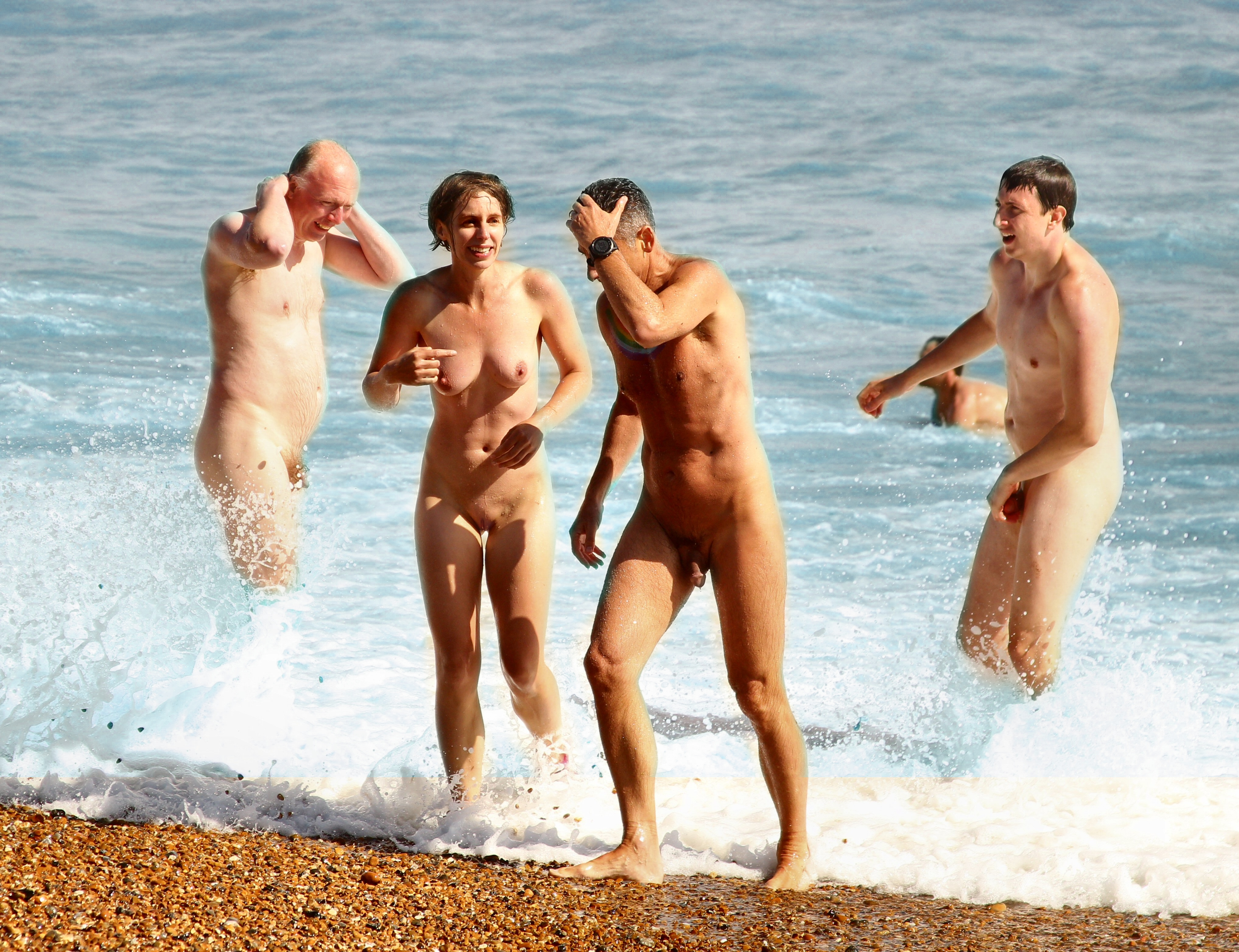
People bathing naked after the World Naked Bike Ride in Brighton, 2017

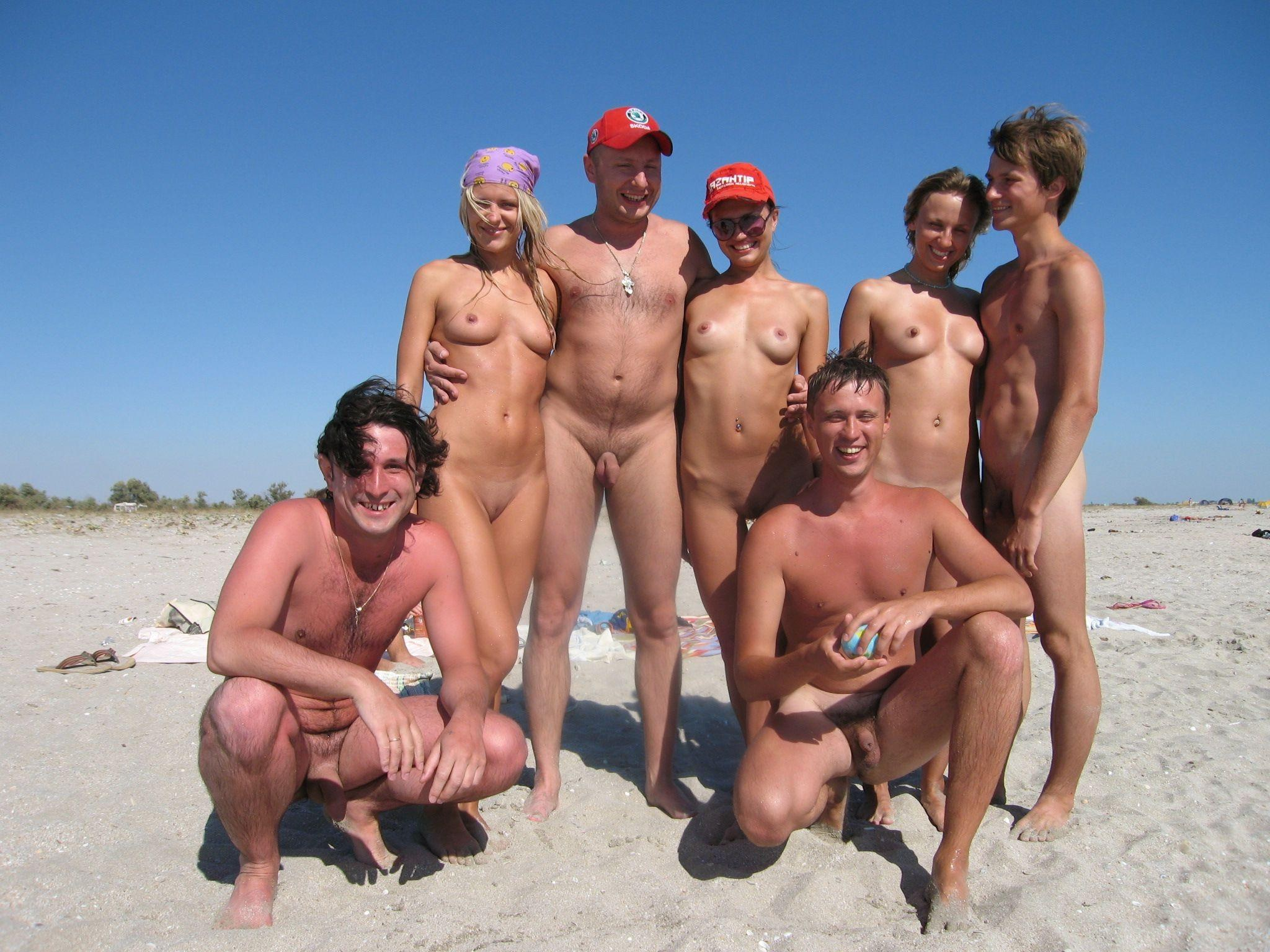
A group of naturists at a nude beach in Crimea, 2008

In some European countries, such as Denmark, all beaches are clothing optional, and in others like Germany (and experimentally in France) there are naturist sunbathing areas in public parks (e.g., in Munich and Berlin). Beaches in some holiday destinations, such as Crete, are clothing optional except some central urban beaches. There are two centrally located clothes-optional beaches in Barcelona. Sweden allows nudity on all beaches.

In a survey by The Daily Telegraph, Germans and Austrians were most likely to have visited a nude beach (28%), followed by Norwegians (18%), Spaniards (17%), Australians (17%), and New Zealanders (16%). Of the nationalities surveyed, the Japanese (2%) were the least likely to have visited a nude beach. This result may indicate the lack of nude beaches in Japan. However, the Japanese are open with regard to family bathing nude at home and at onsens (hot springs).

=== Festival naturism ===
From Woodstock to Edinburgh, and Nambassa in the southern hemisphere, communal nudity can be seen at music and counterculture festivals.

The Nambassa hippie festivals held in New Zealand in the late 1970s were examples of non-sexual naturism. Of the 75,000 patrons who attended the 1979 Nambassa three-day festival, an estimated 35% of attendees spontaneously chose to remove their clothing, preferring complete or partial nudity.

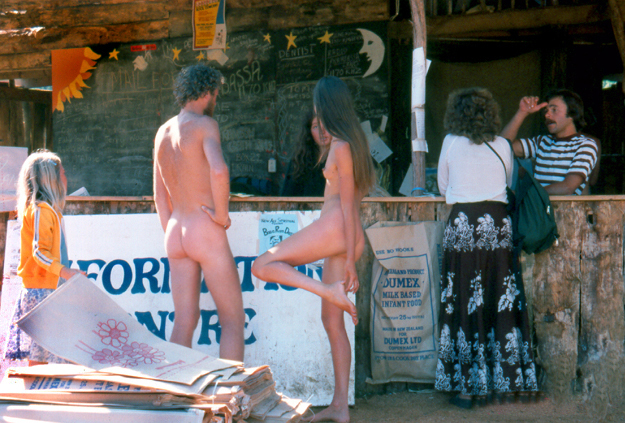
Naturist couple at the Nambassa festival, New Zealand, 1981

Some nudist festivals are held to celebrate particular days of the year, and activities may include nude bodypainting. One example is the Neptune Day Festival held in Koktebel, Crimea to depict mythological events. Another is the Festival Nudista Zipolite organized by the Federación Nudista de México (Mexican Nudist Federation) held annually since 2016 on the first weekend of February.

A few camps organize activities in the nude, such as oil wrestling by camp Gymnasium.

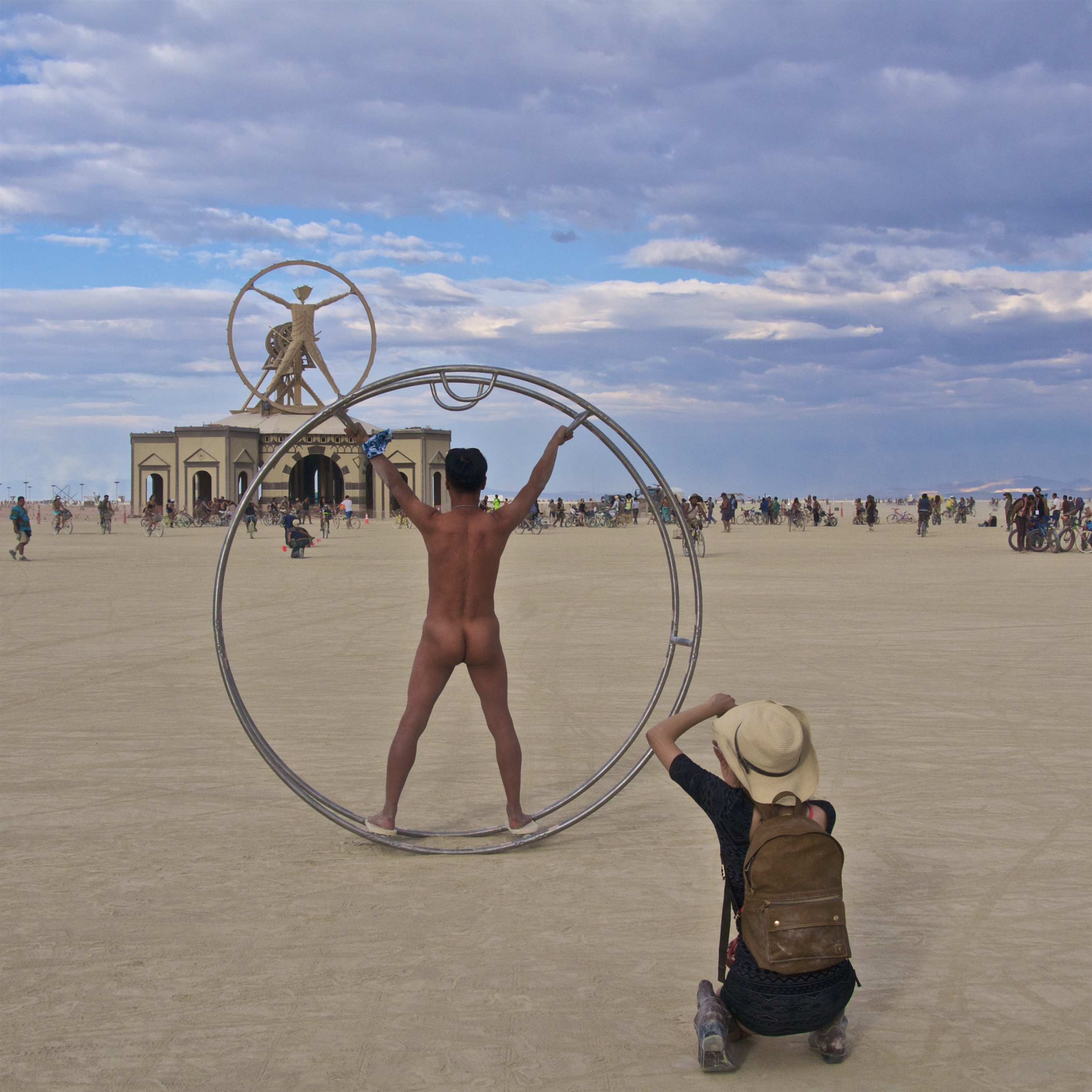
Naked participant at Burning Man 2016 posing as Leonardo da Vinci's Vitruvian Man

=== Summer naturism ===
Naturism tends to be more common during the warmer summer months. Some regions host first-time naturists and people who have recently started to practice the naturist lifestyle. One study noted that some of these people are seasonal naturists who wear clothes during other times of the year.

== History ==
Nudity in social contexts has been practised in various forms by many cultures and in all time periods. In modern Western society, social nudity is most frequently encountered in the contexts of bathing, swimming and using saunas, but throughout history and in many contemporary tropical cultures, nudity is a norm at many sports events and competitions.

The first known use of the word naturisme occurred in 1778. A French-speaking Belgian, Jean Baptiste Luc Planchon (1734–1781), used the term to advocate nudism as a means of improving the hygiène de vie or healthy living.

The earliest known naturist club in the western sense of the word was established in British India in 1891. The Fellowship of the Naked Trust was founded by Charles Edward Gordon Crawford, a widower who was a District and Sessions Judge for the Bombay Civil Service. The commune was based in Matheran and had just three members at the beginning: Crawford and two sons of an Anglican missionary, Andrew and Kellogg Calderwood. The commune fell apart when Crawford was transferred to Ratnagiri; he died soon after in 1894.

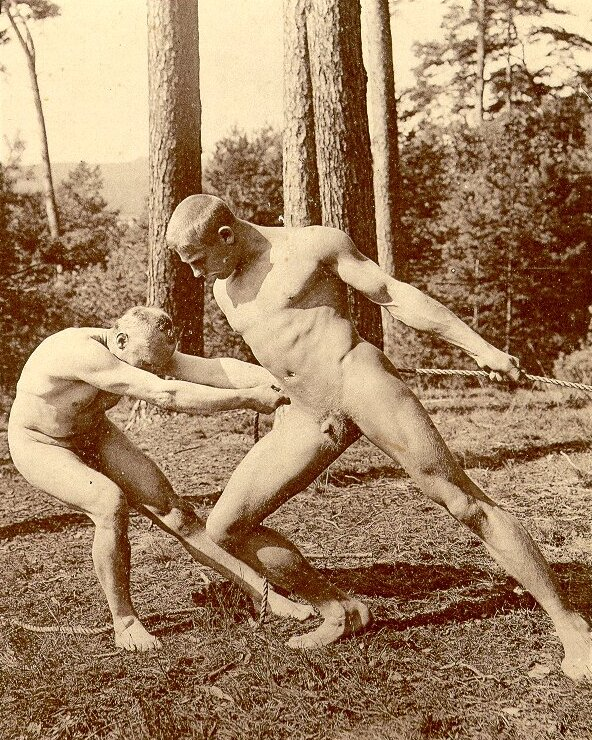
Max Koch's Freilicht (Open-Air), c. 1894/1897

In 1902, a series of philosophical papers was published in Germany by Dr. Heinrich Pudor under the pseudonym Heinrich Scham, who coined the term Nacktkultur (Nude Culture). In 1906, he wrote a three-volume treatise with this term as its title, which discussed the benefits of nudity in co-education and advocated participating in sports while being free of cumbersome clothing. Richard Ungewitter (Nacktheit, 1906, Nackt, 1908, etc.) proposed that combining physical fitness, sunlight, and fresh-air bathing with the nudist philosophy contributed to mental and psychological fitness, good health, and an improved moral-life view. Major promoters of these ideas included Adolf Koch and Hans Surén, who was an instructor and manager at the German Army School of Military Physical Education in Wünsdorf. Germany published the first journal of nudism from 1902 to 1932, during which time it evolved and became known as Freikörperkultur (FKK), the free body culture movement.

The wide publication of those papers, and others, contributed to an explosive worldwide growth of nudism in which nudists participated in various social, recreational, and physical fitness activities in the nude. The first organized club for nudists on a large scale, Freilichtpark (Open-Air Park), was opened near Hamburg in 1903 by Paul Zimmerman. In 1919, German doctor Kurt Huldschinsky discovered that exposure to sunlight helped to cure rickets in many children, causing sunlight to be associated with improved health.

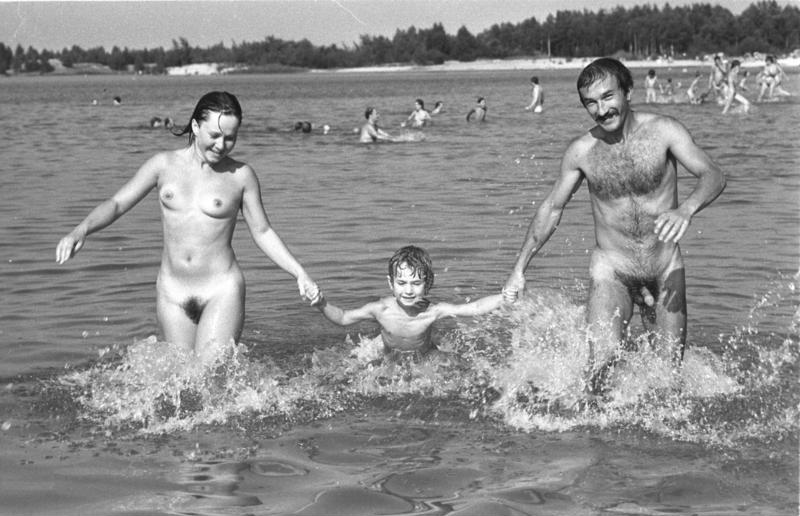
Naturist family on Lake Senftenberg in 1983

In France in the early 20th century, the brothers Gaston and André Durville, both physicians, studied the effects of psychology, nutrition, and environment on health and healing. They became convinced of the importance of natural foods and the natural environment on human well-being and health. They named this concept naturisme. The profound effect of clean air and sunlight on human bodies became evident to them and so nudity became a part of their naturism.

Naturism became a more widespread phenomenon in the 1920s in Germany, the United Kingdom, France and other European countries and spread to the United States, where it became established in the 1930s. In Brazil, nudist magazines were already published in the 1930. In mid 50s, there were several of such publications and some editors were persecuted by police and sued by authorities under the charge of "indecent exposure".

By 1951, the various national federations united to form the International Naturist Federation. Some naturists preferred not to join clubs, and after 1945, pressure arose to designate beaches for naturist use. From the middle of the 20th century, with changing leisure patterns, commercial organisations began opening holiday resorts to attract naturists who expected the same – or better – standards of comfort and amenity offered to non-naturists. More recently, naturist holiday options have expanded to include cruises.

In the early 21st century, many organised clubs saw a decline in attendance by young people, which worried many naturists about the future of the movement. The clubs' aging memberships may have put younger people off. A rise in social conservatism, re-asserting a nudity taboo, also may have contributed to the decline. However, since tolerance for nudity in general is increasing over time, and is higher among younger generations, an alternative hypothesis is that younger naturists no longer feel they need to join a club or visit a resort in order to practise naturism. Active recruitment of younger members is being pursued by some organisations. The phenomenon varies by country, with, for example, naturism in France experiencing steady growth in a younger demographic during the 2010s. A similar trend is seen in Germany, with young people eager to depart from social norms and beauty standards.

== Writers ==
Naturism was part of a literary movement in the late 19th century (see the writings of André Gide) that also influenced the art movements of the time, specifically Henri Matisse and other Fauve painters. This movement was based on the French concept of joie de vivre, the idea of reveling freely in physical sensations and direct experiences and a spontaneous approach to life.

- Heinrich Pudor wrote on methods to improve social hygiene in his book Nackende Menschen und Jauchzen der Zukunft ('Naked people and the rejoicing of the future') and then Nacktkultur ('Nude Culture'). It prescribes an austere lifestyle and nudity.
- Paul Zimmermann opened the Freilicht Park in Lübeck which was open to those who subscribed to Nacktkultur principles.
- Richard Ungewitter wrote Die Nacktheit ('Nakedness') which sold 90,000 copies, prescribed a similar Utopian lifestyle, where everyone would be nude, eat only vegetables and abstain from alcohol and tobacco. In his Utopia, everyone was to be Germanic with blue eyes and blonde hair.
- Adolf Koch, a left-wing primary-school teacher, sought to use social nudity to free the people from "authority fixated conditioning which held proletarians in deference of their masters: parental authority, paternalism of the church, the mass media and organs of law and order." He used Organic-Rhythmic exercises in Berlin schools in the 1920s. In 1932 there were about 100,000 Germans involved with naturism, of which 70,000 were in Koch's Körperschülen schools.
- Hans Surén taught nude gymnastics to soldiers for five years, and on being forced to leave the army, he wrote (in 1924) Der Mensch und die Sonne ('Man and the Sun') which ran to 61 reprints.
- American writers Walt Whitman and Henry David Thoreau both wrote of nudity within the natural environment.

== Health ==
Naturist activities can have positive psychological benefits including greater life satisfaction, more positive body image, and higher self-esteem. Social nudity leads to acceptance in spite of differences in age, body shape, fitness, and health.

== Religion ==
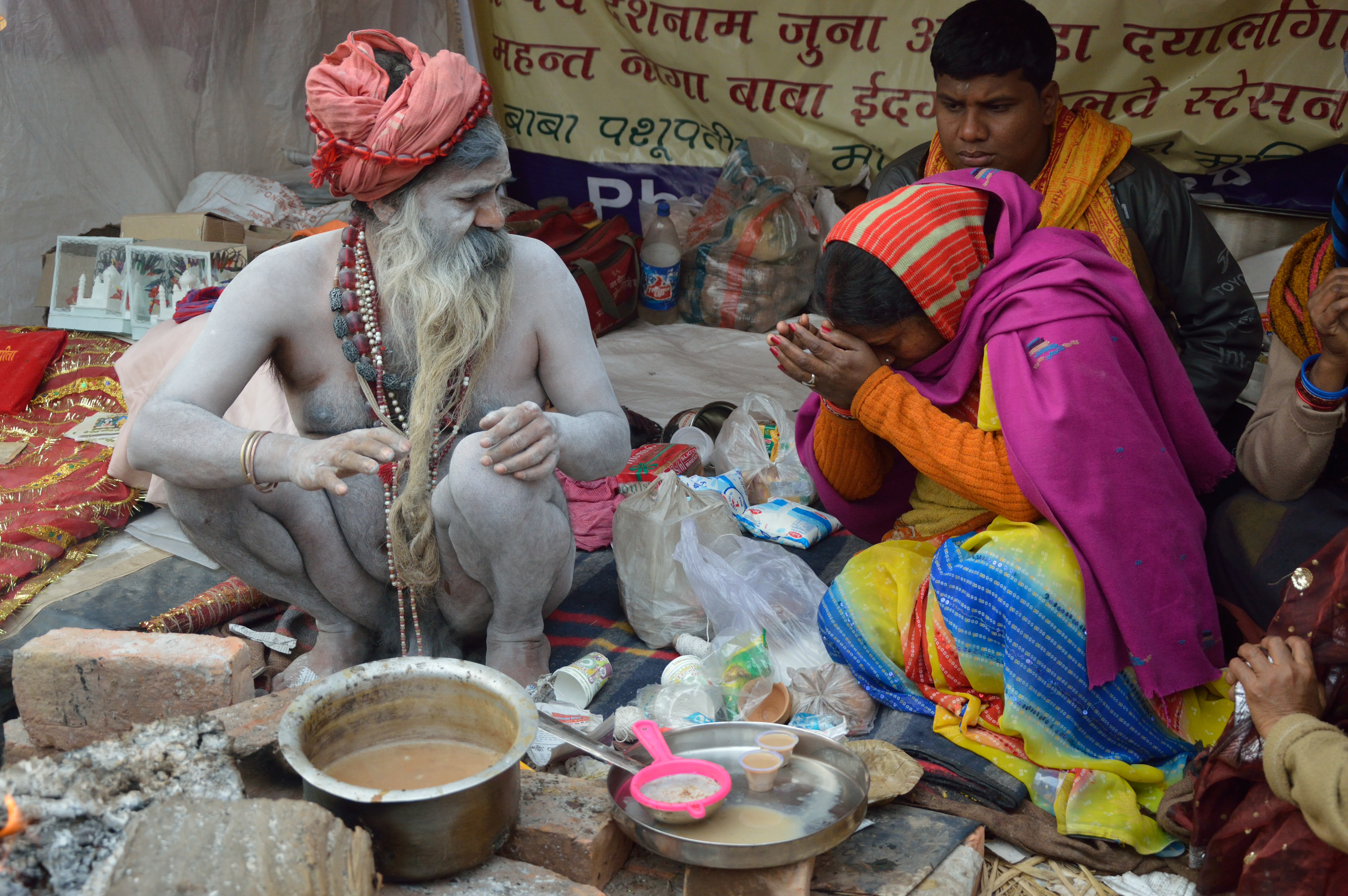
A Naga Sadhu, or naked Hindu holy man

Christian naturism includes various members associated with most denominations. Although beliefs vary, a common theme is that much of Christianity has misinterpreted the events regarding the Garden of Eden, and that God was displeased with Adam and Eve for covering their bodies with fig leaves.

== Controversy ==
Naturism is usually promoted as not being sexual, but there are resorts where social nudity is practised alongside exhibitionism, voyeurism, and other alternative lifestyles like swinging. Mainstream discourse around naturism sometimes conflates sexual and non-sexual variations, though family-oriented naturism organisations try to resist this stigma. Some naturist clubs have shifted to catering to swingers, and as a result may be expelled from mainstream naturist organizations, whilst some naturist villages, notably Cap d'Agde, have been successfully overtaken by swingers and "libertines". Others struggle with wanting to maintain a family image while being lax in behavior enforcements for fear of losing revenue and no longer being financially viable. Attempts have been made to legislate naturist activity, such as children's summer camps.

Many films and published materials in the middle decades of the 20th century were presented as documentaries of the naturist lifestyle. In fact this was largely a pretext to exploit a loophole in censorship laws restricting the exhibition of nudity. Additionally, child pornography has been distributed under the guise of naturist media. Precisely defining the distinction has proved challenging for law enforcers, as it depends on the subjective question of whether the purpose of the production is sexual. Court cases attempting to differentiate naturist publications from pornography reach back almost a century.

== Africa ==
=== South Africa ===
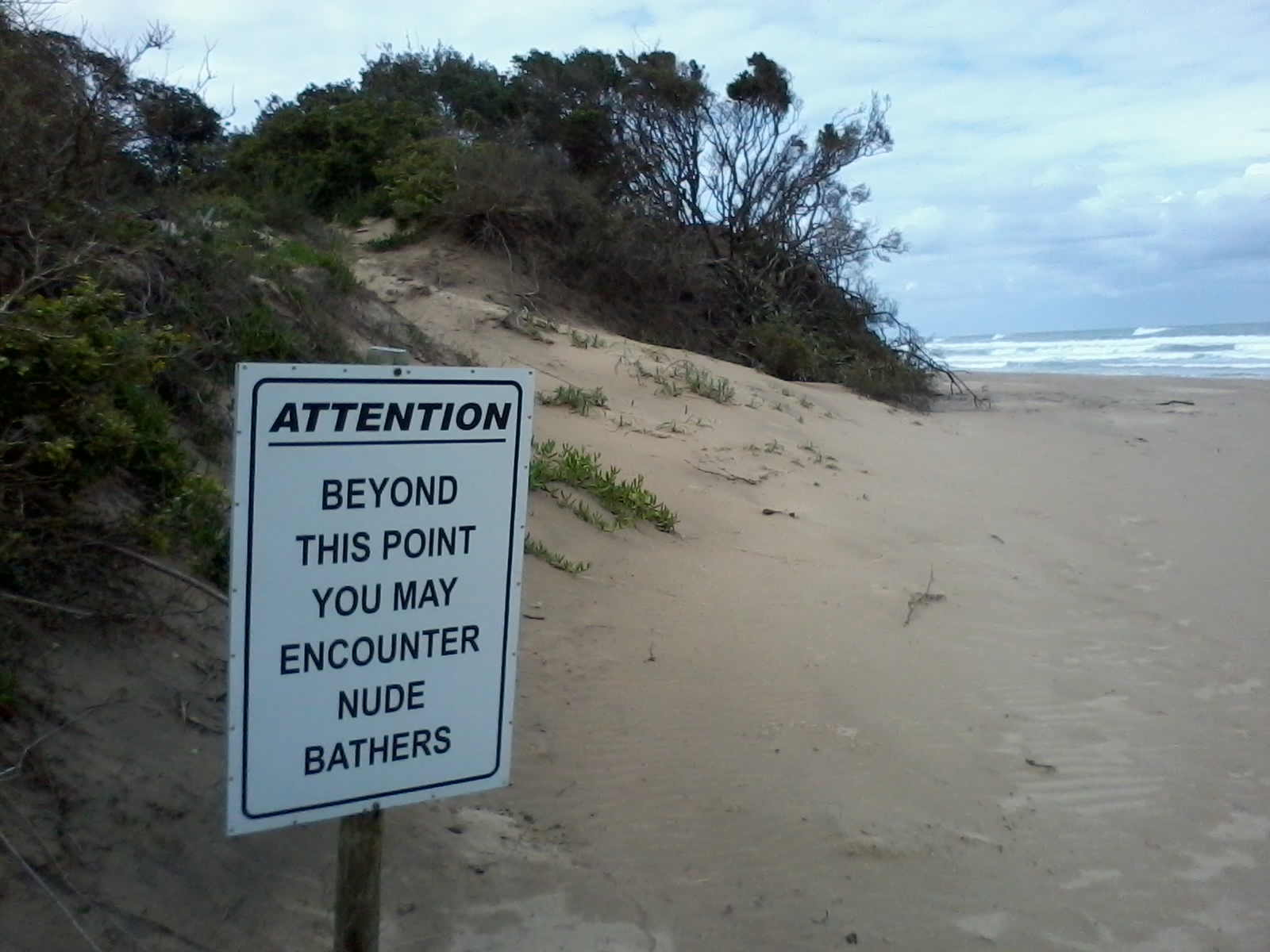
Signpost at Mpenjati Naturist Beach

Mpenjati beach in KwaZulu-Natal province of South Africa has nude-beach status.

== Europe ==
In most European countries, nudity is not explicitly forbidden. Whether it is tolerated on beaches which are not marked as official nudist beaches varies greatly. The only country with substantially different laws is Denmark, where beach nudity is explicitly allowed on all beaches, except for two in the far west of the country.

=== Belgium ===
Organized naturism in Belgium began in 1924 when engineer Joseph-Paul Swenne founded the Belgian League of Heliophilous Propaganda (usually abbreviated to Hélios) in Uccle. This was followed four years later by De Spar, founded by Jozef Geertz and hosted on the country estate of entrepreneur Oswald Johan de Schampelaere. Belgian naturism was influenced in equal part by French naturism and German Freikörperkultur. Belgian naturists are represented by the Federatie van Belgische Naturisten (FBN).

=== Croatia ===
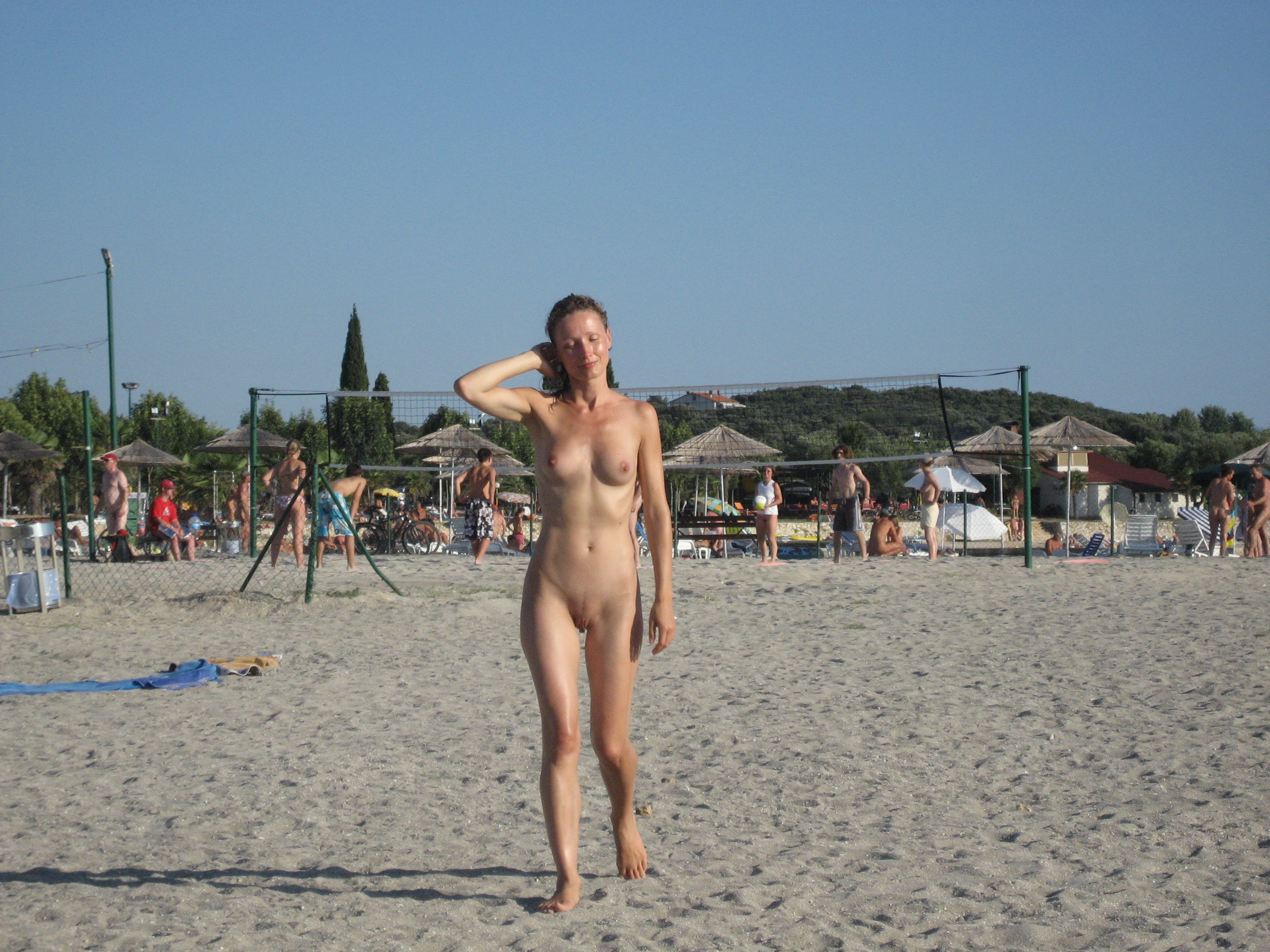
A woman naked on the beach at Valalta, Croatia

Croatia is world famous for naturism, which accounts for about 15% of its tourism industry. It was also the first European country to develop commercial naturist resorts. During a 1936 Adriatic cruise, King Edward VIII and Wallis Simpson stopped at a beach on the island of Rab where King Edward obtained special permission from the local government to swim naked. This event marked the beginning of nudist tourism in Croatia.

=== Finland ===
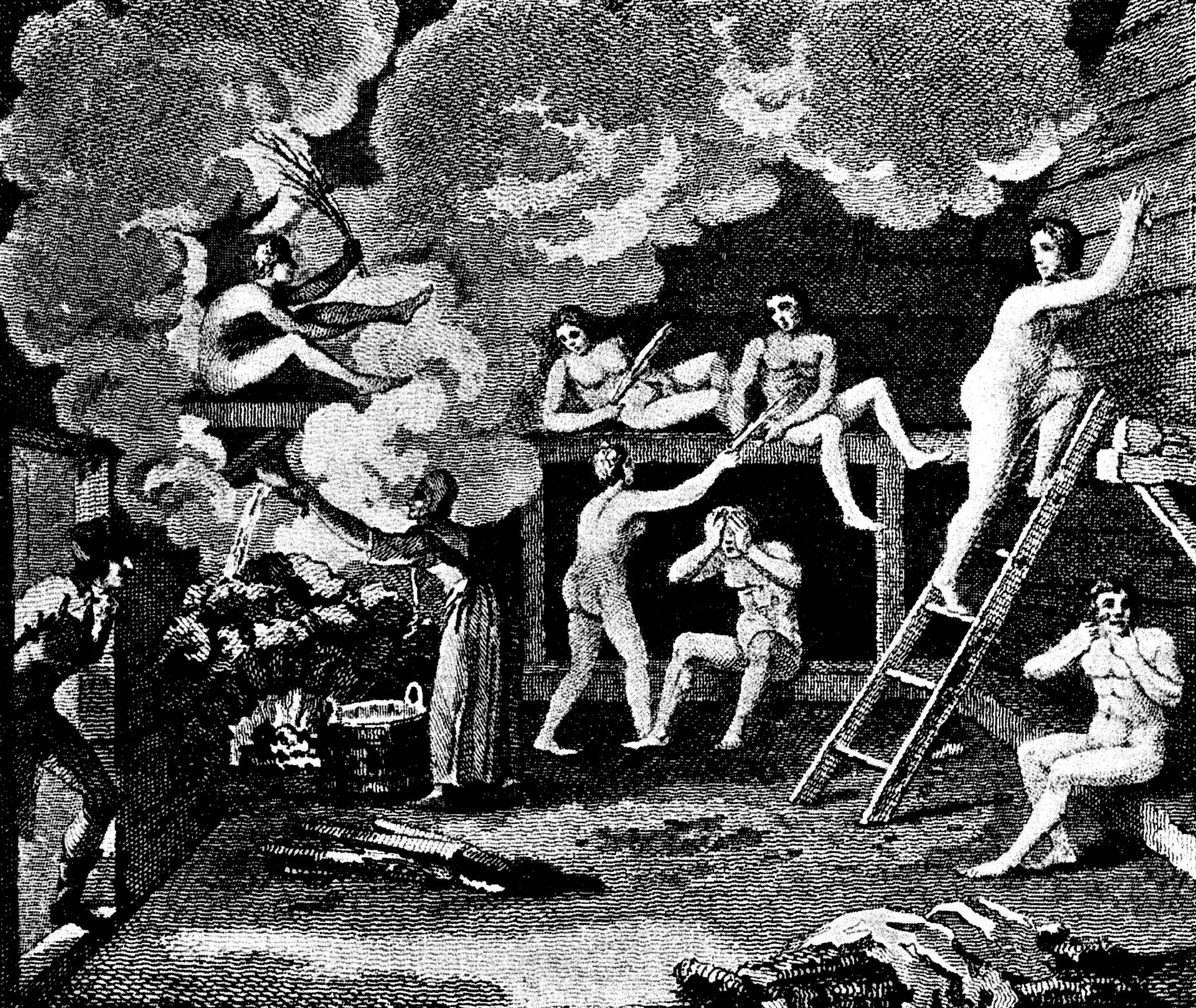
Finnish Sauna (1802)

In Finnish culture, nudism is considered to be a relatively normal way to live. It is not uncommon to see entire families spending time together naked. Families may be naked while bathing, in a sauna, swimming in a pool, or playing on a beach, and it is not unusual to see children playing naked in a family yard for example. Nudity as a whole is considered less taboo than in many other countries.

=== France ===
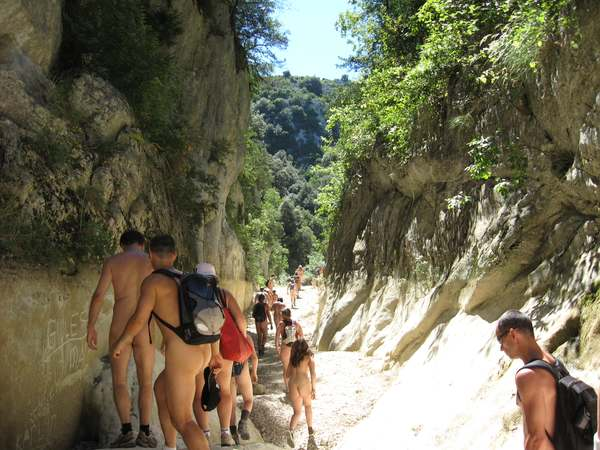
Randonue in Les Concluses, Gard, 2008

Marcel Kienné de Mongeot is credited with starting naturism in France in 1920. His family had suffered from tuberculosis, and he saw naturism as a cure and a continuation of the traditions of the ancient Greeks. In 1926, he started the magazine Vivre intégralement (later titled Vivre) and the first French naturist club, Sparta Club, at Garambouville, near Évreux. The court action that he initiated established that nudism was legal on private property that was fenced and screened.

Drs. André and Gaston Durville bought 70 hectares (170 acres) on the Île du Levant where they established the village of Héliopolis, which was open to the public. In 1925, Dr. François Fougerat de David de Lastours wrote a thesis on heliotherapy, and in that year, he opened the Club gymnique de France. In 1936, the naturist movement was officially recognised.

Albert and Christine Lecocq were active members of many of these clubs, but they left after disagreements, and in 1944, they founded the Club du Soleil with members in 84 cities. Four years later, they founded the Fédération Française de Naturisme (FFN); in 1949, they started the magazine Vie au Soleil, and in 1950, they opened the CHM Montalivet, the world's first naturist holiday centre, where the INF was formed.

Henri Zisly was another prominent figure and primitivist in the French naturism movement who wrote on a return to lifestyles based on self-sufficiency.

=== Germany ===
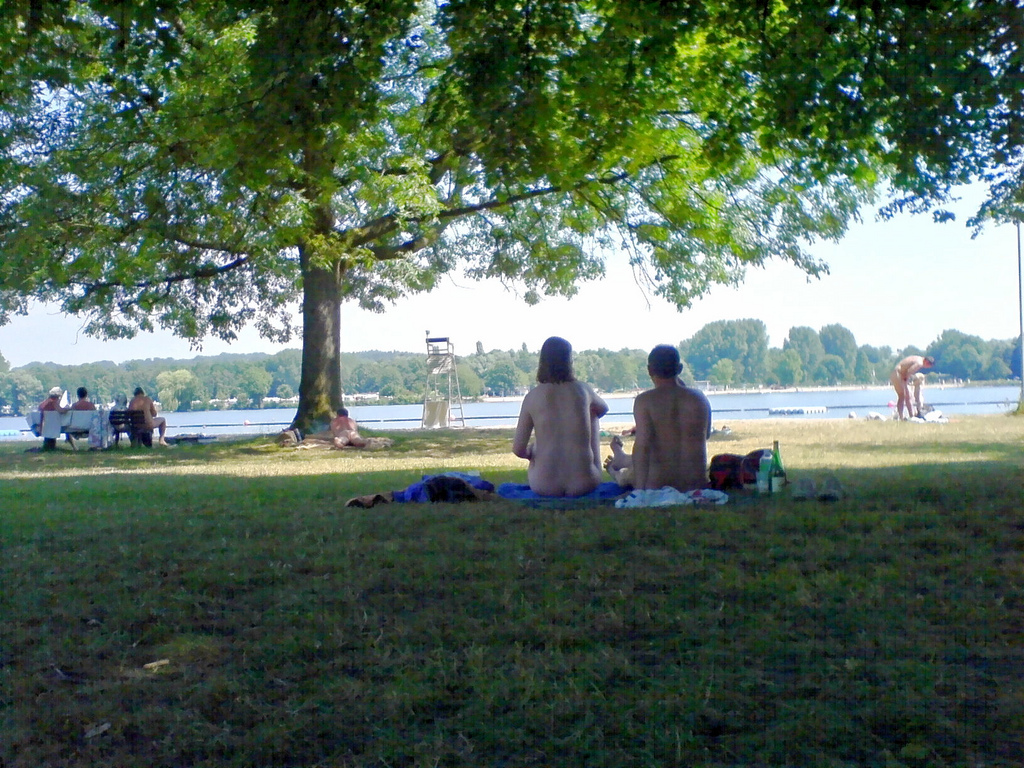
Public naturist recreation area at Lake Unterbach; Strandbad Süd, Düsseldorf-Unterbach, Germany

German naturism (Freikörperkultur, FKK) was part of the Lebensreform movement and the Wandervogel youth movement of 1896, from Steglitz, Berlin, which promoted ideas of fitness and vigour. At the same time, doctors of the Naturheilbewegung (Natural Healing Movement) were using heliotherapy, treating diseases such as tuberculosis, rheumatism, and scrofula with exposure to sunlight.

Nacktkultur, a term coined in 1903 by Heinrich Pudor, connected nudity, vegetarianism and social reform, and was practised in a network of 200 members clubs. The movement gained prominence in the 1920s by offering a health-giving lifestyle with Utopian ideals. Germany published the first naturist journal from 1902 to 1932, but it became politicised by radical socialists who believed it would lead to classlessness and a breakdown of society. It eventually became associated with pacificism.

In 1926, Adolf Koch established a school of naturism in Berlin, encouraging a mixing of the sexes, open air exercises, and a programme of "sexual hygiene". In 1929 the Berlin school hosted the first International Congress on Nudity.

After World War II, East Germans were free to practice naturism, chiefly at beaches rather than clubs (private organizations were regarded as potentially subversive). Naturism became a large element in DDR politics. The Proletarische Freikörperkulturbewegung subsection of the Workers Sports Organisation had 60,000 members. Since reunification there are many clubs, parks and beaches open to naturists, though nudity has become less common in the former eastern zone. Germans are typically the most commonly seen visitors at nude beaches in France and around Europe.

=== Greece ===
There are no official nude beaches, however there are unofficial nude beaches on the islands frequented by tourists, like Crete, Mykonos or Karpathos, and on smaller islands like Skopelos or Skiathos where nudity is tolerated, usually at the more remote ends or secluded areas of beaches.

Toplessness also is widely practiced by locals and tourists alike as there are no cultural taboos against it.

In 2015, a court in Thessaloniki, Greece's second largest city, acquitted nudist activists who were charged for wandering naked in the city as part of their activist actions for promoting the urban nudism. In its ruling, the court deemed these acts to be "not lewd or lascivious", and vindicated the activists, thus recognizing their right to be naked publicly.

=== Hungary ===
Naturism is legal at official naturist resorts in Hungary; in other places, full nudity and toplessness generally prohibited. According to the rising social demand the first official naturist beach of Hungary was opened at the lakes of Délegyháza in 1983 and an association was built up Magyar Naturisták Egyesülete (in English: Hungarian Naturist Association). In 1987 an other naturist resort had benn opened the Sziksósfürdő Naturist Beach and Camping at a lake, next to Kiskundorozsma. The third famous naturist resort was opened at 2000, the Camping Naturist Berény That belongs to the Naturisták Berényi Baráti Körének Egyesülete (in English: Association of the Berényi Circle of Naturist Friends). It is located at the bank of Lake Balaton, next to Balatonberény. These three places are on continuously from their beginning and are still in service there are other smaller naturist places.

Next to them numerous spas organize so called non-textile sauna programs (in Hungary generally the saunas are visited in swimsuit) for example at Szent Lukács Bath. Many cases there are days when the whole spa (offering these sauna programs) also became a temporal naturist resort (for example the spa of Szentes) These occasions are more frequent at the non-Summer seasons helping to spread the original (Finnish, or German) use of saunas in Hungary and have more people to try naturism.

=== Italy ===
Full nudity is allowed in Italy in the official naturist beaches and places of the country, and in many other places where there is an established tradition of naturist attendance, as confirmed by a recent absolution sentence. In all other public places, full nudity is generally prohibited by civil law and could be punished with fines that have been recently reduced (minimum €51 to maximum €309). In the last decades, six regions have created laws to promote naturist tourism, and actually there are more than 20 official naturist beaches in Italy, where naturism is recognised and guaranteed by administrative acts, and more than 30 beaches with a long tradition of naturist attendance where nudity is accepted. Naturist accommodations are located in most of the regions and it is estimated that the number of nudists and naturists in Italy is about 500,000 people. Since the 1960s, there have been naturist associations in many regions, and a naturist federation on a national level.

Female toplessness is allowed, in a nonsexual context, in all the beaches of the country. On March 20, 2000, the Supreme Court of Cassation through sentence No. 3557 has determined that the exposure of the nude female breast since some decades is considered a "commonly accepted behavior" and therefore has "entered into the social custom". Since then, local government regulations forbidding toplessness are extremely rare.

=== Netherlands ===
The oldest Dutch naturist association is Zon en Leven ('Sun and Life'), founded in 1946 with the aim of promoting healthy physical and mental development and a natural way of life. The national association is Naturisten Federatie Nederland (NFN), which in 2017 adopted the name Bloot Gewoon! ('Simply Naked') in an effort to become more accessible to casual naturists and strengthen the acceptance of nude recreation.

In general, Dutch people are very tolerant of beach nudity, as long as it does not impact others, or involve inappropriate staring or sexual behaviour. Topless sunbathing is permitted on most beaches except where prohibited by signage.

=== Portugal ===
The Federação Portuguesa de Naturismo (Portuguese Naturist Federation) or FPN was founded on 1 March 1977 in Lisbon. In the 21st century, naturism is considered a tolerated practice, whereas there are many officially designated nudist beaches.

=== Poland ===
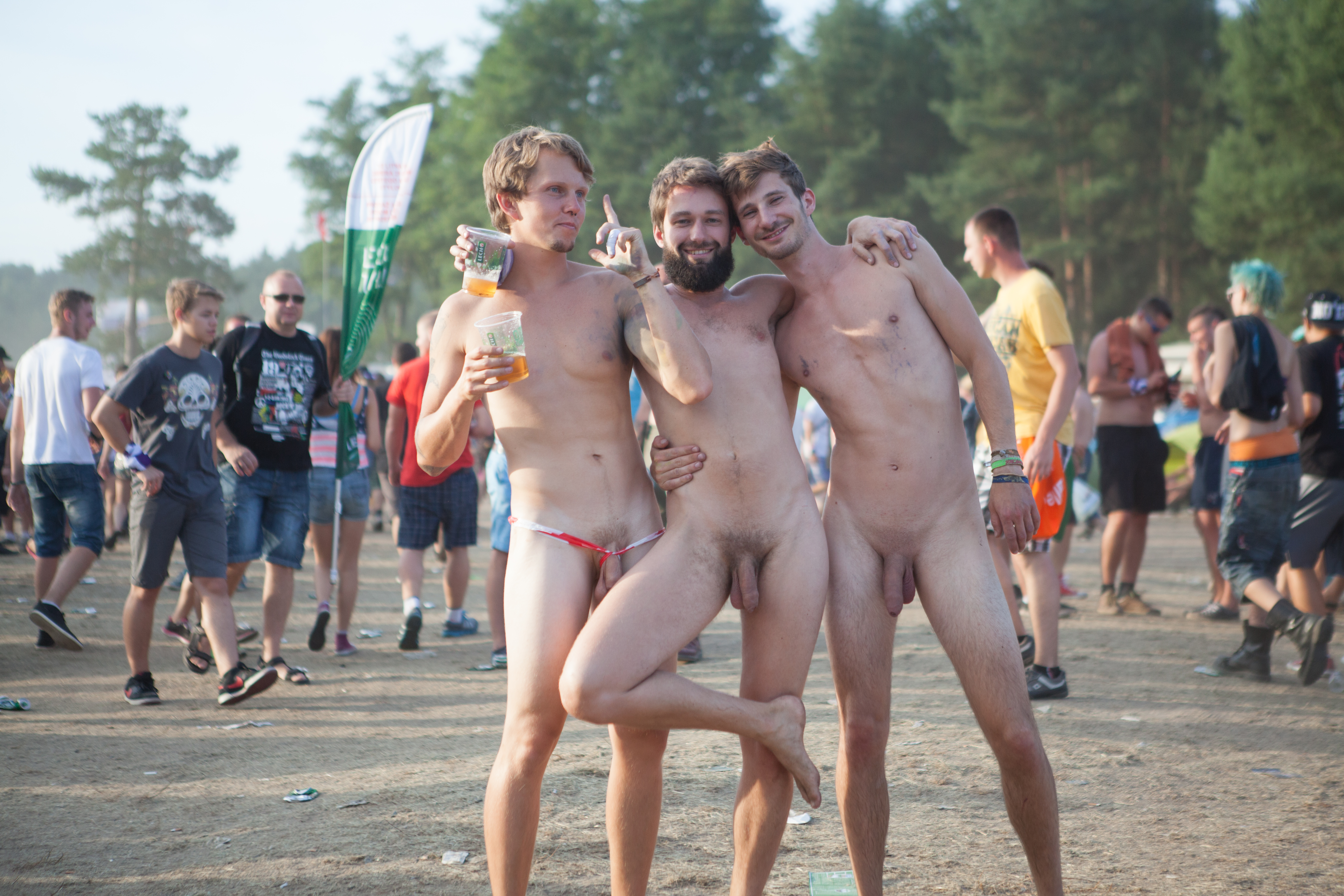
Nude men at the Przystanek Woodstock festival, 2014

In modern-day Poland, naturism is practiced in a number of seaside and inland beaches. Most Polish beaches of this type are actually clothing-optional rather than naturist. One such beach is Międzyzdroje-Lubiewo.

=== Spain ===
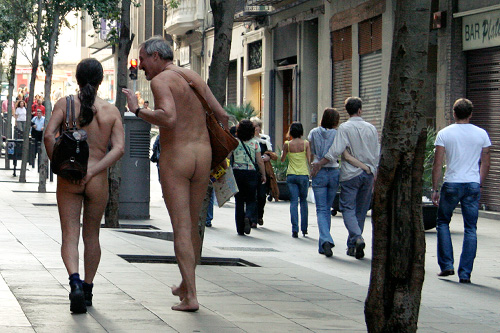
Couple walking naked in the streets of Barcelona, Spain

Public nudity in Spain is not illegal since there is no law banning its practice. Spanish legislation foresees felony for exhibitionism but restricts its scope to obscene exposure in front of children or mentally impaired individuals, i.e. with sexual connotation. There are, however, some municipalities (like San Pedro del Pinatar) where public nudity has been banned by means of by-laws. Other municipalities (like Barcelona, Salou, Platja de Palma and Sant Antoni de Portmany) have used similar provisions to regulate partial nudity, requiring people to cover their torsos on the streets. Some naturist associations have appealed these by-laws on the grounds that a fundamental right (freedom of expression, as they understand nudism to be self-expression) cannot be regulated with such a mechanism. Some courts have ruled in favour of nudist associations. Nudism in Spain is normally practised by the seaside, on beaches or small coves with a tradition of naturism. In Vera, Spain, there is a wide residential area formed by nudist urbanisations. Nudist organisations may organise some activities elsewhere in inner territory.

Research was done on the island of Menorca, where naturism is practiced at small, isolated beaches apart from the island's developed resorts. Not everyone on these beaches, even within a group, is nude, and both types of participants were interviewed. Most were white heterosexuals between the ages of 25 and 40 who live in cities such as Madrid or Barcelona. For them, being nude on a beach is about bodily sensations of sun, sea, and sand directly on the skin, not about cultural meanings or performance of bodily appearance. The behaviors that support the non-sexual definition of the situation work by downplaying the visual, most of all by not staring at others. It is also unacceptable for a person to actively seek the gaze of others. Naturists may see the decision not to be nude is holding on to the visual, and non-naturists may see beach nudity as a form of exhibitionism.

Legal provisions regarding partial nudity (or toplessness) are analogous to those regarding full nudity, but social tolerance towards toplessness is higher. The law does not require women to cover their breasts in public swimming, or on any beach in Spain. The governments of the municipalities of Galdakao and L'Ametlla del Vallès legalized female toplessness on their public pools in March 2016 and June 2018, respectively.

Naturists were a prominent affinity group among Spanish anarcho-syndicalists.

=== United Kingdom ===
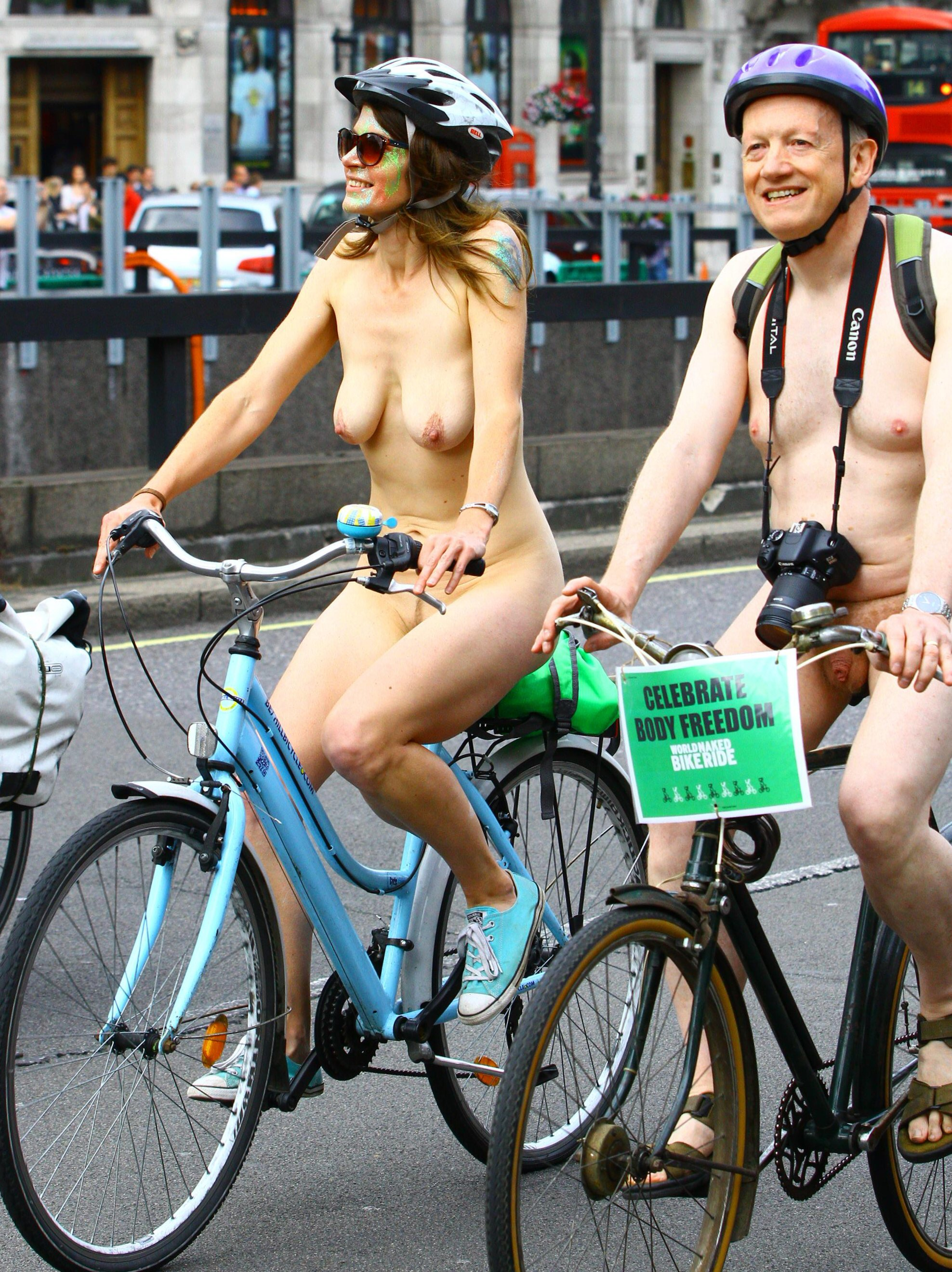
World Naked Bike Ride in London, 2016

In the United Kingdom, the first official nudist club was established in Wickford, Essex, in 1924. According to Michael Farrar, writing for British Naturism, the club adopted the name "Moonella Group" from the name of the owner of the ground and called its site The Camp. Moonella, who was still living in 1965 but whose identity remains to be discovered, had inherited a house with land in 1923 and made it available to certain members of the New Gymnosophy Society. This society was founded a few years before by H.C. Booth, M.H. Sorensen and Rex Wellbye under the name of the English Gymnosophical Society. It met for discussions at the Minerva Cafe at 144 High Holborn in London, the headquarters of the Women's Freedom League. Those who were permitted to join the Moonella Group were carefully selected, and the club was run by a leadership of the original members, all of whom had club names to preserve their anonymity. The club closed in 1926 because of construction on adjacent land.

By 1943, there were a number of "sun clubs", and together they formed the British Sun Bathers Association, or BSBA. In 1954, a group of clubs unhappy with the way the BSBA was being run, split to form the Federation of British Sun Clubs, or FBSC. In 1961, the BSBA Annual Conference agreed that the term nudist was inappropriate and should be discarded in favour of naturist. The two organisations rivalled each other before eventually coming together again in 1964 as the Central Council for British Naturism, or CCBN. This organisational structure has remained much the same but as of 2011 it is called British Naturism or BN.

The first official nude beach was opened at Fairlight Glen in Covehurst Bay near Hastings in 1978 (not to be confused with Fairlight Cove, which is 2 kilometres (1.2 mi) to the east), followed later by the beaches at Brighton and Fraisthorpe. Bridlington opened in April 1980.

== Oceania ==
=== Australia ===
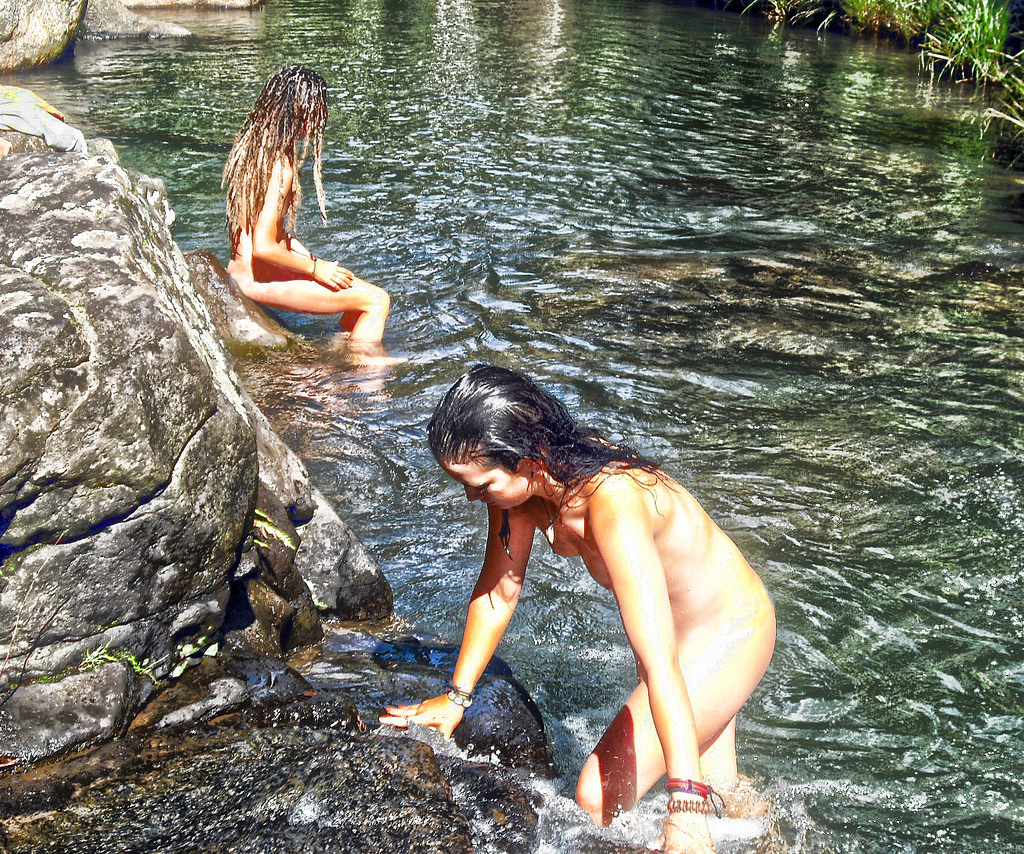
Naturist swimmers in Australia

Australia's first naturist club was founded in Sydney in 1931 by the French-born anarchist and pacifist Kleber Claux. In 1975, the southern half of Maslin Beach, south of Adelaide, was declared Australia's first official nude beach. The beach is almost 3 kilometres (1.9 miles) long, so the area reserved for nude bathing is away from other beach users.

Also in South Australia, Sunland nudist holiday village was established in 1974, on 100 hectares (250 acres) of beachfront property on the south coast, near the town of Robe, South Australia.

The Australian Naturist Federation (ANF) represents naturists in Australia. Many naturist clubs, resorts and other organisations are Affiliate members of the ANF. Individual membership is also available to naturists who wish to support the organisation, and have access to member-only online events and forums.

Queensland Naturist Association (QNA) is a non-profit advocacy group committed to fostering positive changes in clothing-optional recreation in Queensland, Australia. QNA organises naturist events, such as parties and nude cruises.

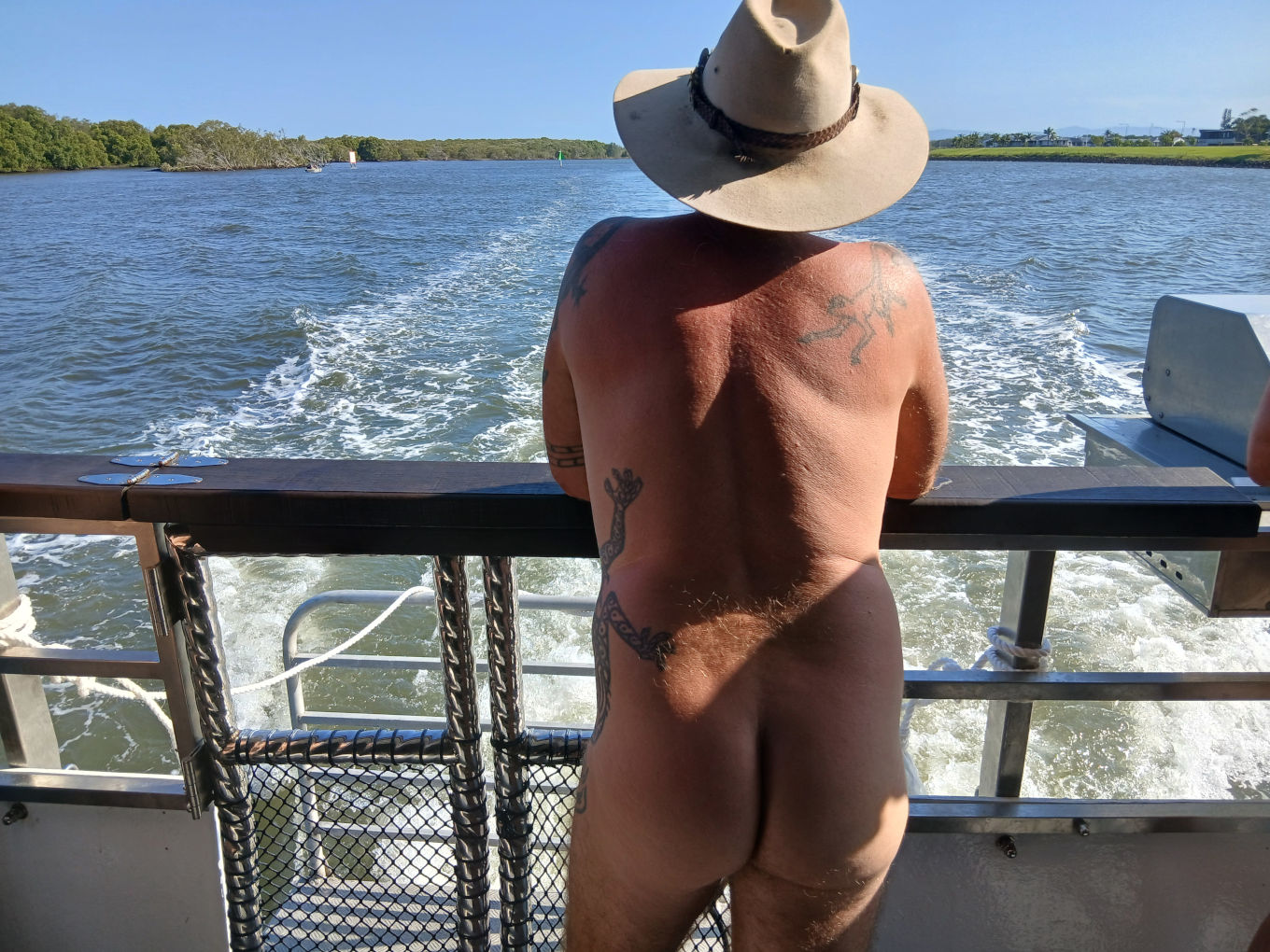
Naked person looking over the stern rail on the QNA nude boat cruise on the Gold Coast Broadwater, Queensland, in December 2025

=== New Zealand ===
Nudist clubs (called sun clubs) were established in Dunedin and Auckland in early 1938; the Auckland Sun Group went into recess shortly afterwards due to the outbreak of World War II. In 1958 the allied nudist clubs of New Zealand established the New Zealand Sunbathing Association, later renamed the New Zealand Naturist Federation. The Federation includes 17 affiliated clubs with a total membership (in 2012) of 1,600 people. In 2016 the Federation, in conjunction with Tourism New Zealand, hosted the World Congress of the International Naturist Federation at the Wellington Naturist Club, marking the second time the Congress had ever been held in the Southern Hemisphere.

Outside formal naturist organizations, social nudity is practised in a variety of contexts in New Zealand culture. It is a feature of many summer music festivals, including Convergence, Kiwiburn, Luminate, Rhythm & Vines, and Splore, in a tradition going back to Nambassa in the late 1970s. It is also associated with the culture of rugby, most prominently in the nude rugby match held in Dunedin each winter from 2002 to 2014 (and sporadically thereafter) as pre-match entertainment for the first professional rugby game of the season, and in the mock public holiday "National Nude Day", an event in which viewers of the talk show SportsCafe were invited – chiefly by former rugby player Marc Ellis, the show's most irrepressibly comic presenter – to send in photos and video of themselves performing daily activities in the nude.

While a large proportion of New Zealanders are tolerant of nudity, especially on beaches, there remains a contingent who consider it obscene. Naturists who engage in casual public nudity, even in places where this is lawful, risk being reported to police by disapproving people. Legally, nudity is permissible on any beach where it is "known to occur", in consequence of which New Zealand has no official nude beaches. The indecent exposure provision of the Summary Offences Act is, in practice, reserved for cases of public sexual gratification, but public nudity may still be prosecuted under the "offensive behaviour" provision.

== North America ==
=== Canada ===
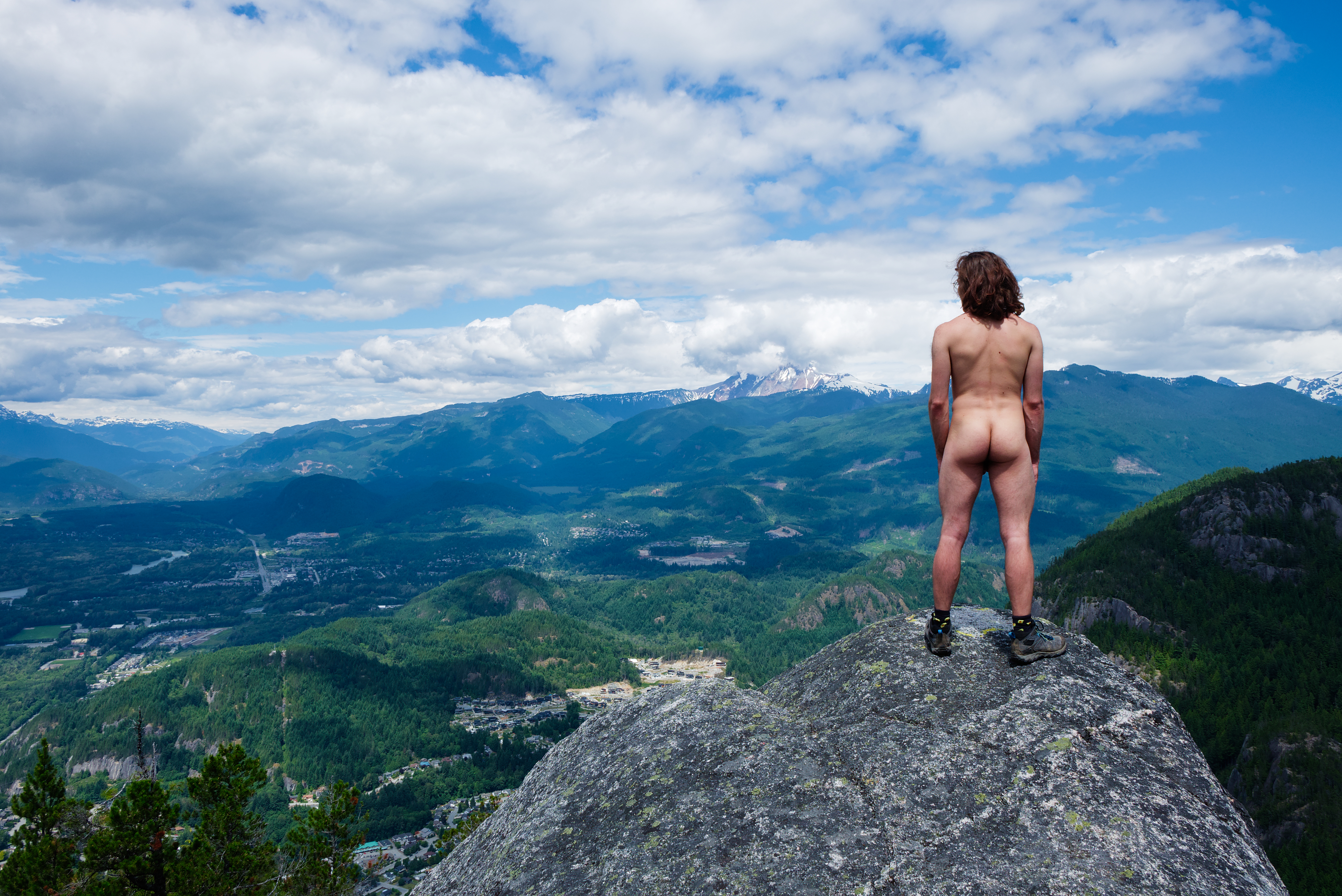
Nudist hiker in British Columbia

In Canada, individuals around the country became interested in nudism, skinny-dipping, and physical culture in the early part of the 20th century. Sunbathing & Health, a magazine targeted toward Canadian naturists and which occasionally carried local news, began publication after 1940. There were scattered groups of naturists in several cities during the 1930s and 1940s, and some of these groups attracted enough interest to form clubs on private land. The most significant clubs were the Van Tan Club, formed in 1939, which is still operating in North Vancouver, BC, and the Sun Air Club, in Ontario.

Canadians who served in the military during the Second World War met like-minded souls from across the country, and often visited clubs while in Europe. They were a ready pool of recruits for post-war organizers. A few years later, the wave of post-war immigration brought many Europeans with their own extensive experience, and they not only swelled the ranks of membership, but often formed their own clubs, helping to expand nudism from coast to coast.

Most clubs eventually united in the Canadian Sunbathing Association, which affiliated with the American Sunbathing Association in 1954. Several disagreements between eastern and western members of the CSA resulted in its division into the Western Canadian Sunbathing Association (WCSA) and the Eastern Canadian Sunbathing Association (ECSA) in 1960. The ECSA endured much in-fighting over the next fifteen years, which led to its official demise in 1978. The WCSA changed its name to the American Association for Nude Recreation – Western Canadian Region, a region of the American Association for Nude Recreation (AANR), which itself was formerly known as the ASA.

In 1977 the Fédération québécoise de naturisme (FQN) was founded in Quebec by Michel Vaïs, who had experienced European naturism at Montalivet. In 1985 the Federation of Canadian Naturists (FCN) was formed with the support of the FQN. In 1988 the FQN and FCN formed the FQN-FCN Union as the official Canadian representative in the International Naturist Federation.

=== Cuba ===
Naturism was a major component of the Cuban anarchist movement, alongside anarchist communism and anarcho-syndicalism, as an alternative health and lifestyle movement. Adrián del Valle in particular advocated for the emancipatory" function of naturism in a society.

=== Mexico ===
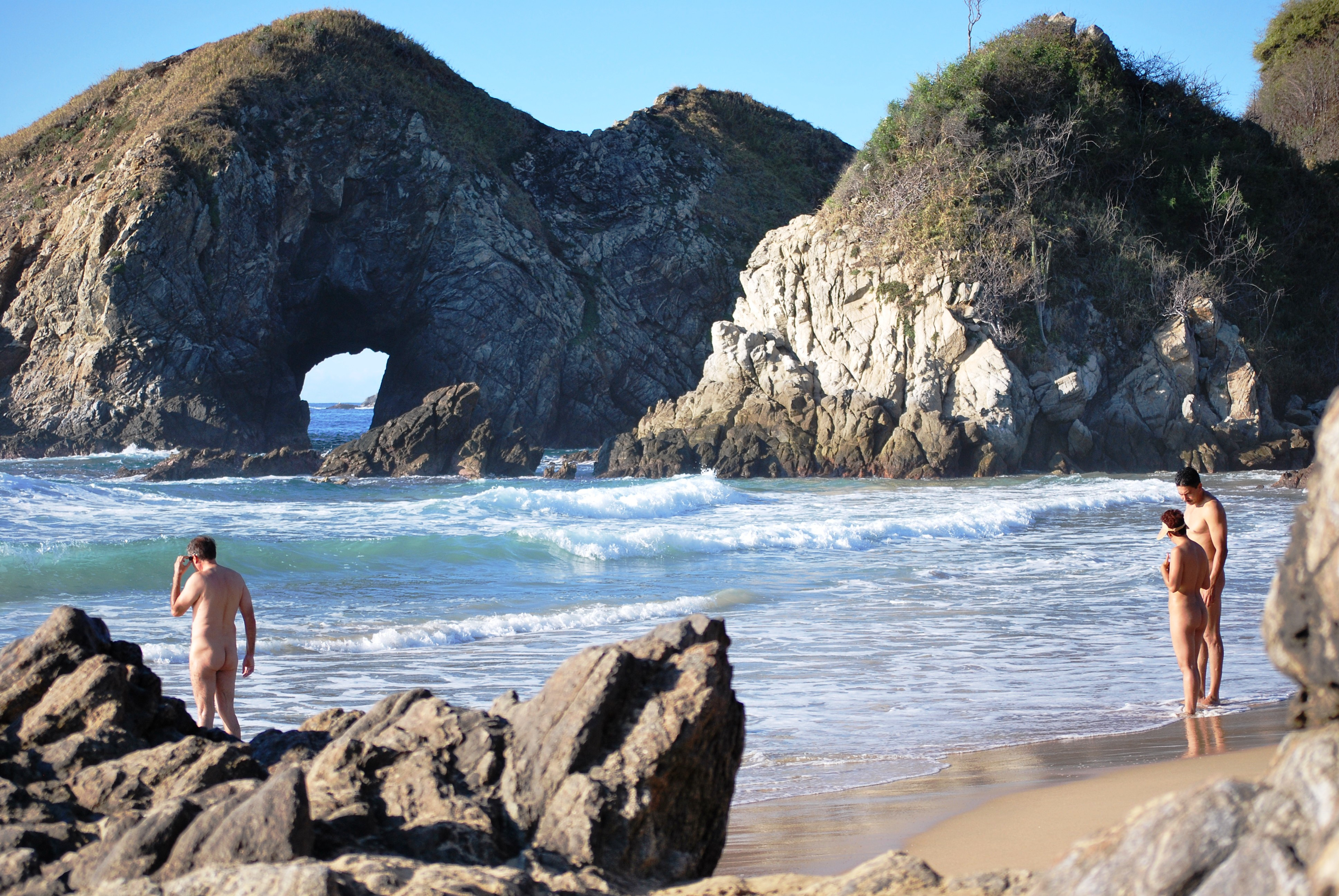
The far west end of Zipolite Beach, Oaxaca, Mexico

Federación Nudista de México is a members organization with both individual and organization members. It promotes social nudity in Mexico, and it is recognized by the International Naturist Federation as the official national naturist organization in that country.

As of 2016, Playa Zipolite is Mexico's first and only legal public nude beach. A free beach and unofficially nudist for more than 50 years, this beach is reputed to be the best place for nudism in the country. The numerous nude sunbathers, and the long tradition, make it safe for nudism and naturism. Annually since 2016, on the first weekend of February, Zipolite has hosted Festival Nudista Zipolite that in 2019 attracted 7,000–8,000 visitors.

=== United States ===
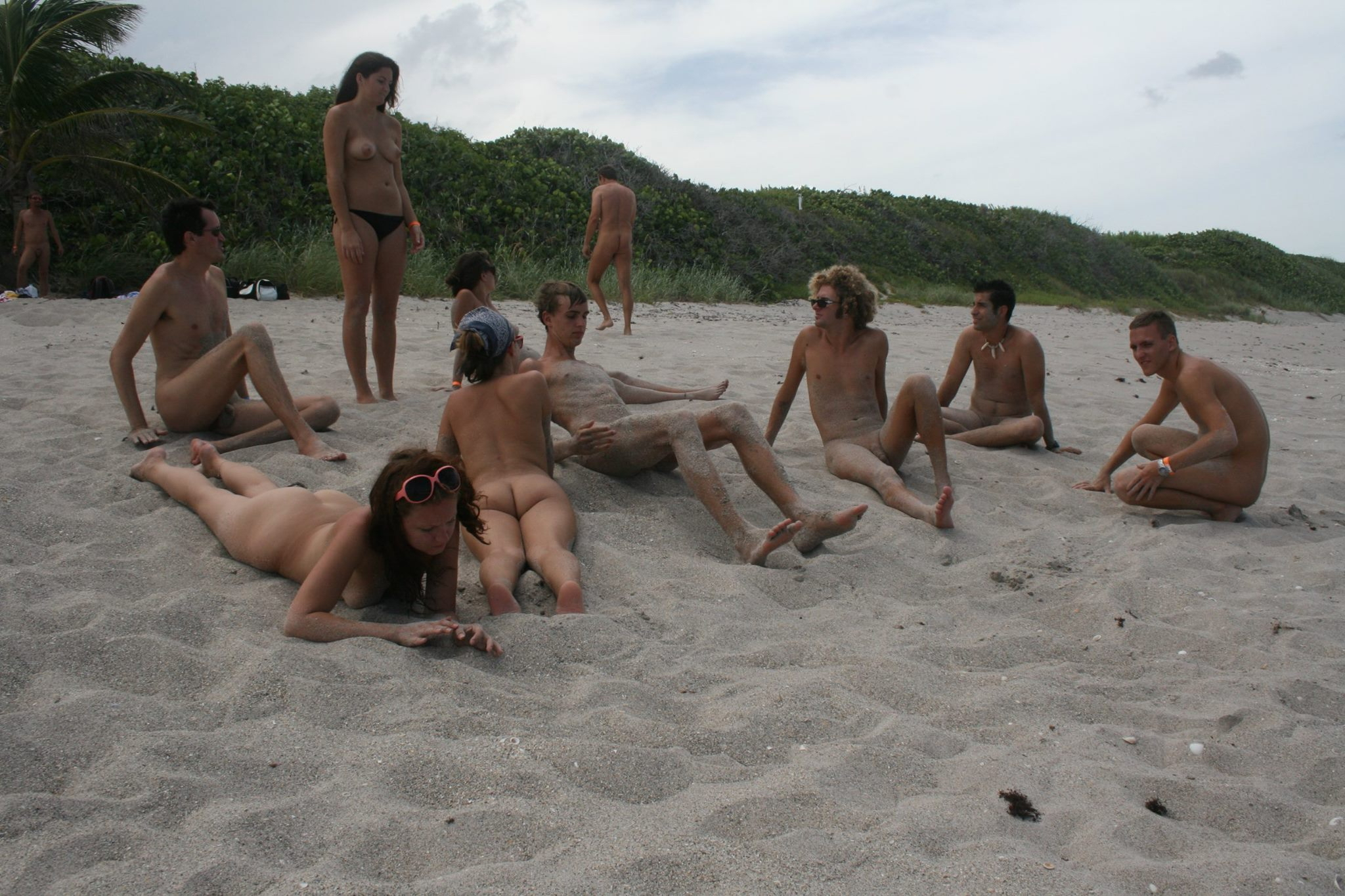
Florida naturists

Kurt Barthel founded the American League for Physical Culture in 1929 and organized the first nudist event. In about 1930 they organized the American Gymnosophical Association. Barthel founded America's first official nudist camp, Sky Farm in New Jersey, in May, 1932. Around 1932, the AGA established the Rock Lodge Club as a nudist facility in Stockholm, New Jersey and Ilsley Boone, a Dutch Reformed minister, formed the Christian naturism movement. Naturism began to expand nationwide.

The American Association for Nude Recreation (AANR) is the national naturist organization. Arnd Krüger compared nudists in Germany and the United States and came to the conclusion that in Germany the racial aspects (Zuchtwahl) were important for the breakthrough (e.g. the Commanding General of the Army served as patron for nudists events), while in the U.S. nudism was far more commercial and had thus more difficulties.

In 2008, Florida Young Naturists held its first Naked Bash, which has been repeated multiple times per year and has grown into one of the larger young naturist gatherings in the world.

In 2009, a campaign to promote nudism in the United States occurred with an effort by the AANR to record the largest simultaneous skinny dip at several U.S. clubs and beaches, which occurred on July 11 of that year.

In 2010, an organization formed called Young Naturists America, which was mostly focused on the younger generation, as well as social issues, such as body image. Young Naturists and Nudists America closed in 2017.

== Asia ==
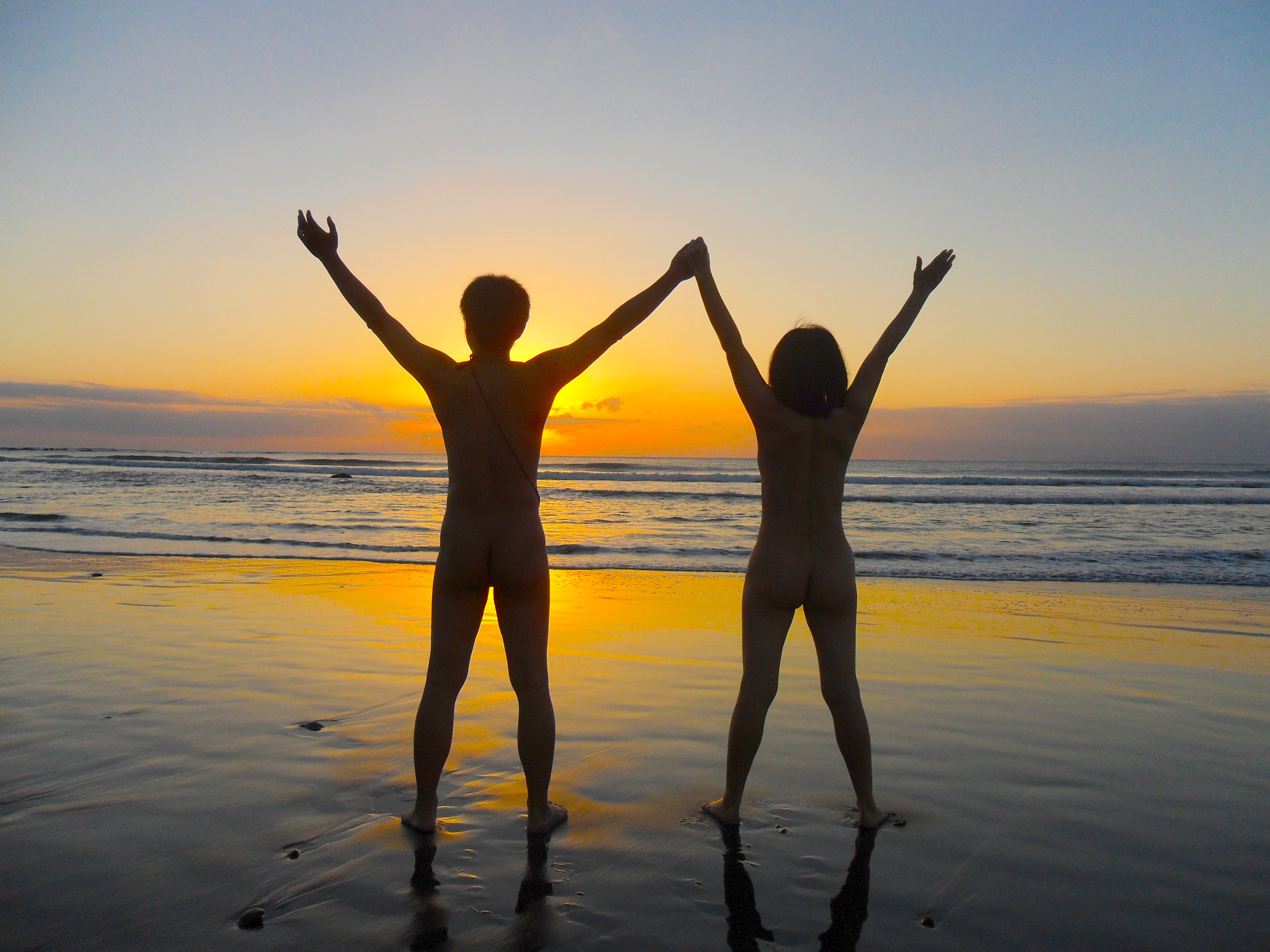
Sunrise on the beach, Taitung County, Taiwan

=== Indonesia ===
In the 1970s, nudity on Bali's remote and deserted beaches was common, but with the massive growth of tourism this practice has disappeared. In 2002, nudity was declared illegal on Petitenget Beach, the last beach in Seminyak that tolerated discreet nudity. Individuals began to practice nudity in private villas and resorts. Laki Uma Villa, the first naturist facility to open, was for gay men only. Bali au Naturel, the first adult-only nudist resort for both genders, opened its doors in 2004. It subsequently expanded from 3 to 15 rooms and added two more swimming pools.

Indonesia has an underground naturist community who defy the laws against public nudity.

=== Israel ===
In Israel, public nudity is prohibited, and there are no officially recognized public naturist venues, but naturism is practiced in private places. The Israeli Naturist Society is the official naturist organization as of 2000, and is affiliated to the International Naturist Federation. There are several locations where naturism is practiced: one in the Tel Baruch area north of Tel Aviv, one south of Ashkelon, one at Ga'ash near Netanya, and one near Metzoke Dragot on the Dead Sea.

=== Thailand ===
Nudism was introduced in 2012 by The Thailand Naturist Association in Pattaya (Chan Resort), and five more nudist resorts have been created across Thailand: Barefeet Resort in Bangkok, Lemon Tree Resort in Phuket City, Oriental Village in Chiangmai, Phuan Naturist Village in Pattaya, and Peace Blue Naturist Resort in Phuket.

Since 2020 during the worldwide pandemic, Lemon Tree Resort in Phuket, Oriental Village in Chiangmai, and Phuan Naturist Village in Pattaya have closed.

Dragonfly Naturist Village in Pattaya (a member of American Association for Nude Recreation) has opened and expanded its property as the largest naturist resort in Thailand.

== South America ==
=== Argentina ===
Naturism is allowed in the official nude beaches of Puerto Escondido, located near Miramar, and Playa Querandí, located in Villa Gesell. Total nudity is permitted in some private naturist resorts.

=== Brazil ===
In general, public nudity tends to be condemned by the Brazilian authorities, which commonly see it as indecent exposure. However, the country has the highest number of official nude beaches in Latin America, being eight in total, and this number partially is explained by the fact that the Brazilian territory has more than 8,000 kilometres (5,000 mi) of ocean coast. Moreover, there are a few private naturist clubs throughout the country where full nudity is accepted as well. Naturism in Brazil is regulated by the Brazilian Naturism Federation (in Portuguese: Federação Brasileira de Naturismo, abbreviated as FBrN).

=== Chile ===
The first nude beach in the country, called Playa Luna, was legalized in 2000, and there are unofficial restricted areas that were created in Playa Luna Norte (Tarapacá), Playa Luna Sur (Coliumo), Playa Escondida (Antofagasta), Playa Blanca (Tongoy) and Pichilemu.

=== Uruguay ===
There are two official nude beaches where the practice of naturism is allowed: Chihuahua, located in the resort of the same name, and La Sirena, located in the resort of Aguas Dulces.

== Naturist media ==
=== Magazines ===
Magazines published by, for or purportedly about naturists can be grouped into the following:

- Magazines published by an "official" national organisation, such as BN (British Naturism), Going Natural/Au naturel (FCN/FQN), Nude & Natural Magazine (The Naturist Society), gonatural (New Zealand Naturist Federation).
- Independent magazines published for naturists, such as Naturally, H&E naturist and TAN (acronym of The Australian Naturist).
- Magazines that print photographs only or primarily of young female professional models. These types of publications are disapproved of by many naturists and non-naturists alike.

Magazines in the second and, occasionally, third groups feature naturist editorial and advertising. While some naturists argue over which magazines belong in which of these categories, these views may change as publishers and editors change. Many clubs and groups have benefited from magazines which, while not exclusively or even predominantly naturist in character, made naturist information available to many who would not otherwise have been aware of it. The information and advertising provided online, along with the wide availability of free online pornography, has meant the disappearance of old-style "skin" magazines presenting significant glamour content masquerading as, or alongside, naturist content. Naturist magazines have to appeal strongly to naturists to succeed; they cannot sit on the fence between naturism and glamour. Some naturists feel that the worthwhile editorial content in some magazines is not a fair balance for the disapproved-of photographic content.

=== Digital media ===
Since the early 21st century, digital media have become an increasingly important part of naturist communication. In addition to traditional magazines, naturist organisations and independent publishers use websites, newsletters and social media to share information about naturist philosophy, body acceptance, events, travel and everyday practice. These digital channels complement traditional print publications by reaching broader audiences and facilitating communication within the naturist community.

=== Photography, films and videos ===
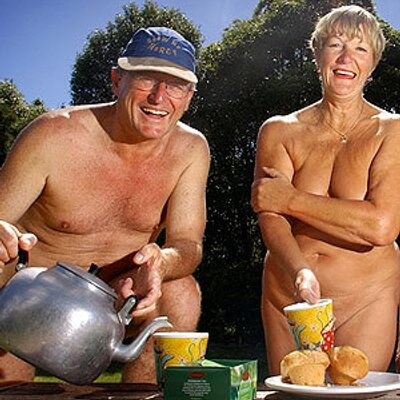
A publicity photo showing a North American naturist couple making tea

Although photographing others when they are nude in a public place may not violate their rights to privacy, individuals retain the personality rights to their own image in many countries. If so, recognizable photographs of any person cannot be published without permission.

Some naturist clubs have been willing to allow filming by the media on their grounds, though content that proved not to be of genuine naturism can end up being parodied by the media.

Some commercial 'naturist' DVDs are dominated by imagery of naked children. Such material can be marketed in ways that appear to appeal directly to pedophile inclinations, and ownership of these DVDs (and their earlier video cassette incarnations) has resulted in successful British prosecutions for possession of indecent images of children. One case was appealed, unsuccessfully, to the European Court of Human Rights.

Photo shoots, including major high-profile works by Spencer Tunick, are done in public places including beaches.

== See also ==
- Breastfeeding in public
- List of places where social nudity is practised
- List of social nudity organizations
- Naked party
- Streaking
- Timeline of non-sexual social nudity
- Topfreedom
- Hadaka Matsuri
