= Wellington Naturist Club =

Naturist resort in New Zealand

Coordinates: 41°05′34″S 175°08′03″E

The Wellington Naturist Club is a naturist resort located in Te Mārua, Upper Hutt, 38 kilometres (24 mi) northeast of Wellington in the North Island of New Zealand. Its 4.7 hectares (12 acres) of land hold facilities including a miniature golf course, volleyball court, picnic areas, spa and sauna, and extensive rhododendron gardens, with a large hall for a clubhouse. For accommodation, the resort has four lodges and over 150 campsites. The Club was founded in 1950, under the name "Wellington Sun and Health Society".

== Community events ==
The Wellington Naturist Club opens its gates to the public on one weekend each summer, and periodically hosts the New Zealand Naturist Federation (NZNF)'s annual national rally. The Club regularly celebrates World Naked Gardening Day in May, but has also helped launch a National Nude Gardening Day in October, as May is a cold month in New Zealand. The Club's grounds have also been used as a wedding venue.

== 2016 INF World Congress ==
In November 2016, following lobbying by the NZNF in conjunction with Tourism New Zealand, the Club was the venue for the World Congress of the International Naturist Federation (INF), marking the second time the Congress had ever been held in the Southern Hemisphere. This Congress was marked by political unrest, as sitting INF president Sieglinde Ivo was voted out in favour of French delegate Armand Jamier by a narrow majority led by British Naturism delegates. The vote was overturned and Ivo returned to the presidency at a special World Congress in 2017, held in Vienna.
