= Federation of Canadian Naturists =

Naturist organization representing English-speaking Canadians

The Federation of Canadian Naturists (FCN) is the official International Naturist Federation (INF) representative for English-speaking Canada. It was founded in 1986, and has been reported to have 1,300 members.

It publishes a quarterly magazine called Going Natural/Au naturel, which had a circulation of 900 in 2023.

Because the INF only recognizes one naturist organization per country, the FCN shares its membership with the Federation of Quebec de Naturists (FQN) (founded 1978). Together, the FCN and FQN form the FQN-FCN Union for the purpose of joint membership in the INF.

== See also ==
- Naturism
- List of social nudity organizations
