= Young Naturists America =

Defunct naturist company

Young Naturists America (YNA) was a New York-based naturist company for young adults. It was founded in 2010 and closed in 2017.

YNA focused mostly on the 21-to-35 age demographic. Company-sponsored activities included nude parties and events at resorts and night clubs.

YNA closed and ended its activities by the end of 2017.
