= Wreck of Rochelongue =

Ancient shipwreck in southwestern France

The shipwreck of Rochelongue, located west of Cap d'Agde in southwestern France, dates to the Iron Age, c. 600 BC. Its cargo included 800 kilograms (1,800 lb) of copper ingots and about 1,700 bronze artefacts, including axe heads, other tools, and chains. The ingots have been analyzed by the SAM Project, and found to contain very pure copper with traces of lead, antimony, nickel and silver.

The artefacts are on display in the Agde Museum, which also houses the Youth of Agde, a Hellenistic statue recovered from the river Herault (where it was probably deposited by a different, later shipwreck).
