= Julien Pontgerard =

Singaporean footballer (born 1997)

Personal information
- Date of birth: 4 May 1997 (age 29)
- Place of birth: France
- Position: Striker

Senior career*
Years	Team	Apps	(Gls)
–2021	AS Brest		
2021–2022	AS Guilers		
2022–	AS Brest		

International career
2024–	Madagascar		
- * Club domestic league appearances and goals

Julien Pontgerard (born 4 May 1997) is a footballer who plays as a striker for Régional 2 club AS Brest. Born in France, he is a Madagascar international.

== Early life ==
Pontgerard was born in 1997 in France. He is a native of Cap d'Agde.

== Career ==
Pontergard is a Madagascar international. He was first called up to the Madagascar national football team for 2026 FIFA World Cup qualification.

== Style of play ==
Pontergard mainly operates as a striker. He can also operate as a winger.

== Personal life ==
Pontergard has regarded Ivory Coast international Didier Drogba as his football idol. He has served in the French military.
