= Cap d'Agde =

Seaside resort in Agde, France

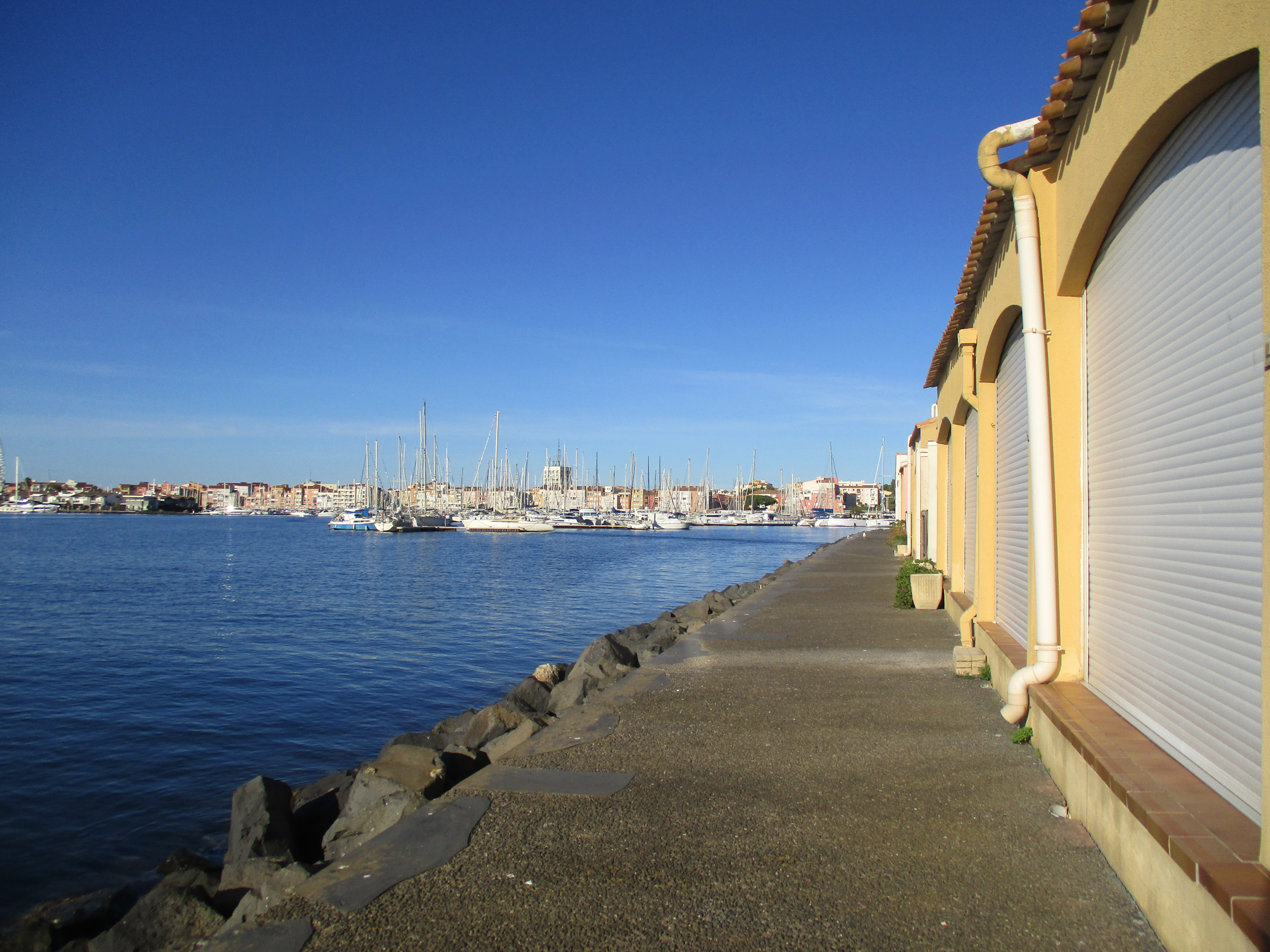
The ground floor apartments of the buildings on the quay of the Ile des pêcheurs in Cap d'Agde, you can see at the end of the port the shopping centre and the campanile.

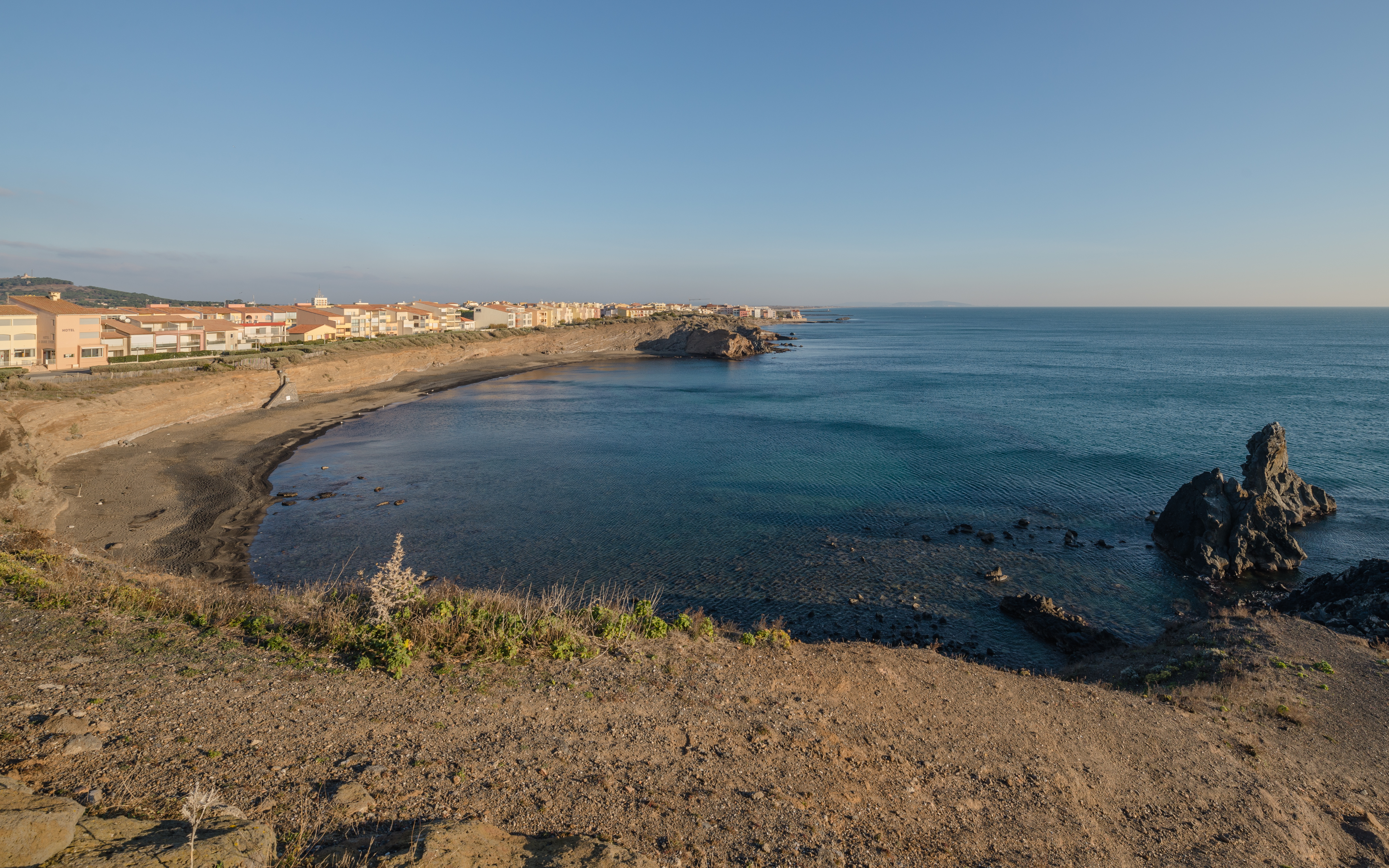
Grande Conque.

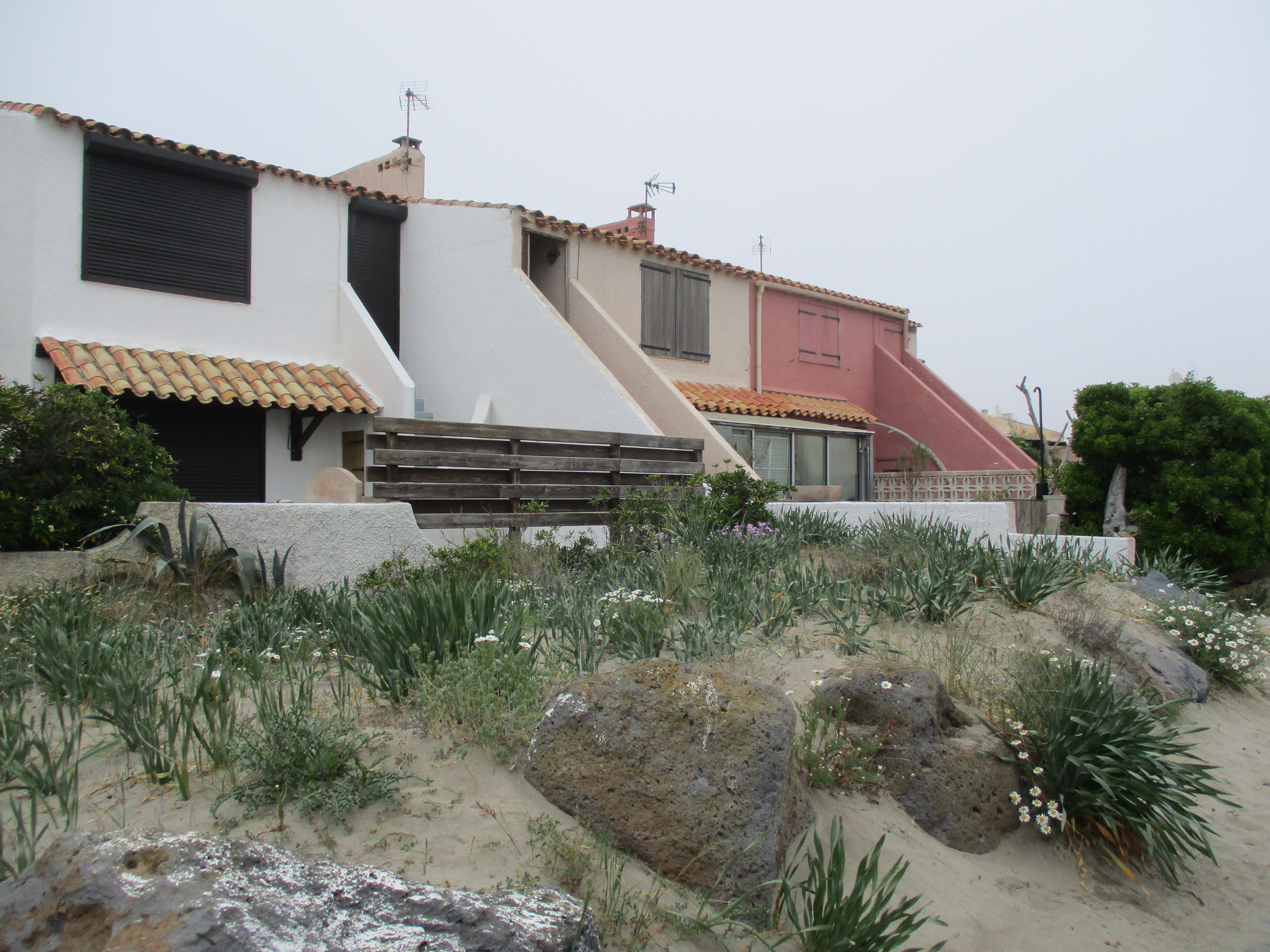
External staircase to 1st floor, coming from the garden, roof with round terracotta tiles.

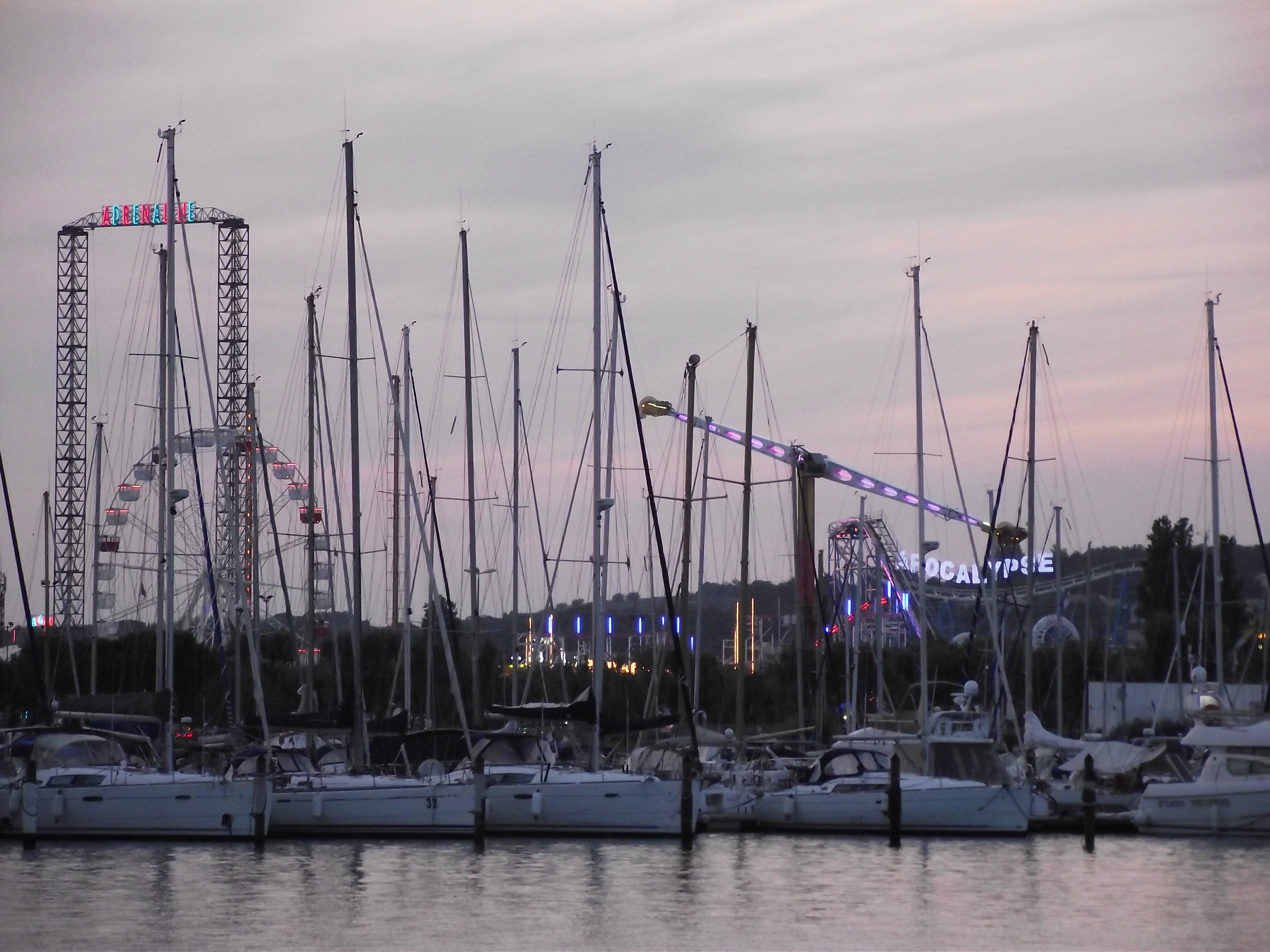
View of Luna Park Cap d'Agde from the port.

Cap d'Agde (French pronunciation: [kap daɡd]) is a seaside resort on France's Mediterranean coast. It is located in the commune of Agde, in the Hérault department within the region of Occitanie. Cap d'Agde was planned by architect Jean Le Couteur as part of one of France's largest ever state-run holiday schemes. An increasing number of retirees reside there from 1980 onwards.

Agde can be reached by TGV SNCF train direct from Paris, Lille or Geneva whilst the closest airport is Béziers-Cap-d'Agde airport, which runs direct budget airline services to the UK and Scandinavia. Agde is also served by Montpellier-Fréjorgues airport. Public transport (taxi or bus) is available between Agde and Cap d'Agde. In place of the wine yards, it is now one of the largest marinas on the French Mediterranean. On June 4, 1971, the town was classified as a "seaside resort".

== Development ==
Historically, the area was occupied by moorland and vineyards, and the only industry at the beginning of the 20th century was distilleries. After World War II, a naturist campsite (Camp Oltra) was set up in Port Lano (former Port Ambonne). Due to the 1960s increase in paid annual leave and the introduction of plastic for the construction of sail and motor boats there was a recognized need for structured coastal development for the French coasts. A sea resort at Agde was planned in the 1960s by the Mission Racine in the mosquito-infested salt marsh in Cap d'Agde, the Luno lagoon, built in 1967 by SEBLI from Béziers and SOGEBI. The mass plan, designed by Jean Le Couteur, is laid out in concentric circles of the different thematic zones (housing, parking, leisure, etc.) around the port. The SODEAL, the builder run by Agde, was established in 1990.

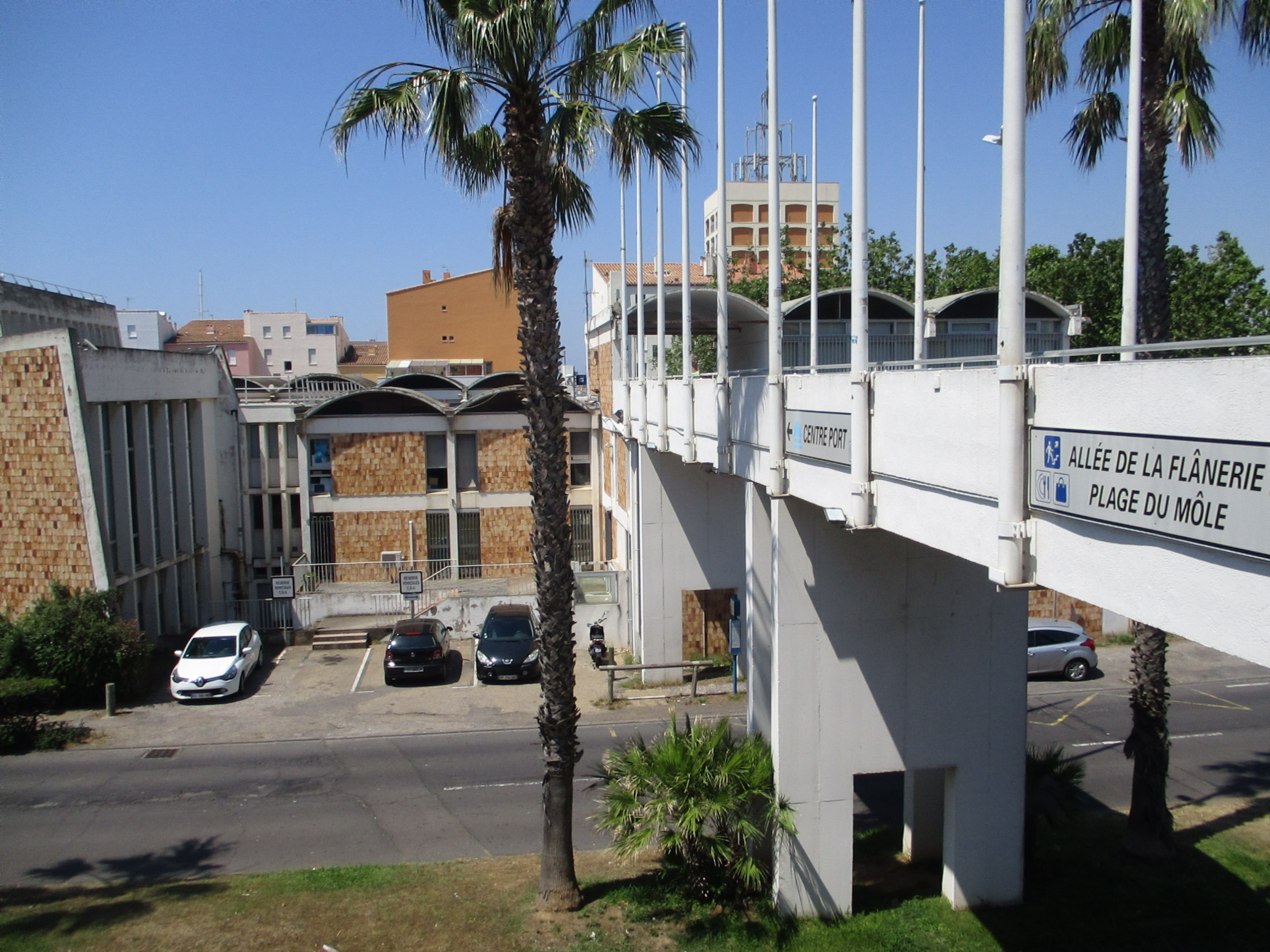
Built in Cap d'Agde, footbridge from the Flanerie to the Port, in the background on the left, former 1981 congress centre-theater hall, annex town hall, post-office, tourism-office.

The A9 freeway was built between 1960 and 1978, serving Port Camargue to Argelès. The mosquitoes were removed from lagoons by chemical spraying. In 2024, aerial and land sprays were still being done. The urbanization mission with its architectural rules came to an end in 1983. By the 1960s, most buildings were small houses typically used by locals on weekends, among which the winegrowers' lean-tos remained. Wine production has plummeted since the sea resort was planned, and the traditional piquette is no longer an economically viable option. At the beginning of the 20th century in Grau there was a start of tourist activity with casino gambling permitted in 2 places. With the exception of a winery and small plots of farming land belonging to non-residents, plus a temporary exploitation of salt marshes at the beginning of the century, and the usual fishing by small boats, the cape was mostly uninhabited. At that time, the State carried out expropriations in Cap d'Agde to avoid land speculation while the practice of illegal occupations, including on the islands, generally persisted.

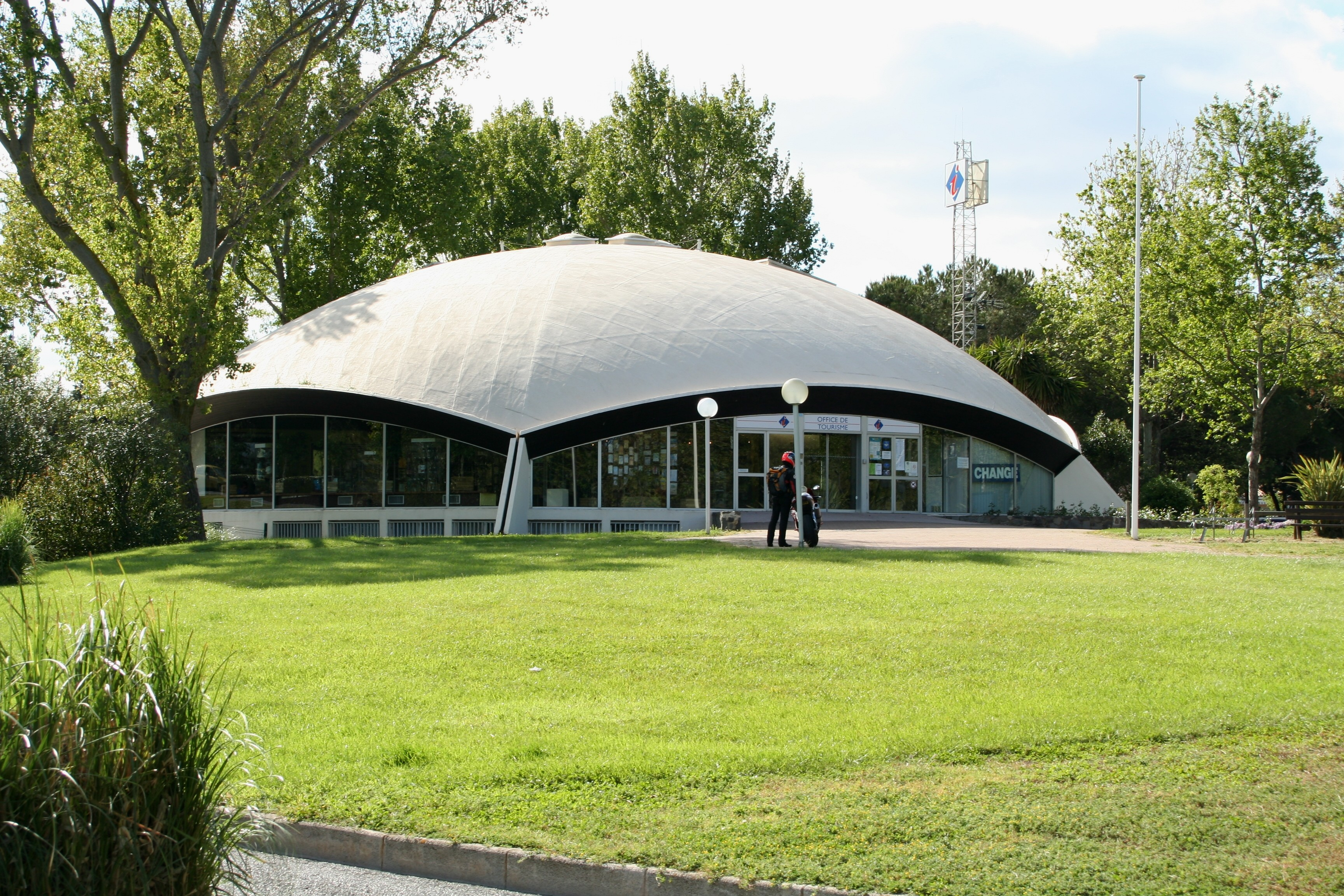
Built from 1981 (once in the office of the former convention center), the Tourist Office was located below the tracks of the central raised roundabout of the Port of Cap d'Agde, a roundabout restored level in 2016. The office then moved in 2024 to the new center.

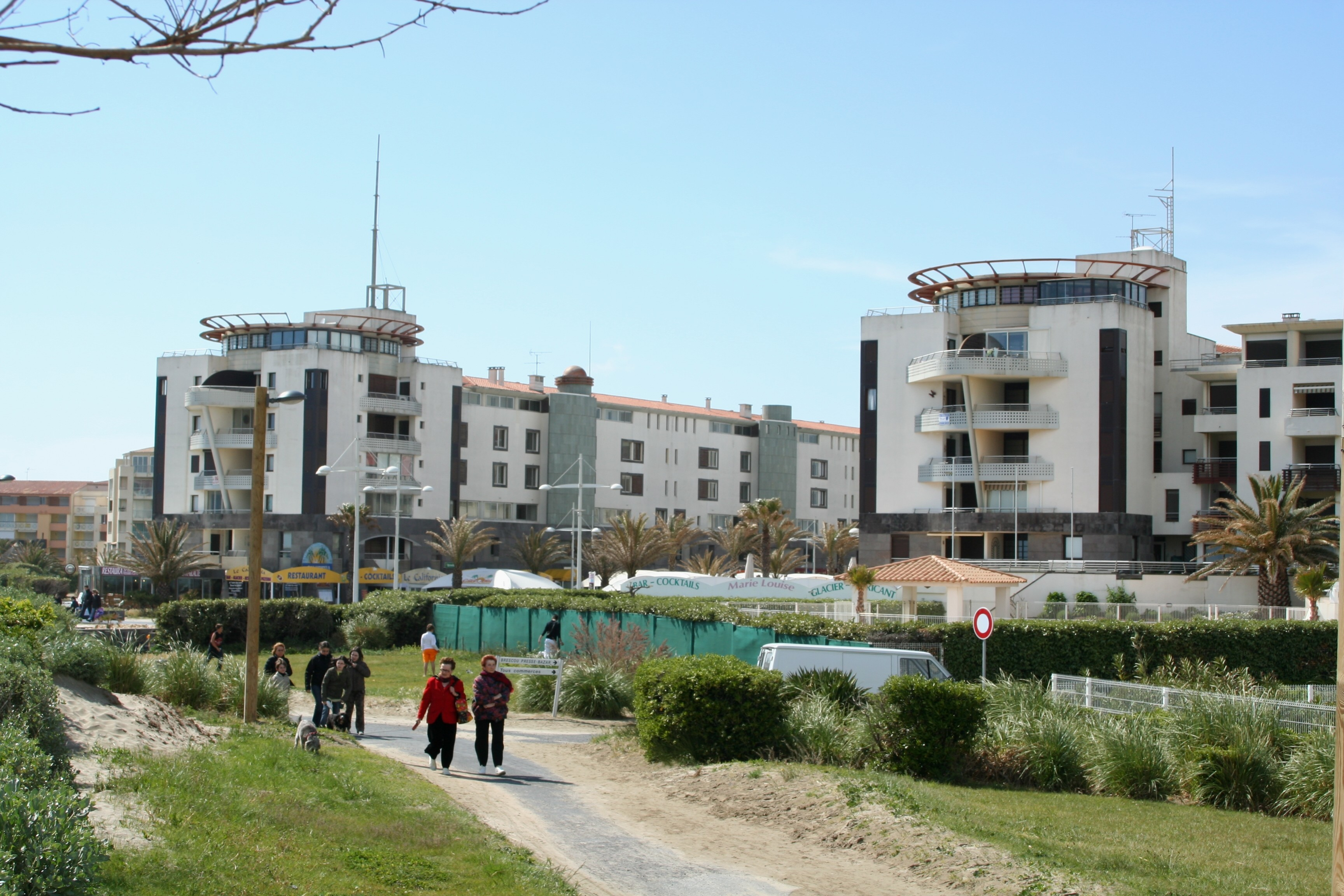
Rochelongue's Mail built in 2000, south extension towards Grau d'Agde.

The first urban plan for Cap d'Agde was to stabilize sand with plants (pines, eucalyptus, coconuts, date palms and neriums), build dunes against wind and shore rains, and excavate a grand marina for sailing boats. The building of houses started 5 years later, with a subdivision (plat), and flats in the housing estate near the port and the shore (sea side). Numerous circular car parks have been set up for access to the beaches. They have been planted with tamarisk and pine trees. The mostly winding boulevards that connect the residences are lined with eleagnus or oleanders, as a distinct sign the middle strip is planted with large trees of a specific type. Due to the German occupation, anti-landing mines were placed on the beaches (particularly at the Môle). The Landing Memorial, built in 1980, memorializes this time on the hill; it is also the place with the best view of the Pyrenees in the distance and of the entire coastline between Spain and Sète. In 1976, Richelieu-Rochelongue (in the extension to the South of the marina), but also the urbanization of Mont Saint-Martin was designed.

The last vineyard in Bagnas is now very small below Château Maraval, with the Meyer distillery in ruins, walking in is a planned tourist-office leisure nowadays. This "wine tourism" has been in full development for several years. The main tourist festival in the 21st century is the Vinocap trade show. Cars and motorcycles are the folkloric elements for the summer. Bikers with their motorcycles are blessed in a ceremony by a priest in the central plaza.

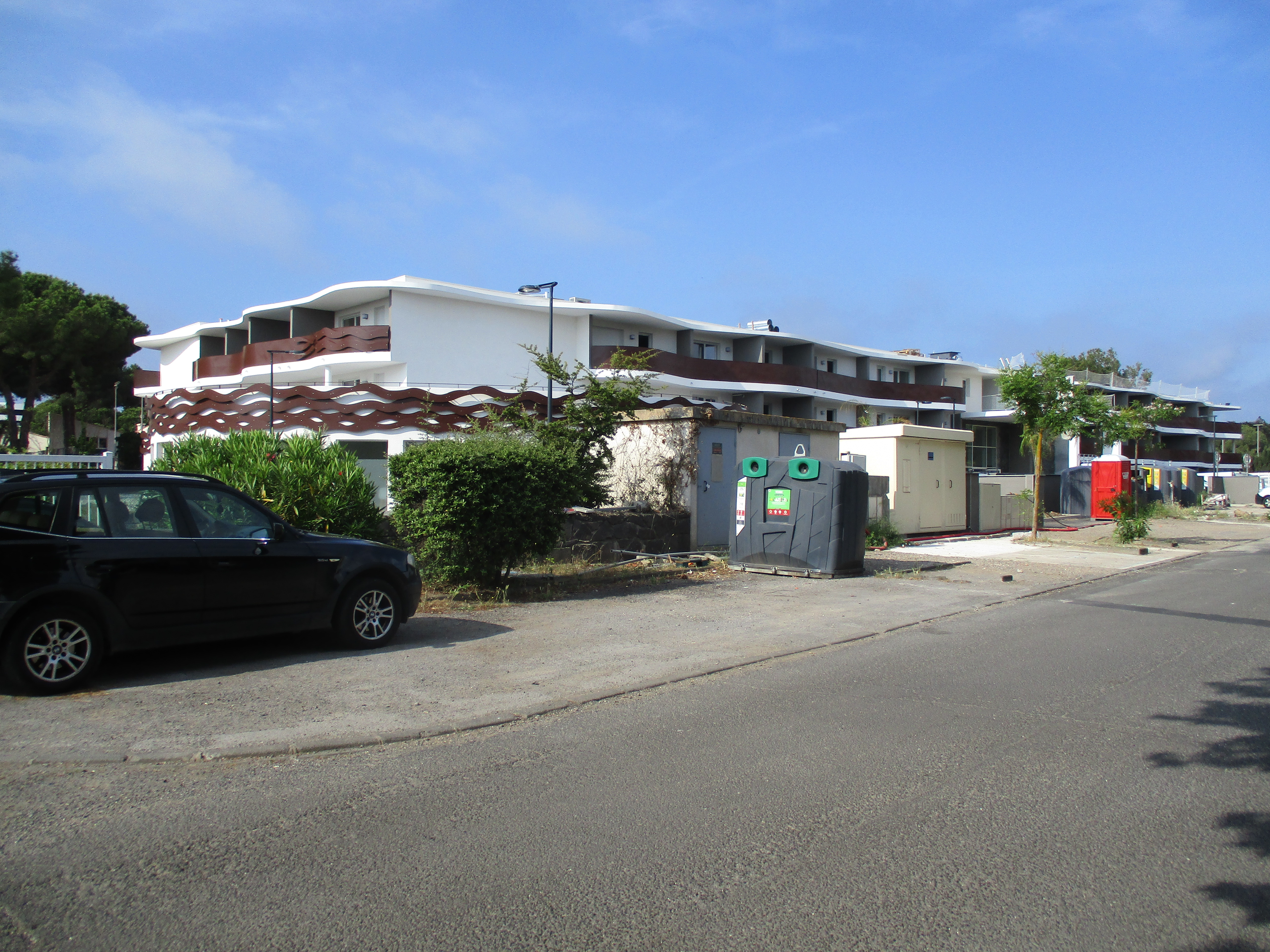
Cap d'Agde International Tennis Centre, Medical Centre 2023.

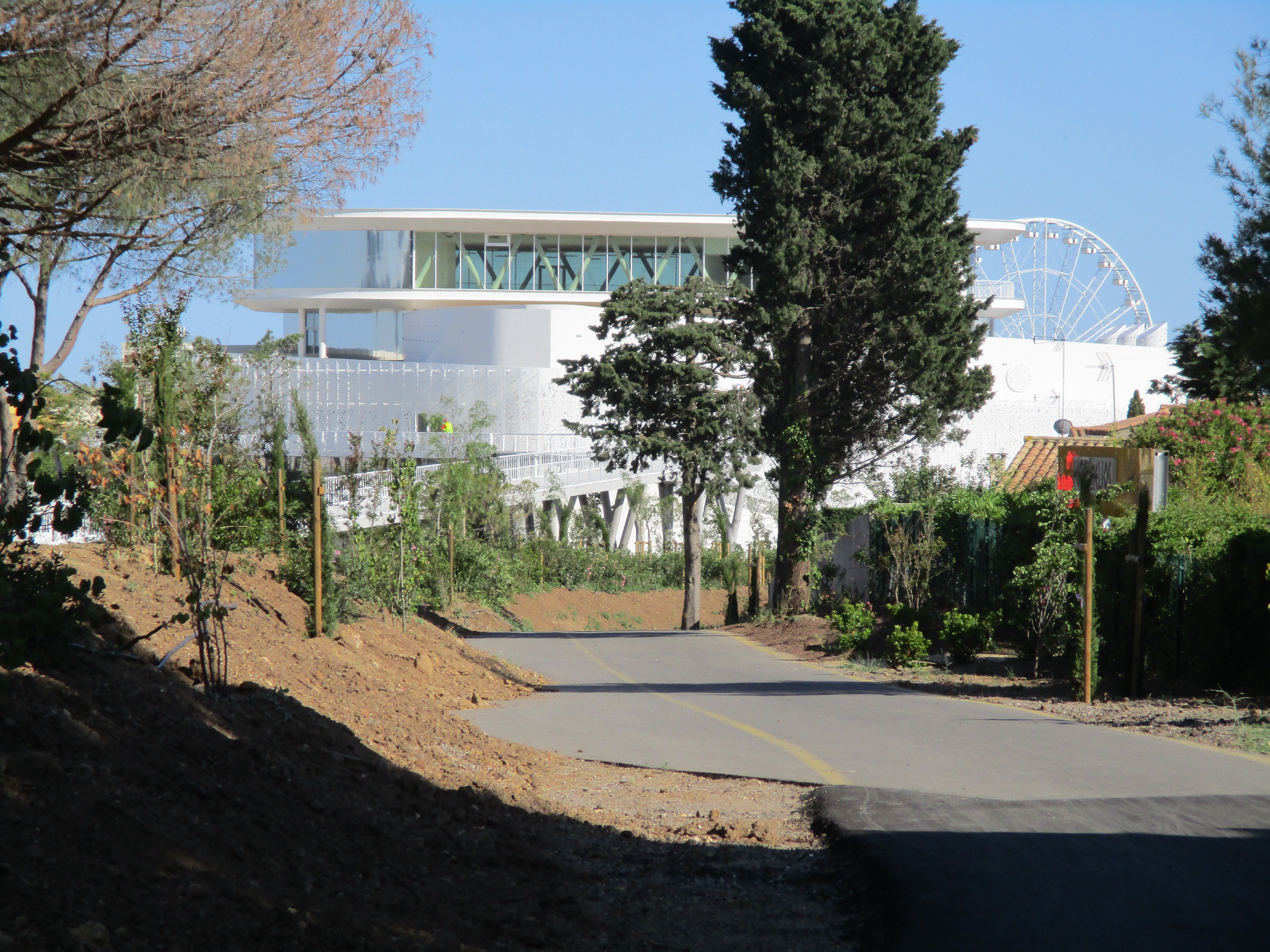
The new Palais des congrès Hervé Di Rosa, its belvedere, next to the bubble of the Tourist Office, 2019.

Streets are labyrinthine in the 1960s urban plan, shaped with numerous central parking places serving points of interest. After Lano was established, further urbanization took place in the 1980s between Le Môle beach and the Memorial cape. In 1983 Thalacap, a thalassotherapy institute, opened in a hotel; it closed down in 2006. In the 2000s a new Cap d'Agde center was designed, not in the Mediterranean style as defined in the Mission Racine, but the International Style with a new Rambla-style street. And this appears in new Congress Palace and the Casino Barrière facades with their rhythmic perforated metal facades; To improve the value of the city with the aim of attracting more prosperous people to live there. The golf course (2013) and municipal campsites (2022) experienced a change in management providers. On the 4 main beaches, lifeguards are on duty at several stations, most days in the summer.

== Marinas ==
There are 2 marinas in Cap d'Agde, many slipways are along the shore mainly for little boats.

=== Marina Centre Cap ===
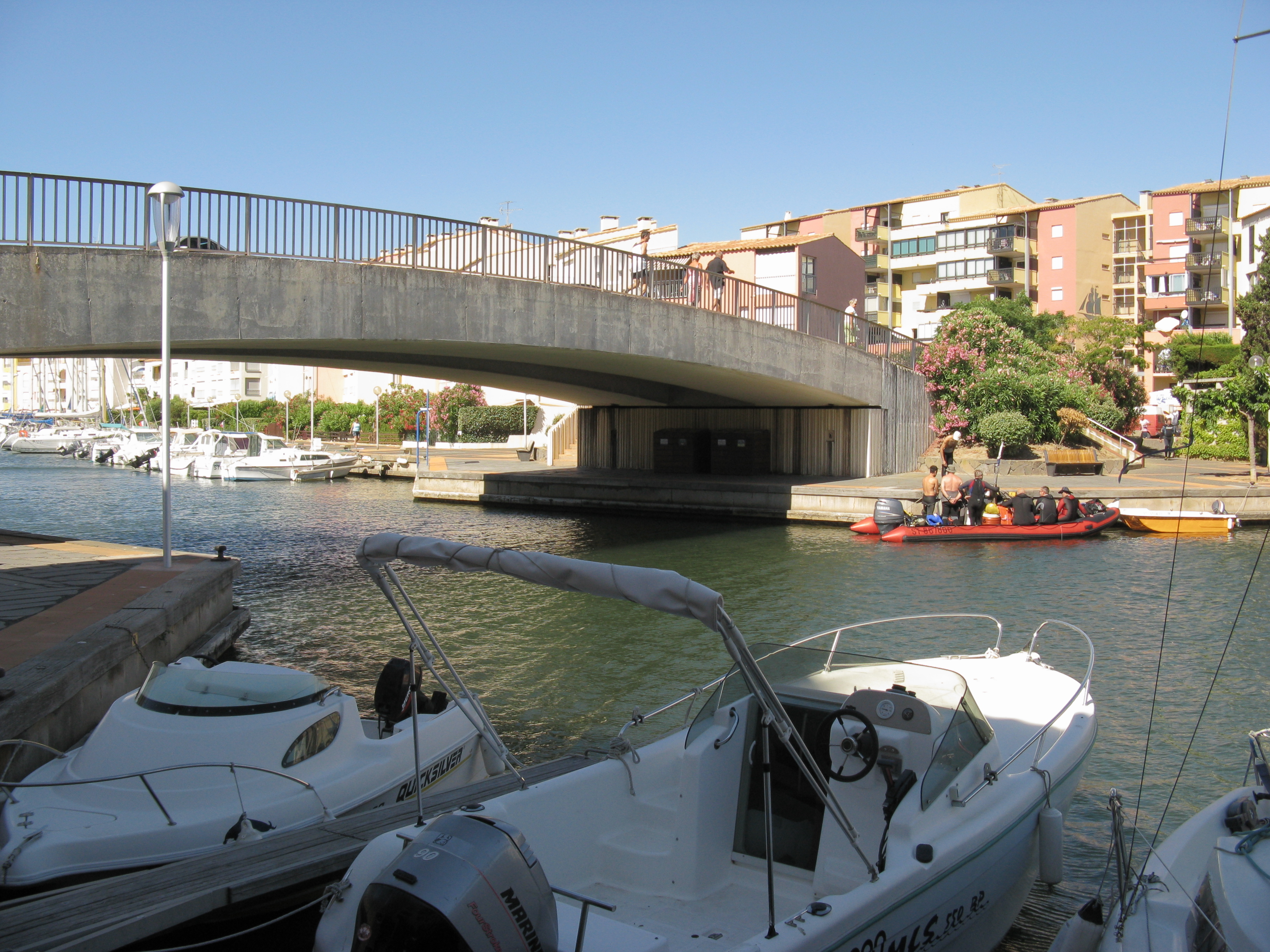
Gateway to Ile des Pêcheurs.

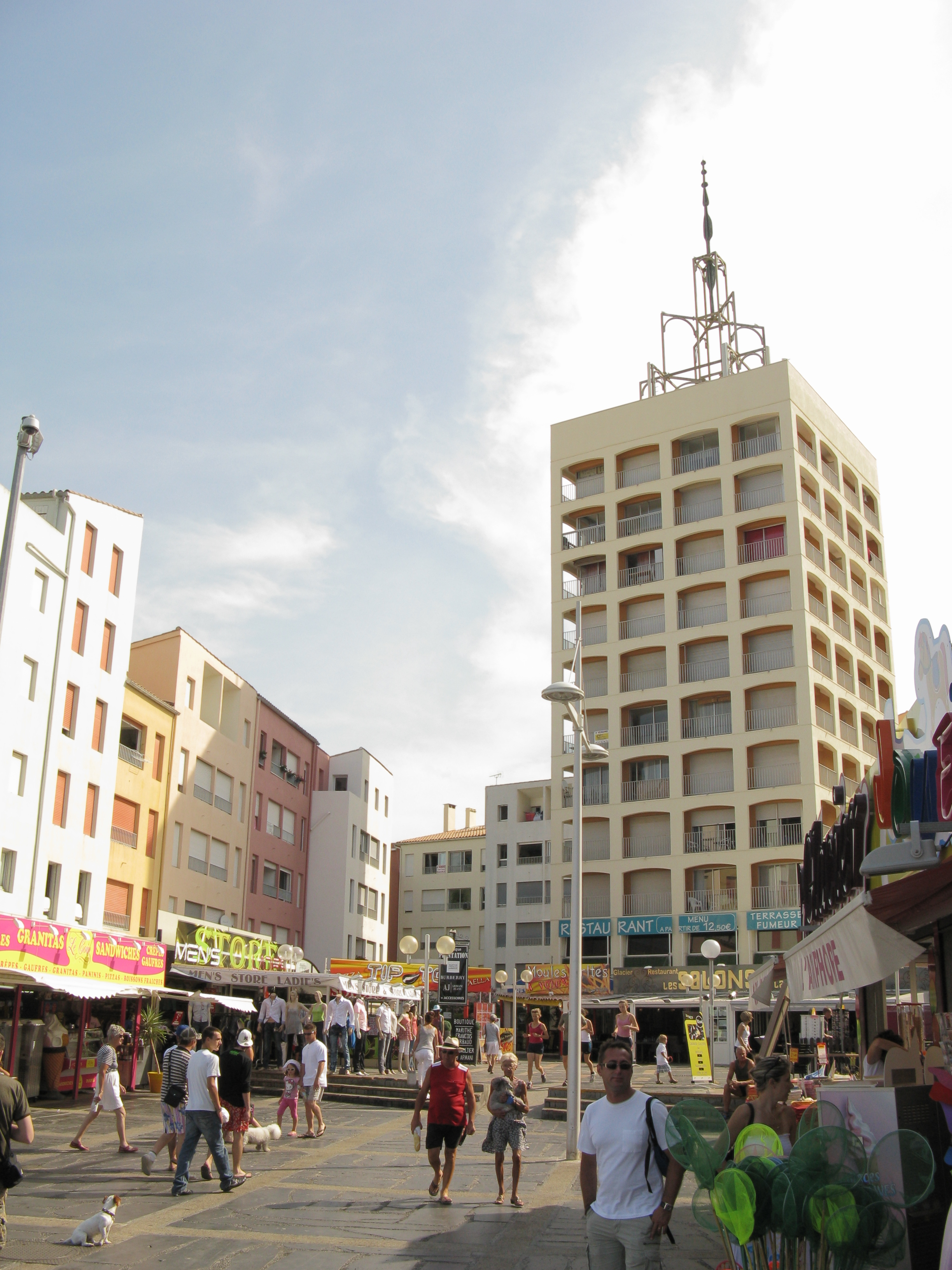
Campanile, landmark-middle of the quays.

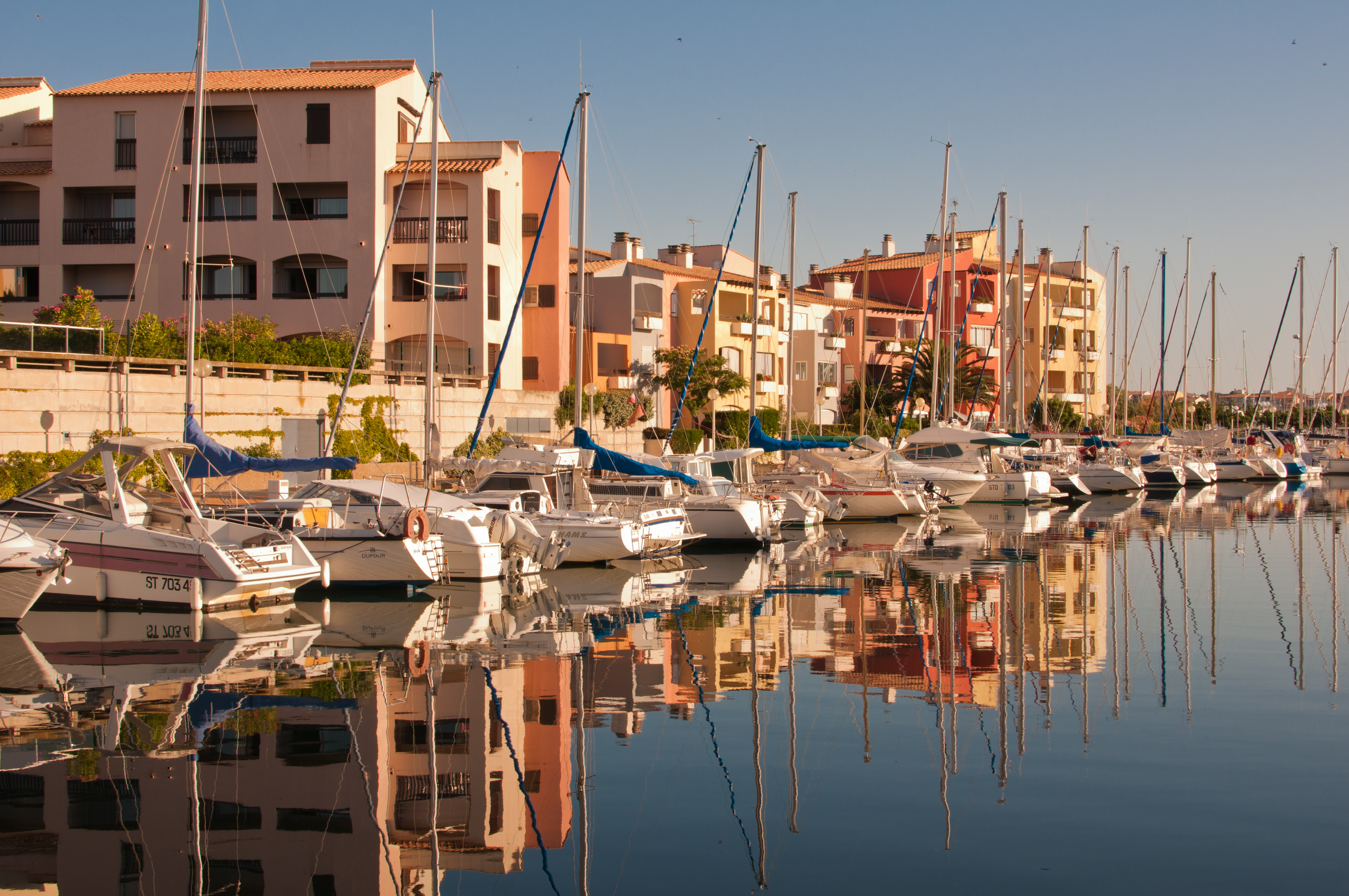
Vieux Port.

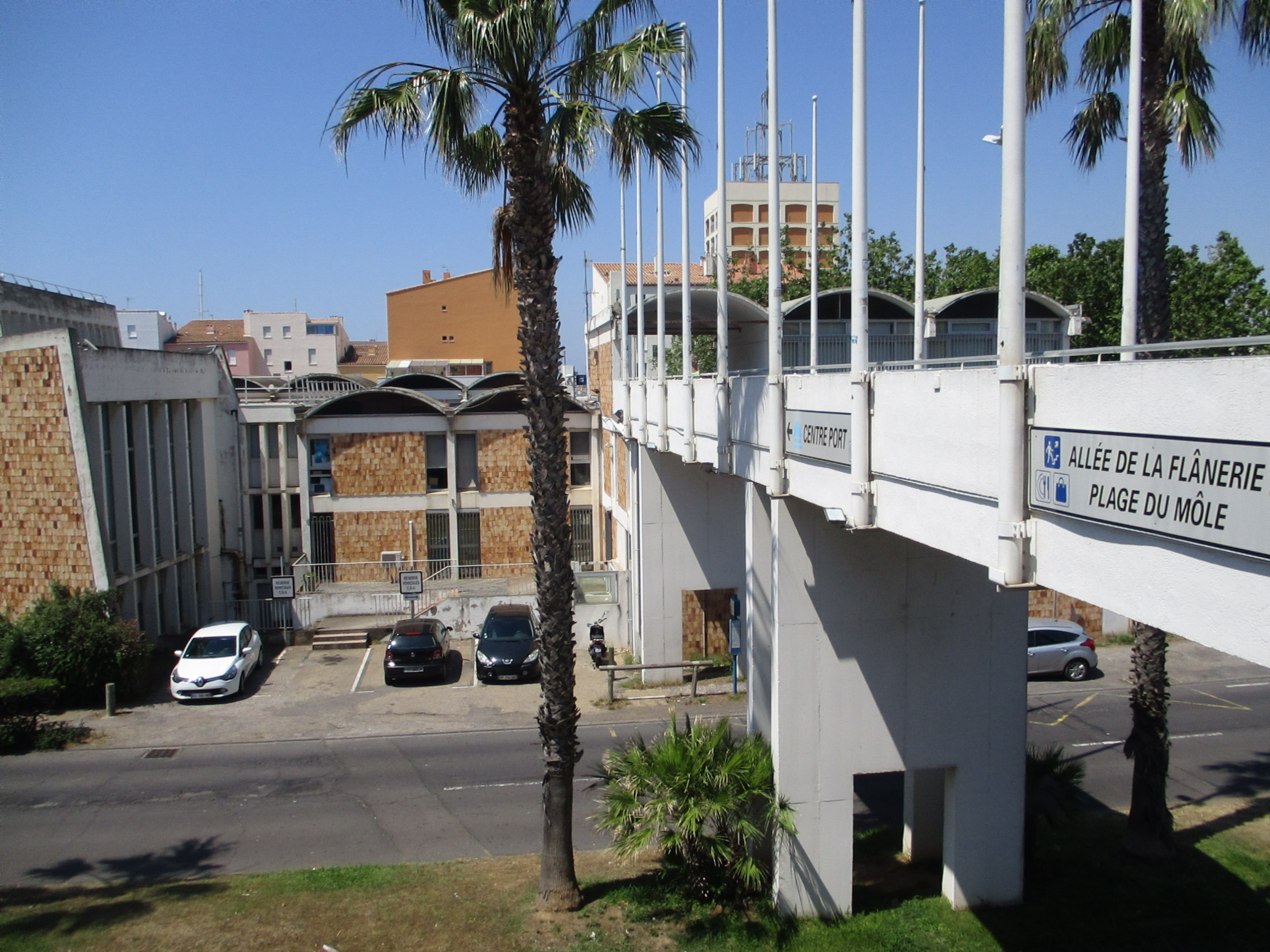
Footbridge from Flanerie to the Port, background Cap d'Agde former center 1970s annexes.

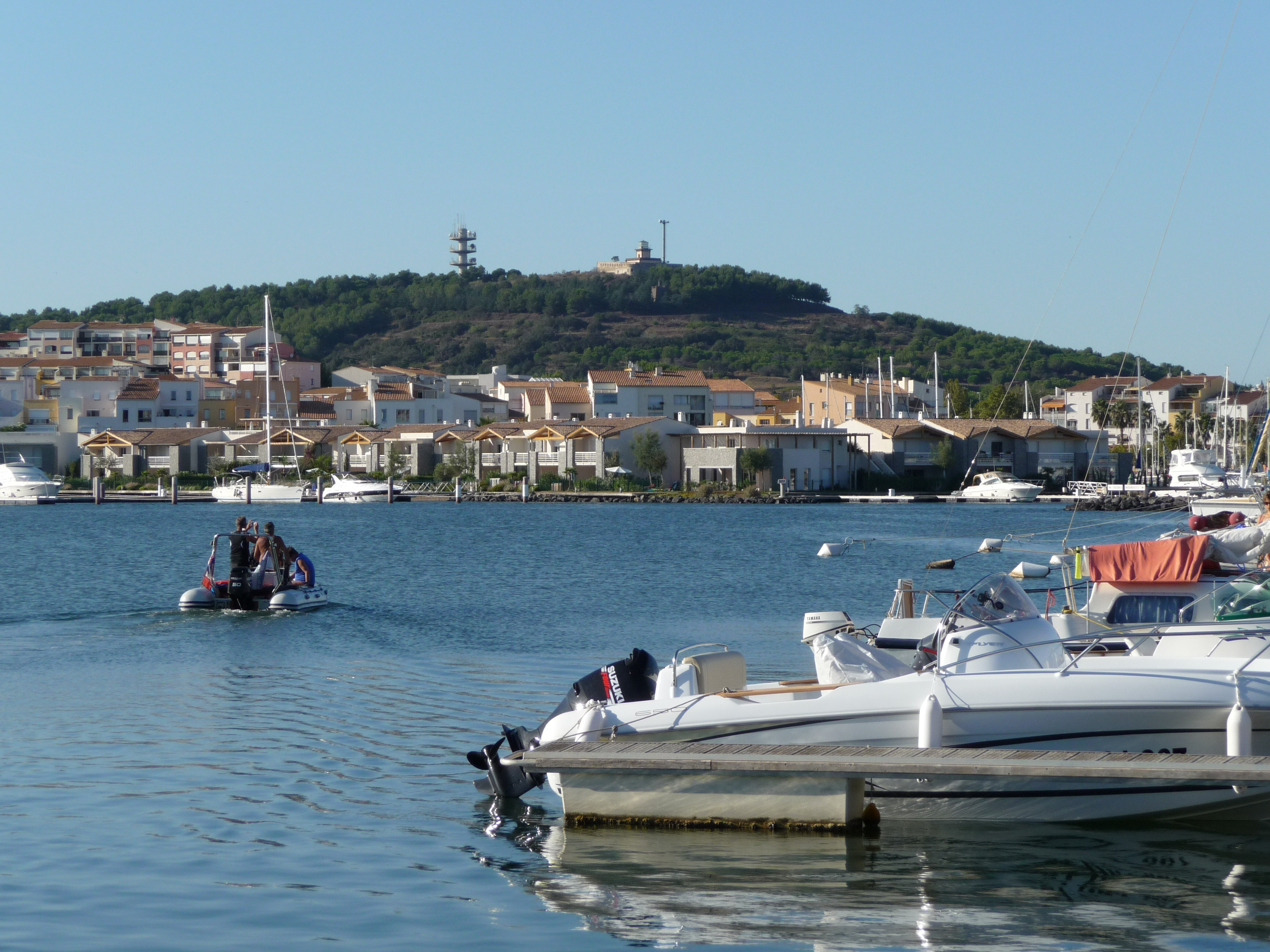
Ile St Martin in the background, and St Loup hill in the distance above.

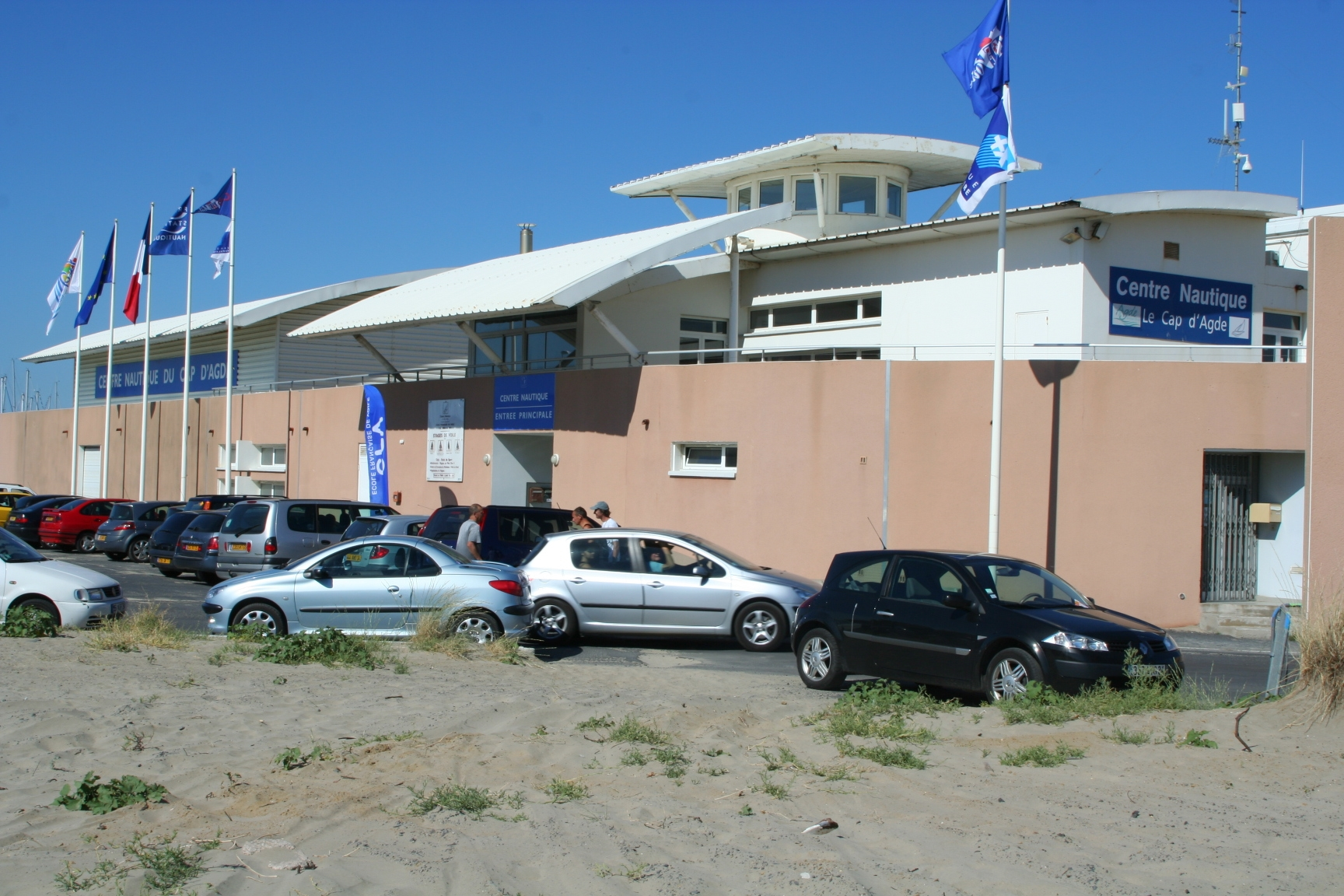
Sail center.

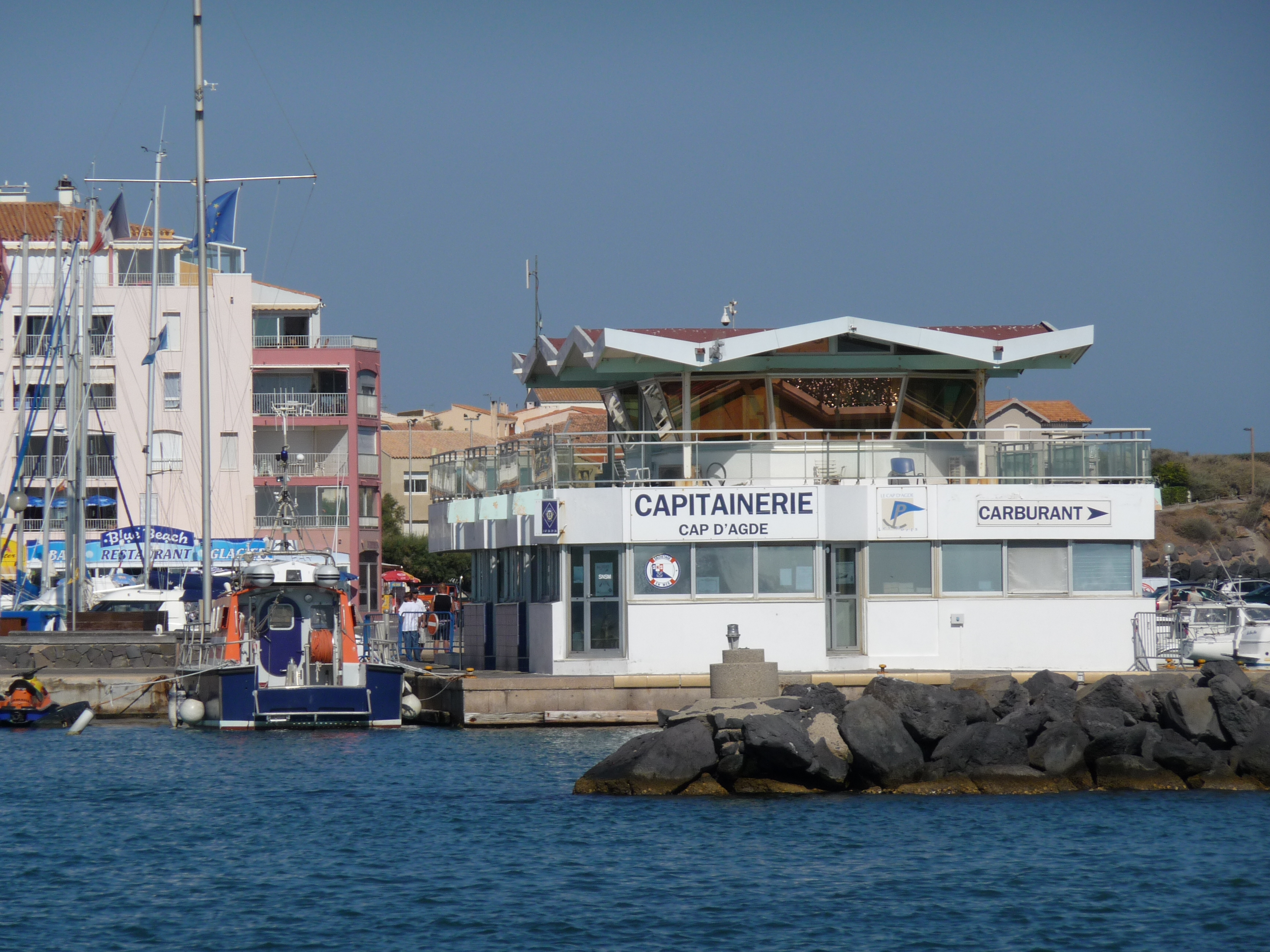
Harbour-master offices.

The initial marshland was formed by the flow of water from the Monts d'Agde. The area became a salt-producing place in the 1910s. The marina has occupied the area since, serving as a base for Mediterranean cruises to Spain (50 miles), the Balearics (200 miles) or Corsica (230 miles). The marina is composed of one entrance, 10 basins forming a 35-hectare body of water dredged to 3 m., attached to both the publicly-accessible and nonaccessible islands.

The part between accessible Ile des Loisirs and non-accessible Ile St Martin is the part of the harbor that contains privately held moorings that are sold with real estate property. The part between Ile St Martin and accessible Ile des Pêcheurs is the main part of the harbor where the mooring rings are rented to the harbour master. Composed of 3,100 mooring rings, this location is a home port with a small transit portion. The marina features:

- 6 sanitary blocks (toilets, showers, washbasins) with reserved access (electronic key).
- Reserved parking for yachtsmen.
- Fresh water and electricity (220 V single-phase and 380 V three-phase) at quayside.
- Secure pontoons (electronic key access): berths are equipped with catways and, for larger units, with piles or deadbeds.
- Special berths for multihulls.
- 2 slipways (Avant Port).
- European-standard waste disposal center.

The walk along the quays provides access to the shops, cafés, and restaurants. Just behind the waterfront there are grocery stores. A significant part of the population (holiday or annually for retirees) resides in that area. The first buildings for regular occupancy were built on the slope of the Bay of Le Môle, and include low-cost housing, which was done at the same time of the marina buildings with the landmark tower, the campanile. Expansion has taken place on both sides of this new center, with the last developments towards the old port taking place in the 1990s, which is now occupied and owned mainly by retirees, an evolution of the 1960 urban plan that only took working people into account; this element led to the design of the new Cap center after 2000, with larger and more expensive apartments.

=== Marina Port Lano ===
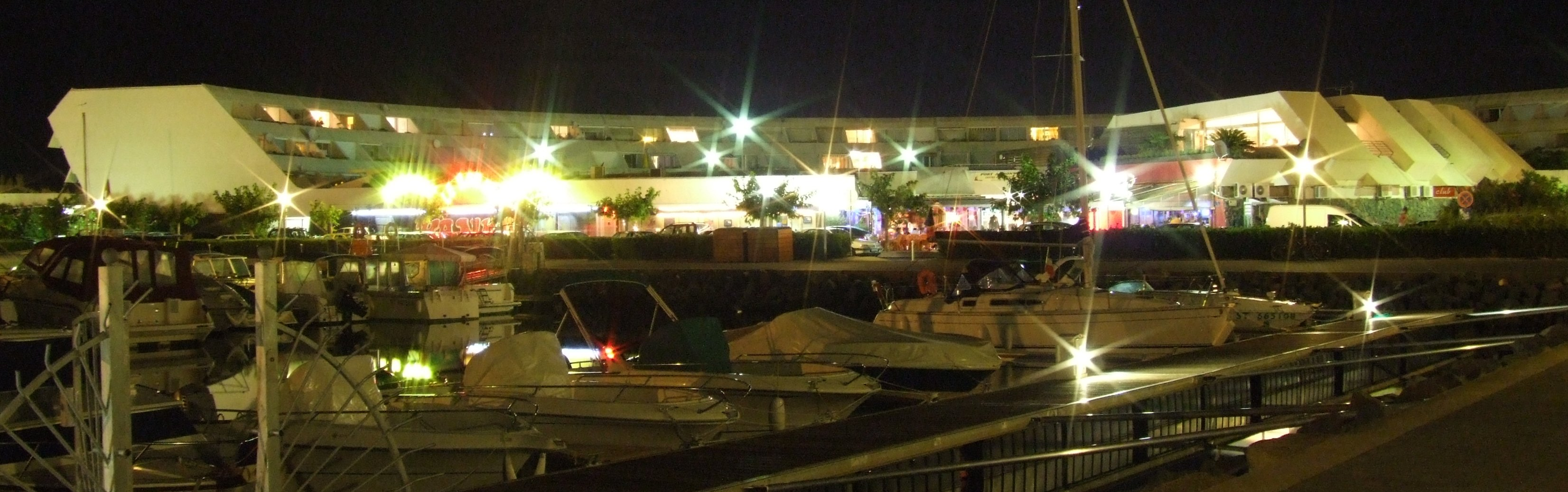
Naturist camp circular massive building (small apartments), and in front, the marina.

Near the naturist camp, the marina has about 60 places for boats up to 17 metres (56 ft) in length and a large boat yard. Its In racks dry port stocks cabin cruisers, with racks and elevator for motorboats (no sail baoats).

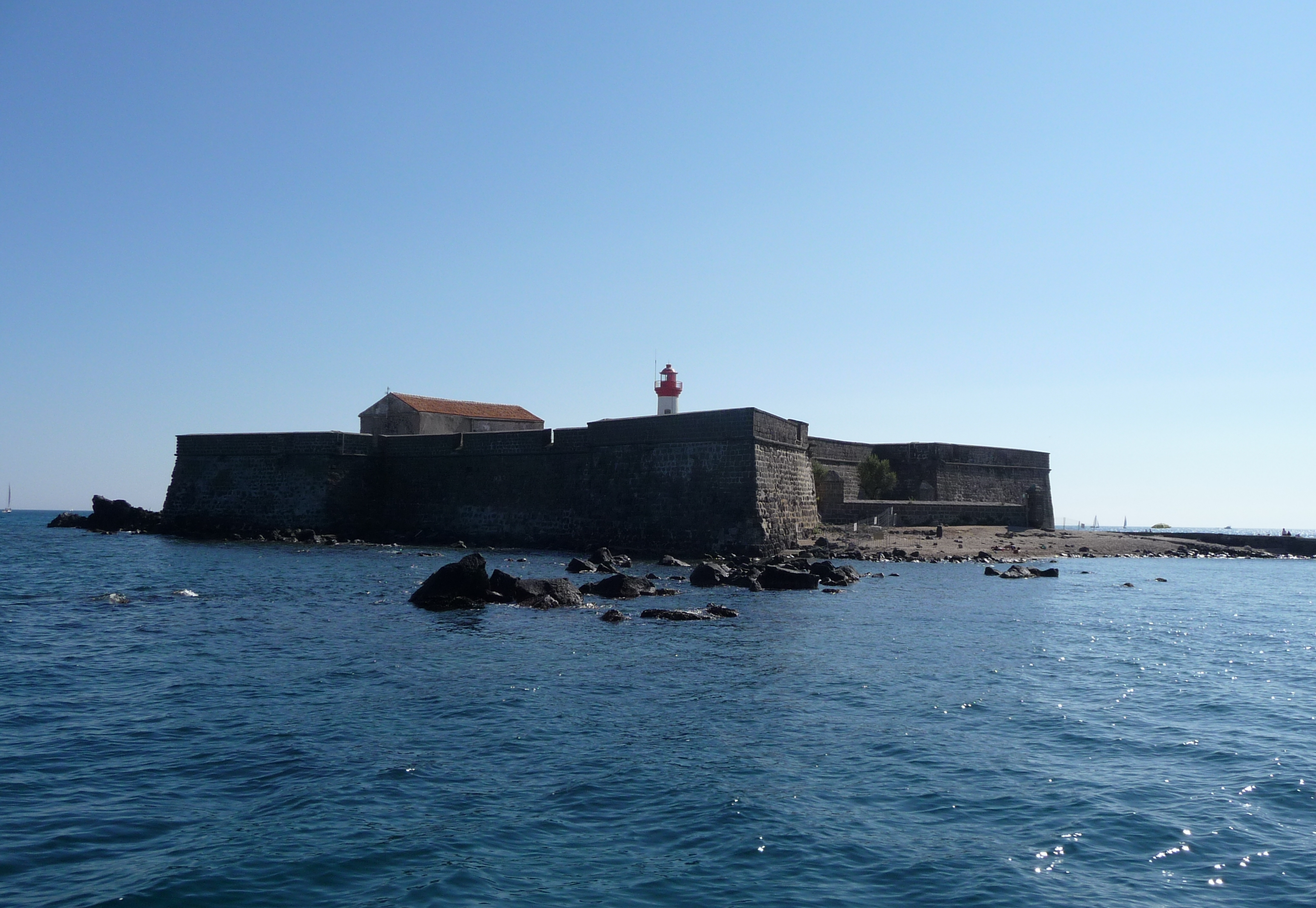
Fort Brescou locks and protects the port of Richelieu's time.

== Recreational activities ==
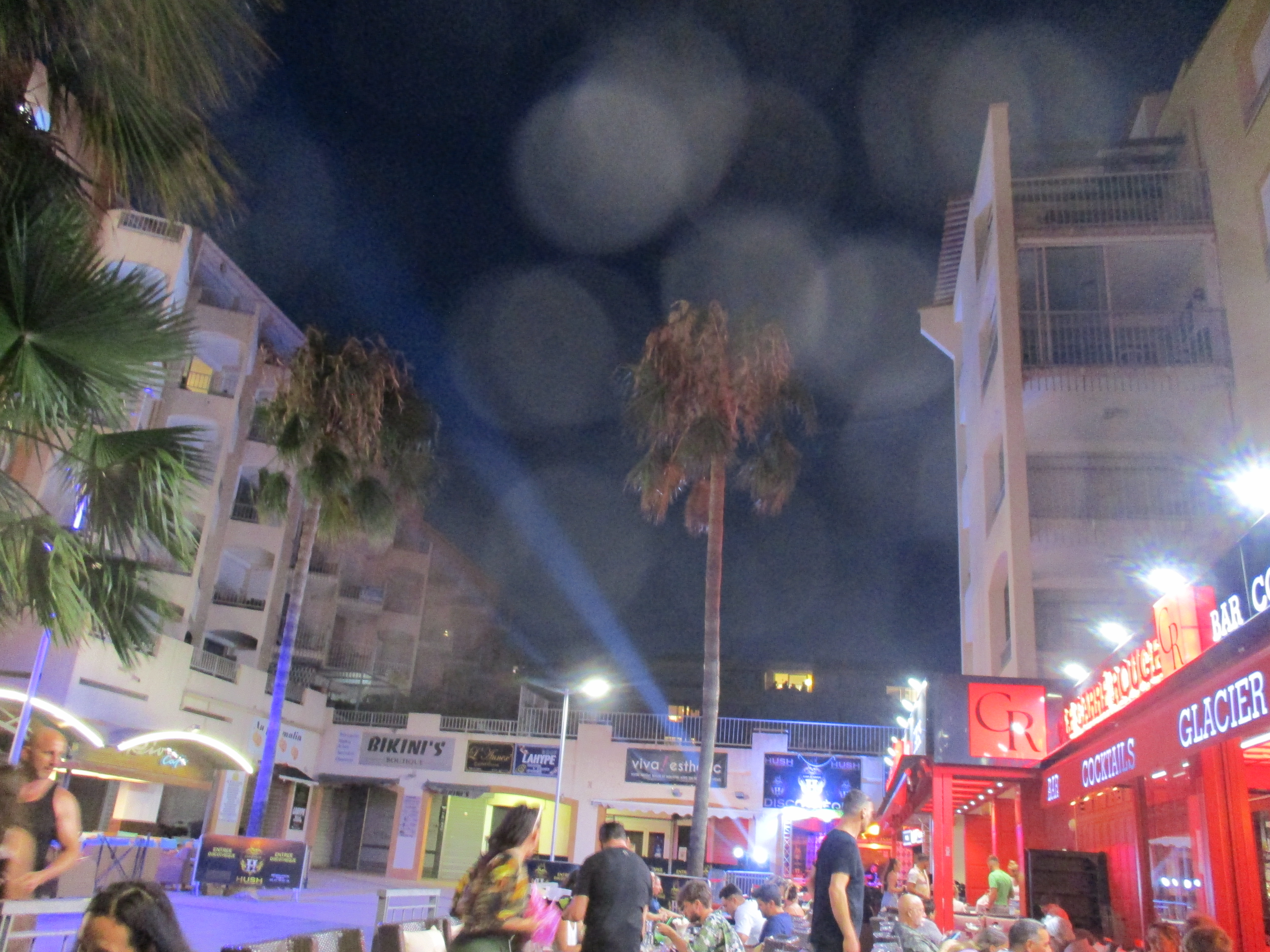
Cap d'Agde, on the Port, discotheque located on a square set back from the quay, night illuminated by spotlights.

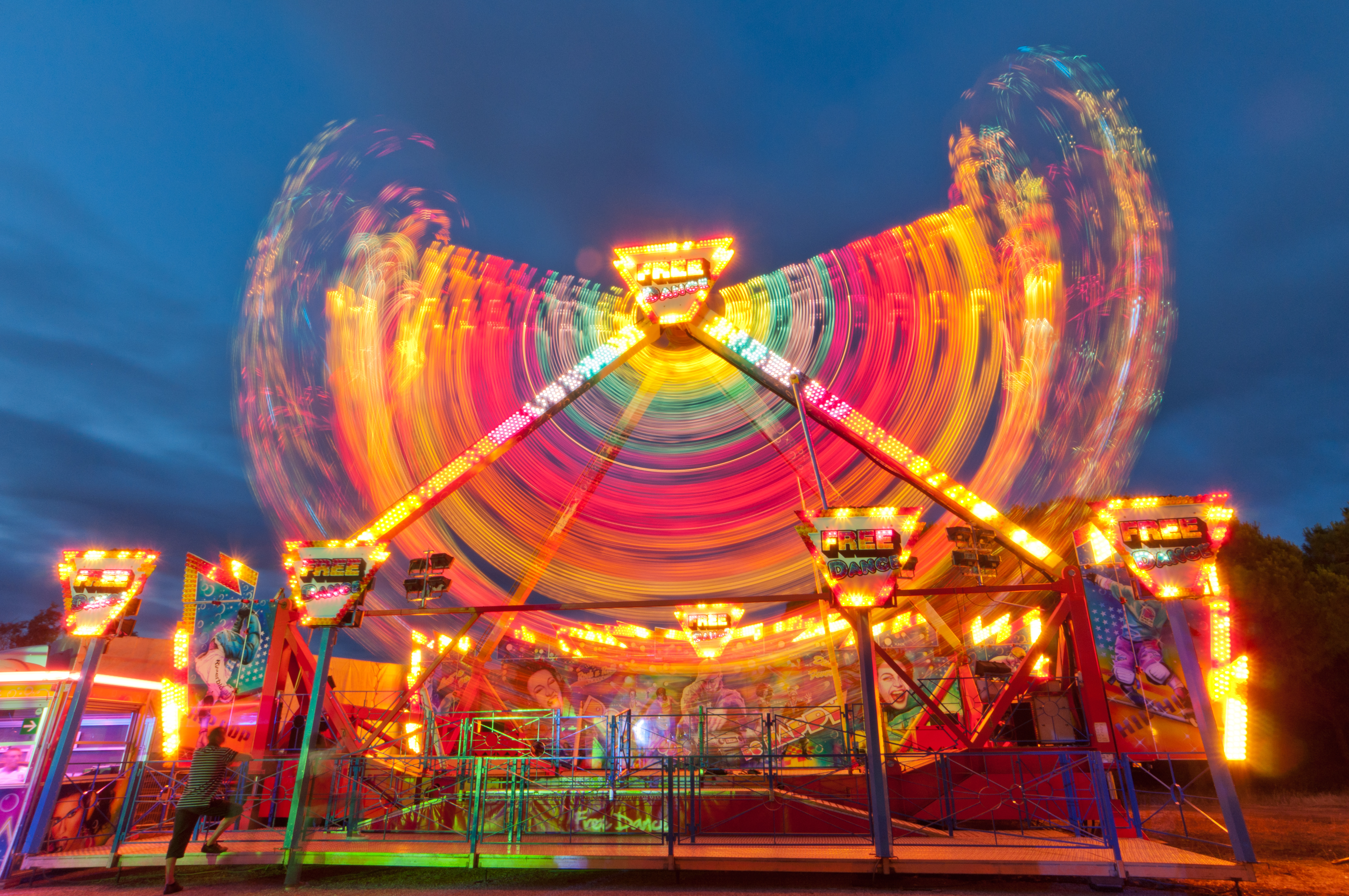
Amusement in Ile des Loisirs (Leisure Island).

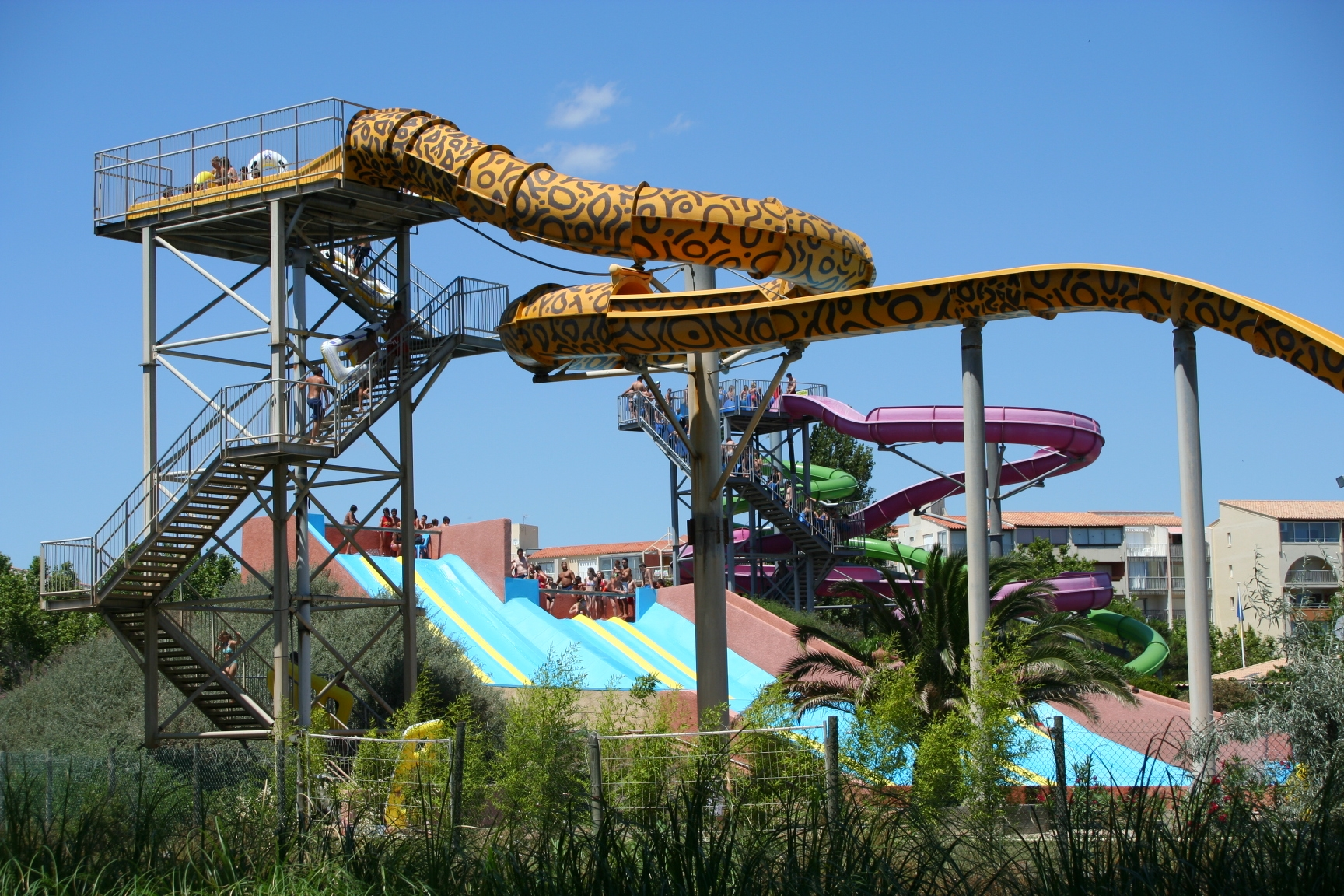
Aqualand.

Most of them are located in commercial parks with commercial purposes, others are necessary for the local population while others have free entry and an educational purpose. Underwater fishing has taken place since the creation of Cap d'Agde in the nearby seagrass beds. Leisure areas have been created, such as the Ile des Loisirs, designed in 1976, in the main marina, as well as an amusement park, nightclubs, and in the past a casino (1970s).The Aqualand day-swimming theme park was one of the first of its kind (1984). Between Cap d'Agde and Grau d'Agde, the Centre Aquatique de l'Archipel ("Cité de l'Eau"), a 21st-century construction by the town and the Hérault Méditerranée urban community.

The former tennis camp was created by Pierre Barthès, on his grandmother's field, whilst Racine plan is beginning, in the first 1970s'. It became since the International Tennis Center. In 1978 a club house and an hotel are built for the international competition. Its modern padel hall opened in 2022 after the takeover by SODEAL the developer, it replaces the hangar. Around the Tennis Camp, in its vicinity the tennis courts was the major theme for the development of housing estates, some exists near La Roquille beach. Golf practice is an activity that was set up in 1980s. Its extension (27 holes) was inaugurated in 2013.

Les Arènes du Cap offers a variety of shows and toro-pools during the summer season. Since 2003, the cultural season of the city of Agde opens with a film festival to which entry is free, it has moved from the old congress center to the new center of the "Rambla du Soleil". Outdoor activities are available in the Bagnas reserve, including hiking. The underwater trails have existed to discover underwater fauna since the establishment of the marina in 1967 with its marine protected area. In 2023, opened to public, an architecturally interesting floating Maison de la Mer was built in entrance of marina bassin n°1 to educationally illustrate the considerable connection between the shore and the salt water.

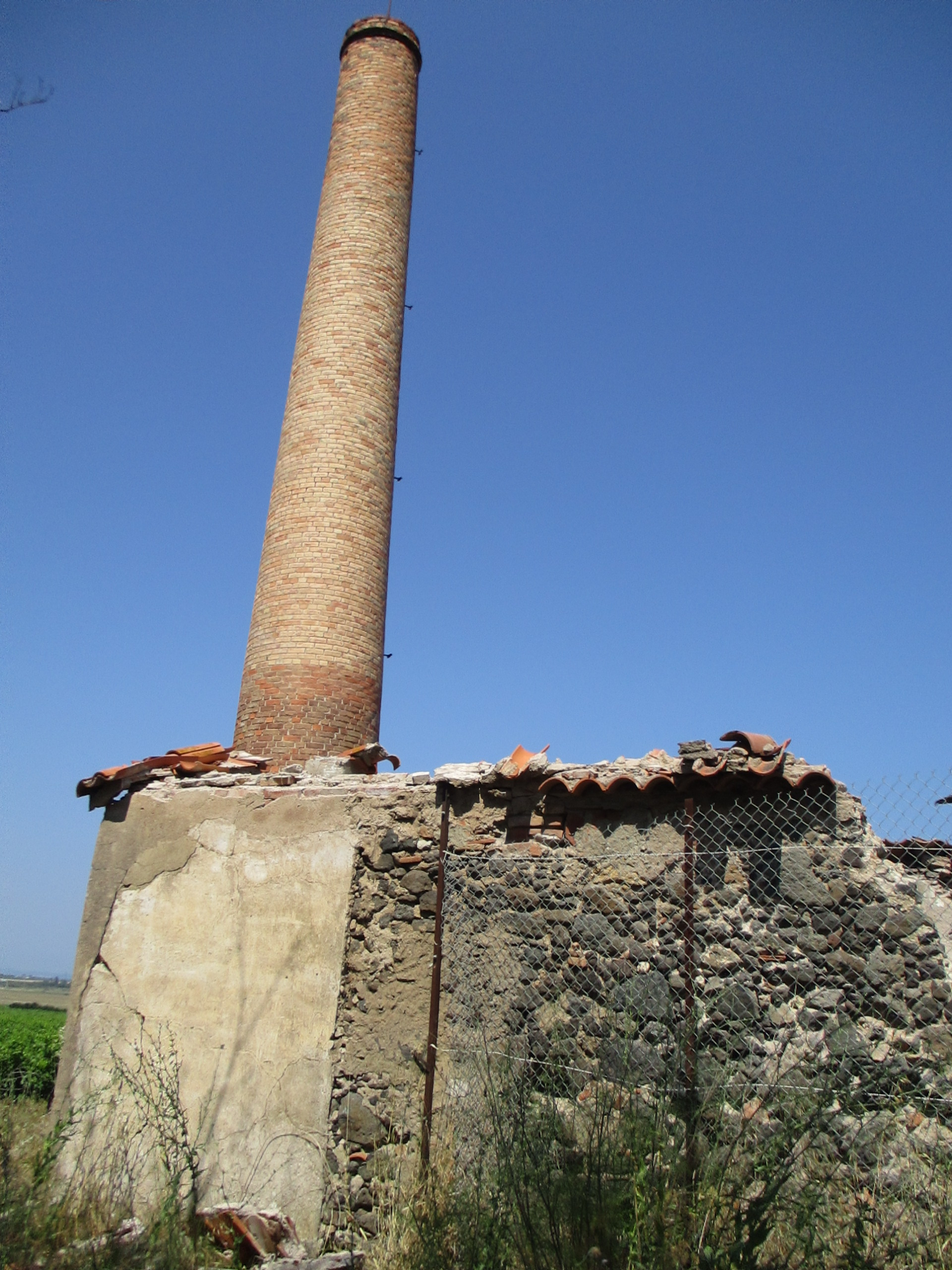
Cap d'Agde, Bagnas Reserve, distillery ruins, and a gathering point for hiking

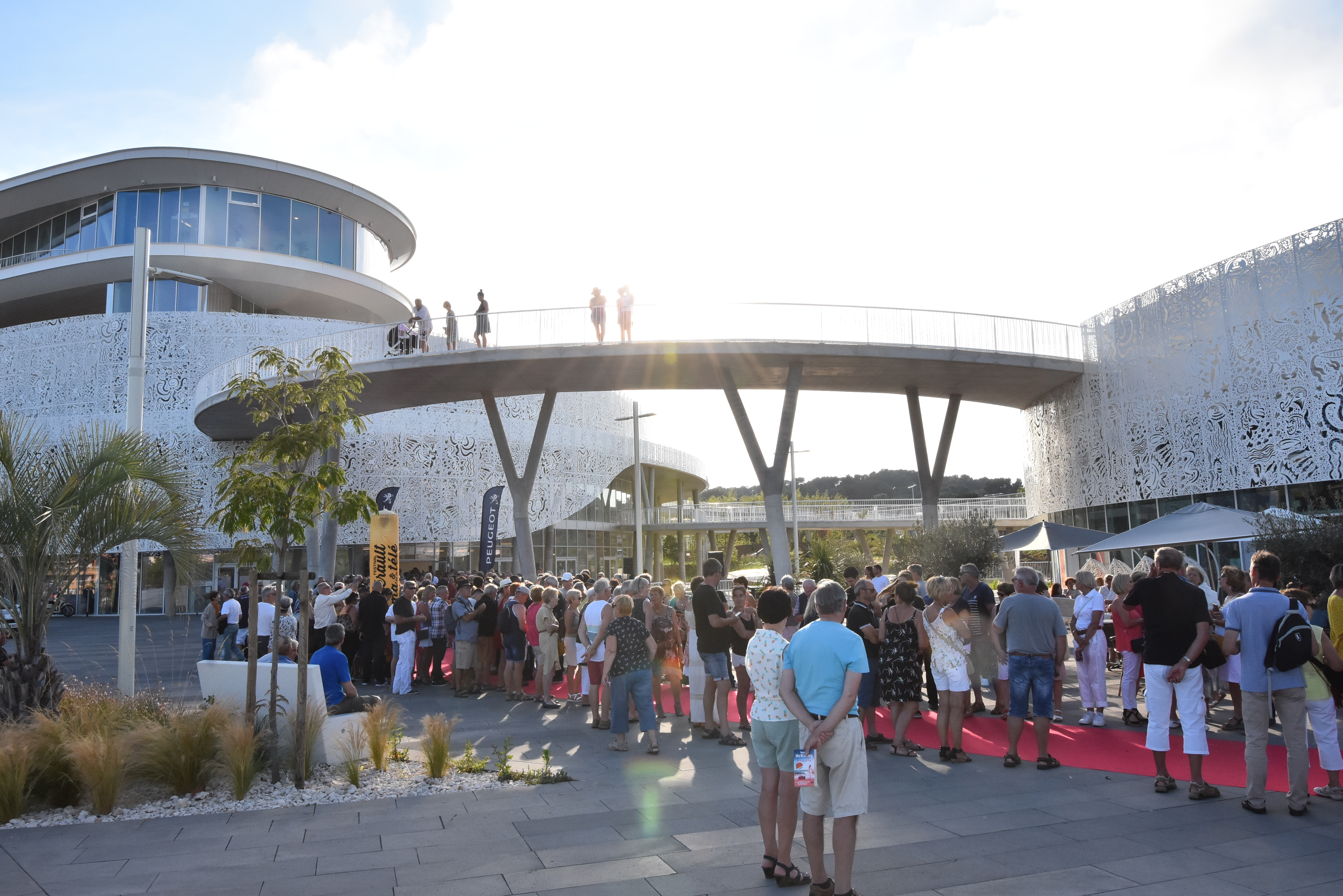
Congress palace while the movie festival "Hérault du Cinéma et de la TV"

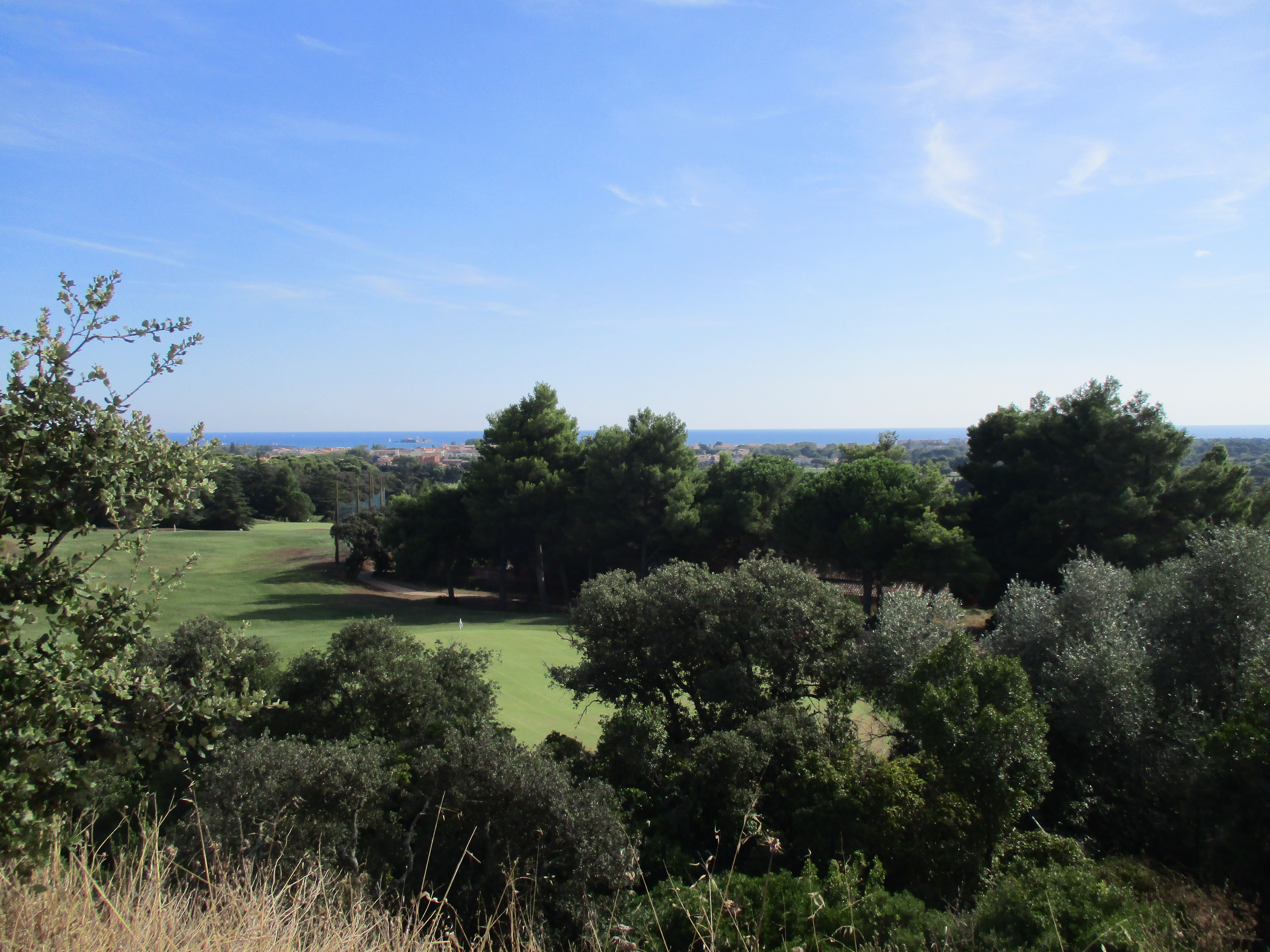
Agde golf course (seen from Mt St Martin, back to the housing estates)

== Museum ==
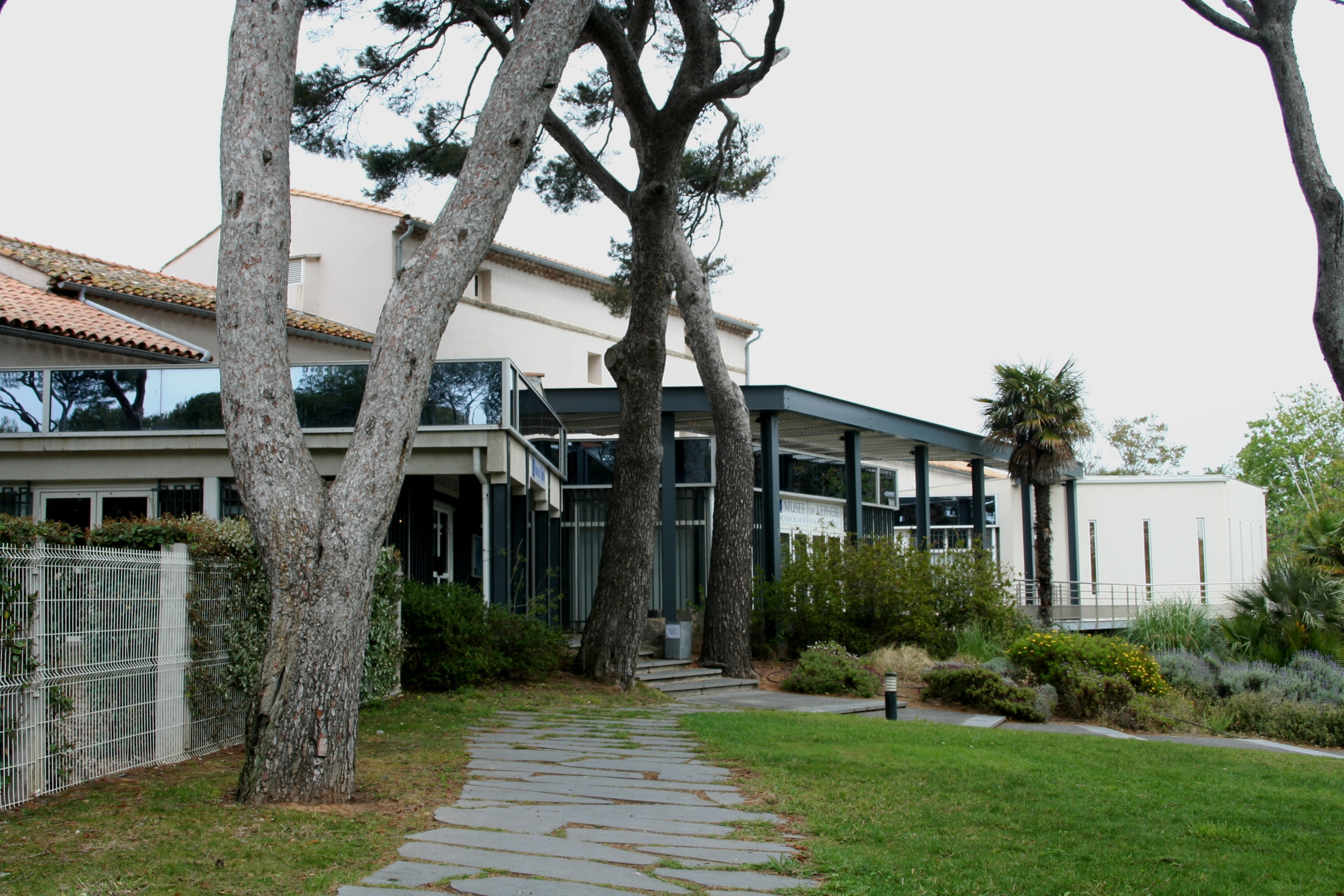
Ephebos museum.

The Musée de l'Ephèbe houses the bronze nude statue known as The Youth of Agde (l'Ephèbe d'Agde). The statue was discovered in the river Hérault and was housed in the Louvre Museum prior to suitable facilities being made available in Cap d'Agde to house it.

== Elementary school ==
In the same way and for the same reasons as for Grau d'Agde and for Tamarissière, in 1956 mayor Louis Vallière will open in the renovated [former farm] located on the Clape estate the first school in Cap d'Agde (where the Musée de l'Ephèbe is now located). Urban planners have forecast 2,500 sedentary residents at Cap d'Agde. Due to the particular nature of the environment, the project will be managed by SEBLI and the chosen architect, the Cap d'Agde architect Jean Lecouteur. Due to Museum construction, the "Jules Verne" Elementary school is built between 1976 and 1980.

== Arena ==
Aside the antique villa d'Ambonne, on the land of the old farm, à completely new project for an arena in Agde, in use since 1974, a concrete building for open air shows.

== Church Saint-Benoît ==
A Catholic church was built on a model adapted to the seasonal affluence: its right wing is formed by high bay windows that open onto a courtyard in which pews are placed for the faithful. The rite is ecumenical. Church was built right next to the ruins of the Villa Embonne (a wheat mill), the first Greek settlement (next to the contemporan arena and Clape museum).

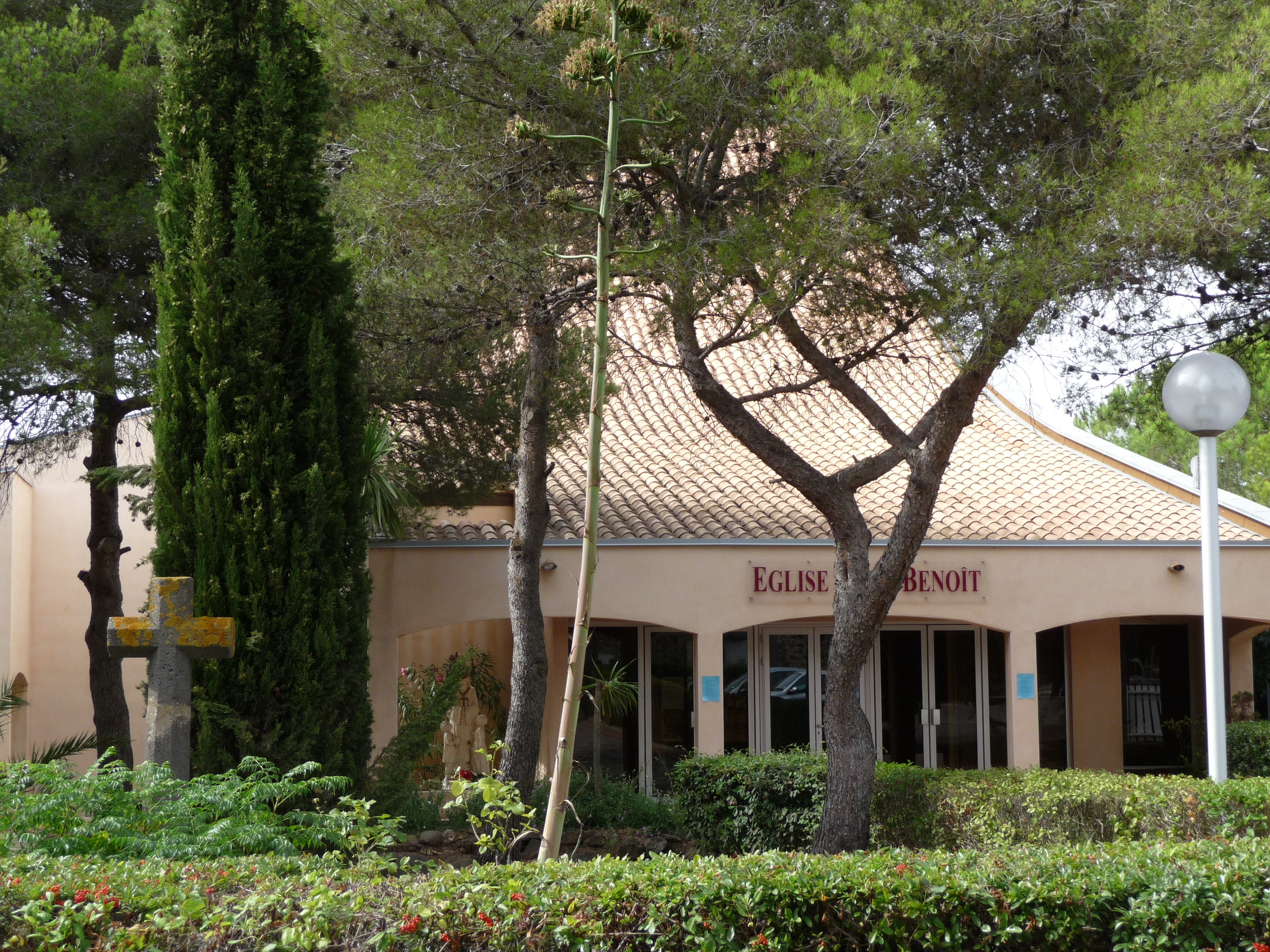
Church's entrance.

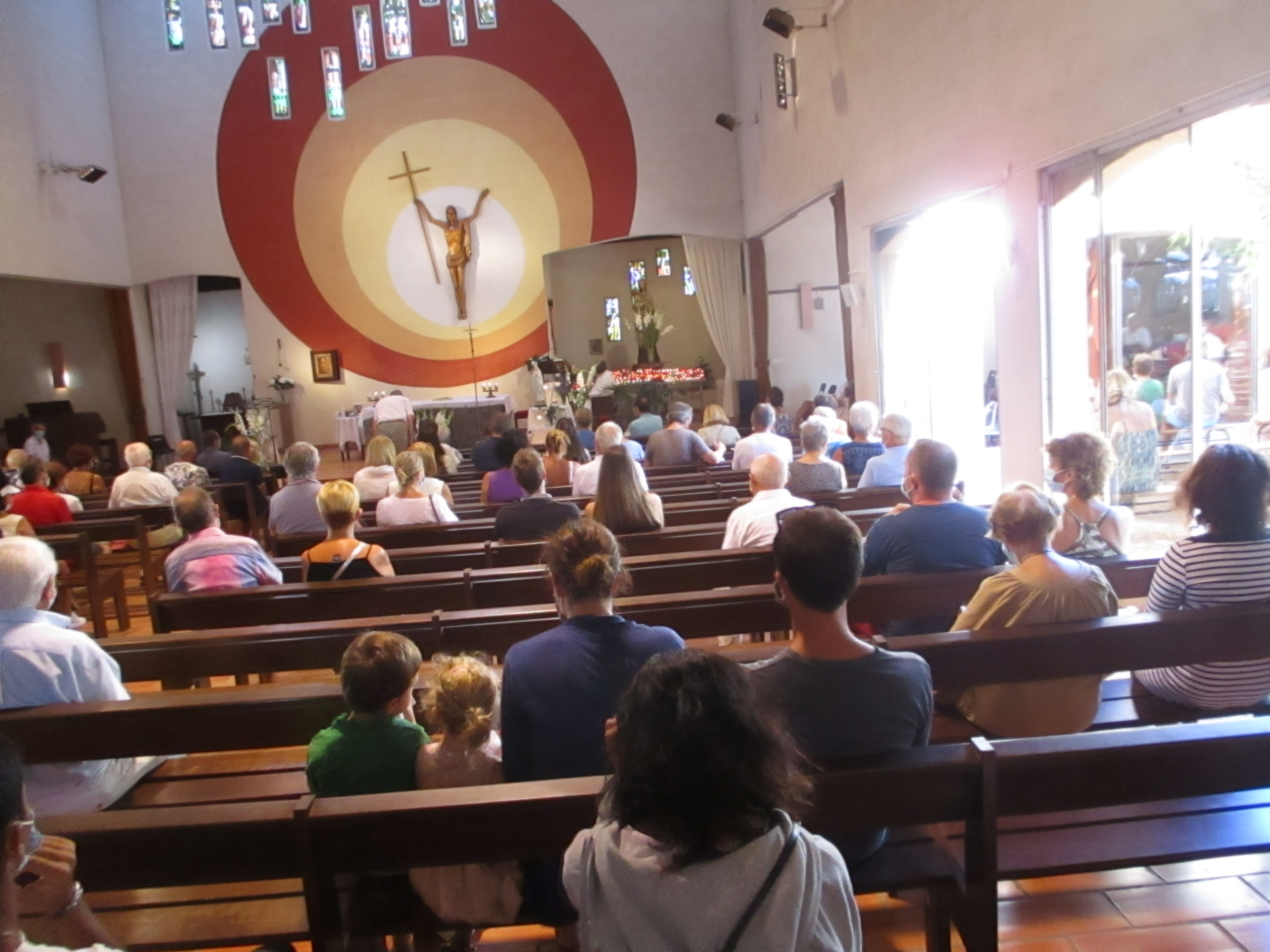
Inside the church, east wing of transept opening onto courtyard.

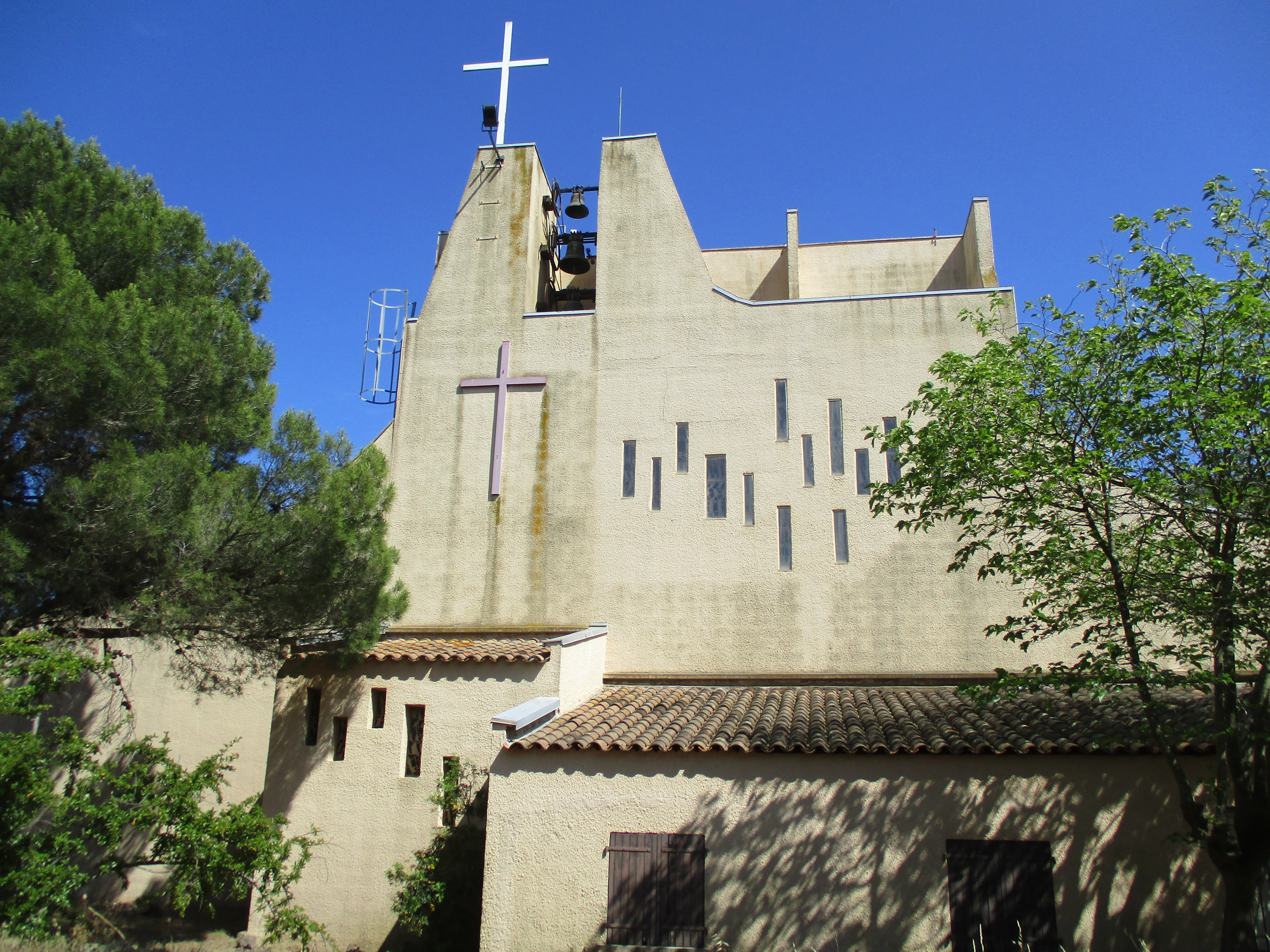
Church of Saint Benedict cross campanile stained glass windows 1975.

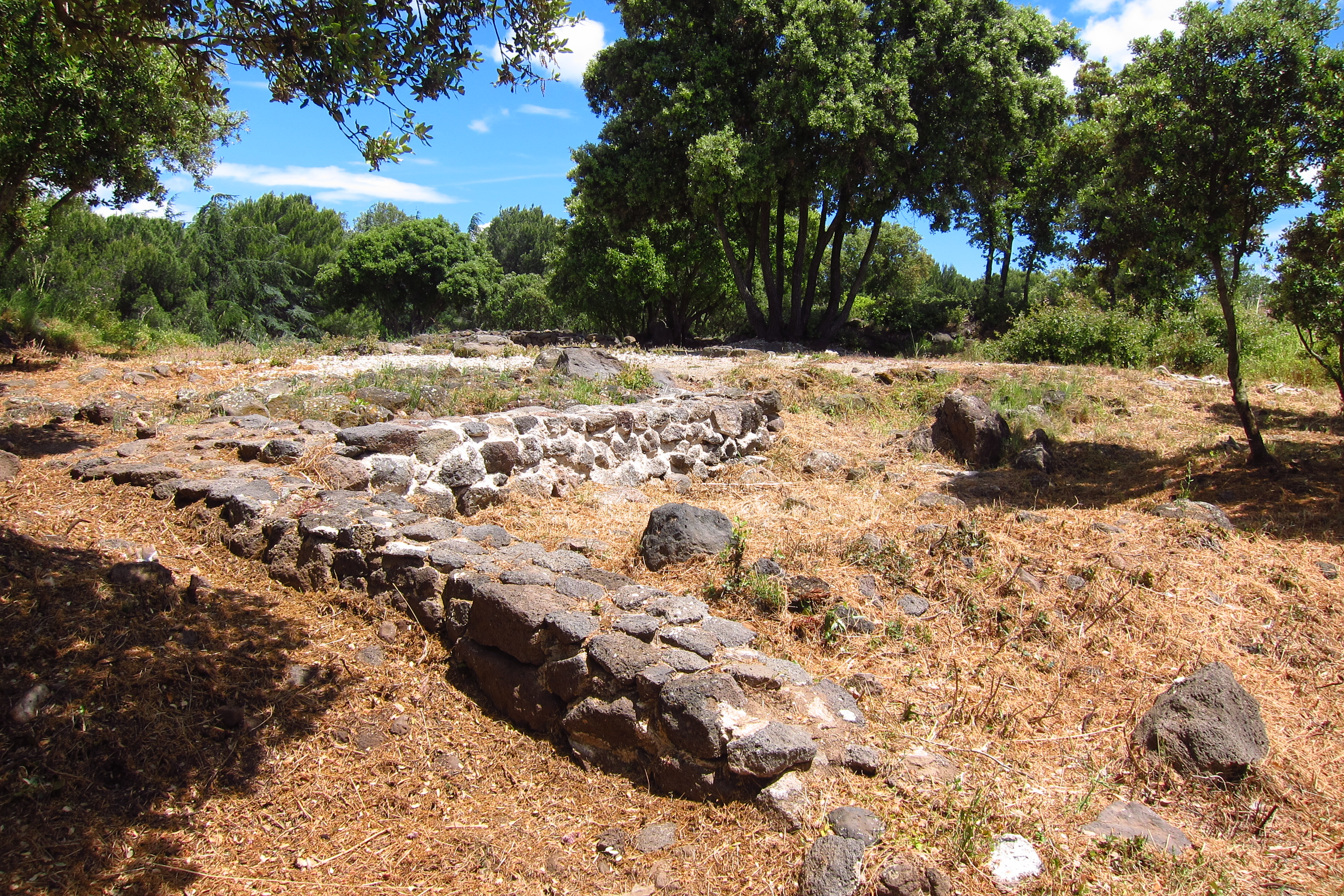
Villa d'Embonne in La Clape next to the arena and the church of Saint-Benoît.

== Naturist village ==
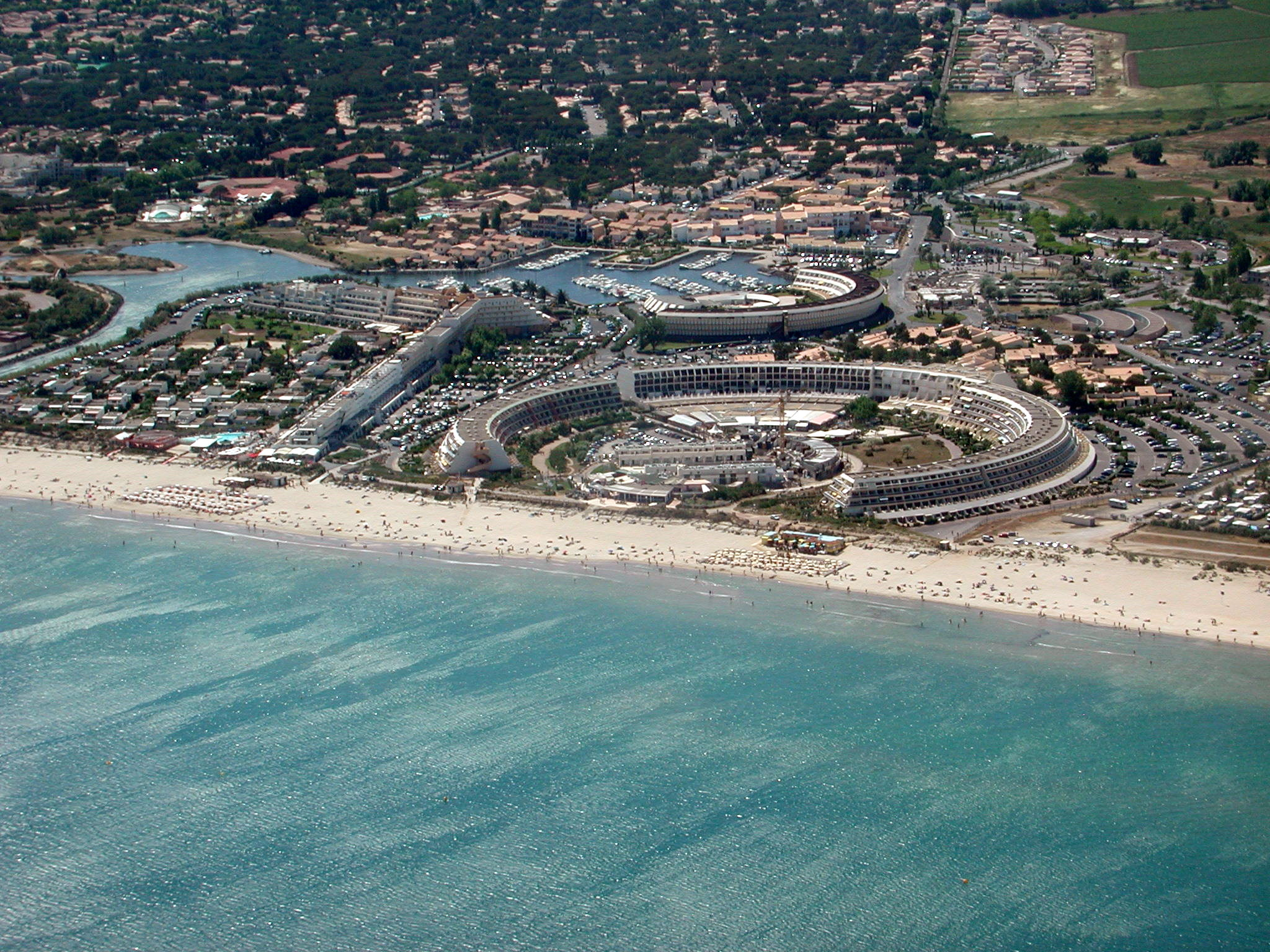
Village Naturiste without campsite

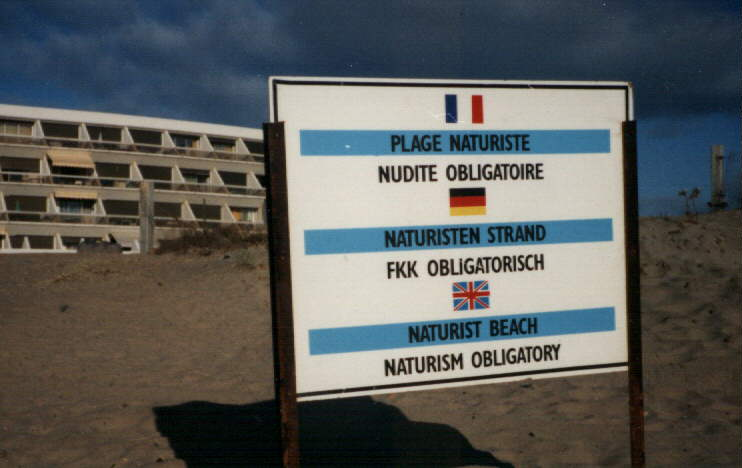
Sign on the beach at Cap d'Agde

Cap d'Agde has a large naturist resort. The naturist village encompasses a significant area along the eastern coast of Cap d'Agde.(43°17′42″N 03°31′38″E) It is built on private land, replaces the former campsite. It does not follow municipal planning directives of the Mission Racine : shaped volumes rules) which exclude large architectural complexes with no local architecture references for roof or walls. It is fenced-off with an entrance gate, and it is also accessible along the public beach from the north. It is a self-contained town (sometimes referred to as the "Naked City"), where nudity is both legal and common. The Naturist Village is becoming a hotspot for swingers and libertines. It has a 2 km (1 mi) beach, a large marina, places for 2,500 campers, apartment complexes, hotel, shops, restaurants, night clubs, bars, post office, bank, ATMs, launderettes, hairdressers, and other facilities.

=== History of local naturism ===
The land adjoining the long sandy beach at Cap d'Agde was owned for many years by the winemaker Oltra family who farmed the olive groves behind the sand dunes adjoining the beach. After World War II, in 1950s, the Oltra brothers noticed that people were coming in increasing numbers to camp on their land, for bathing and sunbathing nude. The Oltra brothers began to formalise arrangements for campers on their land, and this subsequently led to the creation of a caravanning and camping resort, called the Oltra Club. The camp grew increasingly popular, especially with young families and German and Dutch tourists.

In 1960s the government of Georges Pompidou drew up plans for the development of the Languedoc-Roussillon coastline. Naturism initially had no part in these proposals, but Paul René Oltra, one of the brothers, persuaded the authorities to include plans for a naturist resort at Cap d'Agde. In 1973 the beach was officially designated as a naturist beach. Regulations for the new resort were also promulgated. The Naturist Village would be a place where voyeurs and exhibitionists would not be welcome.

=== Early developments ===
The first development was the construction of flats, shops and pools at Port Nature and Port Ambonne. Later, Heliopolis and Port Venus were built and Port Nature was considerably extended. The flats were sold and the owners often let them when they did not require them for their own use. The Naturist Village became a controlled zone during the season with regulated access. Everyone entering was informed of the regulations and required to comply with them.

=== 1980s ===
By the early 1980s, the Naturist Village was reaching the limit of its development. Many shops and commercial premises remained empty, ready for sale or lease. The election of the government of François Mitterrand was to herald a cooling off of the French economy which lasted well into the following decade. During this time the Naturist Village continued to prove a popular resort and it developed a relaxed and pleasant atmosphere. There were so many German visitors that the Post Office even had a designated postbox for letters and postcards being sent to Germany.

=== 21st century ===
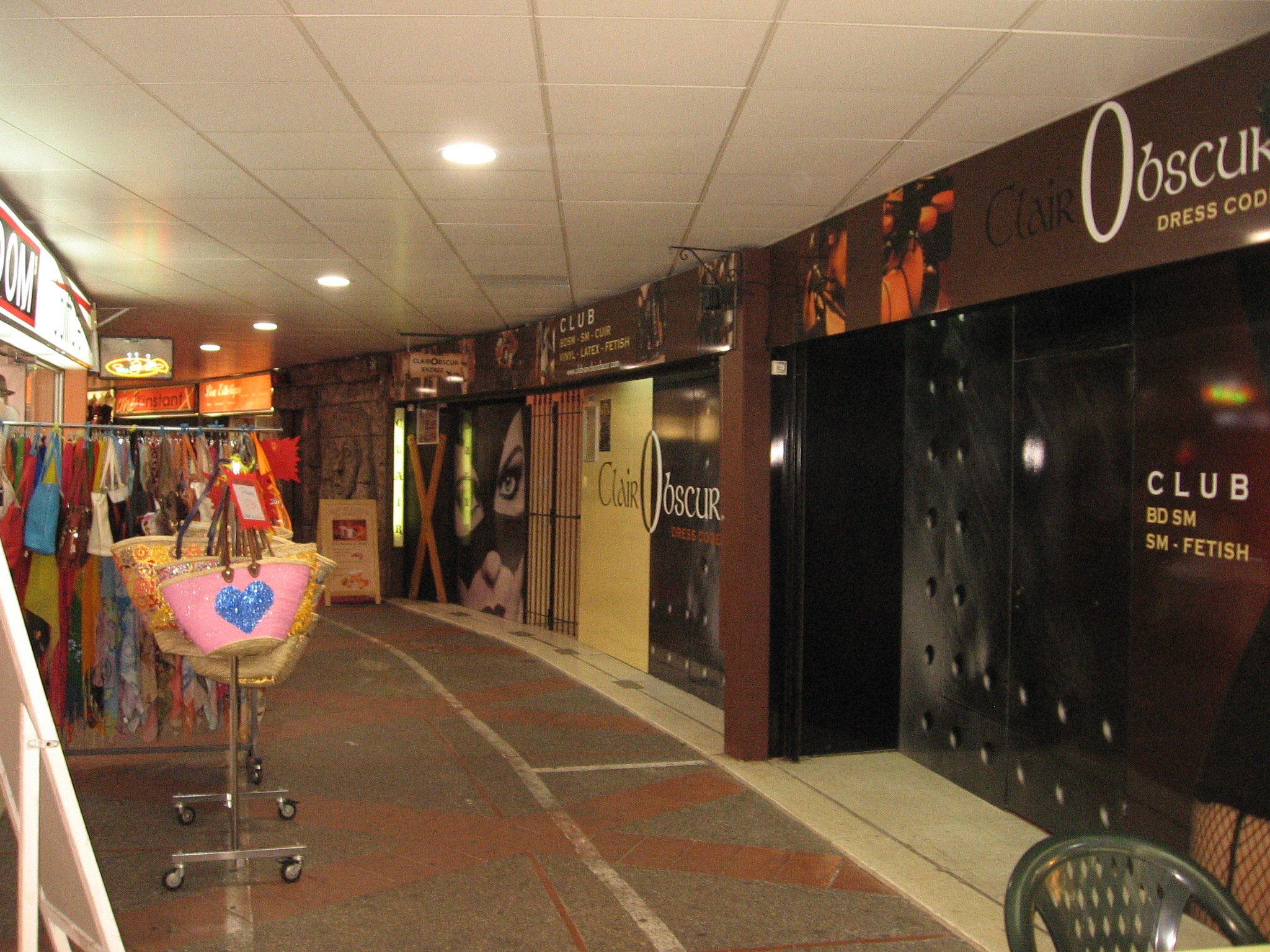
A BDSM club in a shopping complex, Cap d'Agde

The naturist village is also becoming a hotspot for swingers and libertines, with sex-shops and swinger clubs. The swingers are also active on the naturist beaches, which has made many naturist tourists change destination to family friendly naturist resorts. The nickname is "La baie des cochons" (Bay of Pigs).

The naturist village has rules which require nudity as the norm, and which ban photography, the wearing of provocative clothing and the display of indecent items. In 2008, signs were put on display on the beach warning against lewd behaviour. The nightlife centres around clubs and venues. Many open only at certain times of the year. On 23 November 2008, the British newspaper The Sunday Times suggested that fires at three swingers clubs were started by hard-line naturists, or 'nudist mullahs', who oppose the echangistes or libertines. In 2009, René Oltra, the company that bears the name of the resort's original promoter, required that visitors to its campsite, villas and flats belong to a naturist organisation. However, because of abuses, Cap d'Agde is no longer registered with or supported by the Fédération Française de Naturisme.

In December 2009, the local authority proposed renovations that would make the village almost traffic-free. These renovations involved the construction of tree-lined walkways and promenades, a raised promenade by the beach, and a hotel. Work was to start in early 2012. Other plans included the renovation of buildings and the construction of new façades. The naturist village creates employment and revenue in a region of France less affluent than others. It creates income for the local authority through property taxes and admission prices. In September 2020, in the first year of the COVID-19 pandemic, it was reported that a testing station outside the village found 30% of 800 naturists tested positive for COVID-19. Under normal circumstances at the time—much reduced during the early pandemic–the village itself held 10,000 campsite pitches and 15,000 beds, a population density seven times greater than nearby Montpellier.

=== Naturist beach ===
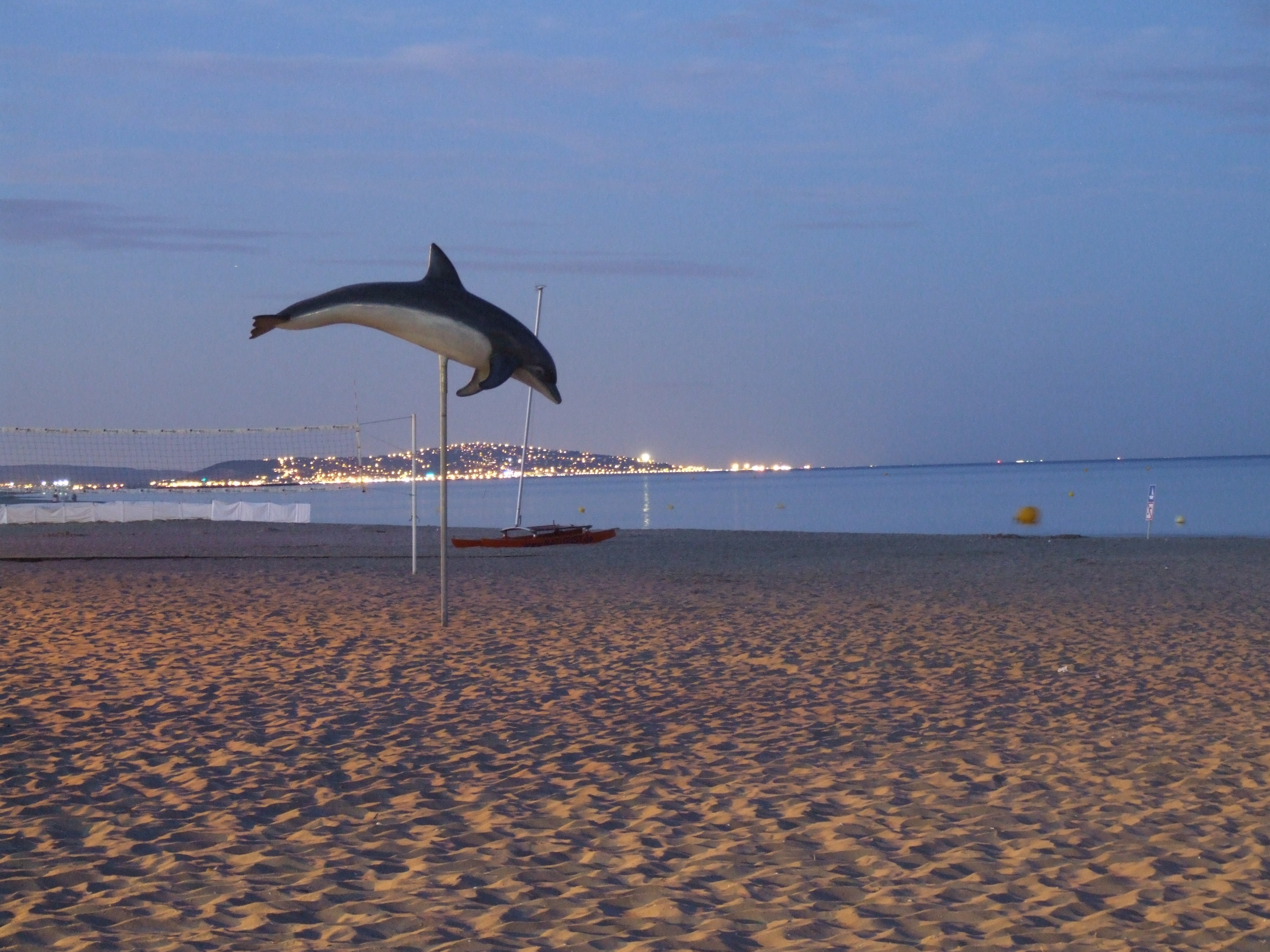
Nudist beach in Cap d'Agde at night, with the town of Sète in the background

The naturist beach, where nudity is technically mandatory, is about 2 kilometres (1 mile) long and 30 metres (100 feet) wide. Sand and water are of good quality with the temperature of the latter varying from 16 to 22 °C (61 to 72 °F). The nudist part is easily accessible from the north but not from the south with the Port Lano entrance. Two security posts feature police and medical facilities. Six restaurants border the southern end while there is one restaurant towards the northern end. Most service staff speak English.

== See also ==
- Wreck of Rochelongue

=== See also for naturism ===
- CHM Montalivet
- Euronat
- Levant Island
- List of French naturist beaches (In French)
- List of social nudity places in France, Europe
- Naturism
- Naturism in France
- Platais Island
