= The Youth of Agde =

Ancient bronze statue found in France

Coordinates: 43°18′43″N 3°28′08″E

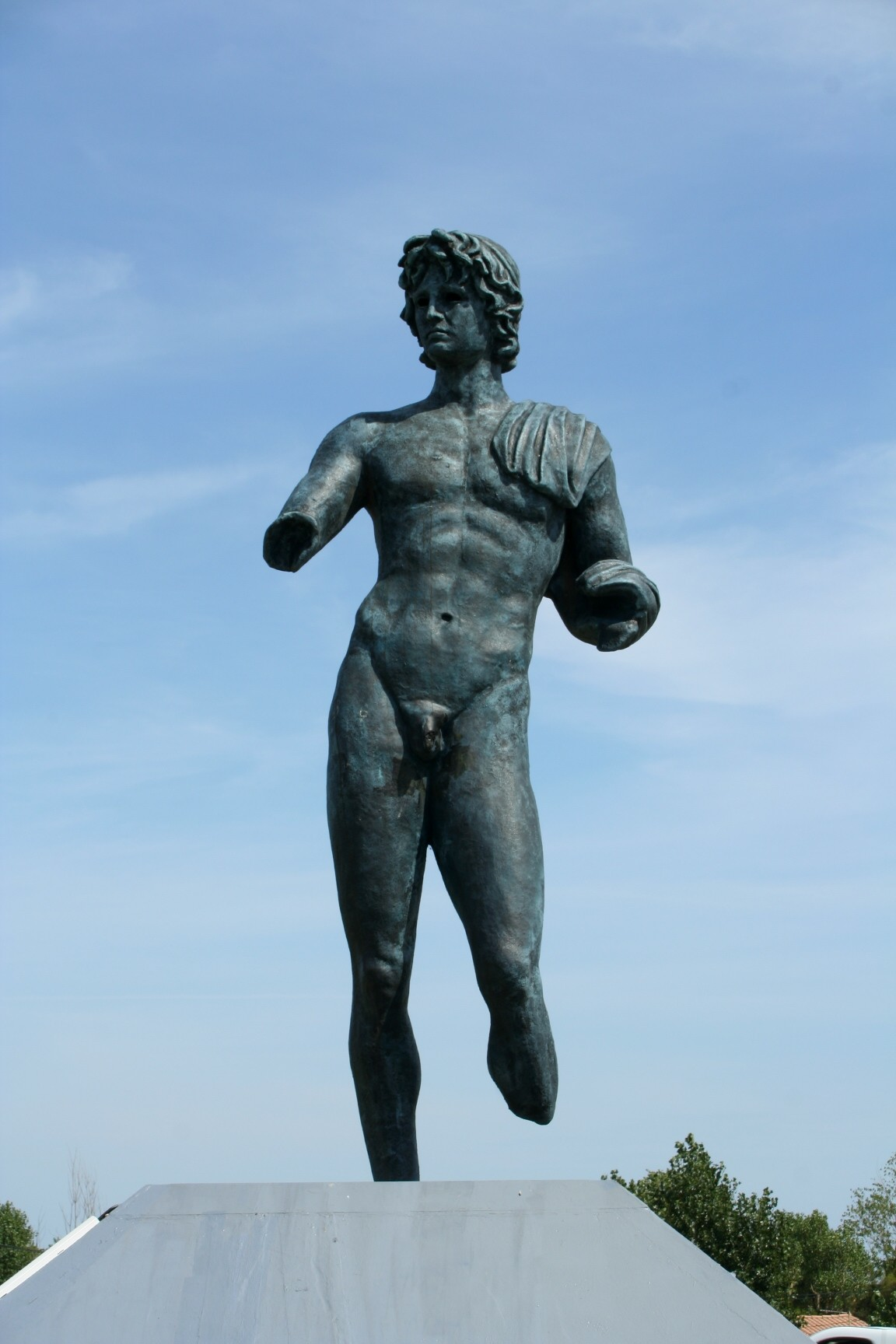
Copy of the Éphebé at Rochelongue

The Youth of Agde (l'Éphèbe d'Agde) is a bronze statue discovered on September 13, 1964, on the bed of the river Herault on the south-eastern coast of France, by Denis Fanquerle and divers from the Agde Marine Archaeological Research Group. It is probably associated with an ancient Greek shipwreck.

Standing at a height of 1.33 meters (4 ft 4 in), the statue is in bronze and dated to the 2nd century BC (late Hellenistic period). It depicts a young man, probably a ruler. His features resemble those of Lysippos' Doryphoros, suggesting that its creator was a student of the master sculptor.

The statue is in poor condition due to its immersion in the Herault Estuary for so many years. The surface of the bronze is corroded, and the lower half of both arms and both feet are missing. One foot was found six months after the initial discovery, about 600 meters (yards) away from the original find, buried under 1.5 meters (5 feet) of silt deposits on the river bed. The rest of the parts have yet to be located.

The Youth of Agde, for the first fifteen years of its second life on land, resided in the storage rooms of the Louvre. It is now on display at the Agde Museum.
