= Christian naturism =

Practise of naturism or nudism by Christians

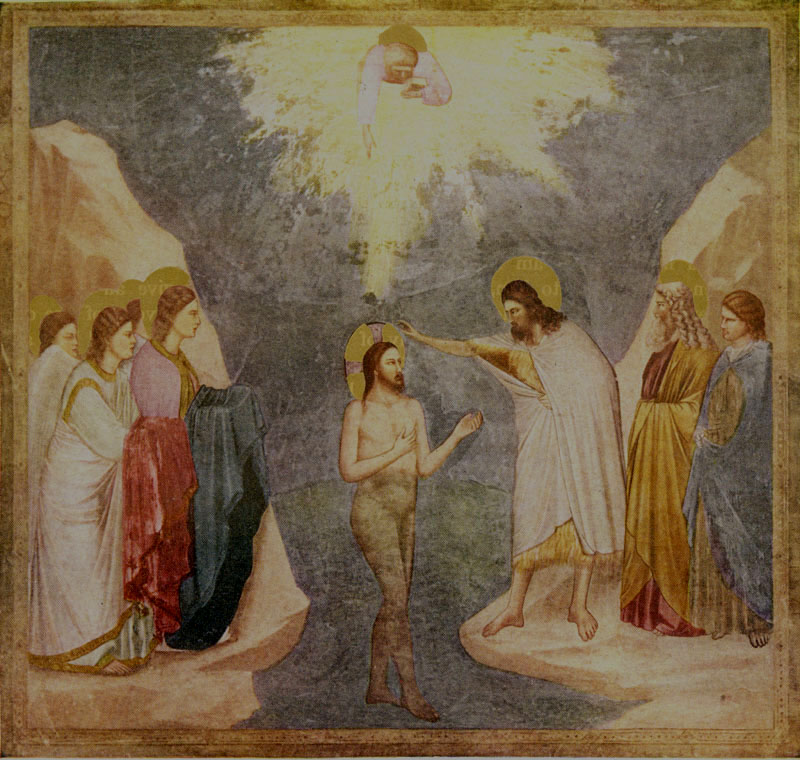
Baptism of Jesus, Bordone, Giotto 1276-1336

Christian naturism is the practise of naturism or nudism by Christians. (Note: This form of naturism is not to be confused with what Durkheim termed "naturism" as an explanation for the origin of religion)

Naturism is a lifestyle of non-sexual social nudity; the word also refers to the cultural movement which advocates and defends that lifestyle. It is not certain that Christian naturism exists in any formal organisations, however, there are informal (mostly online) networks of Christians who practise naturism.

Many of the early proponents of naturism were Christians. For example, authors such as Ilsley Boone, Henry S. Huntington and Elton Raymond Shaw were writers of books on naturism and on Christianity. The dean of St Paul's Cathedral, the Very Revd William Inge, known as Dean Inge, offered support to the cause of naturists in his support of the publishing of Maurice Parmelee's book, The New Gymnosophy: Nudity and the Modern Life.

== History ==
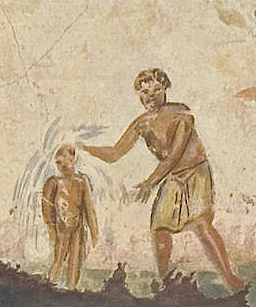
3rd-century baptism, St. Calixte Catacomb

=== Ancient ===
Originally, Jewish mikvahs, and later, early Christian baptisms were performed with individuals naked. This included mass baptisms involving men, women, and children. They signified the participant's restoration to man's original sinless condition, having their sins blotted out. Others claim that children were baptized first, then men, then women, all separately.

Public bathing was the common practice through the time of Jesus and still occurs today in a few cultures, including hammams, Victorian Turkish baths, the Finnish sauna, Japanese onsen or sentō, and the Korean jjimjilbang. With the exception of the family-focused Finnish sauna, most public baths are gender-segregated today. Entire families took part in the public bath—including Christians. Jesus even preached at the public baths in Jerusalem.

Some historic religious sects, both Christian and syncretist, have made nudism a general practice. Probably the best-known of these were the Adamites, though some of their beliefs were contrary to orthodox Christianity. The post-resurrection belief of the unclothed body being evil or sinful may originate in Platonic asceticism (founded largely on the works of ancient Greek philosopher Plato) which was adopted and passed down by "Christian" Platonists in early church history. Platonism is a dualistic theology which proposes a realm of forms to include, on the one hand, "pure ideas", which are good; and, on the other hand, "matter", which is evil. When applied to humans, the soul is necessarily good, and the body is necessarily evil. Therefore, according to this philosophy, our "evil" bodies must be covered by clothing. Christian naturists reject such notions as unbiblical.

=== Modern ===
In the United States, the Christian naturism movement (which was the first naturism movement of any sort in the U.S.) began in the late 1920s. This occurred at nearly the same time as the start of the Great Depression, under the leadership of New Jersey Dutch Reformed minister Ilsley Boone. Initially, he was vice president of the American League for Physical Culture. By October 1931, Boone had taken over as president, and renamed the club as the "American Sunbathing Association" (ASA). Soon, naturism began expanding nationwide.

With the beginning of the modern internet in the mid-1990s, Christian Naturism became much more organized in the U.S. than ever before. The website Naturist-Christians.org founded in 1999 is the largest website devoted exclusively to Christian naturism. Annual Christian Nudist Convocations began early in the decade of the 2000s.

==== Vatican ====
In Rome, Pope Pius XI strongly condemned the naturism movement throughout the early 1930s, calling it "paganly immodest". This prompted the head of the New York Legion of Decency, former New York Catholic Governor and presidential candidate Alfred E. Smith, to try to outlaw all nudism. A recent court ruling had declared private social nudity to be legal per current law. Eventually, their efforts failed in the state legislature. After Boone's passing in the late 1960s, the ASA became more secular, along with American society in general. In 1994, the ASA was renamed as the American Association for Nude Recreation (AANR), which has its headquarters in Florida.

Pope John Paul II began his papacy in 1978, becoming the first non-Italian pope in four and a half centuries. His views on naturism differed substantially from that of his predecessors. Authoring the book Love and Responsibility (1981), he wrote: "Nakedness itself is not immodest [...] Immodesty is present only when nakedness plays a negative role with regard to the value of the person, when its aim is to arouse concupiscence, as a result of which the person is put in the position of an object for enjoyment".

=== Nudity and historical Christian sects ===
- Adamites – A sect in North Africa in the 2nd through 4th century that believed they were "re-establishing Adam and Eve's innocence".
- Naaktloopers ('naked walkers') – A group of 11 Anabaptists in Amsterdam who, on February 11, 1535, stripped and ran naked through the streets proclaiming the "naked truth". They were later executed.
- Sons of Freedom – Canadian Doukhobors who performed protests, long treks to return to Russia, some in the nude, to protest materialism.

== Bible passages involving nudity ==
=== The Garden of Eden ===
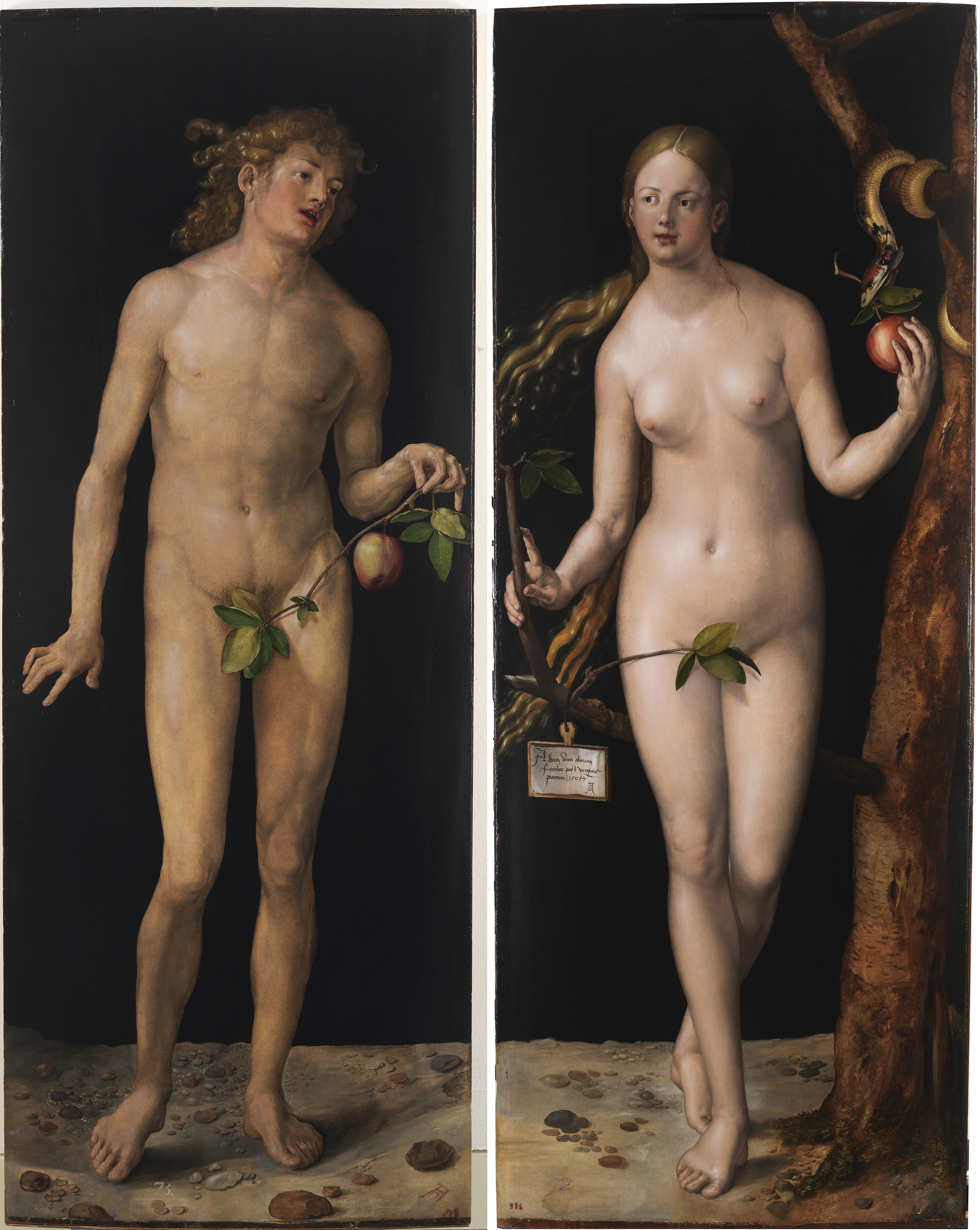
Adam and Eve, by Albrecht Dürer (1507)

Christian naturists view the story of the Garden of Eden as a model for their beliefs. It is also the main scripture where their interpretation disagrees with denominations where clothing is required. When Adam and Eve were created and placed in the garden as a couple by God, they were both naked and "felt no shame". (Genesis 2:25) Although in the English of today the word naked often does imply shame or lewdness, when the King James Version (KJV) was released in 1611, naked (of Germanic origin), and nude (of Latin origin) were synonymous terms. The KJV uses naked 47 times in 45 verses throughout the Bible, while nude does not appear once. No major English translation of the Bible uses nude in Genesis 2:25 either.

Christian naturists see Adam and Eve being in the blameless state that God had intended them to be. God knew that they were naked, as this was how he had created them, in his image. Even before Eve's creation, God had warned Adam "but you must not eat from the tree of the knowledge of good and evil, for when you eat of it you will surely die" (Genesis 2:17). Despite God's warning, first Eve, then Adam, eat the forbidden fruit after being persuaded by the devil in the form of a serpent. After doing so, they realize that they are naked, and sew fig leaves together as coverings in a futile attempt to hide their loss of innocence.

Shortly thereafter, Adam and Eve hear God walking in the garden, which results with them fearfully hiding among the trees. God queries Adam, "Where are you?" In spite of the fig leaves, Adam replies that he is afraid because of his nakedness. God further asks Adam, "Who told you that you were naked?" Only God, Adam, Eve, and the devil were a party to this matter; therefore, Christian naturists believe it was the devil who told Adam and Eve that they were naked. Their shame was not of God; nor would the fig leaves cover this shame, regardless of their genitals being covered. God was displeased not only by their disobedience of eating the forbidden fruit, but also with Adam and Eve's subsequent attempt to cover up their bodies.

Christian naturists maintain the fig leaves were worn in a futile attempt to hide what the couple had done from God—not each other, noting they were married, and equally guilty of the same original sin. The second sin was to cover parts of the body. The devil had chosen the sexual organs as the area of shame because, unlike God, he has no ability to create life. As the next chapter begins with Adam and Eve engaging in appropriate marital sexual relations, they conclude the couple would have seen each other naked subsequent to the fall of mankind.

After the Fall, God expelled Adam and Eve from the Garden of Eden. He also made more durable and protective garments from animal skins to replace the fig leaves before sending them out among the thorns.

=== Other scripture ===
Painting Madonna and Child with St. Anne showing Christ unashamed to be naked, being without sin. The Virgin Mary is with her mother. Caravaggio, 1606

There are other references to nudity in the Bible, such as:

- 1 Samuel 19:24: "He (Saul) stripped off his robes and also prophesied in Samuel's presence. He lay that way all that day and night. This is why people say, 'Is Saul also among the prophets?'"
- 2 Samuel 11: From the roof of his palace, King David saw Bathsheba—a married woman—bathing. David later committed adultery with Bathsheba, impregnated her, and arranged for her husband Uriah to die in battle.
- Isaiah 20:2–4: "The Lord said to Isaiah: 'Take off the sackcloth from your body and the sandals from your feet.' And he did so, going around stripped and barefoot. Then the Lord said, 'Just as my servant Isaiah has gone stripped and barefoot for three years, as a sign and portent against Egypt and Cush, so the king of Assyria will lead away stripped and barefoot the Egyptian captives and Cushite exiles, young and old, with buttocks bared—to Egypt's shame.'"
- Micah 1:8a (Micah speaking): "Because of this [Jacob's transgression] I will weep and wail; I will go about barefoot and naked."
- Matthew 6:25 and Luke 12:22–23: "Then Jesus said to his disciples: 'Therefore I tell you, do not worry about your life, what you will eat or drink; or about your body, what you will wear. Is not life more important than food, and the body more important than clothes?'"
- Mark 14:51–52: "A young man, wearing nothing but a linen garment, was following Jesus. When they seized him, he fled naked, leaving his garment behind."
- John 19:23–24: "When the soldiers crucified Jesus, they took his clothes, [...] 'Let's not tear [the undergarment],' they said to one another. 'Let's decide by lot who will get it.'"
- 2 Corinthians 5:1–4: "For we know that if the earthly tent we live in is destroyed, we have a building from God, an eternal house in heaven, not built by human hands. Meanwhile we groan, longing to be clothed instead with our heavenly dwelling, because when we are clothed, we will not be found naked. For while we are in this tent, we groan and are burdened, because we do not wish to be unclothed but to be clothed instead with our heavenly dwelling, so that what is mortal may be swallowed up by life."

Although no major Christian group accepts the Gospel of Thomas as canonical or authoritative (its translation was unavailable until the 20th century), it relates the following conversation between Jesus and his disciples:

His disciples asked, "When will you become revealed to us and when shall we see you?" Jesus answered, "When you disrobe without being ashamed and take up your garments and place them under your feet like little children and tread on them, then will you see the son of the Living One, and you will not be afraid."

=== Naked Christ ===
==== Birth ====
The story of the birth of Jesus is told in the gospels of Matthew and Luke. The Christian doctrine of incarnation holds that the second person of the Trinity "became flesh" by being conceived in the womb of Mary, and came into the world naked just like every other human being.

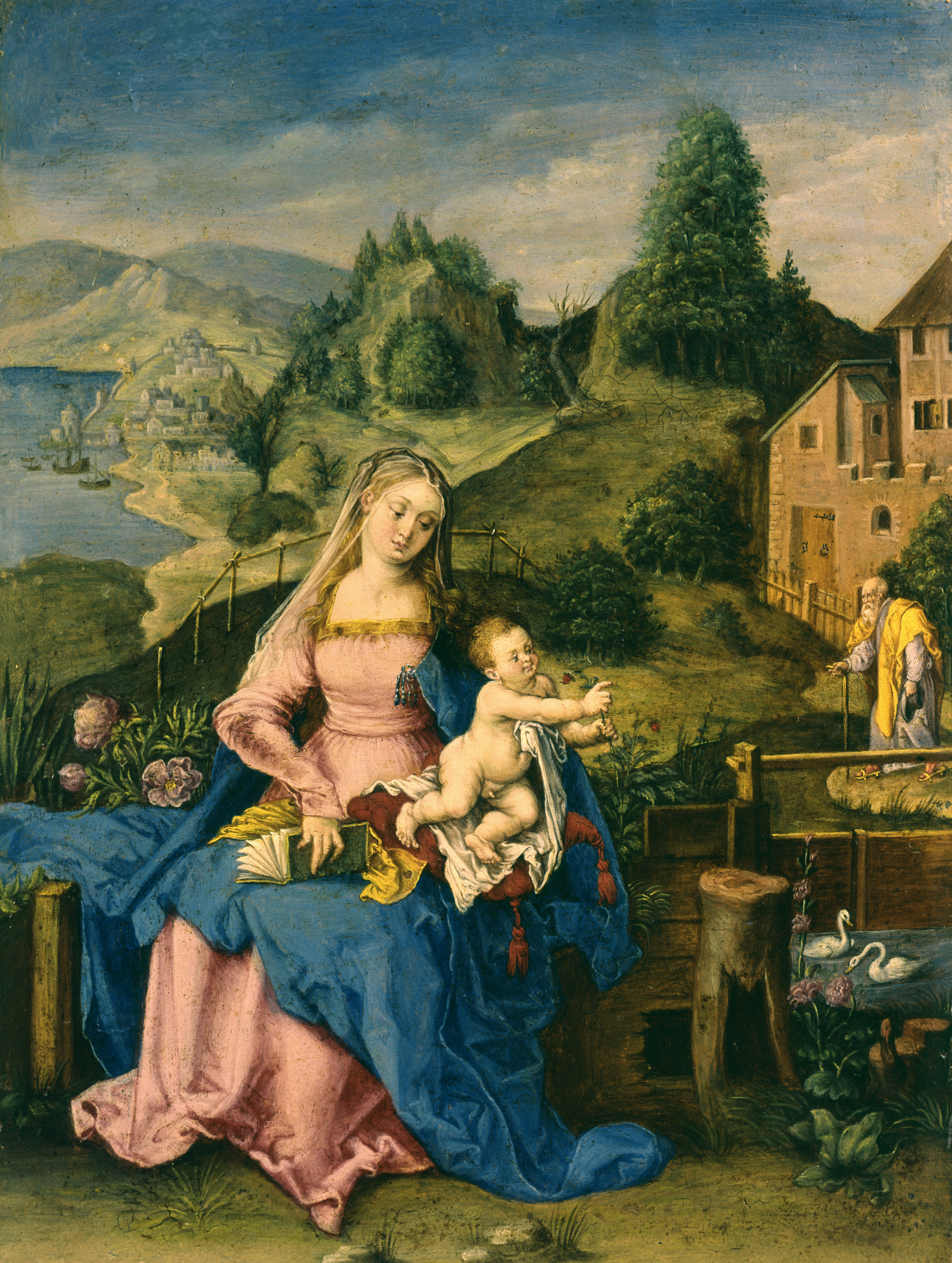
Virgin and Child in a Landscape by an anonymous artist

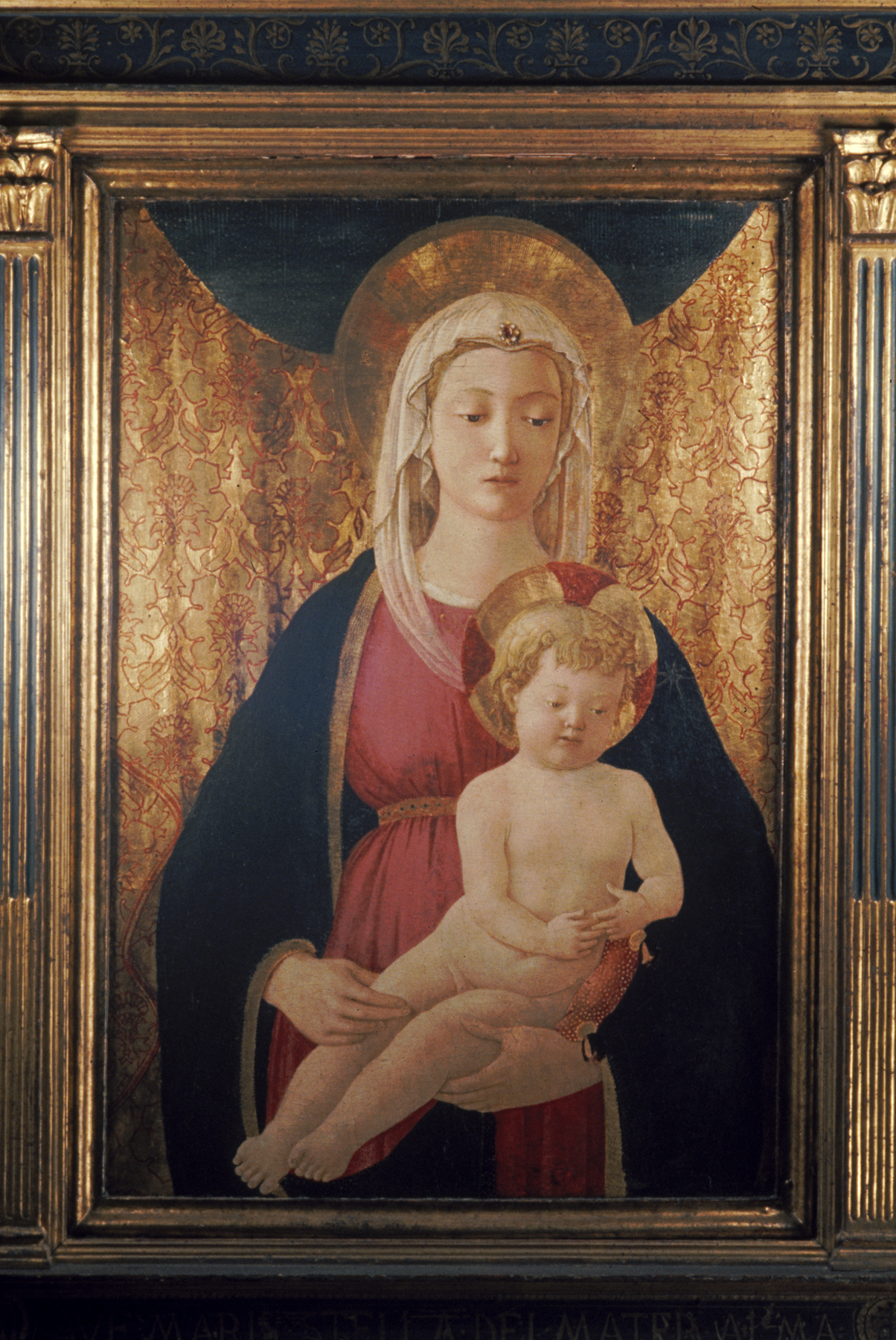
Madonna and Child by the Master of the Castello Nativity

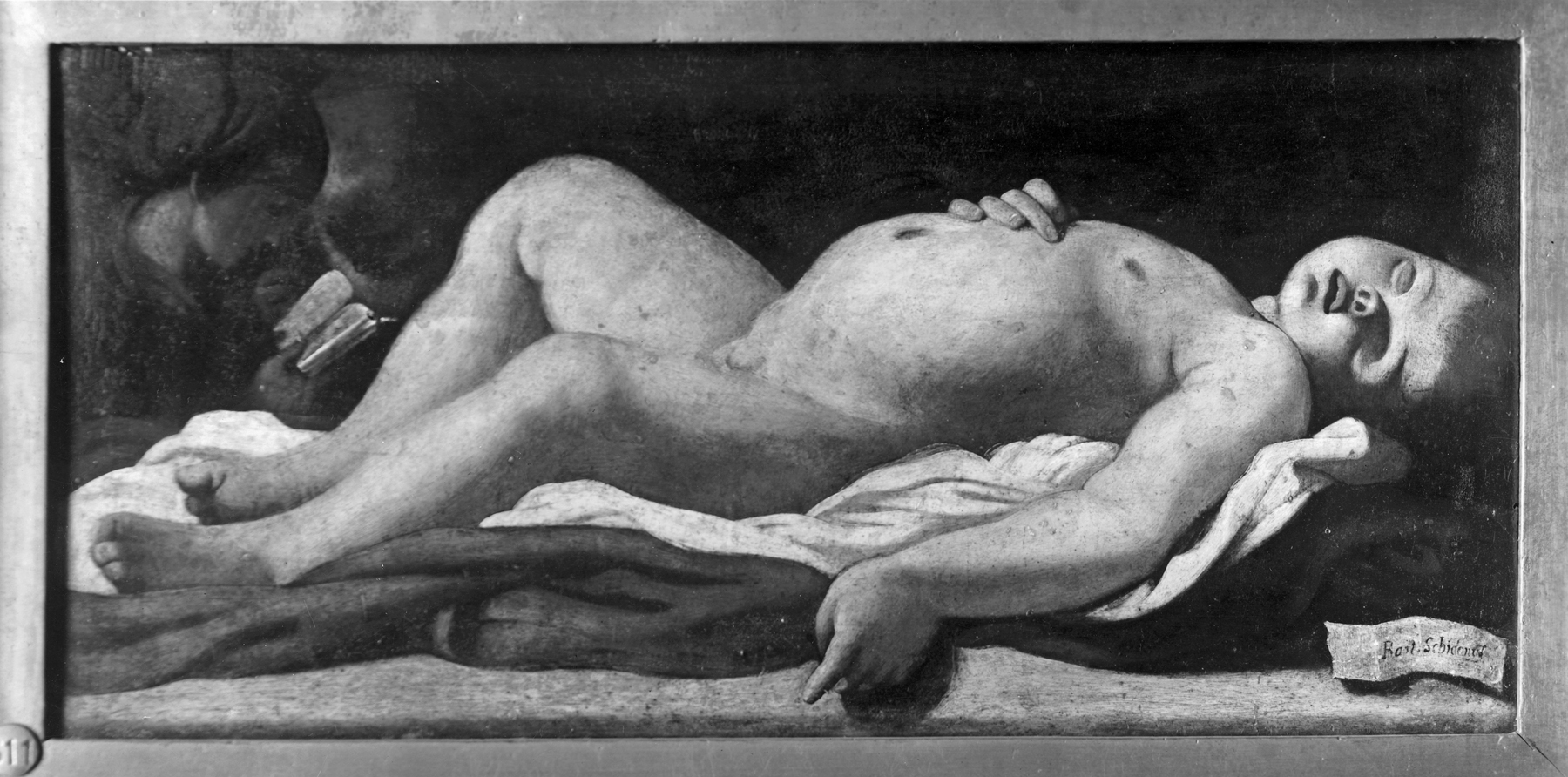
The Infant Christ Sleeping by Bartolomeo Schedoni

==== Baptism ====
Jesus was baptised by John the Baptist in the River Jordan. Jesus was almost certainly naked when he was baptised. The early Christian liturgy of baptism required those being baptised to be completely naked.

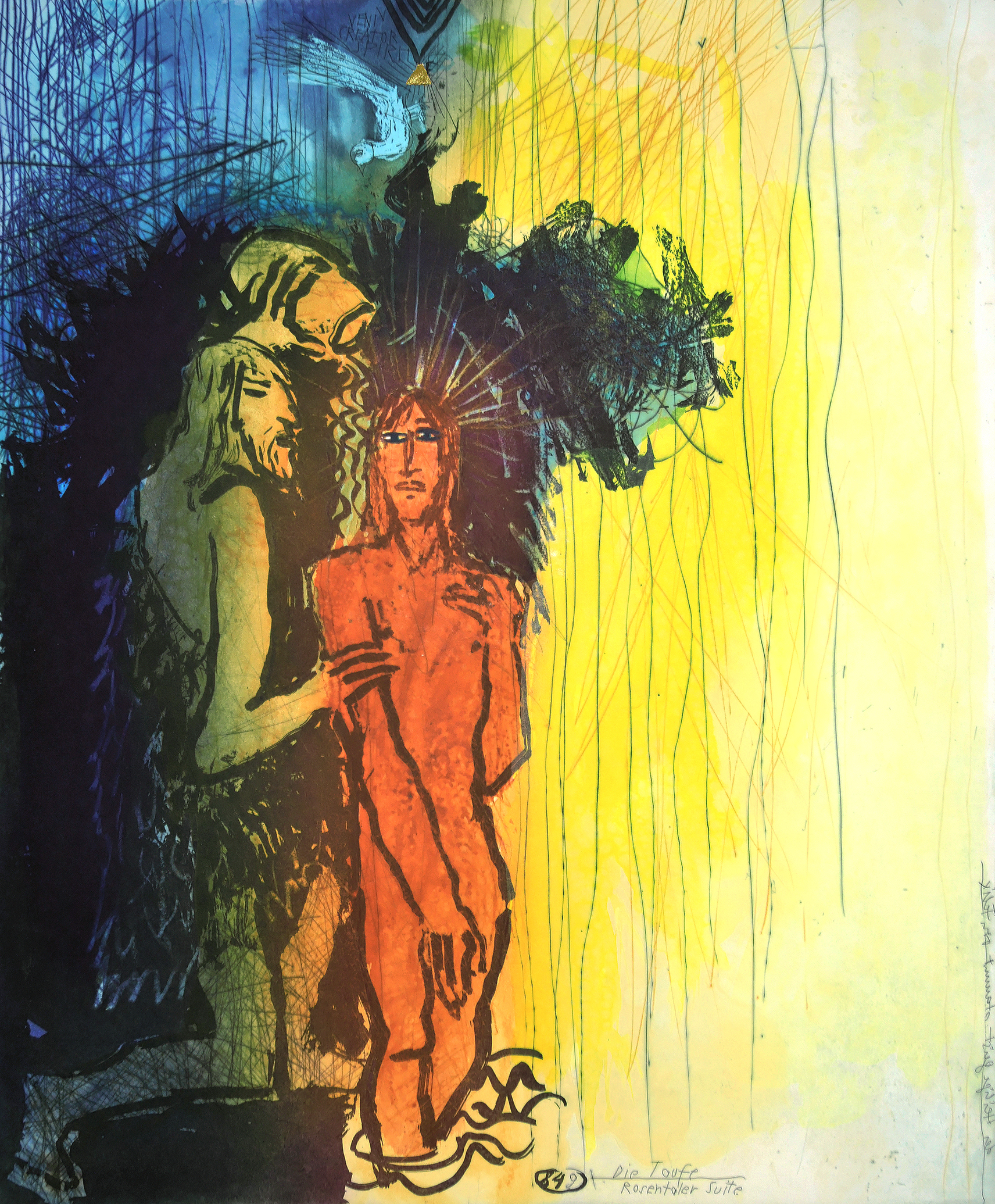
by Adi Holzer

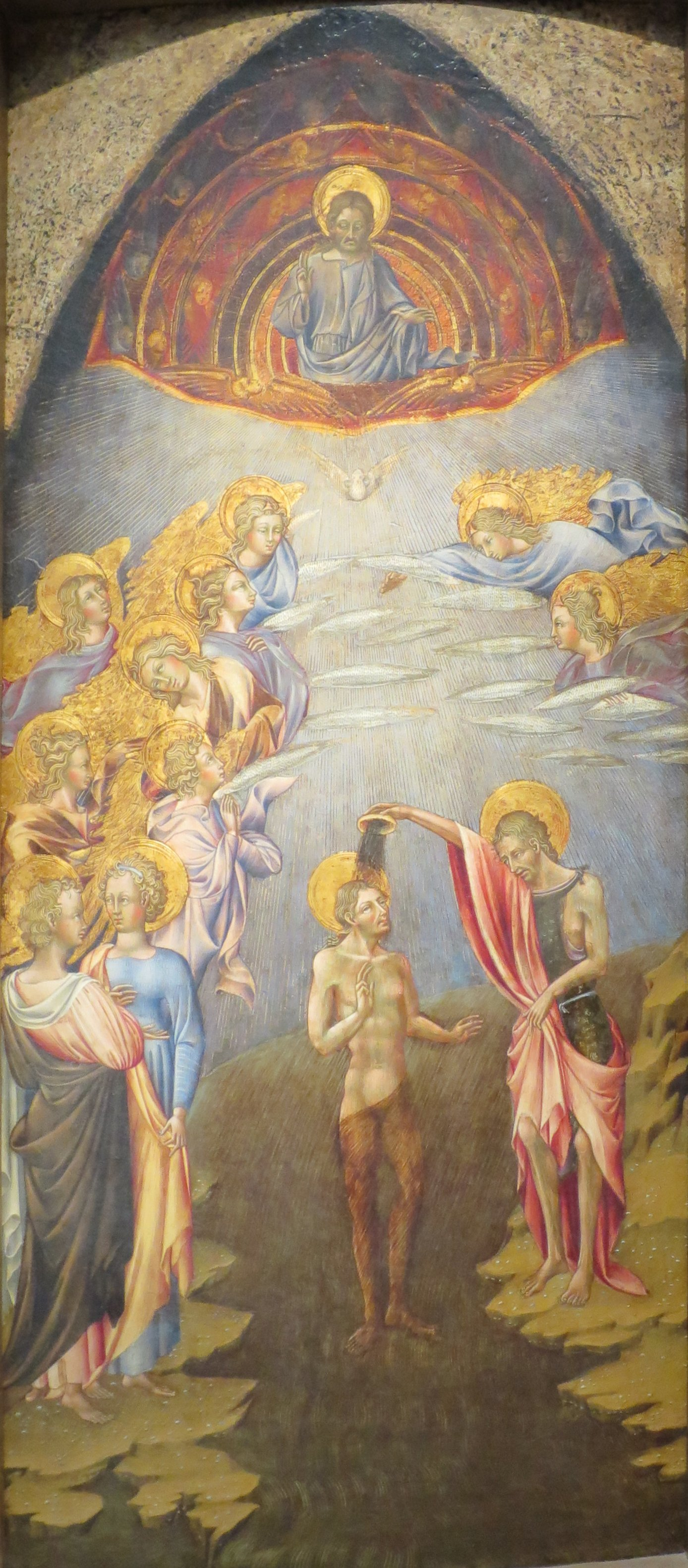
by Giovanni di Paolo

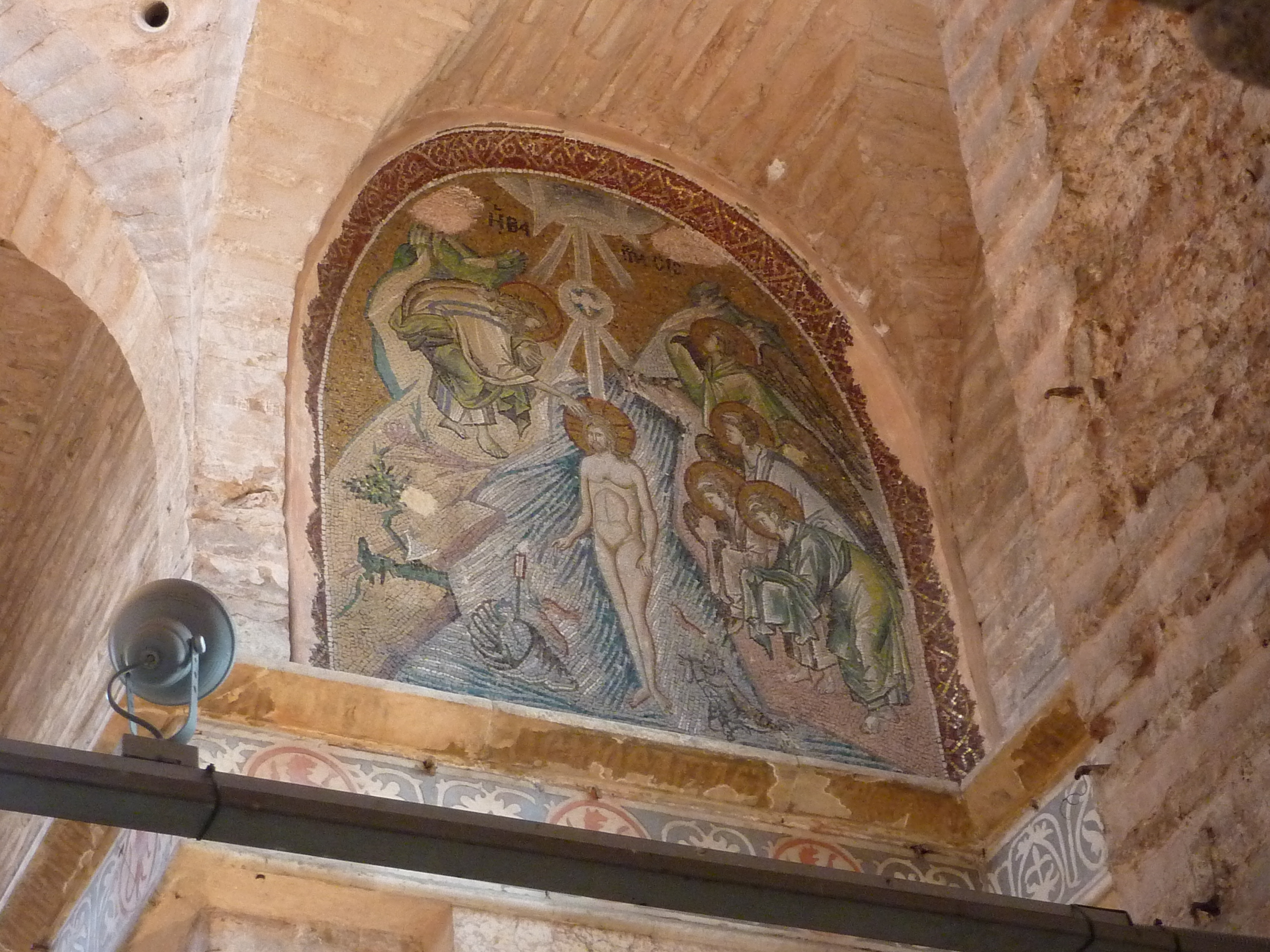
in the Pammakaristos Church

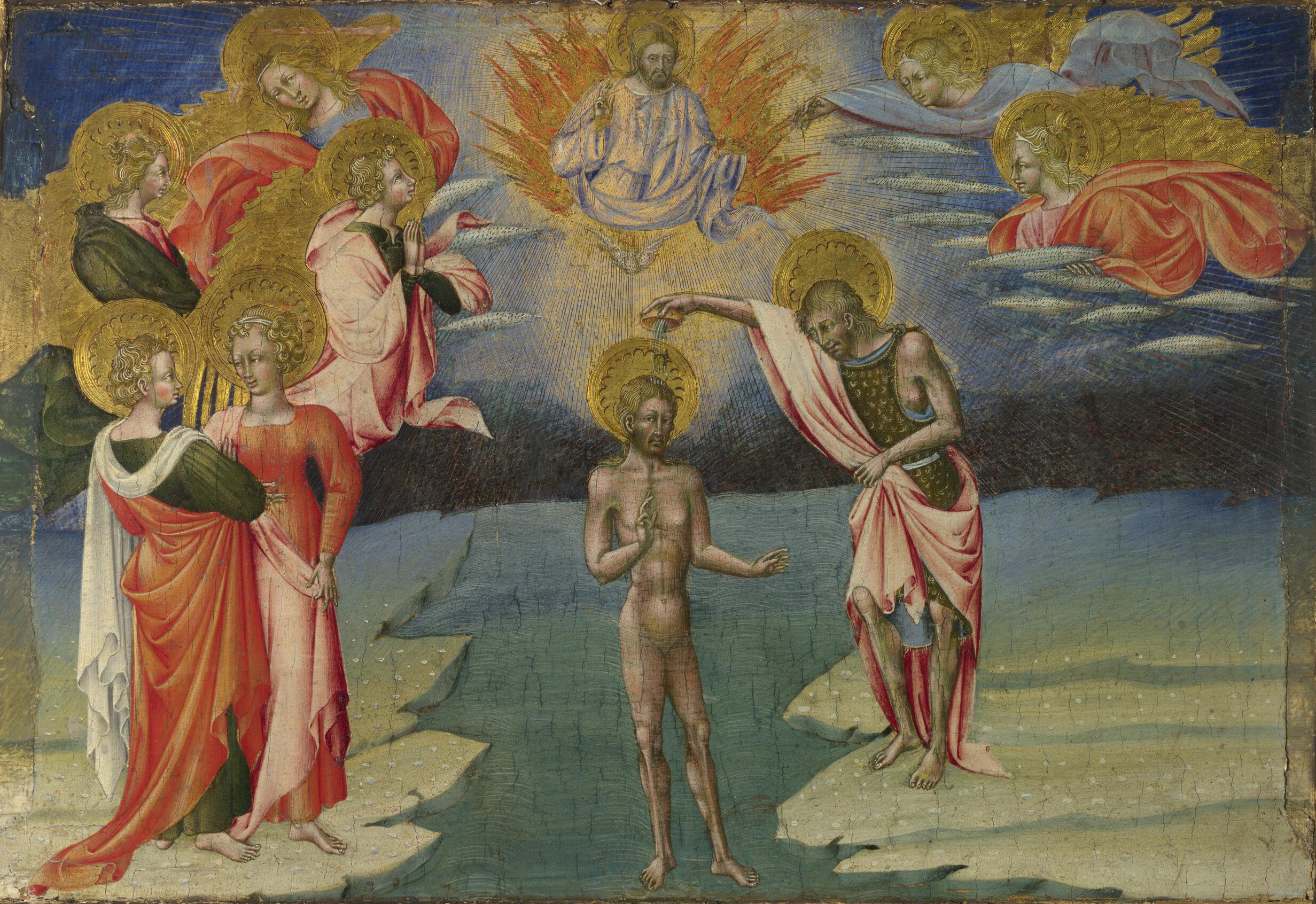
by Giovanni di Paolo

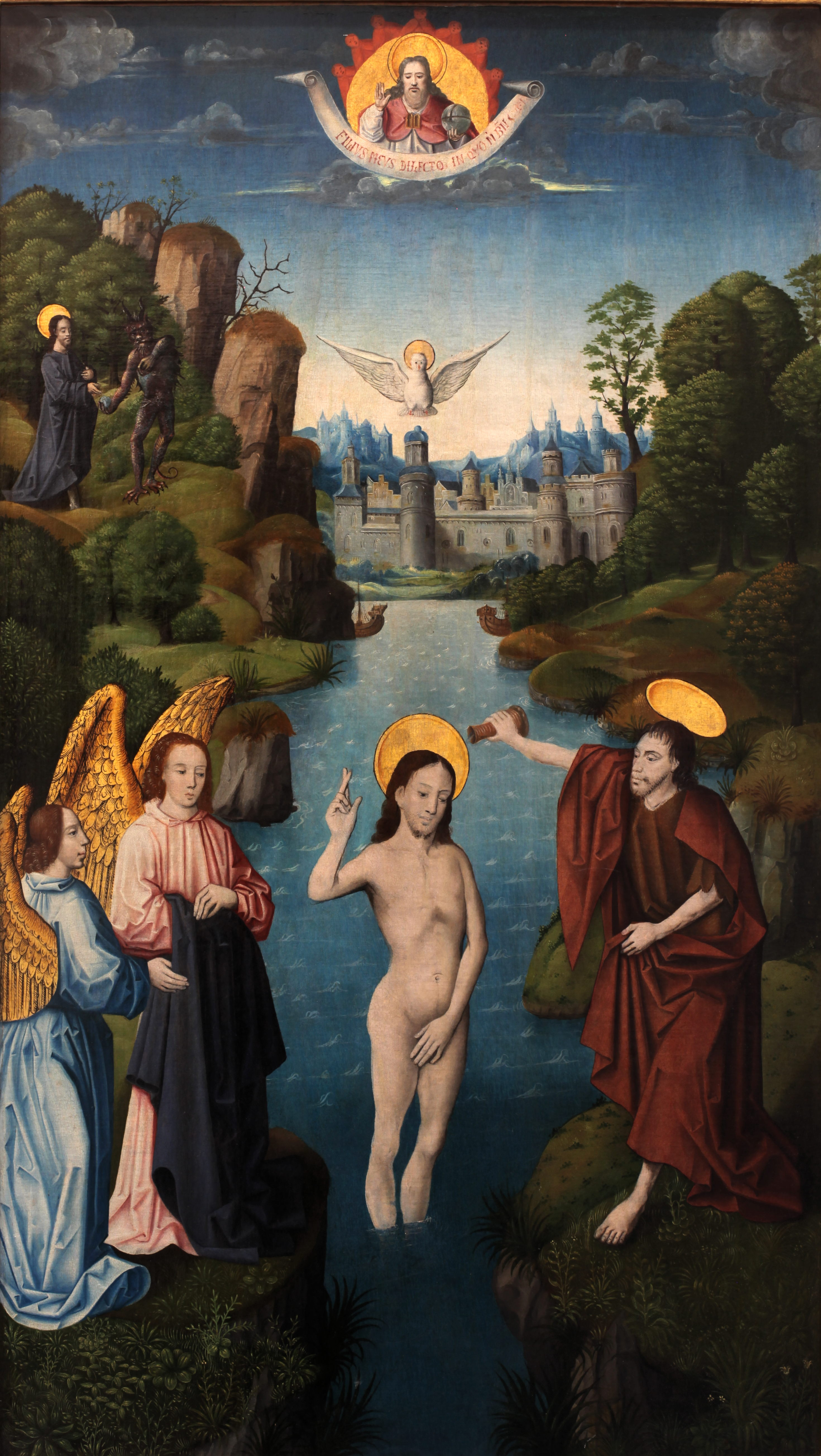
in the Museum of Fine Arts of Lyon

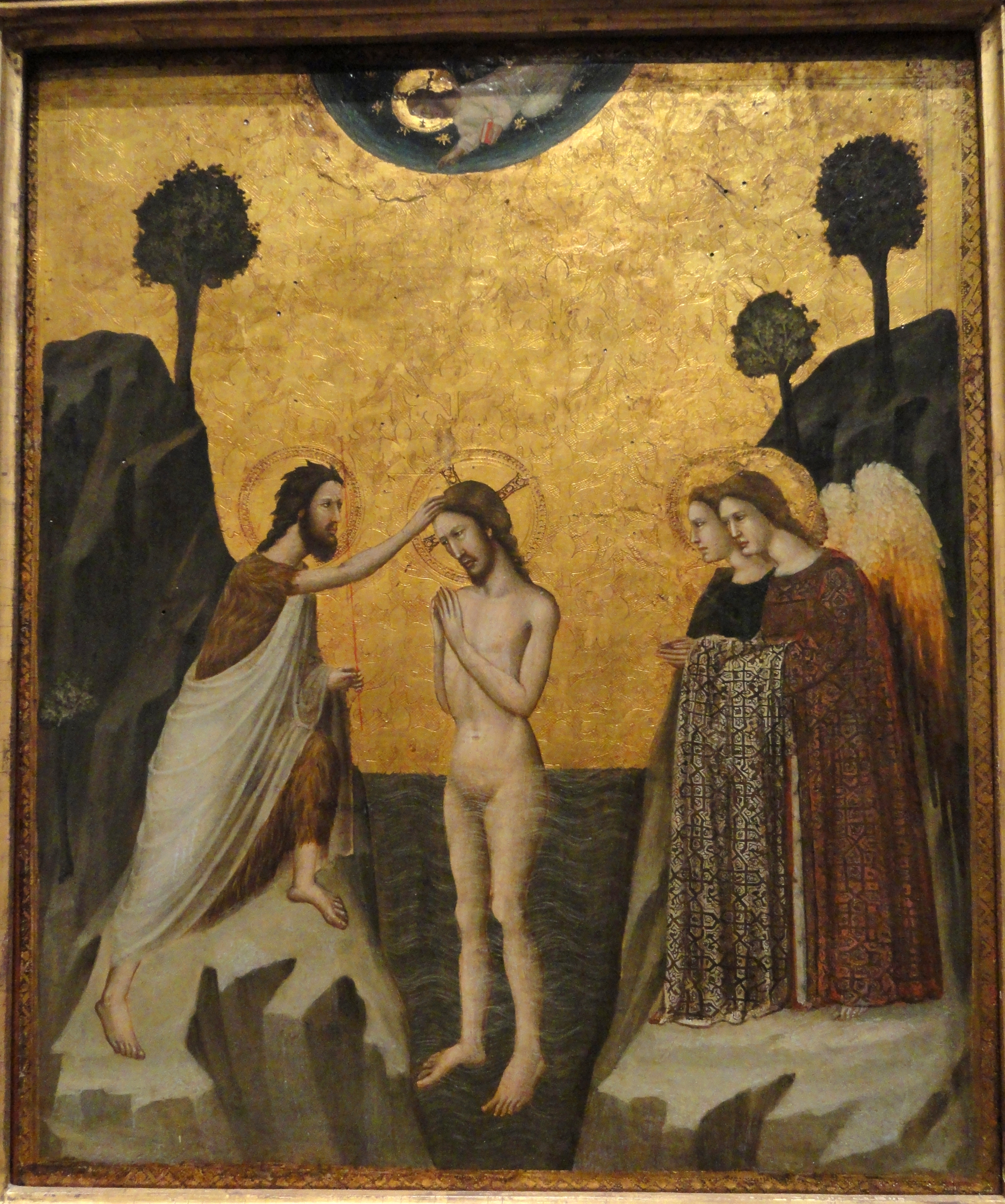
in the National Gallery of Art, Washington, DC

==== Crucifixion ====
Jesus was crucified after being stripped of his clothes by the executioners.

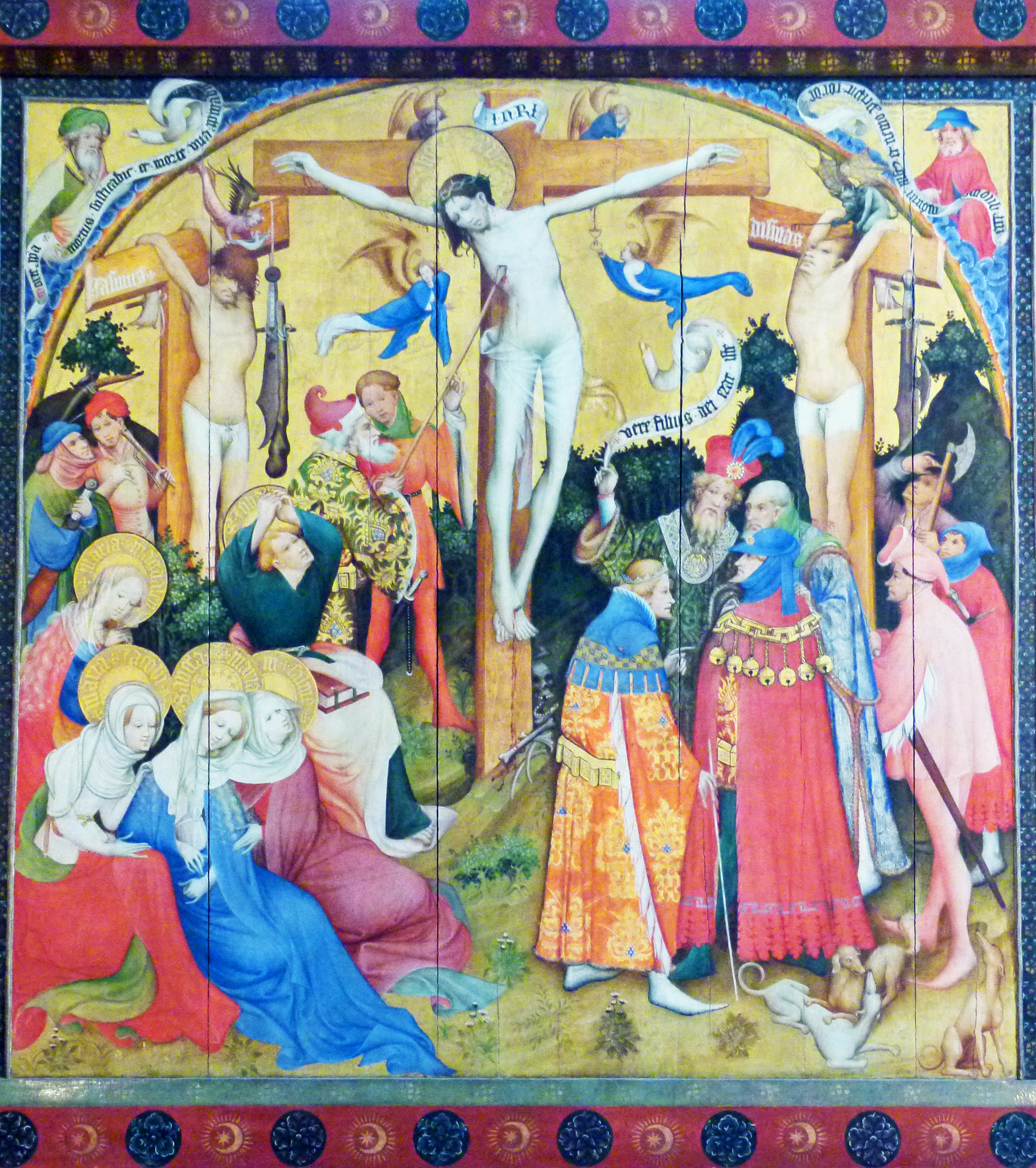
by Konrad von Soest

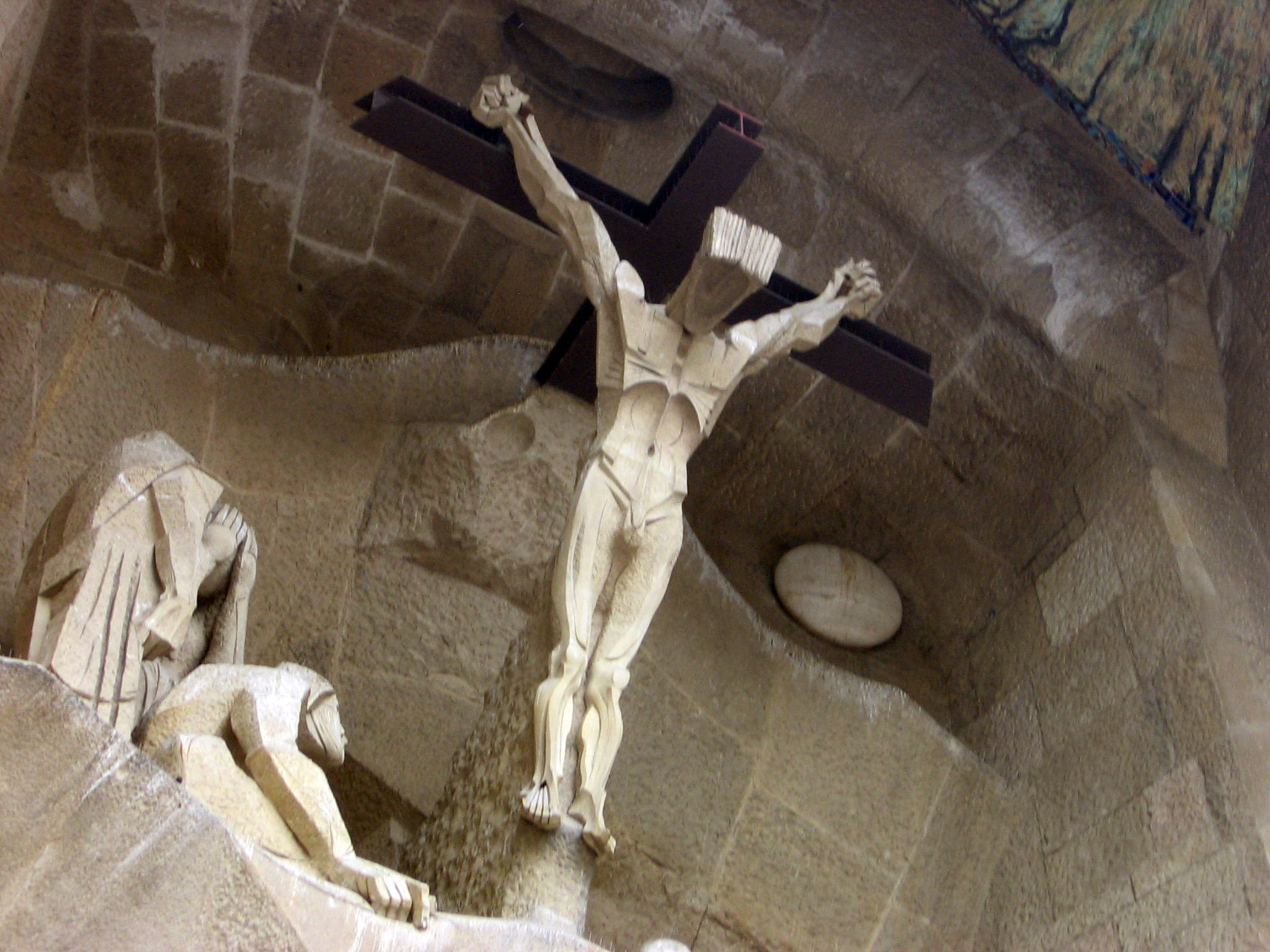
at the Sagrada Família

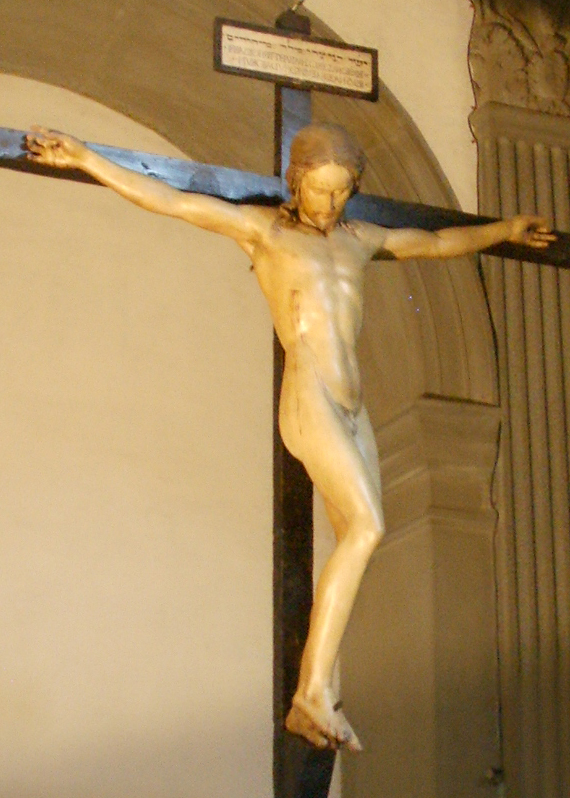
The Crucifix by Michelangelo at the Santo Spirito, Florence

==== Resurrection ====
In the Synoptic Gospels, the women who came to the tomb to anoint Jesus' body found only an angel or a youth or two men; all were wearing white or dazzling garments. In the Gospel of John, it is stated that Jesus' grave clothes were left in the tomb; there are also two angels in white, in contrast to the Synoptic Gospels Jesus is also present; however, no mention is made of Jesus wearing dazzling white robes, (Note: See the Transfiguration of Jesus) and Mary Magdalene mistakes Jesus for the gardener. (Note: It is believed that outdoor work, like gardening, farm labour and fishing in biblical times was often done naked.) Knights 1999, p. 178 and Neal 2012 find it likely that after his resurrection, Jesus emerged from the tomb naked.

== Naturist Christian worship ==
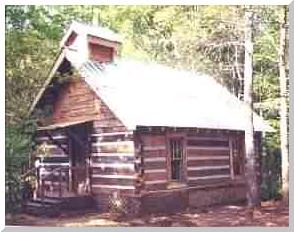
Chapel at former Cherokee Lodge

In the U.S., a few naturist resorts have chapels (permanent or makeshift) on their grounds for the purpose of providing worship services:

- Cedar Waters Village, Nottingham, New Hampshire (only open in summer months);
- Come As You Are Fellowship, De Anza Springs Resort, Jacumba, California;
- Garden Of Eden Church, Lake Como Resort, Lutz, Florida;
- Glen Eden Nudist Resort, Corona, California (Easter only);
- Oaklake Trails, Depew, Oklahoma (only open in summer months);
- Rock Haven Lodge, Murfreesboro, Tennessee (open from mid-March to early October); and
- White Tail Resort, Ivor, Virginia.

In the naturist village of Heliopolis on the Île du Levant, France, there is a chapel for Christian worship, but the Roman Catholic services are not in the nude.

== Naturist Christian camping ==
While not actually a position of the Religious Society of Friends (or Quakers), naturism was the accepted norm for a time in one of their camps for children and teens. The camps started in 1939 and sometime in the 1950s naturism among the coed campers was the norm for such activities as swimming, sauna and other appropriate activities. This practice was abandoned in the mid-2000s due to concerns about maintaining a safe and comfortable environment for the campers.

The founder of the Quaker camps (Farm and Wilderness Camps in Vermont) wrote in his book entitled As Sparks Fly Upward:

A study of comparative cultures leads to the suspicion that it could be, that our culture is wrong in this regard; that the evil that has falsely imputed to nudism is in fact an evil in our own minds. It has cut us off from a health-given, wholesome and joyous practice in which children thrive and adults may find an honesty and straight forwardness, and even a spiritual surety and strength that we grievously lack at present. This "piece of work" that is man, how are we to become convinced of its wonder if by the fetish of hiding the body we deny and destroy some of the health and most of its godlike beauty?

— Webb 1973

== Criticism ==
By far, the most frequent biblical argument against Christian naturism is that if God approved of people being nude, he would not have clothed Adam and Eve after they sinned, thus making it a reminder to man that we had, in fact, sinned. The counter-argument is Adam and Eve had already clothed themselves upon sinning, and God merely replaced the fig leaves with animal skins in granting them free will.

Due to cultural tendencies to equate nudity with sex, many Christian denominations and groups are not supportive of naturism and nudism. Such groups may feel that the temptation of lust is too difficult. Christian naturists counter that the notion of Christians being unable to avoid lust where non-sexualized nudity is present has no scriptural basis whatsoever. Furthermore, they believe Christ has given mankind the power to avoid sin.

Christian naturists have been criticized for being nude around non-Christians (in the sense that some contact between Christians and non-believers takes place), given that they might have no inhibitions against lust and other carnal sin.

In 1 Timothy 2:9, the author urged the women in the Christian church to dress modestly, with "decency and propriety". Critics contend it is in contrast to the beliefs of Christian naturism that the apostle urges them to dress at all. Christian naturists counter that the author was disallowing outlandish and/or expensive clothing (which is prohibited in Christian naturism as well), and not referring to those who choose not to dress.

Other criticism, while it may not oppose naturism per se, is concerned that it will hinder witnessing, divide spouses, promote secrecy to prevent embarrassment, excommunication, etc. As a result, some Christian naturists are isolated from other Christians and their churches. In their effort to find fellowship, many have formed local fellowships, while others are still accepted by their own church groups even though they are known as naturists.

In May 2002, a pastor in southern California was terminated due to his Christian naturist beliefs. The church was affiliated with the Grace Gospel Fellowship and Grace Bible College.

== See also ==
- Nudity in religion
- Christian clothing
- Christian libertarianism
- Issues in social nudity
