= Henry Huntington =

Henry Huntington may refer to:

- Henry E. Huntington (1850–1927), American railroad magnate and art collector
- Henry S. Huntington, American Presbyterian minister and advocate of nudism
- Henry Huntington (politician), member of the 28th New York State Legislature

== See also ==
- Henry Huntingdon (disambiguation)
