= List of United States Supreme Court cases, volume 355 =

This is a list of all the United States Supreme Court cases from volume 355 of the United States Reports:

Case name	Citation	Date decided
Scales v. United States	355 U.S. 1	1957
Lightfoot v. United States	355 U.S. 2	1957
Virginia v. Maryland (355 US 3)	355 U.S. 3	1957
Arkansas Pub. Serv. Comm'n v. United States	355 U.S. 4	1957
Krasnov v. United States	355 U.S. 5	1957
Akron C. & Y.R.R. Co. v. Frozen Food Express	355 U.S. 6	1957
Simpson v. United States	355 U.S. 7	1957
McCrary v. Aladdin Radio Industries, Inc.	355 U.S. 8	1957
FTC v. Crafts	355 U.S. 9	1957
Nationwide Trailer Rental System, Inc. v. United States	355 U.S. 10	1957
White v. Washington	355 U.S. 10	1957
Monson Dray Line, Inc. v. Murphy Motor Freight Lines, Inc.	355 U.S. 11	1957
Willits v. Pennsylvania Pub. Utilities Comm'n	355 U.S. 11	1957
Lincoln Bldg. Associates v. Barr	355 U.S. 12	1957
Cottrell v. Pawcatuck Co.	355 U.S. 12	1957
Gibraltar Factors Corp. v. Slapo	355 U.S. 13	1957
ICC v. Premier Peat Moss Corp.	355 U.S. 13	1957
Four Maple Drive Realty Corp. v. Abrams	355 U.S. 14	1957
Watson v. United States (1957)	355 U.S. 14	1957
Albanese v. Pierce	355 U.S. 15	1957
United States v. Vorreiter	355 U.S. 15	1957
Uphaus v. Wyman	355 U.S. 16	1957
Lewis v. Florida	355 U.S. 16	1957
McGee v. United States	355 U.S. 17	1957
Gutierrez v. Arizona	355 U.S. 17	1957
Gibson v. Thompson	355 U.S. 18	1957
Palermo v. Luckenbach S.S. Co.	355 U.S. 20	1957
Hobart v. Hobart	355 U.S. 21	1957
New Orleans Ins. Exch. v. United States	355 U.S. 22	1957
Hurt v. Oklahoma	355 U.S. 22	1957
Association of Lithuanian Workers v. Brownell	355 U.S. 23	1957
Black v. Magnolia Liquor Co.	355 U.S. 24	1957
Alcorta v. Texas	355 U.S. 28	1957
Banta v. United States	355 U.S. 33	1957
Banta v. United States	355 U.S. 34	1957
Times Film Corp. v. City of Chicago	355 U.S. 35	1957
Edwards v. United States	355 U.S. 36	1957
Corsa v. Tawes	355 U.S. 37	1957
Ford v. United States	355 U.S. 38	1957
Machinists v. L.P. Cavett Co.	355 U.S. 39	1957
Wometco Tel. & Theatre Co. v. United States	355 U.S. 40	1957
Swift v. Bethel	355 U.S. 40	1957
Conley v. Gibson	355 U.S. 41	1957
Williams v. Simons	355 U.S. 49	1957
In re Lamkin	355 U.S. 59	1957
Poret v. Sigler	355 U.S. 60	1957
Lee You Fee v. Dulles	355 U.S. 61	1957
Stinson v. Atlantic Coast Line R.R. Co.	355 U.S. 62	1957
Nashville v. United States	355 U.S. 63	1957
American Public Power Ass'n v. Power Authority	355 U.S. 64	1957
Turner v. Wright	355 U.S. 65	1957
Yates v. United States (Contempt Case)	355 U.S. 66	1957
Rosenbloom v. United States	355 U.S. 80	1957
In re Latimer	355 U.S. 82	1957
Schaffer Trans. Co. v. United States	355 U.S. 83	1957
Benanti v. United States	355 U.S. 96	1957
Rathbun v. United States	355 U.S. 107	1957
Rowoldt v. Perfetto	355 U.S. 115	1957
Youngdahl v. Rainfair, Inc.	355 U.S. 131	1957
American Trucking Ass'ns, Inc. v. United States	355 U.S. 141	1957
Moore v. Michigan	355 U.S. 155	1957
United States ex rel. Lee Kum Hoy v. Murff	355 U.S. 169	1957
Barr v. Mateo	355 U.S. 171	1957
ICC v. Baltimore & O.R.R. Co.	355 U.S. 175	1957
Atchison, T. & S.F.R.R. Co. v. Dixie Carriers, Inc.	355 U.S. 179	1957
Mounce v. United States	355 U.S. 180	1957
World Ins. Co. v. Bethea	355 U.S. 181	1957
Seatrain Lines, Inc. v. United States	355 U.S. 181	1957
Cano v. Pennsylvania	355 U.S. 182	1957
Keco Industries, Inc. v. Cincinnati & Suburban Bell Tel. Co.	355 U.S. 182	1957
In re Reteneller	355 U.S. 183	1957
Walsh v. First Nat'l Bank & Tr. Co.	355 U.S. 183	1957
Green v. United States	355 U.S. 184	1957
McGee v. International Life Ins. Co.	355 U.S. 220	1957
Lambert v. California	355 U.S. 225	1957
United States v. Shotwell Mfg. Co.	355 U.S. 233	1957
United States v. New York, N.H. & H.R. Co.	355 U.S. 253	1957
Virginia v. Maryland (355 US 269)	355 U.S. 269	1957
Railway Express Agency, Inc. v. United States	355 U.S. 270	1957
Carson v. City of Washington Court House	355 U.S. 270	1957
Nelson v. Tennessee	355 U.S. 271	1957
Macdonald v. La Salle Nat'l Bank	355 U.S. 271	1957
Rosengard v. City of Boston	355 U.S. 272	1957
Heikkinen v. United States	355 U.S. 273	1958
Bartkus v. Illinois	355 U.S. 281	1958
Ladner v. United States	355 U.S. 282	1958
Southern R.R. Co. v. United States	355 U.S. 283	1958
N.H. Lyons & Co. v. Lubin	355 U.S. 284	1958
Grossman v. United States	355 U.S. 285	1958
Trotter v. Hall	355 U.S. 285	1958
United States v. Sharpnack	355 U.S. 286	1958
Chicago M.S.P. & P.R.R. Co. v. Illinois	355 U.S. 300	1958
Staub v. City of Baxley	355 U.S. 313	1958
Lawn v. United States	355 U.S. 339	1958
Reeves v. Alabama	355 U.S. 368	1958
Gordon v. Texas	355 U.S. 369	1958
Southern R. Co. v. United States (1958)	355 U.S. 370	1958
One, Inc. v. Olesen	355 U.S. 371	1958
Sunshine Book Co. v. Summerfield	355 U.S. 372	1958
Nashville Milk Co. v. Carnation Co.	355 U.S. 373	1958
Safeway Stores, Inc. v. Vance	355 U.S. 389	1958
Cities Service Gas Co. v. State Corp. Comm'n	355 U.S. 391	1958
Zavada v. United States	355 U.S. 392	1958
Karadzole v. Artukovic	355 U.S. 393	1958
Strauss v. SUNY	355 U.S. 394	1958
Taylor v. Kentucky	355 U.S. 394	1958
Emray Realty Corp. v. Weaver	355 U.S. 395	1958
FTC v. Standard Oil Co.	355 U.S. 396	1958
Moog Industries, Inc. v. FTC	355 U.S. 411	1958
Alleghany Corp. v. Breswick & Co.	355 U.S. 415	1958
Honeycutt v. Wabash R.R. Co.	355 U.S. 424	1958
Michigan Wis. Pipe Line Co. v. Corporation Comm'ns	355 U.S. 425	1958
Kernan v. American Dredging Co.	355 U.S. 426	1958
NLRB v. Mine Workers	355 U.S. 453	1958
American Airlines, Inc. v. North American Airlines, Inc.	355 U.S. 465	1958
United States v. City of Detroit	355 U.S. 466	1958
United States v. City of Muskegon	355 U.S. 484	1958
City of Detroit v. Murray Corp.	355 U.S. 489	1958
Public Utilities Comm'n v. United States	355 U.S. 534	1958
Andrew G. Nelson, Inc. v. United States	355 U.S. 554	1958
Weyerhaeuser S.S. Co. v. Nacirema Operating Co.	355 U.S. 563	1958
United States v. Hvass	355 U.S. 570	1958
Harmon v. Brucker	355 U.S. 579	1958
United States v. R.F. Ball Construction Co.	355 U.S. 587	1958
United States v. Massei	355 U.S. 595	1958
Wilson v. Loew's Inc.	355 U.S. 597	1958
Black v. Amen	355 U.S. 600	1958
Spevack v. Strauss	355 U.S. 601	1958
Sears v. United States	355 U.S. 602	1958
Texas ex rel. Pan Am. Production Co. v. City of Texas City	355 U.S. 603	1958
Oosterhoudt v. Morgan	355 U.S. 603	1958
Roel v. New York Cnty. Lawyers Ass'n	355 U.S. 604	1958
Barnes v. NBC	355 U.S. 604	1958
Mills Mill v. Hawkins	355 U.S. 605	1958
Klig v. Rogers	355 U.S. 605	1958
Thillens, Inc. v. Morey	355 U.S. 606	1958
Rowland v. Texas	355 U.S. 606	1958
Bendix Aviation Corp. v. Indiana Dept. of Revenue	355 U.S. 607	1958
Carlson v. Washington	355 U.S. 607	1958
Barnes v. CBS	355 U.S. 608	1958
Gostovich v. Valore	355 U.S. 608	1958
