= Henry Huntingdon =

Henry Huntingdon may refer to:

- Henry of Huntingdon, Anglo-Norman historian
- Henry Huntingdon (1885–1907) of the Huntingdon Baronets
- Henry Hastings, 5th Earl of Huntingdon (1586 – 1643), prominent English nobleman and literary patron
- Henry Hastings, 3rd Earl of Huntingdon

== See also ==
- Henry E. Huntington, American businessman
- Henry S. Huntington, American Presbyterian minister and nudism advocate
