= Besser Manufacturing Co. v. United States =

- Supreme Court of the United States

Argued April 21, 1952 Decided May 26, 1952
- Full case name: Besser Manufacturing Company v. United States
- Citations: 343 U.S. 444 (more) 72 S. Ct. 838; 96 L. Ed. 2d 1063; 1952 U.S. LEXIS 2810; 93 U.S.P.Q. 321

Case history
- Prior: 96 F. Supp. 304 (E.D. Mich. 1951)

Court membership
- Chief Justice Fred M. Vinson Associate Justices Hugo Black · Stanley F. Reed; Felix Frankfurter · William O. Douglas; Robert H. Jackson · Harold H. Burton; Tom C. Clark · Sherman Minton

Case opinion
- Majority: Jackson, joined by a unanimous court
- Clark took no part in the consideration or decision of the case.

Besser Manufacturing Co. v. United States, 343 U.S. 444 (1951), is a 1951 patent–antitrust decision of the United States Supreme Court in which the Court upheld a ruling that the dominant U.S. manufacturer of concrete block–making machines violated the antitrust laws when it acquired its two principal competitors (attaining a 65% market share), bought important patents, made bad–faith threats of patent infringement suits, and entered into patent licensing agreements in which the parties were given veto powers over any prospective additional licensees. The Supreme Court approved the district court's grant of compulsory, reasonable–royalty licensing of the patents and compulsory sales of patented machines, holding that such relief "is a well–recognized remedy where patent abuses are proved in antitrust actions, and it is required for effective relief."

== Background ==
Besser Manufacturing Company held a dominant position in manufacturing concrete block–making machines. It acquired several patents for automatically making concrete block. In 1948 it succeeded in acquiring control of its principal competitor, Stearns Manufacturing Company, and the two firms accounted for 65% of dollar sales volume in 1948; the other 35% was divided among 53 companies, two of which had 14% together and the rest had the remaining 21%. In 1946, Besser had acquired Stephen Flam, Inc., another major competitor, and Flam's patents.

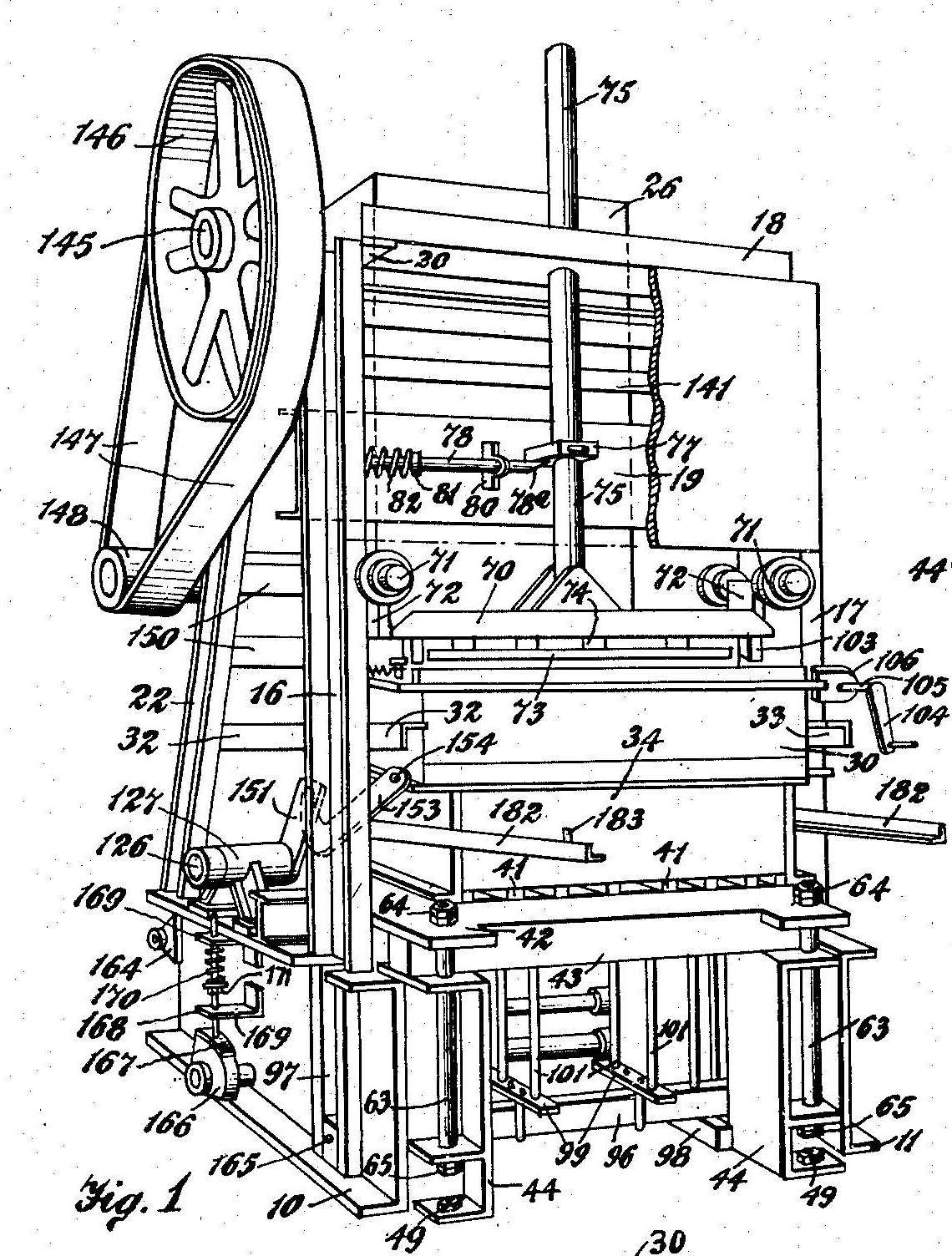
Besser's patented concrete block making machine

In 1942, in settlement of patent infringement litigation with inventors Gelbman and Andrus, Besser and Stearns entered into an agreement under which Stearns and Besser were each given the right to use the Gelbman and Andrus patents, but exclusively to them, and it was agreed that they were to have the benefit of, and right to use, any and all future improvements and patents covering concrete block making machines that Gelbman and Andrus might conceive. Not only were Gelbman and Andrus prohibited from licensing anyone else, but Besser and Stearns were each prohibited from licensing anyone else without the consent of the others. Besser continued to buy patents from others, and threatened patent infringement suit without even having seen the accused machines.

The government sued Besser, Stearns, Gelbman, and Andrus in the Eastern District of Michigan for conspiring to restrain and monopolize trade in the manufacture of concrete block making machines, and for monopolizing such trade.

== Ruling by district court ==
The district court found that the contract of Gelbman and Andrus "goes further than is necessary to protect the patent monopoly of Gelbman and Andrus." An exclusive license to one company would be permissible, but:

[H]ere the patentees have joined hands with the two largest competitors in the industry and by terms of their agreement have virtually made it impossible for others to obtain rights under those patents. The contract even gives Stearns and Besser the power to restrict competition present and future by requiring their joint consent before licensing others. It is this combination requiring collective action that primarily invalidates the agreement. We believe it clear that the parties intended this contract to be a means whereby control of the industry could be acquired and competition eliminated. For what other reason would Besser or Stearns want the consent of the other before approving a licensee suggested by the patentees? And where it is apparent, as it is here, that the contract is to eliminate competition, it must be held illegal.

Furthermore, documents were before the court that "denote Besser's objective to accomplish the elimination of almost every competitor" in the industry by such conduct as:

(1) recklessly made bad–faith threats of suit,
(2) purchase of competitors' assets, and
(3) covenants not to compete.

The court therefore concluded "that the defendants, Besser, Stearns, Andrus and Gelbman have combined and conspired to restrain and to monopolize interstate trade and commerce in concrete block machines in violation of Sections 1 and 2 of the Sherman Act, and that Besser Manufacturing Co. and Jesse H. Besser have attempted to monopolize and have monopolized said trade and commerce in violation of Section 2 of the Act." The court accordingly ordered that:

(1) the Besser interests must dispose of their holdings in the Stearns company;
(2) the Gelbman-Andrus patents, plus all improvements and inventions made subsequently, must be made subject to reasonable royalty, nondiscriminatory licensing to the industry;
(3) leased machines must be sold to the lessees unless they prefer to continue leasing them; and
(4) the defendants are prohibited from entering into similar agreements in the future.

== Ruling by Supreme Court ==
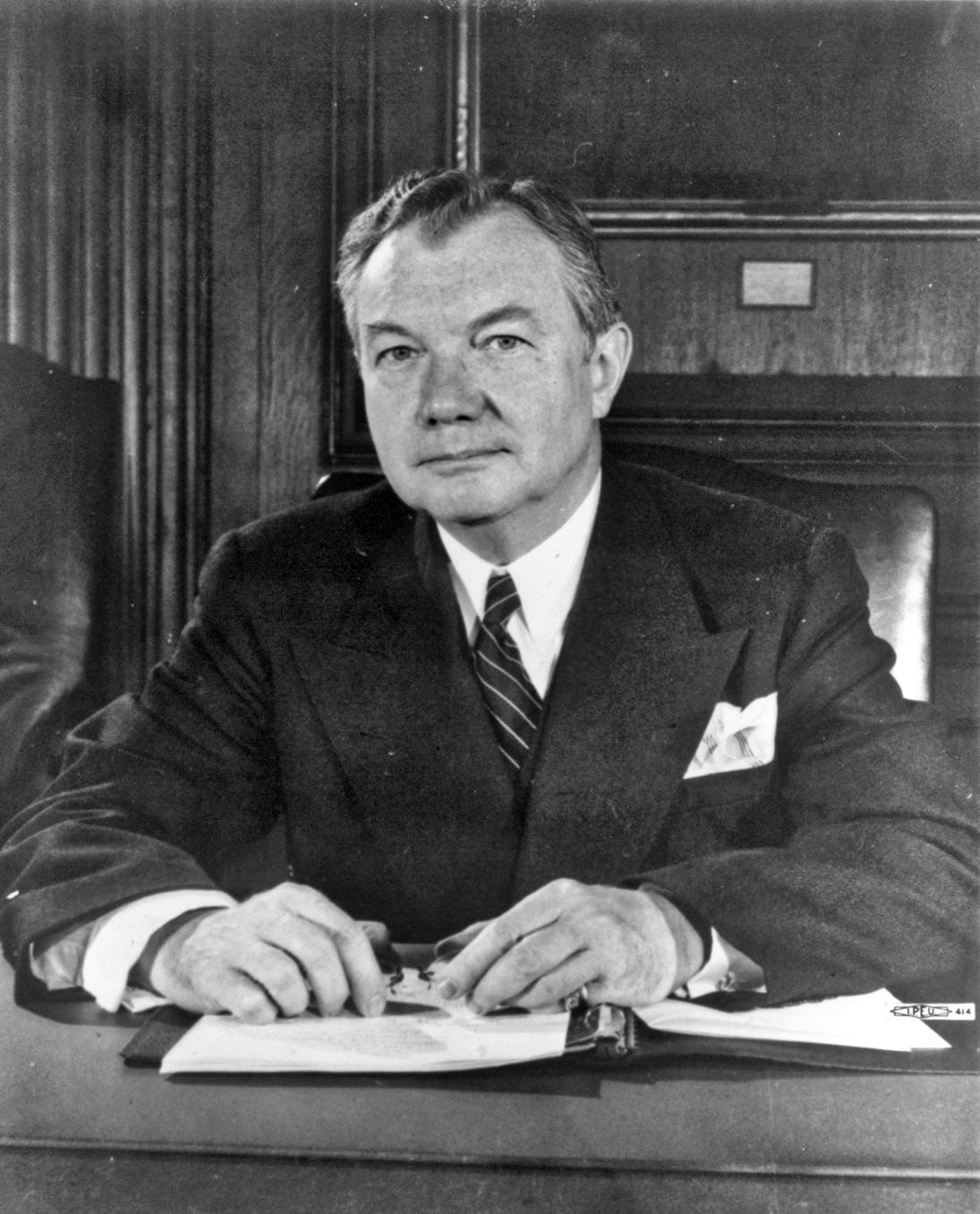
Justice Jackson delivered the unanimous opinion of the Supreme Court, affirming the district court's judgment

Justice Robert H. Jackson delivered the unanimous opinion of the Supreme Court, affirming the judgment below.

Only the Besser Company and its president, Jesse H. Besser, appealed. The Court began by stating "that the conclusions of the trial judge that appellants conspired to restrain and monopolize interstate commerce in concrete block-making machinery and that they monopolized and attempted to monopolize that industry are overwhelmingly supported." The Court therefore rejected Besser's argument that the evidence did not show the antitrust violation that the district court has found.

Besser opposed the reasonable royalty, compulsory licensing order as "punitive, confiscatory and inappropriate." The Court responded that "compulsory patent licensing is a well recognized remedy where patent abuses are proved in antitrust actions, and it is required for effective relief."

The Court therefore affirmed the judgment of the district court.

== Subsequent developments ==
The doctrine of the Besser case against veto–power clauses in patent licenses was followed in United States v. Krasnov. The facts of the Krasnov case were not completely identical to those of the Besser case, but the court said, "I think the evil which the court there struck down exists here, namely, (1) the veto power over licensing rights granted to a licensee and (2) the contractual arrangement which created the power to restrict competition by requiring joint consent before others could be licensed."
