= United States v. Krasnov =

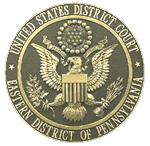
- Court: United States District Court for the Eastern District of Pennsylvania
- Full case name: United States of America v. Joseph A. Krasnov, Samuel Krasnov, Seymour Krasnov, The Comfy Manufacturing Company, Fred E. Katzner and Arthur Oppenheimer, Jr.
- Decided: July 30, 1956
- Citations: 143 F. Supp. 184; 110 U.S.P.Q. 411

Case history
- Appealed to: Supreme Court of the United States
- Subsequent actions: Affirmed per curiam without opinion, Krasnov v. United States, 355 U.S. 5 (1957).

Court membership
- Judge sitting: Thomas James Clary

United States v. Krasnov, 143 F. Supp. 184 (E.D. Pa. 1956), was a 1956 district court patent–antitrust decision that the United States Supreme Court affirmed per curiam without opinion. The district court granted the Government's summary judgment motion because it concluded:

That the defendants in combination controlled the market and had the ability to and did drive competitors from the business of manufacturing knitted fabric slip covers is abundantly clear from the record. That the defendants in combination fixed and maintained prices is likewise crystal clear. That the defendants in combination and cross-licensing created a situation in the industry which, particularly by agreement for joint action respecting the patents, effectively hindered newcomers in the field, is also established beyond peradventure of doubt. That the harassing suits against competitors, previously discussed in some detail, were designed as and were actually only harassing suits is clear from an examination of the correspondence between the parties and the Court feels that such conclusion in inescapable from an objective analysis of the documents. All of these actions taken in concert constitute a clear violation of the Sherman Anti-Trust Act and the Government has established to the satisfaction of the Court that the combination and conspiracy above referred to represents an unreasonable restraint of trade and commerce among the several states of the United States in the manufacture and sale of ready-made furniture slip covers, is unlawful, and in violation of Section 1 of the Sherman Anti-Trust Act. Further, the Government, in the opinion of the Court, has effectively demonstrated that the defendants combined and conspired not only to restrain trade unreasonably but also to monopolize trade and commerce among the several states of the United States in the manufacture and sale of ready-made furniture slip covers, in direct violation of Section 2 of the Sherman Anti-Trust Act. The Court also feels that by documentary proof the Government has established that the defendants have used patent rights unlawfully in instituting, effectuating and maintaining the aforesaid combination and conspiracy which likewise constitutes a clear violation of the Sherman Anti-Trust Act.

== Background ==
The Government brought a civil antitrust action against the defendants for combining and conspiring to restrain and monopolize trade and commerce in the manufacture and sale of ready-made furniture slip covers, and for attempting to monopolize and monopolizing such trade. The defendants were Joseph A. Krasnov, Samuel Krasnov and Seymour Krasnov, partners in the business of manufacturing and selling ready-made furniture slip covers, doing business under the trade name of Sure-Fit Products Co.; Comfy Manufacturing Company, another manufacturer and seller of ready-made slip covers; Fred E. Katzner, President and CEO of Comfy; and Arthur Oppenheimer, an inventor and patentee of a patent involved in the case. Sure-Fit and Comfy were the two largest manufacturers of slip covers in the United States; in 1949 they manufactured approximately 62% of all slip covers manufactured in the United States; and 13 other manufacturers accounted for the remaining 38% of sales, the largest other competitor accounting for only 9% of the total. In 1949, total U.S. sales of ready-made furniture slip covers were more than $23 million.

Oppenheimer patented slipcover

In 1938, Oppenheimer transferred title in his U.S. Patent No. 2,199,868 to Comfy, but retained a reversionary interest in it as well as rights to royalties on patented slip covers and 25% of any patent infringement damages. Comfy began to enforce the Oppenheimer patent by suing retailers only and demanding, as the condition for settlement, discontinuance of the sale of competitors' goods and adoption of the Comfy line. In 1938 Comfy sued and settled with Hecht's of New York, a Sure-Fit customer; Hecht agreed to Comfy's terms and Comfy dismissed the suit. When Sure-Fit found its customers receiving notices of infringement and being threatened with suit, it sought an opinion from its attorney, who informed it "that there was no possibility of the Oppenheimer patent being sustained in an adequately contested suit." In 1928 Sure-Fit filed a suit against Comfy, in the Southern District of New York, seeking to have the Oppenheimer patent declared invalid and charging Comfy with unfair competition and violation of the antitrust laws. In October 1938, Comfy and Sure-Fit, with Oppenheimer's approval, entered into an agreement, the basic document of the alleged conspiracy; Sure-Fit then dismissed its suit against Comfy, by stipulation of counsel.

In 1939, Comfy and Sure-Fit entered into an agreement, with the knowledge and consent of Oppenheimer (who signed the agreement), under which:

(a) Comfy would license Sure-Fit to manufacture and sell slip covers under the Oppenheimer patent, and Sure-Fit would cross license Comfy to manufacture and sell, to a limited number of customers, slip covers embodying the invention claimed in a patent owned by Sure-Fit;
(b) Comfy would not grant licenses to others under the Oppenheimer patent without Sure-Fit's consent;
(c) Comfy was to set the price to be maintained for slip covers manufactured under the Oppenheimer patent, and
(d) the defendants would share the expenses resulting from litigation brought against alleged infringers of the Oppenheimer patent.

While Comfy and Sure-Fit made peace with each other, they sent letters to individual retailers selling competitors' merchandise, threatening them with suit unless they discontinued the sale of such merchandise. They brought suits only for the purpose of having the retailer discontinue a competitor's line and adopt theirs. Then they discontinued the suits after getting a letter agreement not to handle competitors' products. If the retailer handled competitive merchandise again, the defendants sued on the letter agreements for breach of contract rather than for patent infringement, since they wanted to avoid testing the patent's validity.

== District court proceedings ==
The Government sued the defendants— Joseph A. Krasnov, Samuel Krasnov, Seymour Krasnov, Sure-Fit Products Co.; Comfy Manufacturing Company, and Fred E. Katzner, President and CEO of Comfy; and Arthur Oppenheimer,

The defendants sought to defend the price-fixing charge on the basis of United States v. General Electric Co. The court found the facts of the case quite different from those of the General Electric case, and rejected the argument:

The price arrangement was not executed in a manner so that its purpose can be said to have been the protection of the patentee's monopoly with, of course, the necessary incidental benefits accruing to the licensee; but rather it was used as a two-edged implement to cut equally for the benefit of both the licensor and licensee. Comfy complained to Sure-Fit when one of the latter's customers failed to maintain the retail price and Sure-Fit sent out a salesman to adjust the matter; Sure-Fit in like manner and with apparent equal right watched Comfy's customers. It complained about Gimbels, Strawbridge and Clothier, and Goldblatt's. Comfy replied to the complaints and assured Sure-Fit that it would take steps to adjust these matters, and thereafter Comfy kept Sure-Fit advised of its progress along these lines. They each had an interest in maintaining a set retail price and they each took action towards that end. The agreement operated equally for the benefit of the patentee and the licensee and does not fall within the rule of the 1General Electric case, as such. There is no question that the agreement potentially tended to eliminate competition and was an unreasonable restraint on trade within the meaning of the Sherman Anti-Trust Act.

The district court turned to the joint-agreement provisions governing licensing, which the court considered similar to that in Besser Mfg. Co. v. United States Although the present facts were not completely identical, the court said, " I think the evil which the court there struck down exists here, namely, (1) the veto power over licensing rights granted to a licensee and (2) the contractual arrangement which created the power to restrict competition by requiring joint consent before others could be licensed." The pattern was the same, in that "no one, the patentee, the assignee, or the licensee, can create any rights under the patent in any other person without the consent of the other two. The owner of the patent and the two dominant manufacturers in the trade have so bound themselves."

Given the predominantly documentary evidence of the defendants' conspiracy to restrain and monopolize trade in the industry, the court said, "it would be futile for the defendants at this late date to attempt to explain away the contents of documents which so clearly express the actual business transactions of the respective defendants," and entered summary judgment against the defendants.

== Ruling of Supreme Court ==
The defendants appealed to the Supreme Court, which summarily affirmed per curiam.

== Commentary ==
● A 1983 Note in the Yale Law Journal asserted that "a refusal to license that results from collusion among competitors clearly violates the antitrust laws," citing Krasnov.

● Economics professor Richard Gilbert envisions the possibility that a coordination of enforcement and veto power in licensing among or between patentees might support the conclusion that "the benefits from coordination could outweigh the risks to competition." He compares the Krasnov case with Mason City Tent & Awning Co. v. Clapper. In Mason City a district court held unlawful an agreement between two patentees that provided for a joint defense fund and gave each of the patentees veto power over the other's grant of licenses. The patents appeared to be complementary patents, covering cab enclosure devices for tractors. Before the patents were issued, there were extensive discussions between the parties concerning the royalties they would charge, the licensing terms, and which firms they would license. The court concluded that the high degree of coordination between the patentees and in particular the joint defense fund and the veto power over licenses were an unlawful extension of the patent grant. But Gilbert disagreed, because of the complementarity he saw in the patents. He argued that this factor made the agreements more procompetitive than anticompetitive. He contrasted this fact pattern with that of Krasnov, which he considered "unsurprisingly" deemed illegal.
