= Lambert v. California =

- Supreme Court of the United States

Argued April 3, 1957 Reargued October 16–17, 1957 Decided December 16, 1957
- Full case name: Lambert v. California
- Citations: 355 U.S. 225 (more) 78 S. Ct. 240, 2 L. Ed. 2d 228, 1957 U.S. LEXIS 3
- Argument: Oral argument

Holding
- When applied to a person who has no actual knowledge of his duty to register, and no showing is made of the probability of such knowledge, the ordinance violates the Due Process Clause of the Fourteenth Amendment.

Court membership
- Chief Justice Earl Warren Associate Justices Hugo Black · Felix Frankfurter; William O. Douglas · Harold H. Burton; Tom C. Clark · John M. Harlan II; William J. Brennan Jr. · Charles E. Whittaker

Case opinions
- Majority: Douglas, joined by Warren, Black, Clark, Brennan
- Dissent: Burton
- Dissent: Frankfurter, joined by Harlan, Whittaker

Laws applied
- U.S. Const. Amend. XIV

Lambert v. California, 355 U.S. 225 (1957), was a United States Supreme Court case regarding the defense of ignorance of the law when there is no legal notice. The court held that when one is required to register one's presence, failure to register may be punished only when there is a probability that the accused party had knowledge of the law before committing the crime of failing to register.

== Background ==
Lambert had previously been convicted of forgery, a felony in California. She was unaware that a Los Angeles city ordinance required that she, being a felon, register if she remained in the city for more than five days. The ordinance stipulated that she, as a convicted criminal, could be fined $500 and sentenced to up to six months in jail for every day that she remained in the city after the five-day limit. When she was arrested on suspicion of committing another offense, she was convicted for failure to register. As Lambert was not allowed to use her lack of knowledge as a defense, she was convicted, fined $250, and sentenced to three years probation. Lambert appealed her case, arguing that she had no knowledge that she had to register her name and that convicting her would deprive her of due process under the Fourteenth Amendment.

== Decision ==
The Supreme Court reversed Lambert's conviction by holding that knowledge or probability of knowledge of a statute is required to convict someone of a notice offense. Justice William Douglas, who delivered the majority opinion for the Court, wrote:

Where a person did not know of the duty to register and where there was no proof of the probability of such knowledge, he may not be convicted consistently with due process.

However, the Court did not overturn the right of states and municipalities to force occupants to register for a given purpose. The Court held that because the ordinance that forced convicted felons to register was not accompanied by any action, and there were no circumstances that would lead felons to be aware of their duty to register, the ordinance was unconstitutional. The Justice continued:

Registration laws are common, and their range is wide. Many such laws are akin to licensing statutes in that they pertain to the regulation of business activities. But the present ordinance is entirely different. Violation of its provisions is unaccompanied by any activity whatever, mere presence in the city being the test. Moreover, circumstances which might move one to inquire as to the necessity of registration are completely lacking. At most, the ordinance is but a law enforcement technique designed for the convenience of law enforcement agencies through which a list of the names and addresses of felons then residing in a given community is compiled. The disclosure is merely a compilation of former convictions already publicly recorded in the jurisdiction where obtained. Nevertheless, this appellant, on first becoming aware of her duty to register, was given no opportunity to comply with the law and avoid its penalty, even though her default was entirely innocent. She could but suffer the consequences of the ordinance, namely, conviction with the imposition of heavy criminal penalties thereunder. We believe that actual knowledge of the duty to register or proof of the probability of such knowledge and subsequent failure to comply are necessary before a conviction under the ordinance can stand.

== Significance ==
This case is an exception to the legal principle ignorantia legis non excusat ("the ignorance of the law is not a suitable excuse for breaking it") because this case deals with the absence of "actual knowledge" (Lambert v. California, Page 355 U. S. 229) of a law that came about from a "wholly passive" (Lambert v. California, Page 355 U. S. 228) conduct, whereby there was "no proof of the probability of such knowledge" because the absence of "actual knowledge" of the law came about from a "wholly passive" conduct.

== See also ==
- Indeterminacy debate in legal theory
- List of United States Supreme Court cases, volume 355
- Symbol grounding problem
