= Love and Responsibility =

1960 book by Karol Wojtyła (Pope John Paul II)

- Cover to the English first edition
- Author: Karol Wojtyła
- Original title: Miłość i Odpowiedzialność
- Translator: H. T. Willetts
- Cover artist: Roxanne Mei Lum
- Language: Polish
- Subject: Love and Human Sexuality
- Publisher: William Collins Sons & Co. Ltd., London and Farrar, Straus and Giroux, Inc., New York City
- Publication date: 1960
- Publication place: Poland
- English publication date: 1981
- Media type: Print (Hardback & Paperback) & Audio book
- Pages: 319
- ISBN: 0-89870-445-6
- Dewey Decimal: 241/.66 20
- LC Class: BT708 .J6313 1993

Love and Responsibility is a book written by Karol Wojtyła before he became Pope John Paul II and was originally published in Polish in 1960 and in English in 1981. A new translation was published in 2013. Fr. Wojtyła was inspired to write the book when he was a professor at the Catholic University of Lublin, through the experiences he had while teaching young Catholics.

== Background ==
While at the university, Fr. Wojtyła gathered a group of about 20 young people, who began to call themselves ‘Rodzinka’, the "little family". They met for prayers, philosophical discussions, and helping the blind and sick. The group eventually grew to approximately 200 participants, and their activities expanded to include annual skiing and kayaking trips. The insight he gained from these meetings and discussions helped him develop the raw material for the text.

== Description ==
The work consists of five chapters; "The Person and the Sexual Urge"; "The Person and Love"; "The Person and Chastity"; "Justice to the Creator"; and "Sexology and Ethics". It is described as 'a defence of the traditional Church teachings on marriage from a new philosophical standpoint'. In his introduction to the first edition, Fr. Wojtyla describes his reasons for writing the book as being "born principally of the need to put the norms of Catholic sexual morality on a firm basis, a basis as definitive as possible, relying on the most elementary and incontrovertible moral truths and the most fundamental values or goods".

Father Wojtyła writes that marital sexual intercourse is the best image of God who is love, for he sees the human body as the only one capable of making the invisible — the spiritual and the divine — visible. He says that human beings were created by God for a purpose: to be persons who freely choose to love, to give themselves as persons who express their self-giving through their bodies. Thus, sexual intercourse between husband and wife is a symbol of their total mutual self-donation, and further fosters, strengthens and enriches it not just for the present but also for the future. For Fr. Wojtyła, "The body, and it alone, is capable of making visible what is invisible: the spiritual and divine."

Marriage is an act of will that signifies and involves a mutual gift, which unites the spouses and binds them to their eventual souls, with whom they make up a sole family – a domestic church.

— Karol Wojtyła

== Insights into gender ==
Wojtyła's conception of gender flows from his philosophy of the human person. He posits a theistic humanism grounded in Imago Dei: mankind in the image and likeness of God. A human being is an integrated body and soul, with a complementary union of two genders, male and female.

Wojtyła's philosophy is based on the phenomenological tradition, which deals with the subjective experience of humans and how culture, language, upbringing, and biases all affect the way individuals see the objective world. The ethical system he presents appears heavily centered on actions and deeds. However he argues that there is a metaphysical reality in which human subjects realize themselves and ground themselves in it by acting in freedom. Specifically, the metaphysical realism is God and His creation of man in His own image and likeness. Yet, there is not a divide between man's subjectiveness and his metaphysical reality. Wojtyla refers to one's own subjective experience as "lived experience" or "inner life" and argues that an individual's conscious perception of this interior life is the experience of oneself as an acting self rooted in a metaphysical reality.

This interior life of a person rooted in the metaphysical reality of Imago Dei is what shapes John Paul II's conception of gender. He argues that since God is in a triune relation of love, if man is created in His image then man should also be in a relation of love. The complementarity of the two sexes, then, is rooted in a relationship of love, and the very differences between men and women allow them to exist in this relationship together. Since man is a composite of body and soul, and since the body makes visible the invisible nature of the soul, the very fact that men's and women's bodies physically complement each other is proof of their relationship of love. As men and women are both created in Imago Dei they are both equal in dignity, although they are different. For Wojtyła, those differences are what allows men and women to exist coherently together in a union of love, reflecting man's deepest identity.

== See also ==
- Christian naturism § Vatican

== Sources ==
- Wojtyła, Karol (1993). Love and Responsibility. London: William Collins Sons & Co. Ltd. ISBN 0-89870-445-6. Archived from the original on 11 February 2009.
- Wojtyła, Karol. Love and Responsibility on Google Books. Retrieved 15 October 2009.
- Wojtyła, Karol. Miłość i odpowiedzialność Love and Responsibility e-book in Polish. Retrieved 15 October 2009.
