= Ilsley Boone =

American social nudity advocate, publisher, editor, and theologian

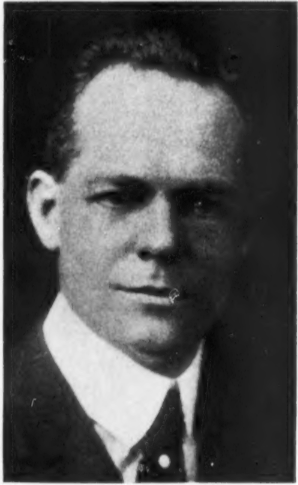
- Born: 5 March 1879; Brooklyn, New York City
- Died: 29 November 1968 (aged 89); Whitehouse, Ohio
- Education: Brown University, Andover Newton Theological School
- Occupation(s): priest, theologian, author, publisher, activist, speaker
- Organization: American Sunbathing Association
- Known for: Founding American Sunbathing Association
- Movement: Nudism
- Children: 3
- Parents: Silas Ilsley Boone; Agnes Ferris Turnbull Eldridge

Ilsley /ˈɛlzliː/ Silias Boone (1879–1968) was a charismatic speaker, a powerful organizer, a magazine publisher and the founding father of the American Sunbathing Association (ASA)—later reorganized as the American Association for Nude Recreation (AANR). As a publisher he distributed the first nudist magazine in the United States. That publication eventually led to a challenge to the U.S. Postal Service's ban against sending obscene materials through the mail. Boone took his challenge all the way to the U.S. Supreme Court which struck down the ban.

== Early life ==
Ilsley was born to Silas Ilsley Boone (1846–1900) and Agnes Ferris Turnbull Eldridge (1849–1940) in Brooklyn, New York in 1879. Little is known of Boone's early life, other than that he lived in Brooklyn with his two brothers and two sisters. In 1904 he graduated from Brown University and married Alice M. Barragar. Together they had two children: a daughter, Agnes Margaret Boone, and a son, Frederick Eldredge Boone. They soon moved to Newton, Massachusetts, where he obtained a divinity degree from Newton Theological Institute. Originally ordained as a Baptist, he served as the pastor of the Baptist church in Ipswich, Massachusetts, serving from October, 1904, to August, 1907. In 1921 Boone became pastor of the Ponds Reformed Church (Dutch Reformed) in Oakland, New Jersey. In the mid-1920s, he developed the concept of visual education under contract with the New York City Public School System. With the onset of the Great Depression, the city canceled Boone's contract, but his interest in education continued, serving with the Oakland Public School system. During this period he divorced his first wife and married his paternal first cousin, Ella Murray "Mae" Boone. (Note: Mae's father was Christopher Columbus Boone (1863–1926), younger brother to Silas.) (Note: Although many U.S. states prohibit first cousin marriage, it is legal in New York and New Jersey. Late in his life Boone moved to Ohio (where first cousin marriage was illegal), but by this time he was a widower, so the issue was moot. Also, the Bible does not forbid cousin marriage in its list of prohibited relatives. (The relevant Bible verses are found in Leviticus and Deuteronomy)) They had three children: Bradford Ilsley Boone, Nancy Adeline Boone, and Berton Maxfield Boone.

== Nudist activism ==
In 1930 Kurt Barthel had formed The American League for Physical Culture (ALPC), America's first nudist organization. The following year Boone became interested in naturism and was appointed as the ALPC Executive Secretary. Soon after, Barthel asked him to take his place as President of the ALPC, the position which Boone held for 20 years until August, 1952. (The organization was by then called The American Sunbathing Association.) He traveled to Germany in the early 1930s to visit Freilichtpark (Free-Light Park) near Hamburg, the world's first naturist resort, which had opened nearly three decades earlier. During this time he also became a member of both the New York and Royal Microscopy Societies.

In 1936 Boone opened "Sunshine Park" in the Mays Landing section of Hamilton Township, New Jersey (near Atlantic City), and established the national headquarters of the American Sunbathing Association there. As a faithful adherent to Barthel's original ideals and behavior guidelines, "Uncle Danny" (Note: Boone was known as "Uncle Danny" among relatives and friends, an allusion to Daniel Boone.) advocated the development of new nudist clubs, often leading legal challenges fighting local officials trying to block nudist centers in their area. He encouraged regimens of calisthenics, abstinence (alcohol), complete nudity regardless of the weather, and vegetarianism for all members and their guests. This was in addition to his overall beliefs of healthful benefits derived from the combination of nudity, sunbathing, and exercise. In 1965 the park was purchased by psychologist Oliver York for $120,000. It continued for another two decades until health violations of the aging buildings forced its closure by the city.

== Later years ==
Boone's second wife died in 1960 and he became a widower for the last eight years of his life. Due to the proliferation of more successful competing nudist and adult publications, his Sunshine Publishing Company went out of business in 1963. Nearly broke, Boone lived his last years in the home of National Nudist Council member Edith Church, where he died on Thanksgiving Day, 1968, in Whitehouse, Ohio. at age 89. His magazine Sunshine & Health continued under another publisher into the 1980s, making it the longest published nudist magazine in America.

== Publications ==
Following his ordination, Boone served a number of pastorates and wrote a number of books dealing with the divine, the most notable being The Conquering Christ. By 1933, however, Boone's interest in nudism led to publishing the first American nudist magazine, The Nudist (with Henry S. Huntington as its editor) which later became Sunshine & Health, published by his Sunshine Publishing Company. Even with the genitalia airbrushed out of the photos of nudists, the United States Postal Service decided the materials were obscene and could not be distributed through the U.S. mail. Boone challenged the decision and took his case all the way to the United States Supreme Court.

In 1958, he ultimately won the right to distribute uncensored nudist materials through the mail. The victory enabled not only legitimate nudist magazines and men's magazines to feature full frontal nudity (including Hugh Hefner's Playboy Magazine), but also unintentionally helped make possible the later oncoming flood of explicit adult publications during the 1960s sexual revolution.

=== Books ===
- Boone, Ilsley (1902). Life Among Lobsters.
- Boone, Ilsley (1910). The Conquering Christ. General Books LLC. ISBN 978-1-153-33786-1.
- Boone, Ilsley (1934). The Joys of Nudism. Greenberg.
- Boone, Ilsley (1934). The ABC of Nudism: An Illustrated Handbook on the Movement in America, Its Practice and Philosophy. Sunshine Book Company.
- Boone, Ilsley (1949). Why Nudism: What Contribution Can the American Nudist Movement Make to Happier Human Lives?. American Sunbathing Association.
- Boone, Ilsley; Theodore, Schroeder (1949). Evolutionary Psychology: Hints as to Its Factors, Importance, Uses, and Resulting Changes for Our Whole Social Order : Also, Some Information by and about Theodore Schroeder. Stamford, CT: Next Century Fund.

=== Periodicals ===
- College Hill Verse: Being selections from student publications of Brown University 1894-1904 (editor, 1904)
- The Nudist (later known as Sunshine & Health) (1933-1963)

== See also ==
- Christian naturism
- Clothes free organizations
- Naturism
- Public nudity
- Skinny dipping
