= McGee v. International Life Insurance Co. =

- Supreme Court of the United States

Argued November 20, 1957 Decided December 16, 1957
- Full case name: McGee v. International Life Insurance Company
- Citations: 355 U.S. 220 (more) 78 S. Ct. 199; 2 L. Ed. 2d 223; 1957 U.S. LEXIS 2

Case history
- Prior: McGee v. International Life Insurance Co., 288 S.W.2d 579 (Tex. App. 1956)

Holding
- California's long-arm statute did not violate Due Process and the court rightly entered judgment over International Life Insurance. Reversed and remanded.

Court membership
- Chief Justice Earl Warren Associate Justices Hugo Black · Felix Frankfurter; William O. Douglas · Harold H. Burton; Tom C. Clark · John M. Harlan II; William J. Brennan Jr. · Charles E. Whittaker

Case opinion
- Majority: Black, joined by Frankfurter, Douglas, Burton, Clark, Harlan, Brennan, Whittaker
- Warren took no part in the consideration or decision of the case.

Laws applied
- 28 U.S.C. § 1738

McGee v. International Life Insurance Co., 355 U.S. 220 (1957), was a case following in the line of decisions interpreting International Shoe v. Washington. The Court declared that California did not violate the Due Process Clause by entering a judgment upon a Texas insurance company who was engaged in a dispute over a policy it maintained with a California resident. The importance of this finding is highlighted by the facts of the case; mainly that International Life Insurance did no other business within the state of California besides maintaining this single policy, which the company became responsible for by its acquisition of another insurance company which previously had held the policy. However; the case never explicitly stated that no other business was conducted within California and the previous assumption is presumptive by definition.

== Facts ==
The plaintiff, Lulu McGee, was the mother of Lowell Franklin. He purchased a life insurance policy from Arizona-based Empire Mutual Insurance Company that named McGee as the beneficiary. In 1948, International Life Insurance Co. ("International"), a Texas corporation, agreed to assume Empire's insurance obligations. International mailed a reinsurance certificate to the California policy holder, offering to insure Lowell according to the terms of the Empire policy. Lowell accepted the offer and paid premiums from California until his death in 1950. When Lowell's mother tried to collect on the policy, the insurance company refused to pay, claiming Lowell had committed suicide. International conducted no business in California aside from this policy.

== Procedural history ==
McGee sued International in a California court. She was able to do so because California had enacted a long-arm statute which enabled the state courts to have jurisdiction over out of state insurance companies who held policies with in-state residents. The California court entered a judgment in favor of McGee. Because International had no property within the state of California, and therefore nothing which California could seize through judicial decree, that state's courts were powerless to enforce any judgment against the company.

McGee then attempted to have her California judgment enforced by a Texas court through the use of the Full Faith and Credit Clause of the United States Constitution. The Texas courts refused to give California full faith and credit on its judgment, claiming that the California court overreached its constitutional authority by holding jurisdiction over International. Texas' main point of contention was that California had not issued service of process to International within its own borders, a theory which had, until recent case law, been correct.

McGee filed a petition for certiorari and it was granted by the Warren Court.

== Main questions for the court ==
The relevant question for the court was whether the Due Process Clause precluded the California court from entering a binding judgment on International.

== Holding and reasoning ==
The Court held that California did not violate the Due Process Clause by entering a judgment on the Texas corporation.

The court relied on the fact that the suit was based on "substantial connection[s]" with California, particularly the facts that the contract was delivered to McGee's son while he was a resident of California, International continued to maintain a financial relationship with McGee's son by collecting his premium payments, and that the policy holder was a resident of the state when he died.

The court also gave weight to California's interest in protecting its residents as consumers of insurance policies, and validated the long-arm statute which gave the California courts their power of jurisdiction over out of state companies by declaring that California had a "manifest interest in providing effective means of redress for its residents ..."

== Significance ==
The Court continued its trend towards a greater expansion of personal jurisdiction that falls within the Constitutional limits of due process. This decision reflected a growing and increasingly more sophisticated economy, in which more commercial transactions were taking place across state lines.

== See also ==
- List of United States Supreme Court cases, volume 355
