= Alcorta v. Texas =

- Supreme Court of the United States

Decided November 12, 1957
- Full case name: Alcorta v. Texas
- Citations: 355 U.S. 28 (more)

Holding
- Perjury from a prosecution witness is a due process violation when the prosecutor knows the witness testimony is false.

Court membership
- Chief Justice Earl Warren Associate Justices Hugo Black · Felix Frankfurter; William O. Douglas · Harold H. Burton; Tom C. Clark · John M. Harlan II; William J. Brennan Jr. · Charles E. Whittaker

Case opinion
- Per curiam

Alcorta v. Texas, 355 U.S. 28 (1957), was a United States Supreme Court case in which the Court held that perjury from a prosecution witness is a due process violation when the prosecutor knows the witness testimony is false.

== Description ==
The prosecutor in this case told the witness to withhold information about a serious romantic relationship unless specifically asked about it, so the witness falsely claimed that the relationship was casual. The false statement was irrelevant to the prosecution's case and would have only gone to the witness's credibility; even so, the case was tainted such that the Supreme Court reversed the defendant's conviction.
