= American Association for Nude Recreation =

American naturism advocacy organization

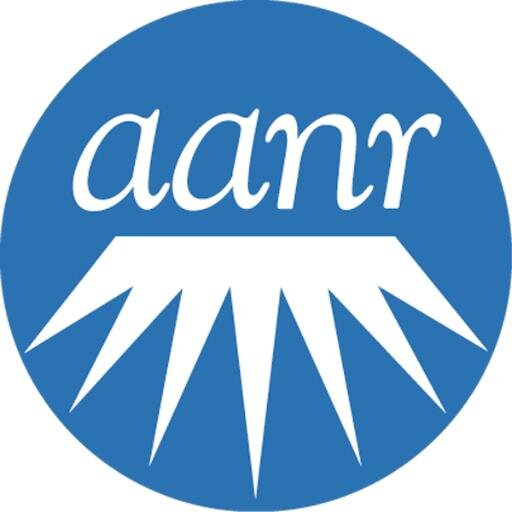
- Predecessor: International Nudist Conference (INC); American Sunbathing Association (ASA)
- Established: November 1931; 95 years ago
- Founders: Henry S. Huntington, Ilsley Boone
- Type: 501(c)(7)
- Purpose: Naturist advocacy
- Headquarters: Kissimmee, Florida, United States
- Region served: United States, Canada, Mexico, French West Indies, Virgin Islands, and St. Martin.
- Services: Membership organization, newsletter publisher, education/advocacy
- Members: over 30,000 members and more than 200 clubs (2015)
- Executive Director: Erich Schuttauf
- Website: www.aanr.com

The American Association for Nude Recreation (AANR) is a naturist organization based in the United States.

The AANR is the largest and longest-established naturist organization in North America. It was founded in 1931 under its previous name, the American Sunbathing Association. Approximately 200 nudist resorts, clubs, and businesses are affiliated to the AANR, and it serves over 30,000 members in the United States, Canada, Mexico, the French West Indies, the Virgin Islands and Saint Martin.

The AANR promotes the benefits of nude family recreation and works to protect the rights of nudists in appropriate settings, such as sanctioned nude beaches and public lands set aside for that use; as well as homes, private backyards, and AANR-affiliated clubs, campgrounds and resorts.

The AANR uses a portion of its collected membership fees to be politically active by campaigning and lobbying governments to allow nudism in the US and Canada.

== History ==
In 1929 Kurt Barthel started the first American nudist organization known as the American League for Physical Culture (ALPC). In December 1931, a second nudist organization was founded under the name of the International Nudist League. It was soon renamed the International Nudist Conference, and after several years it was renamed again, this time as the American Sunbathing Association. Ilsley Boone was listed as its General Secretary.

The Association was established with its office at Mays Landing, New Jersey. During the Second World War, the nudist movement was disrupted as many of its members left and went to war, resulting in the closure of several nudist resorts and clubs. By 1946 the Association had many dissatisfied members. Boone was seen as micro-managing the organisation. He also controlled the mailing lists in order to receive enough proxy votes to keep control of elected votes and elected officials.

In 1951, new bylaws were instituted within the Association and a change was made to the governing board. Following a court ruling, the changes were approved a year later by the 1952 convention. Boone left the organization, but continued to stay active in the nudist movement by founding the National Nudist Council and starting the magazine S.U.N. (Solair Union Naturisme).

The Association moved to Orlando, Florida, and then to its present location in Kissimmee, Florida. It changed its name again in 1995 to its current name, the American Association for Nude Recreation (AANR). The Association's electoral system was converted to one member, one vote and it is now governed by a 10-person board with seven voting trustees and three officers.

== Member associations ==
The AANR also belongs to several other organizations, such as the American Recreation Coalition (ARC), National Association of RV Parks and Campgrounds, and others.

== Membership ==
=== Clubs ===
AANR-affiliated (chartered) clubs include both nudist resorts and naturist social clubs that agree to AANR principles and standards. There are a wide range of various types of nudist resorts and clubs affiliated with AANR that are as individual as their members and visitors. They must meet AANR principles and standards and endeavor to provide a friendly, stress free atmosphere where people enjoy social nude recreation with their family and friends. Clubs range from clothing optional to no clothes allowed. Chartered clubs also range from land-based clubs to beach clubs and even travel clubs, known as non-landed (not site-based).

Many AANR-affiliated clubs and resorts are also affiliated with The Naturist Society, and the TNS membership card usually has equal status to the AANR membership card at landed clubs and resorts.

=== People ===
Individuals typically become members on an annual basis usually via paid annual memberships at chartered clubs which includes partial fees for AANR membership, although lifetime memberships are also available. There is also a direct membership option through AANR as well as a discount to younger single members. Membership in AANR includes a subscription to The Bulletin, AANR's monthly magazine. The Bulletin contains articles on naturist activities and issues related to naturism. The Bulletin began as an insert in the Sunshine & Health magazine in the 1940s, and became a standalone publication in 1952.
