= Sunshine & Health =

Nudist magazine

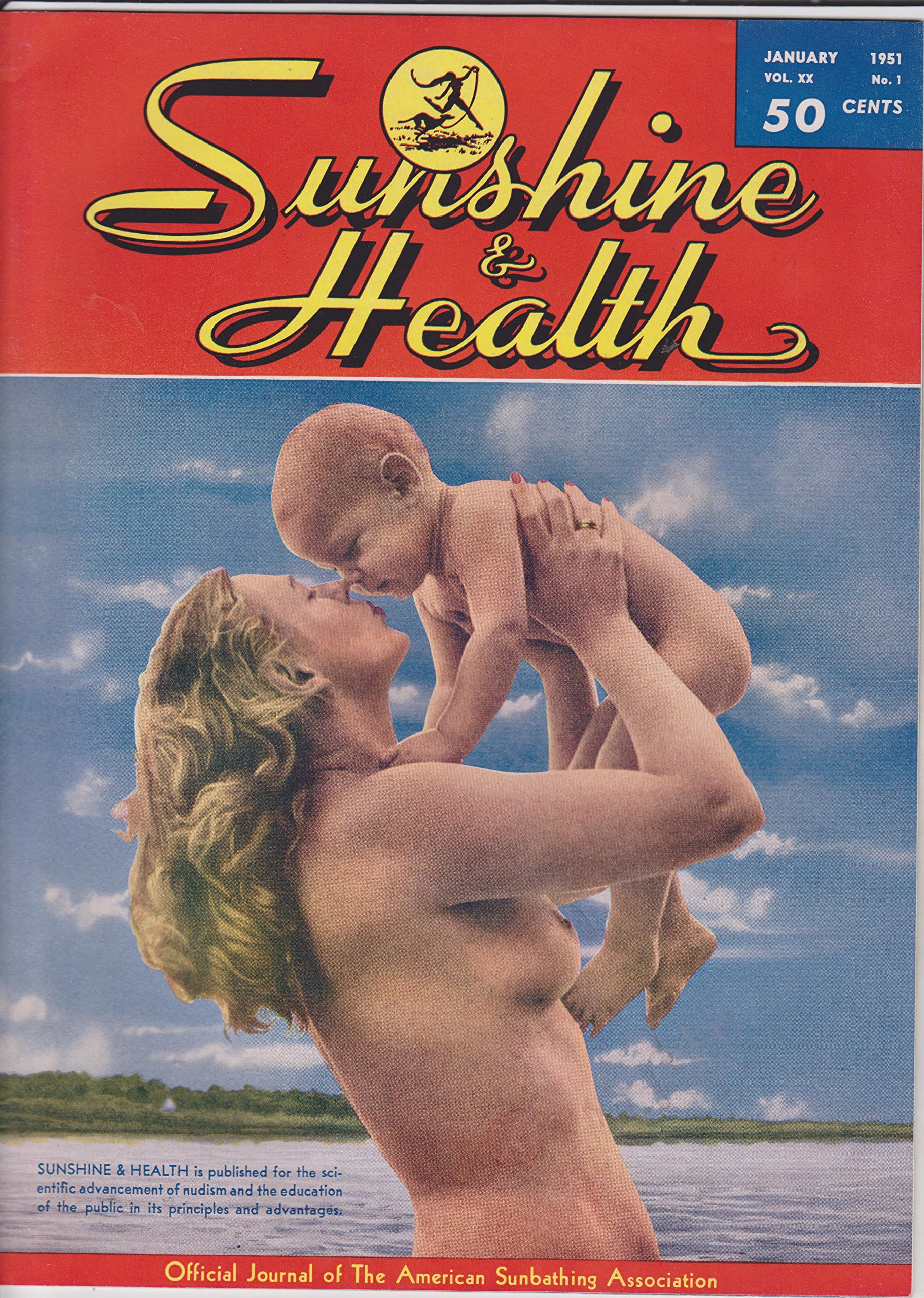
- Cover of the January 1951 issue of Sunshine & Health
- Frequency: monthly
- First issue: 1933
- Final issue: 1963
- Based in: New Jersey

Sunshine & Health (originally The Nudist) was an American nudist magazine published from 1933 until 1963. It has been described as the "flagship magazine" of the nudist movement in the US. It was published monthly, and sold at newsstands as well as being distributed by subscription through the mail.

Though popular, the magazine faced a series of legal challenges relating to obscenity, particularly from the US Post Office, which repeatedly attempted to declare it nonmailable. This culminated in a favourable Supreme Court decision in Sunshine Book Co. v. Summerfield (1958). The subsequent weakening of obscenity enforcement ultimately hurt the magazine's circulation, as more sexually explicit magazines out-competed it, and it went bankrupt in 1963.

== Editorial staff ==
The Nudist was a publication of the International Nudist Conference, which was founded in 1931 and later became the National Nudism Organization. At the launch of the magazine in 1933, Henry S. Huntington (the president of the Conference) served as editor, and Ilsley Boone (secretary of the Conference) was named as managing editor. Later, Boone's daughter, Margaret A. B. Pulis would also serve as editor. As of the early 1950s, the magazine's operations were based in Mays Landing, New Jersey.

== Circulation and audience ==
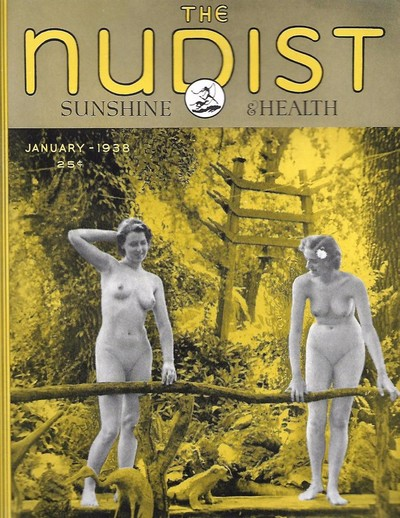
As of 1938, the magazine was still under the title The Nudist, but included Sunshine & Health as a subtitle. During this era, photographs such as these were airbrushed to avoid visible genitalia and pubic hair.

The first issue of The Nudist sold 10,000 copies, and the subsequent issue sold 50,000. Given that the magazine's circulation far exceeded the International Nudist Conference's total membership, and that most copies were sold at newsstands rather than by subscription, it is believed that many readers bought the magazine for sexual titillation, rather than out of an interest in nudism per se. The magazine attempted to gain a more respectable image by changing its name to Sunshine & Health.

The magazine saw a large increase in popularity during World War II, as it was enjoyed by American soldiers as pornographic gratification, and the magazine increasingly used suggestive poses to appeal to this audience. Because it also included nude men, the magazine could also serve as a covert source of gratification for gay soldiers.

Sunshine & Health magazine went bankrupt in 1963. Its decline has been attributed to increasing competition from more explicitly pornographic periodicals which emerged in the wake of a series of court rulings which relaxed the legal definition of obscenity, including its own Supreme Court victory in Sunshine Book Co. v. Summerfield.

== Content ==
The magazine included a combination of reporting related to the nudist movement and photographs of nudist men, women and children engaging in various activities.

In a concession to postal authorities, the magazine initially avoided depictions of visible genitalia or pubic hair, using airbrushing to obscure them as necessary. Beginning around 1943, the magazine gradually relaxed this self-censorship policy, with photos increasingly including visible pubic hair and genitals (initially from a distance).

A judge described the literary content of some 1951 issues of Sunshine & Health and sister publication SUN Magazine (also produced by Boone, but with an international scope) as:

reports of meeting and conventions, reports of officers, the "Olympic Games" of the movement, public relations theories for the expansion of nudism, reports of regional associations and local clubs, conflicts between nudism and the law, expositions of nudism for the advancement of physical and mental health, religious justifications of nudism, etc.

The photographs in the same issues were described as a combination of "action pictures showing nudists in their camp activities, rowing, hitting volley balls, building fires, etc." as well as photos of "shapely and attractive young women in alluring poses". The judge noted that cover photos invariably belonged to the second category.

== Legal troubles ==
Sunshine & Health faced a number of legal challenges, particularly from the US Post Office.

In 1946, postal inspectors began an investigation of those placing letters and pen-pal notices in the magazine, suspecting them of sending nude photographs through the mail.

Between 1948 and 1956, the magazine faced three separate investigations by the Post Office, in which issues were seized under suspicion of being nonmailable. Each case was eventually dismissed, but the effect on the magazine's distribution caused a significant financial burden.

In New York City in 1951, several newsstand clerks were arrested for selling copies of Sunshine & Health and SUN Magazine, violating a state statute prohibiting the distribution of obscene materials. Newsstands were subsequently notified by the city's Department of Licenses that continuing to sell the magazines would result in losing their licenses. Initial appeals were unsuccessful, but six years later a New York appeals court found that the city's action was an unconstitutional act of prior restraint, violating the publisher's First Amendment rights.

=== Sunshine Book Co. v. Summerfield ===
In January 1955, Boone's Sunshine Book Company filed a complaint in US district court seeking an injunction to stop the Post Office's continued seizure of the magazine. They were represented by attorneys O. John Rogge and Josiah Lyman. Judge James Robert Kirkland ruled against the magazine, writing that the "American people are a clothed race", and identifying certain particular photographs as objectionable, such as a side view of a nude man with "the corona of his penis ... clearly discernible". The case was appealed to the District of Columbia Court of Appeals, which overturned the decision by a 2–1 vote in May 1956. The government petitioned for an en banc review, and the District of Columbia Circuit Court of Appeals again reversed the earlier decision, finding in favour of the government by a 5–3 vote. Finally, the publisher appealed to the US Supreme Court. A short per curiam decision in Sunshine Book Co. v. Summerfield was handed down on January 13, 1958, finding in favour of the publisher, citing the earlier case Roth v. United States. On the same day, the court issued a similar decision in One, Inc. v. Olesen, which concerned similar actions taken by the Post Office against ONE, a magazine dedicated to the homophile movement.
