= Elton Raymond Shaw =

American churchman, author, educator and naturist

Elton Shaw
- Born: 19 January 1886; Grand Rapids, Michigan, United States
- Died: 10 October 1955 (aged 69); Washington, D.C., United States
- Education: Ohio Wesleyan University
- Spouse: Mable Bacon
- Parent(s): Solomon Shaw; Etta Sadler

Elton Raymond Shaw (19 January 1886 – 10 October 1955) was a churchman, author and publisher, lecturer and educator, campaigner in the prohibition and temperance movement and a naturist.

== Early life ==
Shaw was born in Grand Rapids, Michigan, on 19 January 1886 to Rev'd Solomon Benjamin Shaw and Etta Ellen Sadler. He graduated from Ohio Wesleyan University with a double major in history and oratory and minors in English, political science and social science. Shaw led the debating team, was president of the Prohibition League, and president of the Literary Society. In 1900, he was living with a widowed aunt and his cousins in Chicago, Illinois. By 1910, he was married and living in Grand Rapids with his wife Mable (née Bacon) and her parents.

== Naturism ==
In 1937, Elton published his book on nudism The Body Taboo: Its Origins, Effects and Modern Denial. He authored this work in Lansing, Michigan, and published out of new offices in Washington D.C.

In a Lansing State Journal article dated August 24, 1936, Shaw explained his interest in nudism began when he learned of the 1934 case of People vs. Ring. Shaw believed “famed Kalamazoo nudist leader, Fred Ring” had received a “raw deal” relating to his prosecution stemming from charges at an Allegan County nudist camp.

Shaw was also an opponent of the Comstock laws. He wrote the book What Shall We Do with the "Comstock" Law and the Post Office Censorship Power?.

== Prohibition and Temperance ==
Shaw wrote a number of books on this topic and was an office holder in various committees including the Prohibition State Committee of Michigan (and later for Ohio) and the Intercollegiate Prohibition Association.

== Church work ==
Shaw served in leadership roles in the Methodist Episcopal Church.

== Publishing ==
Shaw was president of Shaw Publishing Company (formerly S. B. Shaw, Publisher founded in 1893 by his father Solomon Shaw).

== Publications ==
- The Body Taboo: Its Origin, Effect, and Modern Denial. Sunshine Book Company. 1951.
- Beer and Prosperity, Some Economic and Governmental Aspects of National Prohibition. Shaw Publishing. 1933.
- The national debt and our future: a look ahead on the Chase-Hansen-Berle superhighway to deficit spending prosperity. Shaw publishing company. 1946.
- Legal Liquor and Chaos: Or Continued Improvement Under National Prohibition More Adequately Enforced and Sustained by Nation-wide Education. Shaw Publishing Company. 1933.
- Green light to dictatorship: Abraham Lincoln speaks to us in this hour of danger. Shaw publishing company. 1943.
- The love affairs of Washington and Lincoln: the love affairs of Abraham Lincoln, the boyhood and love affairs of Washington. Shaw Publishing Company. 1923.
- Prohibition: Going Or Coming?: The Eighteenth Amendment and the Volstead Act; Facts Versus Fallacies and Suggestions for the Future. Shaw Publishing Company. 1924. which was co-written with Wayne Wheeler
- The Man of Galilee: A Short Sketch of Christ's Three Years of Ministry (1912). Kessinger Publishing. September 2010. ISBN 978-1-165-82957-6.
- The Conquest of the Southwest. Literary Licensing, LLC. March 2013. ISBN 978-1-258-62466-8.
- What Shall We Do with the "Comstock" Law and the Post Office Censorship Power?. National Committee for Revision of the "Comstock" Law. 1938.

== Notes and references ==
- Dave Votta (2011-01-23). "Lost Lansing: Elton Shaw promoted temperance and sunbathing". Lansing Online News. Archived from the original on April 20, 2011.
- Shaw, Elton Raymond (1951). The Body Taboo: Its Origin, Effect, and Modern Denial. Sunshine Book Company.
- "People vs Ring". Find A Case. 1934-06-04. Archived from the original on 2014-08-12.
- Shaw, Elton Raymond (1938). What Shall We Do with the "Comstock" Law and the Post Office Censorship Power?. National Committee for Revision of the "Comstock" Law.
