= Henry S. Huntington =

American Presbyterian minister, advocate of nudism and eugenics

Henry Strong Huntington Jr. (1882-1981), was a Presbyterian minister who advocated the healthful advantages of nudism. He established the Burgoyne Trail Nudist Camp near Otis, Massachusetts. He was editor of the magazine, The Nudist. He was also an advocate of eugenics.

== Clerical career ==
Huntington was born in Gorham, Maine, where his father was a Congregational church minister. He graduated from Yale University in 1904 and was ordained as a minister in 1911 at the Auburn Theological Seminary, and became the minister of the Hope Presbyterian Church in Watertown, N.Y.

After his ordination he became survey secretary of the Presbyterian Synod of New York. During World War I, Huntington was a member of the American Red Cross Commission in Palestine. After the war, he became active in the Interchurch World Movement and from 1919 to 1925 he was associate editor of the periodical, Christian Work.

== Nudism ==
Huntington first encountered the nudist movement on a trip to Germany in 1926. His interest continued after later trips to Britain, France and, a further visit to Germany. In 1929, he joined the American League for Physical Culture, an early promoter of organized nudism in the United States. He helped to prepare the league's statement of principles and standards. This statement became the American nudist movement's statement on the meaning and philosophy of nudism.

In 1931, Huntington was elected the first president of the International Nudist Conference, an American group, which later became the National Nudism Organization, and in 1933 he became the first editor of The Nudist magazine, later called Sunshine and Health. In the same year, Huntington, with an associate, the Revd Ilsley Boone, established the Burgoyne Trail Nudist Camp near Otis, Massachusetts. This was one of the first nudist camps in the United States.

In 1932, Huntington addressed the first nudist convention held in the United States, this convention took place in Highland, NY, At that convention Huntington said that "the goodness of man and the possible satisfactoriness of life make the nudist feel that God is a very kind and friendly being.” He later described his forest frolicking with similarly minded friends as “poetry incarnate”.

In 1934 he attended the International Nudist Conference in Akron, Ohio at which Ilsley Boone was the president, Huntington was introduced as the editor of the magazine, The Nudist.

== Eugenics ==
Huntington's brother, Ellsworth Huntington, was a Yale University geographer and member of the American Eugenics Society (AES). In 1925 the AES authorized the establishment of three committees, one of which was the Committee on Cooperation with Clergymen. Of the three, it was this one that would become one of the largest and most well-funded of the fourteen standing committees of the Society. The AES named Ellsworth's brother the Revd Henry Huntington to head the clergymen's committee.

It was left to Henry Huntington to develop a program and draft religious leaders into the committee. Huntington had an innate intellectual restlessness which led him to exotic travels and many odd jobs before his editorship at the Christian Work magazine in the early 1920s.

Huntington had been interested in eugenics for some time, and (perhaps under the influence of his brother Ellsworth) had devoted considerable time to studying the major theorists of the movement. He wrote the pamphlet, Baptist Babies, published by the Northern Baptist Convention. This tract was sent to every Baptist minister in the convention. The pamphlet described the eugenics program and made a plea for payments given per child to defray the costs of bearing and raising children, specifically for the clergy.

While in Palestine with the Red Cross Commission in 1916, he wrote to the eugenicist and biologist, Charles Davenport to request copies of the Eugenics Record Office's Record of Family Traits, noting that he was "intensely interested in the practical implications of eugenics” and believed that “we can educate the people here and educate them within a generation” about its importance.

In a letter to potential members of the AES's Committee on Cooperation with Clergymen, Huntington repeated these educational hopes and described the committee as a forum to "work out methods of forwarding the teaching of eugenics through the churches” and to locate “new opportunities for the usefulness of the churches" in the eugenics campaign. By 1927, Huntington had convinced thirty-nine prominent ministers to join the Committee on Cooperation.

== Later life ==
In 1938, Huntington resigned his ministry, declaring himself a humanist and an agnostic; he eventually joined the Philadelphia Ethical Society.

Huntington died in February 1981 at the Unitarian-Universalist House in Philadelphia, where he lived. He was 99 years old. He was survived by two daughters, Alice Allen of Amherst, Mass., Mary of Hightstown, N.J., three sons, Henry S. of Dedham, Mass., Thomas F. of Princeton, N.J. and David C. of Ann Arbor, Mich., 13 grandchildren and five great-grandchildren.

== Published works ==
- Tangents. 1925.
- Defense of Nudism. R.M. McBride Company. 1958.
- Cabbage Philosophy. Hong Kong. 1969. ASIN B0178OKLMW.
