= Solstice Cyclists =

Artistic clothing-optional bike ride

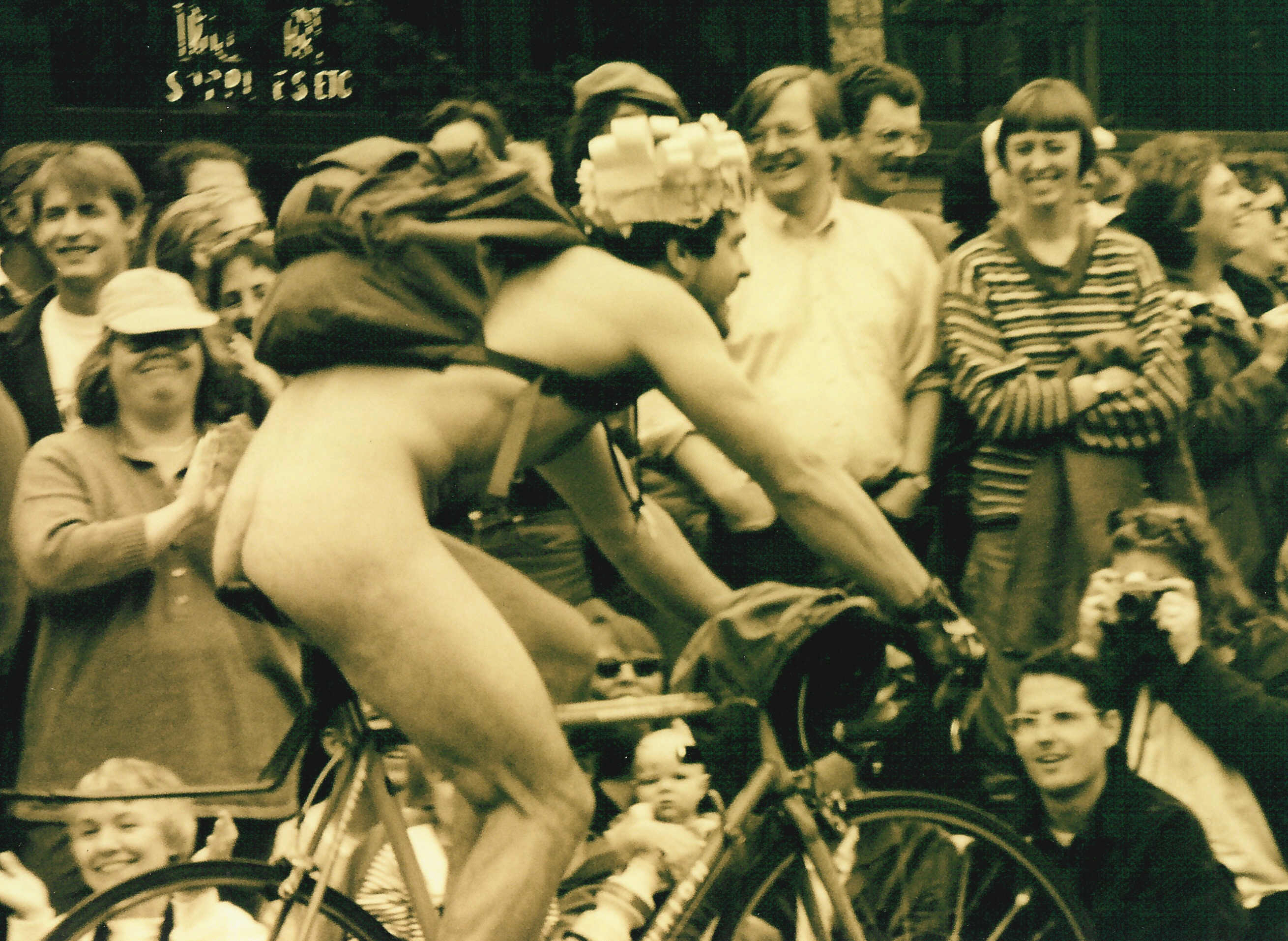
Naked cyclist streaking the 1995 Summer Solstice Parade. This would have been before this had become an established tradition; at this time the police were still hassling naked cyclists in the parade.

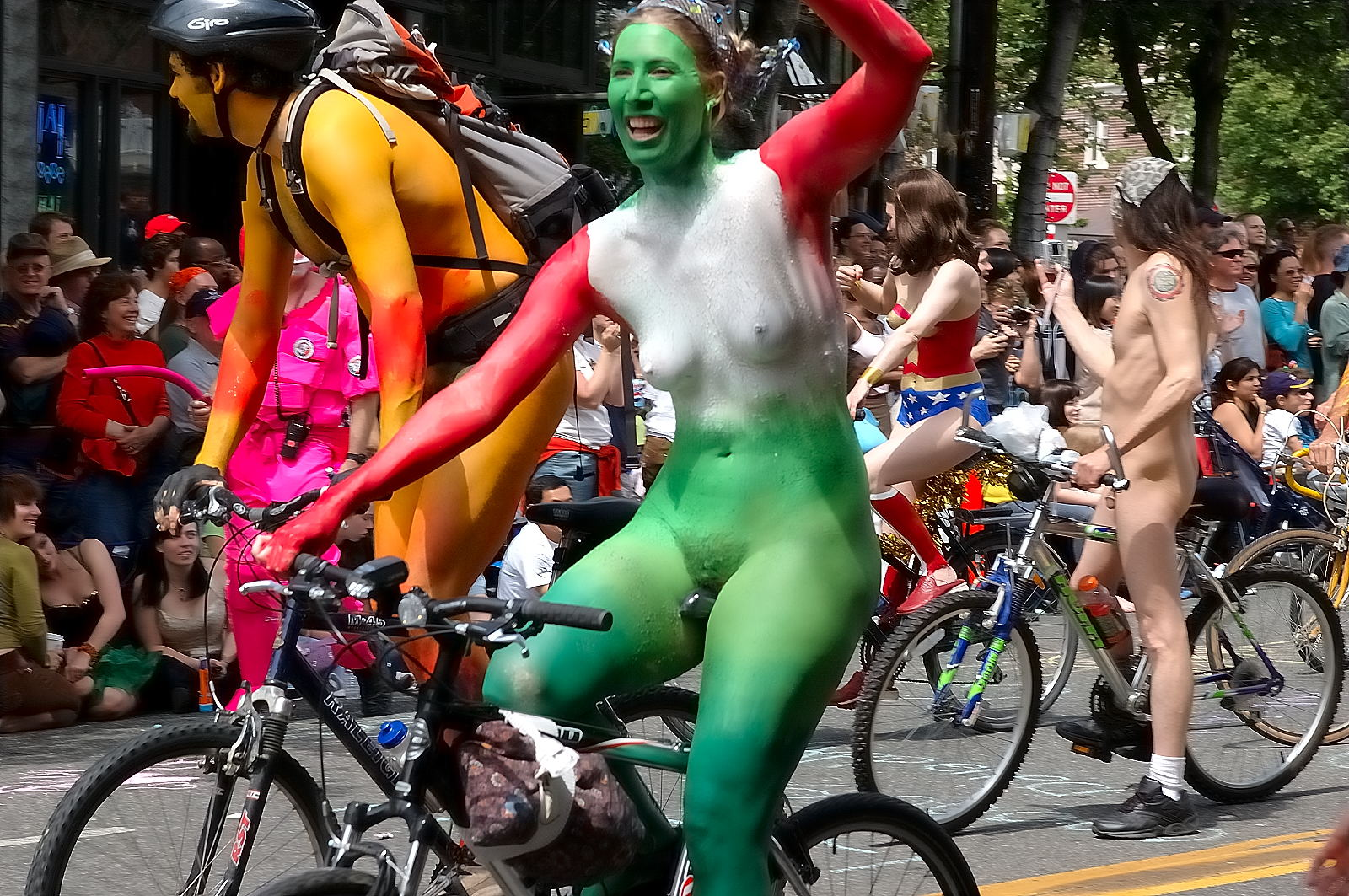
Fremont Solstice Parade, 2005

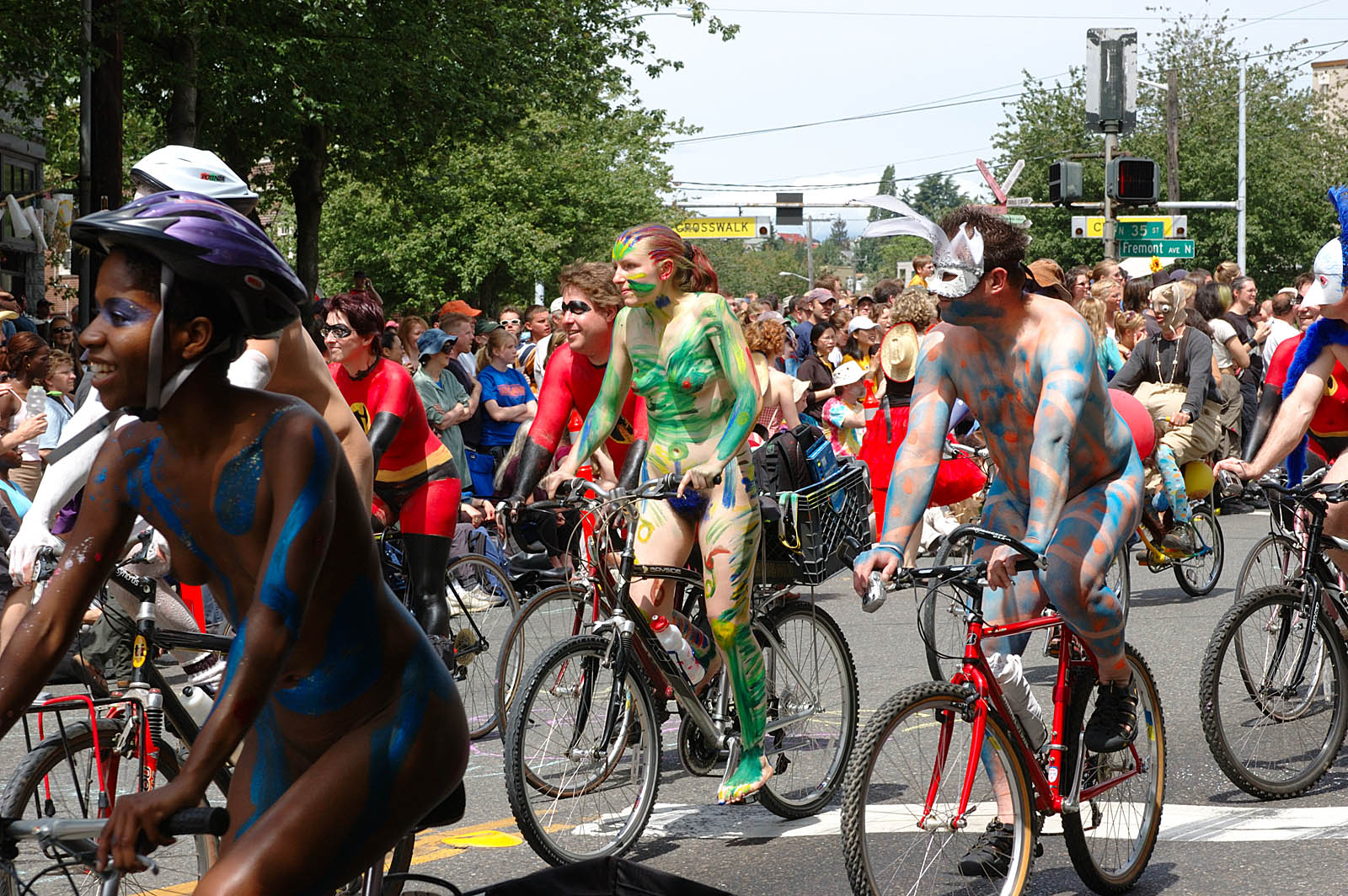
(2005)

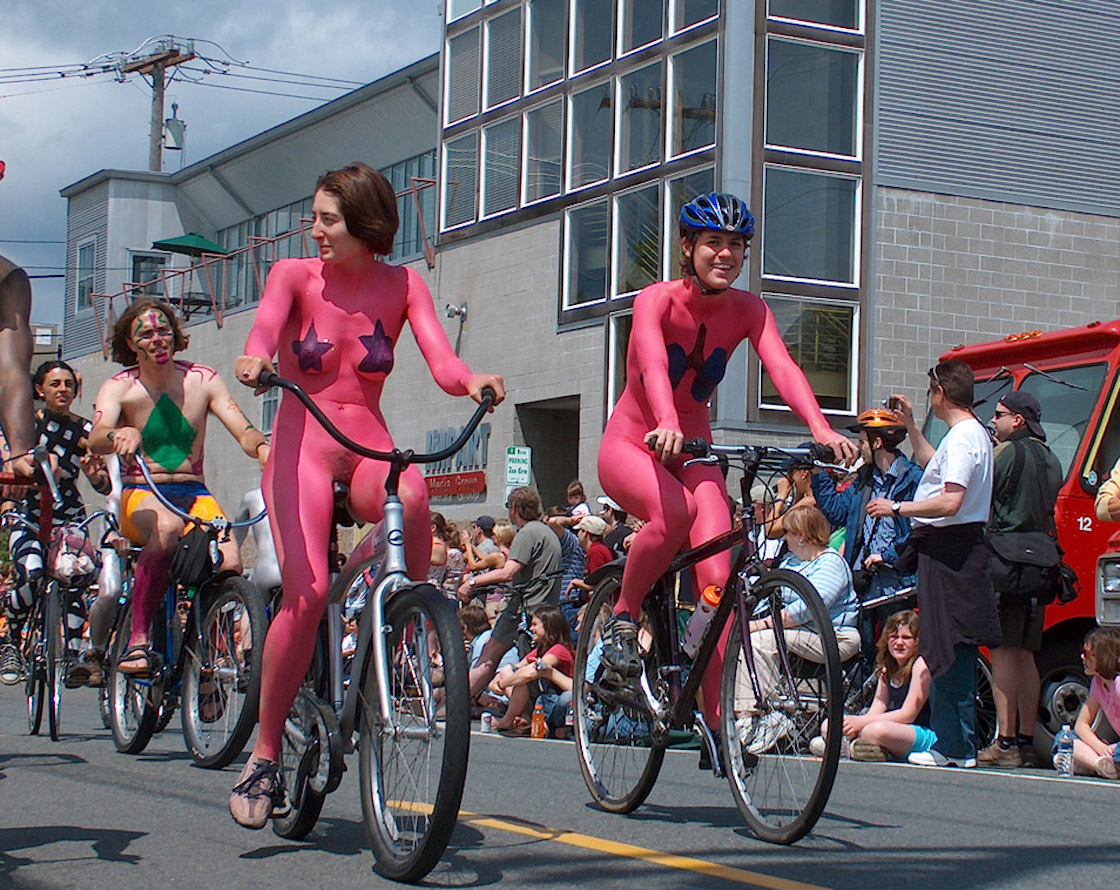
(2007)

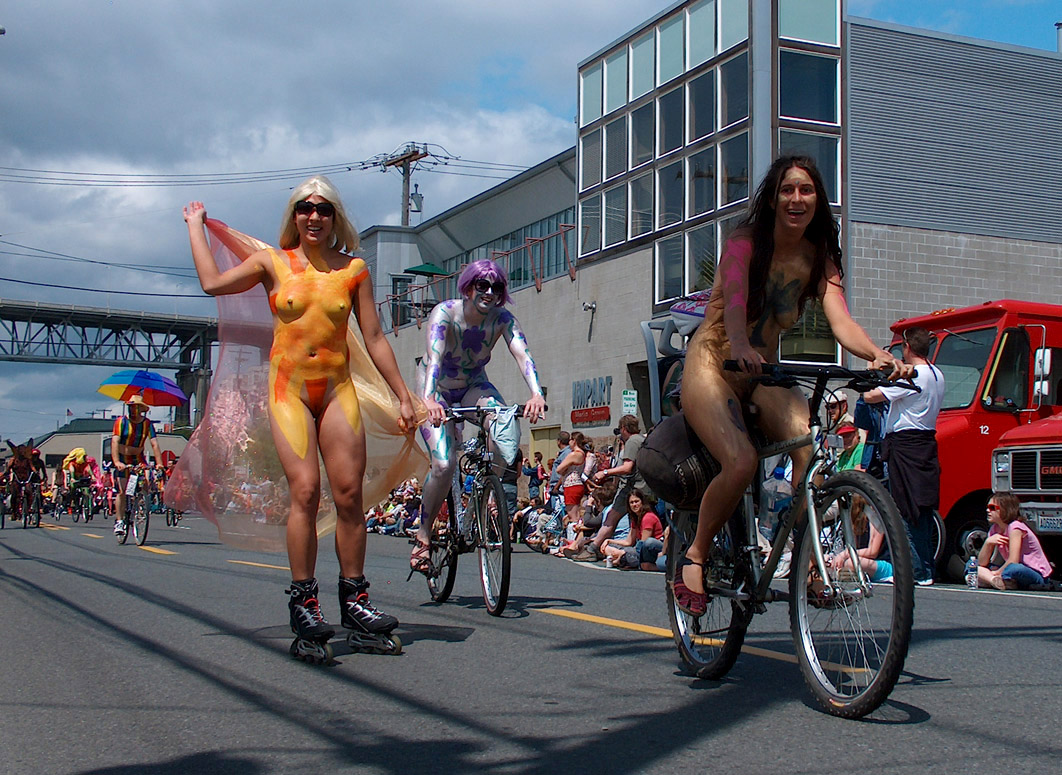
Painted Inline skaters often join the cyclists. (2007)

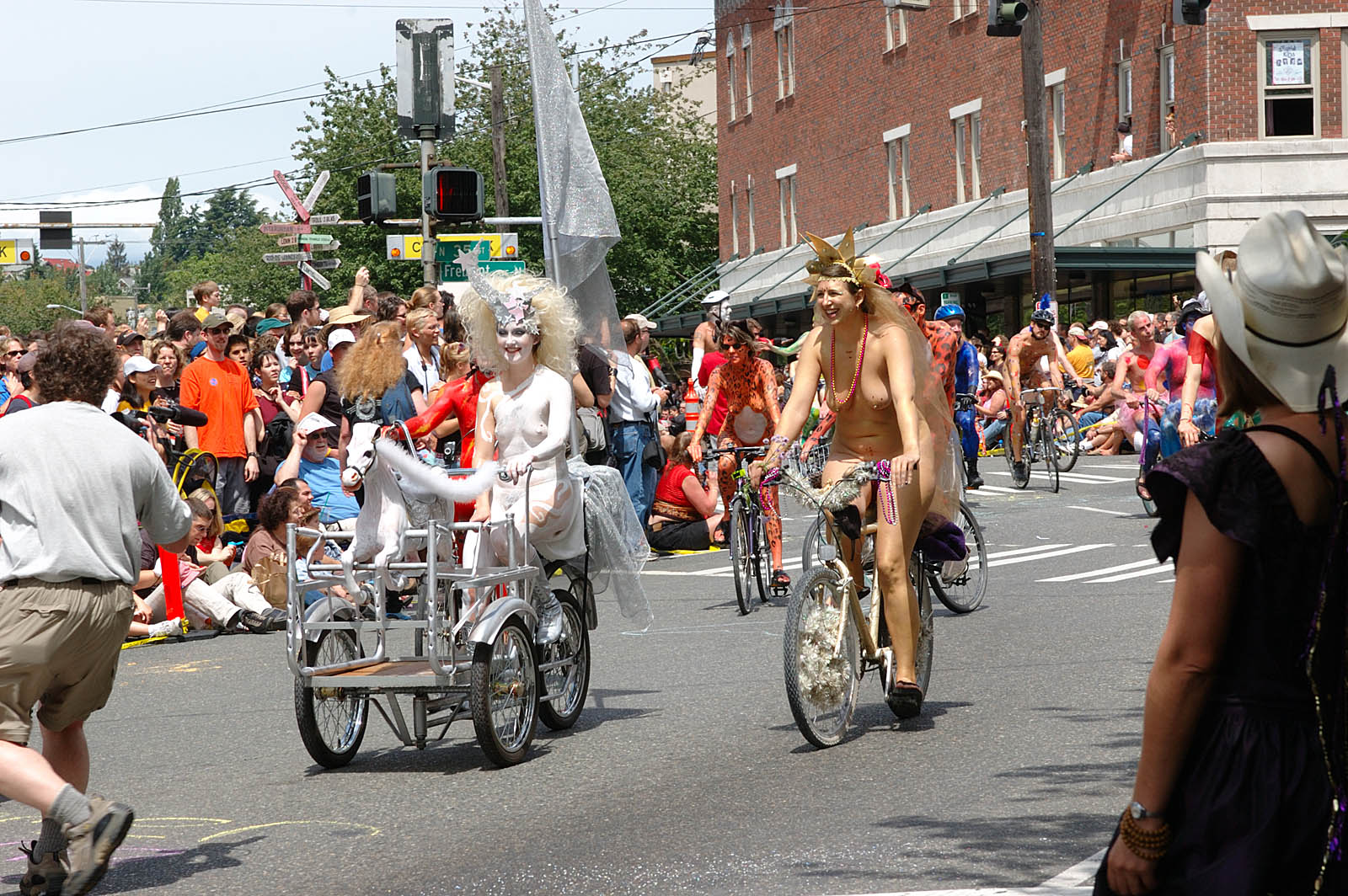
Art bikes, as seen here (2005) and below (2007), are becoming increasingly popular.

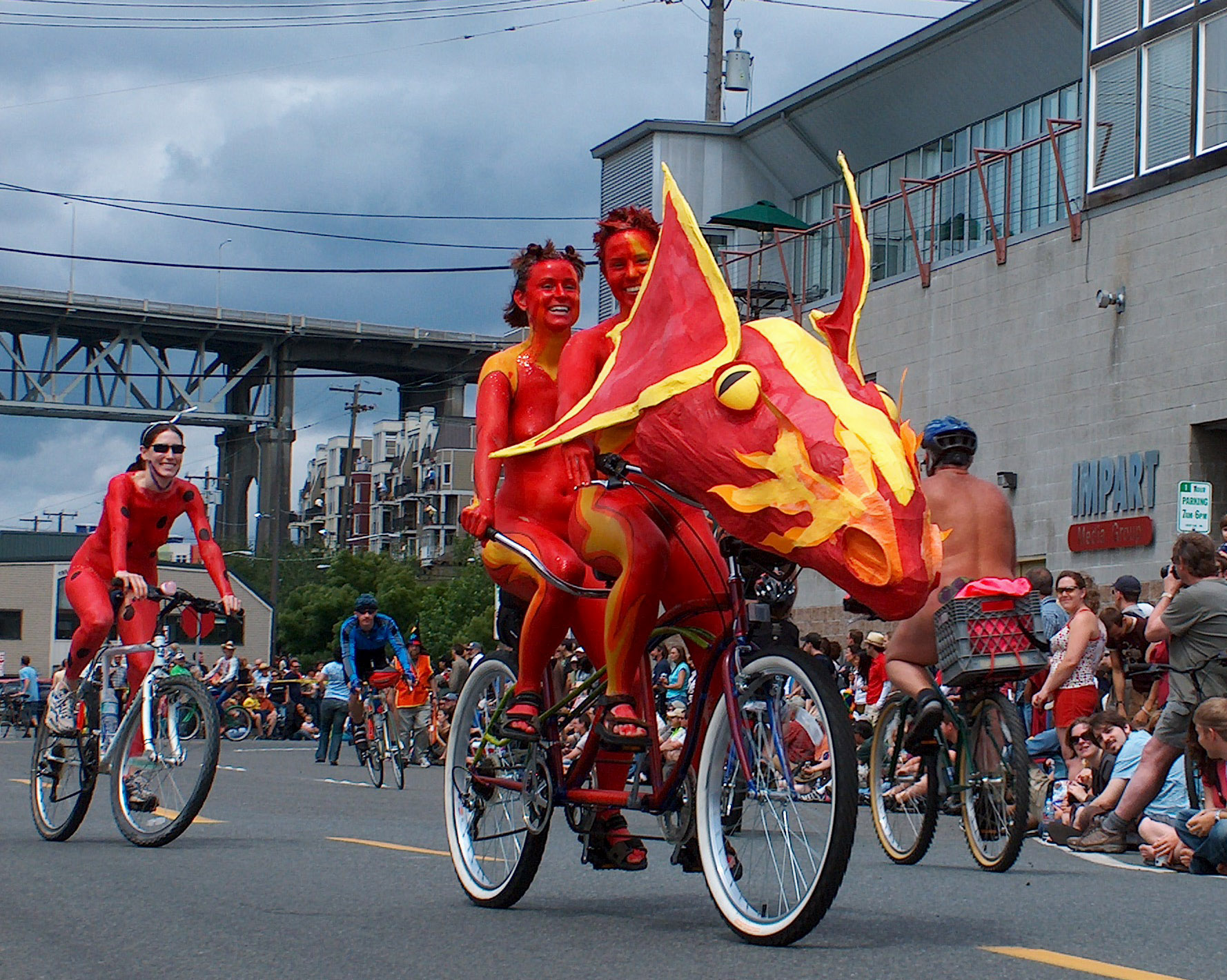

The Solstice Cyclists (also known as The Painted [Naked] Cyclists of the Solstice Parade, or The Painted Cyclists) is an artistic, non-political, clothing-optional bike ride celebrating the summer solstice. It is the unofficial start of the Summer Solstice Parade & Pageant, an event produced by the Fremont Arts Council in the Fremont district of Seattle.

The event was started by streakers who crashed the parade. The first people to do so were a small group of friends and roommates from the adjacent (Wallingford) neighborhood, several of whom were bicycle couriers by trade. Participants now emphasize bodypainting and other artistry. The group is the largest and fastest growing ensemble associated with the parade. The parade, put on by Fremont Arts Council, is held on a Saturday close to the actual solstice.

Art bikes are common and cycles include BMX bikes, cycle rickshaws, unicycles, clown bicycles, tall bikes, lowrider bicycles, tandem bicycles and tricycles. People come from all over the country to ride. Full and partial (especially topfree) nudity is popular, but not mandatory.

While cyclists open the parade, they are not in the parade line-up (except in 2003 when they had a float). Parade rules say "any printed communications, written words, recognizable logos, signage, leaf-letting, or advertising in any form are prohibited on the parade route."

Recent events include a pre-ride bodypainting party, a party ride through the city, and the parade itself at noon.

== Controversy ==
2001 and subsequent years were controversial for the naked cyclists, including references to them as "parade crashers". In 2001, police and organizers posted laws against indecent exposure to warn of possible prosecution. Organizers claimed cyclists were getting in the way of the event's artistic freedom. An editorial that day (May 17, 2001) in The Seattle Times said: "They have stolen the spotlight on a parade that is supposed to be about art, not about being unclothed. Some Fremonters appear to resent that and do not want the nudists doing this. However, many welcome the cyclists. Neither of them want the cyclists wrestled to the pavement by police, spoiling the atmosphere of their parade."

== History and media coverage ==
=== 1993 ===
In 1993 7-10 people in the Solstice Parade cycled naked, maybe three of whom were bodypainted. Reference to the second year of naked cyclists: "It could only happen in Fremont", said one of the coordinators, Barbara Luecke. "Only such a rich artistic community could shake off the staid reserve from nearby Ballard to let loose with such creative energy and fun. ... Buck-naked cyclists who streaked the parade for the second year may have crossed the boundary of good taste (would that be Leary Way Northwest?). But one, at least, was wearing a helmet (proof that people in Seattle can get wild, but not too wild)."

=== 1995 ===
Eight naked men were reported to have cycled through the parade: "All the nudes: Overheard at the Fremont Solstice Parade on Saturday was a woman spectator commenting: "Oh, no. Not eight naked men on bicycles. I hate naked men on bicycles." A separate article a week before the parade referred to previous years with naked cyclists.

=== 1997 ===
A cyclist was reported to have hit a child, resulting in the Fremont Arts Council asking police to be present in 1998.

"Per tradition, there also were naked bicycle riders. They zoomed by so quickly it was hard to tell, um, the type of bike they were riding. 'I wish they had sort of stopped and waved,' said Blue Hesik Lan."

=== 1998 ===
One of the ride's organizers became involved in the ride for the first time, the only one bodypainted in a group of about six. Two 28-year-old naked cyclists were arrested because, according to police, they "cut into the marching order" of the parade. Four police were involved. The city did not file charges because, according to the prosecuting office: "in order to prove indecent exposure, it's necessary to show the person's intent was to be obscene and cause alarm." Also of note is the sightings of nude cyclists in the Capitol Hill neighborhood this year.

"Crowds booed when last year's naked riders were arrested and handcuffed."

"Bicyclists riding au naturel is nothing new to the quirky parade, which is known for participants in outlandish and sometimes risque costumes. But police say yesterday's arrests were made primarily for safety: The nude bicyclists typically dash quickly in and out of the parade audience."

"So, why is the only focus on the nude bikers? They were only a part of the parade for a few minutes. I did not see them."

=== 1999 ===
In the eighth year, a second-time rider hosted a bodypainting party at her Wallingford residence in response to SPD's actions of 1998 and friction between the Fremont Arts Council and Mark Sidran/City of Seattle. Twenty-odd friends gathered to get painted and ride together to the parade, including a woman who wore a 3-buttcheek bodysuit costume rather than paint. Members of the Fremont Arts Council launched a spoof of the naked bicyclists as well. Wearing flesh-colored bodysuits with exaggerated body parts sewn on, they cycled down the parade route while two bicyclists pretending to be police officers gave chase. When the truly naked cyclists showed up, they blended right in with their Fremont Arts Council bodysuit imposters.

"And, of course, there were the infamous and crowd-pleasing nude bikers, a regular attraction eagerly awaited by the parade watchers. ... 'This is not authorized by the organizers,' said Steve Lynch, one of the volunteers responsible for safety and order during the event. 'But it's just for fun, so no interventions.'"

"Here in the self-anointed center of the universe, where the Waiting for the Interurban sculptures wear more clothing than the nude cyclists who grace the annual Solstice Parade, high-tech is moving in."

"Meanwhile, Hadrann says the scent of rebellion is in the air in Fremont - or maybe it's just another rumor. 'Some people in the community are going to get nude if he (Sidran) starts arresting the cyclists,' he says. ... 'First, there was 50, now there's like 100 people. . . . Who knows what kind of chain reaction this is going to bring.'" This article also includes Seattle Police Department Lt. Mark Kuehn's suggestions for safety for nude cyclists such as: "Refrain from trying out saddles in the nude, for obvious sanitary reasons. Hadrann suggests shoppers take along a few pairs of Chinese disposable underwear (made of paper) for saddle-buying expeditions."

- "The council decided this week against posting 'no nudity' signs for the neighborhood's arts parade, where two men were arrested for naked bike riding last year. Police had asked that the signs be posted for this year's parade, set for Saturday. ...Council President Bradley Erhlich said the public nudity might be a form of artistic expression. ... 'If it is art, then the Arts Council should support them,' Erhlich said. ... Crowds booed when last year's naked riders were arrested and handcuffed."

=== 2001 ===
In 2001, according to The Seattle Times, there were 50 cyclists, mostly in bodypaint. To the amusement of many, this year an artist had a painting in the parade showing a naked female bicyclist next to a baton-wielding police officer. The pose itself could have either shown the apprehension or the cop gleefully stopping for a picture next to the bicyclist. The panel was put on a small platform on wheels and parade goers were invited to have their pictures taken with their heads poking out of the holes of the naked bicyclists and the officer.

In 2001, the city threatened to withdraw the event permit for the Fremont Arts Council because of the nudity. Signs were actually made warning naked cyclists that they may be subject to arrest. The city ended up backing off before the event day. Fremont Arts Council parade organizers urged riders to participate within the artistic spirit of the event. Many locals were very upset that the city would threaten to arrest one of the parade's most popular and creative ensembles. The blowback effect, as predicted by Seattle City Council Chair Nick Licata, ended up being more publicity and popularity for the cyclists which, in turn, led to more cyclists wanting to join the ensemble.

In efforts to combat this effect, the Seattle City Council was invited by the Fremont Arts Council to participate in the parade. Nick Licata was the only one who agreed and ended up cycling through as the "un-naked cyclist". After jeers of "Take your clothes off" he was met by a parade monitor who told him to get off the parade route, stating "Yeh? We still don't have bike riding in the parade. If one person rides then others will and then the whole parade will have bikes riding all over the place." Licata later lamented in a Seattle Times article, "I was waving to the photographer - smack in the middle of a pack of painted, naked bicyclists."

"There was no better illustration of the fair's quirkiness than in its parade - with its wild costumes, floats and giant puppets - and nude bicyclists, which led to a flap over the permit for this year's parade. ... Before the city issued this year's parade permit, police said they have gotten numerous complaints about the nude cyclists every year. They asked the Fremont Arts Council to post signs along the parade route warning cyclists, who are not a sanctioned part of the parade, about laws against indecent exposure. The council said no, even though members discouraged the nudity. ... In 1998, two bikers in the buff were arrested. None were arrested this year."

=== 2002 ===
"What solstice is complete without nude cyclists? To get your annual fix, see the Fremont Summer Solstice Parade and Fair on Saturday and Sunday."

"As has been the tradition, a number of unauthorized naked bicycle riders start the parade. Last year there were 50 — most in body paint."

=== 2003 ===
2003 marked the twelfth year of naked cyclists taking part in the Solstice Parade. The parade took place on June 21, 2003. Numbers quadrupled from previous years to between 75 and 80 riders. An internet discussion forum was established for the first time. The bodypainting party took place at the host's house in the Ravenna neighborhood, with a photo shoot at Cowen Park. The procession then began south through the University District on Roosevelt and then on 45th through Wallingford to Phinney Ridge. This is also the first year that the cyclists were officially part of the parade with their Helios-themed float, which several cyclists (partially dressed) climbed aboard after they cycled through the parade. The float featured wispy clouds and gold-painted "chariot" exercise bikes to evoke a sense of pulling the sun through the summer. Ironically, toward the end of the parade, and despite all the "Happy Solstice" chants, the sky clouded over and it began to rain. Two digital video films were produced from footage of this year's event. One is called Naked & Painted: The Fremont Solstice Riders 2003 and is sold to friends and future potential riders with proceeds going to a local charity. The other video was called Solstice: A Celebration of the Art of Bodypainting produced by James W. Taylor/Circle Rock Productions and premiered at Naked Freedom Film Festival , held at the Seattle Art Museum on May 15, 2004. Unusually cool weather this year resulting in a number of weather-themed paint jobs.

Also in 2003, much publicity was focused on David Zaitzeff's determination to walk naked through the Solstice Parade. Zaitzeff sued Seattle police Chief Gil Kerlikowske in a federal lawsuit because he "desires to go nude at the Fremont Solstice Parade without fear of unjust arrest". U.S. District Judge Robert Lasnik said that because Zaitzeff had not been arrested for indecent exposure, the court couldn't make a prospective ruling on the matter.

=== 2005 ===
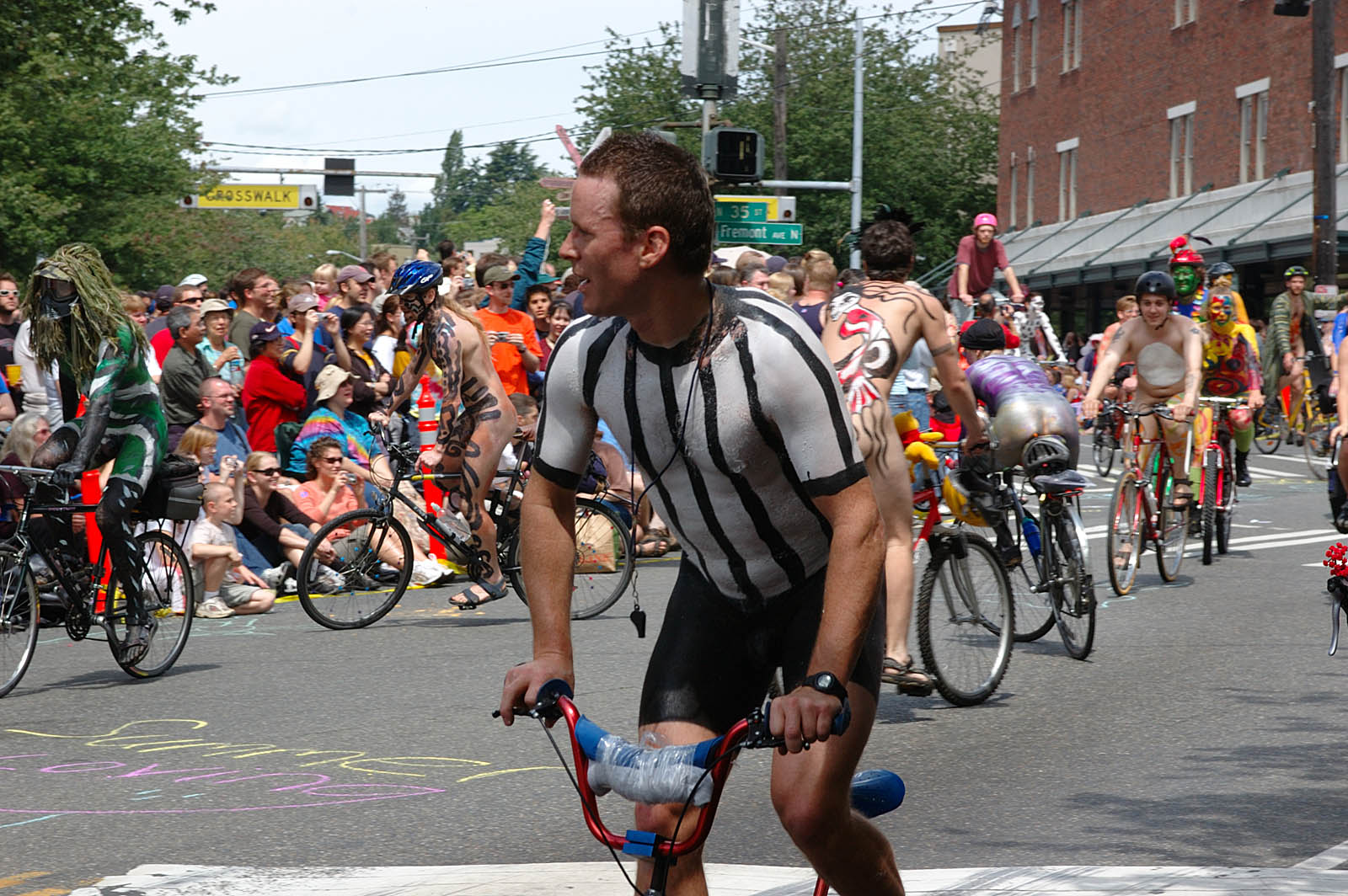
The Synchronised Cycling Drill Team shown performing.

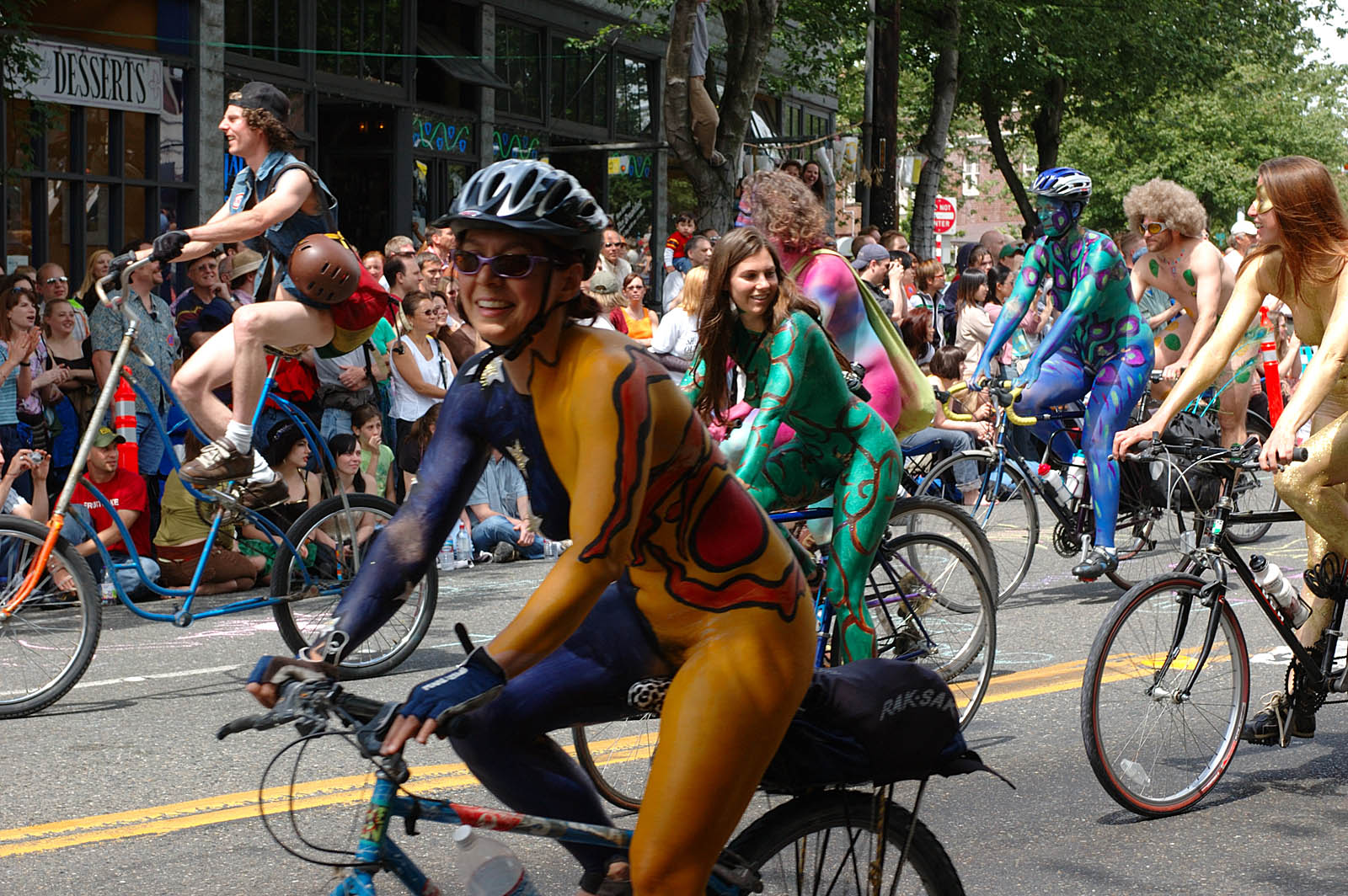

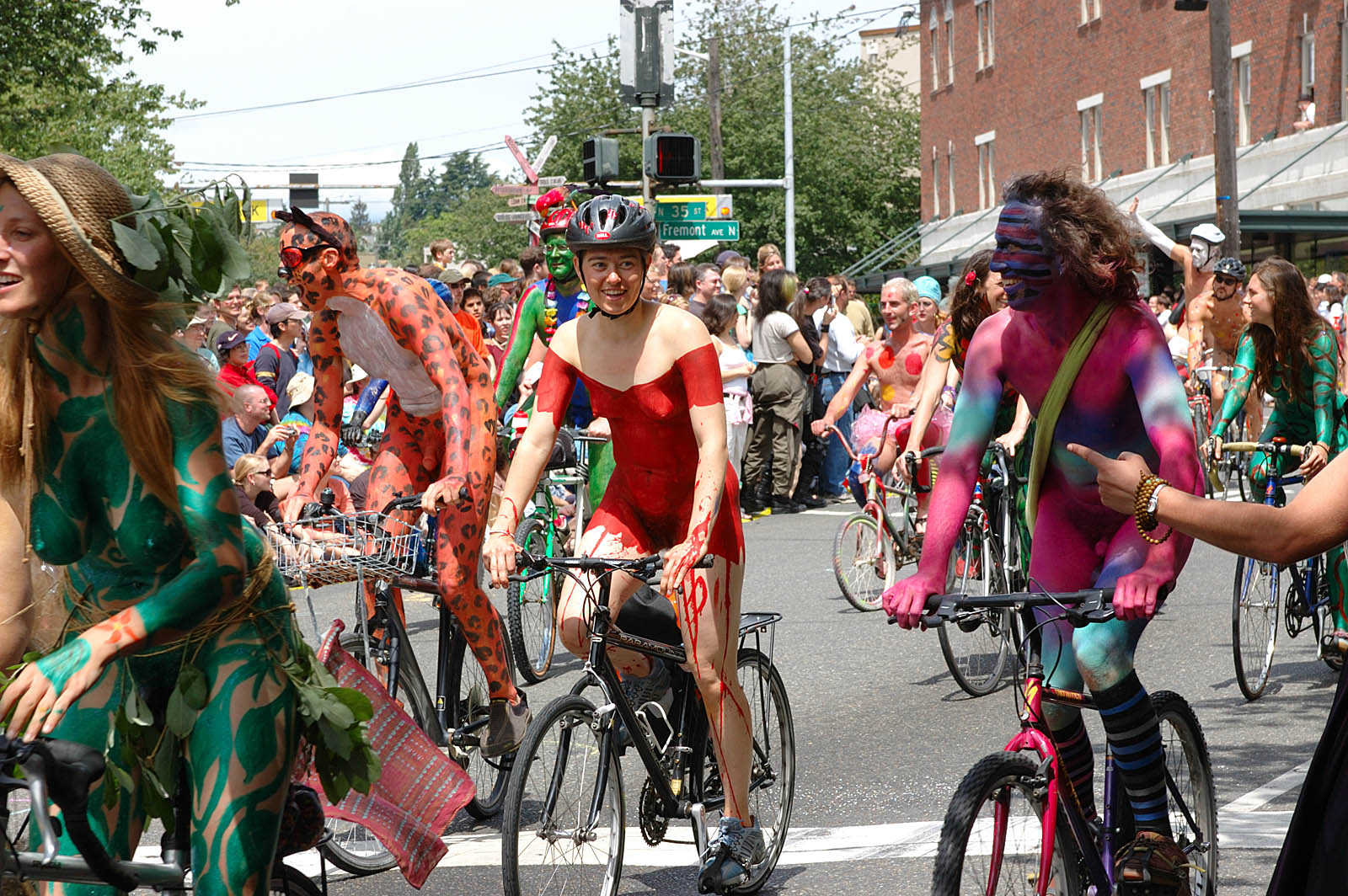

The parade took place on June 18, 2005. Approximately 138 cyclists leave bodypainting party on the south side of the Lake Washington Ship Canal, and once joined by those waiting at the parade, the numbers probably grew to around 160 cyclists. Part of the ride included going down the Ballard Bridge on 15th Avenue and turning again on NW Market Street. About five cyclists broke off from the group after the end of the parade ride and rode around Green Lake and came back to Fremont.

One of the big controversies in 2005 was the Fremont Arts Council excluding People Undergoing Real Experiences (PURE) (now known as Pure cirkus) from dressing "up as pirates with two people suspended on a pirate ship float from hooks in their skin" as they go through the parade. Much of the media noted that while the naked cyclists are tolerated and widely popular, this has become the new controversial area for the council.

A week later, a third painted ride, called the Body Pride Ride, was started by one of the painted cyclists, and took place for the first time in the Seattle Gay Pride Parade on Capitol Hill. A WNBR mini-ride in September marked 2005 as a record-setting year not only for the number of painted cyclists participating, but also for doubling the number of painted naked rides in Seattle to a total of four.

"If bike riders rode nude in a Los Angeles summer solstice celebration, the LAPD would shoot them dead, after a 'slow speed' chase televised on all 28 local channels."

"Really, that's just the crazy naked bicyclists who precede the parade every year. They get all the press, all the hype, all the lasting impressions. People who work on the parade openly despise them. ... The nude bikers take away from all the legitimate art that volunteers spend countless hours creating. With one exhibitional blow, months of hard work by solstice parade artists is knocked from our collective conscious."

=== 2009 ===
The 21st Annual Solstice Parade took place on June 20, 2009, marking the 18th consecutive year of the painted cyclists. The painting party took place at Hale's Ales in Ballard, and attracted an estimated 430 cyclists, plus painters. After riding through Ballard and watching their numbers swell as riders from independent paint parties joined the group, the riders traversed the parade route in Fremont, ending once again at Gas Works Park. Media coverage included an article and video by the Seattle P-I. Ensembles included the "Stimulus Package" group, appropriate for a year of controversial economic bailouts. This year was also the first year of the Gardens Everywhere Bike Parade.

=== 2010 ===
The 22nd Annual Solstice Parade took place on Saturday, June 19, 2010, marking the nineteenth consecutive year of the painted (and some not-so-painted) solstice cyclists. The painting party again took place at Hale's Ales in Ballard, and attracted hundreds of cyclists, plus painters. Then they jumped on their bikes and headed to Ballard for a warm-up ride in the relatively chilly mid-50s air, surprising unsuspecting drivers and whooping it up down Market Street before returning for the noon start of the parade, where the riders completed the parade route in Fremont. An optional repeat loop-back plan through part of the route was added in 2010, designed to extend the experience for both the riders who opted for it as well as the crowd lining the streets, with a side benefit of minimizing any time gap between the end of the cyclists and the start of the parade proper. That plan met with some confusion due to communication issues with parade officials, and therefore mixed results, but riders vowed to remedy that in 2011. The cyclists ended at the now-traditional clothing-optional "victory celebration" at and around Kite Hill in Gas Works Park.

=== 2011 ===
The parade took place on June 18, the day before Fathers Day. The skies were overcast and the temperature was in the mid-50s with intermittent misty light rain—for the second year in a row, the third Saturday in June was unseasonably cool. But that did not deter the 600+ riders nor curb their enthusiasm. For many, the day started at the old Ballard Library building, which had been rented as the central location for body painting. Earlier in the week, plastic had been laid on the floor and taped into one big surface, then tables set out to delineate separate painting areas. Aisles were painted on the floor in orange with "Keep Clear" to keep the fire marshal happy and facilitate movement around the area; bumping into someone covered in paint leaves a mark. In the northwest corner was the film crew for Beyond Naked, a documentary about four first time riders.

=== 2015 ===
A small group of longtime organizers once again hosted a mass paint party in the Silshole neighborhood. The organizers took a video of the painted cyclists heading out through the gate and counted well over 945 cyclists just at this paint party. En route to the parade starting point they were joined by hundreds of other painted cyclists who swelled the ranks at each passing intersection . The artistry displayed on naked riders' bodies has become more and more intricate each year with some riders bringing their own personal painters to the party. Donations were collected at the entrance and after all expenses were paid the paint party volunteers donated $4,500 to the Fremont Art Council in order to help pay the parade expenses.

=== 2020 and 2021 ===
There was no parade either year due to COVID-19, but a small group of cyclists met up at Gasworks Park and rode through the city.

The parade and bike contingent restarted in 2022.

== See also ==
- Arts in Seattle
- Body painting
- Bohemianism and Counterculture
- Clothing-optional bike rides
- Critical Mass
- New media art
- Performance art
- Public nudity
- Social nudity in Seattle
- World Naked Bike Ride
