= Clothing-optional bike ride =

Bicycling event where cyclists may be nude

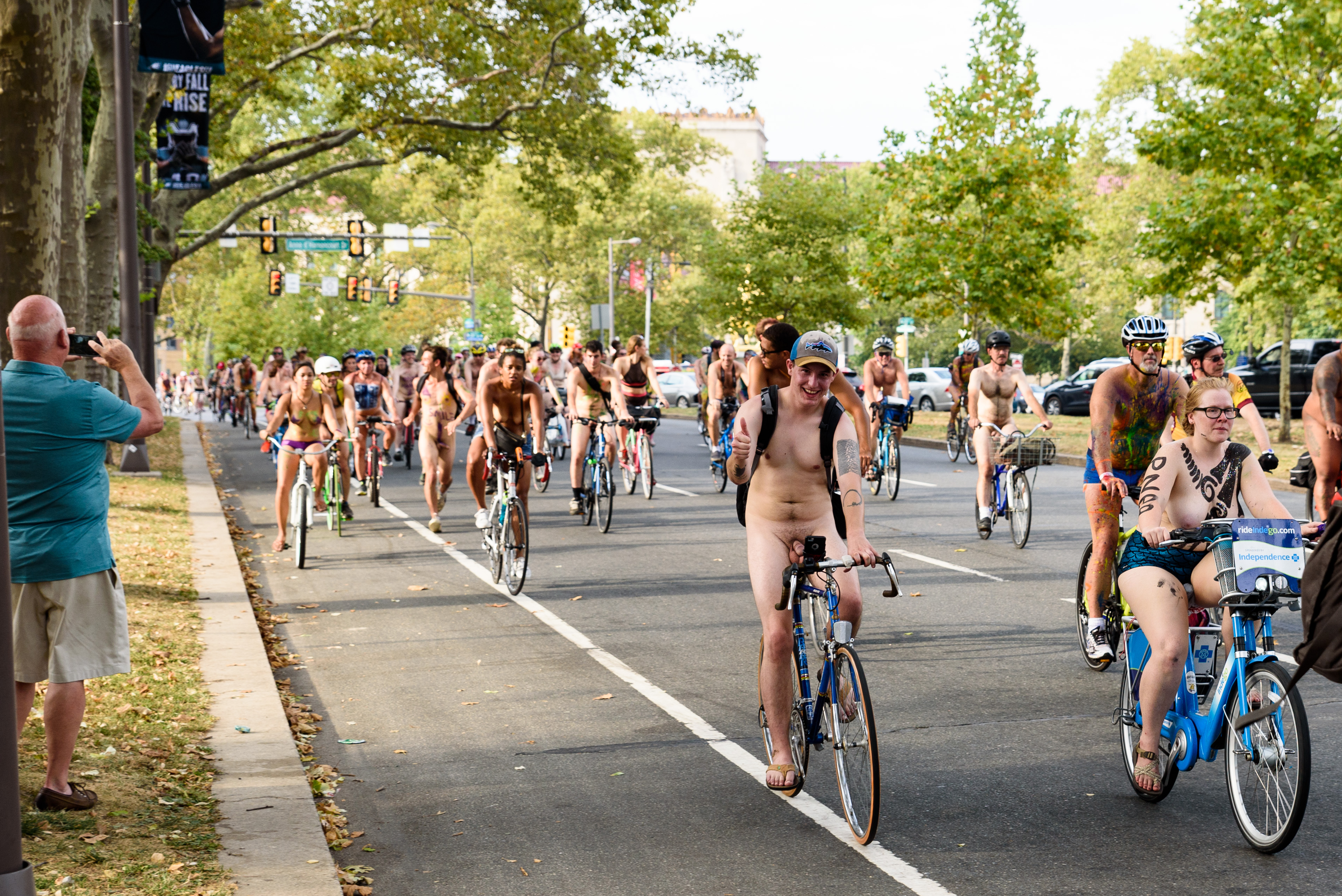
- Participants in the World Naked Bike Ride in Philadelphia, one of the largest and most famous internationally. Other non-motorized riders including skateboarders and unicyclists, as well as runners, are also welcome to participate.

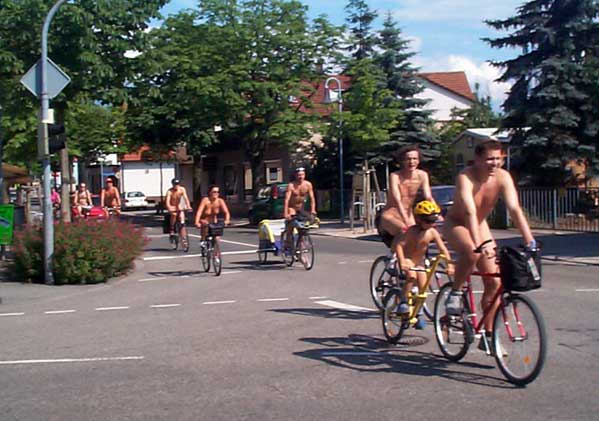
FKK-Radtour 2001 in Karlsruhe, Germany

A clothing-optional bike ride is a cycling event in which nudity is permitted or expected. There are many clothing-optional cycling events around the world. Rides may be political, recreational, artistic, or a unique combination thereof. Some are used to promote topfreedom, a social movement to accord women and girls the right to be topless in public where men and boys have that right.

Body art including body painting is a common form of creative expression, as well as costumes, art bikes, portable sound reinforcement systems (such as public address systems/bullhorns, and boomboxes), musical instruments as well as other types of noisemakers.

Many of the political rides have their roots in Critical Mass and are often described or categorized as a form of political protest, street theatre, party-on-wheels, streaking, public nudity, and clothing-optional recreation and thus attract a wide range of participants.

== Events ==
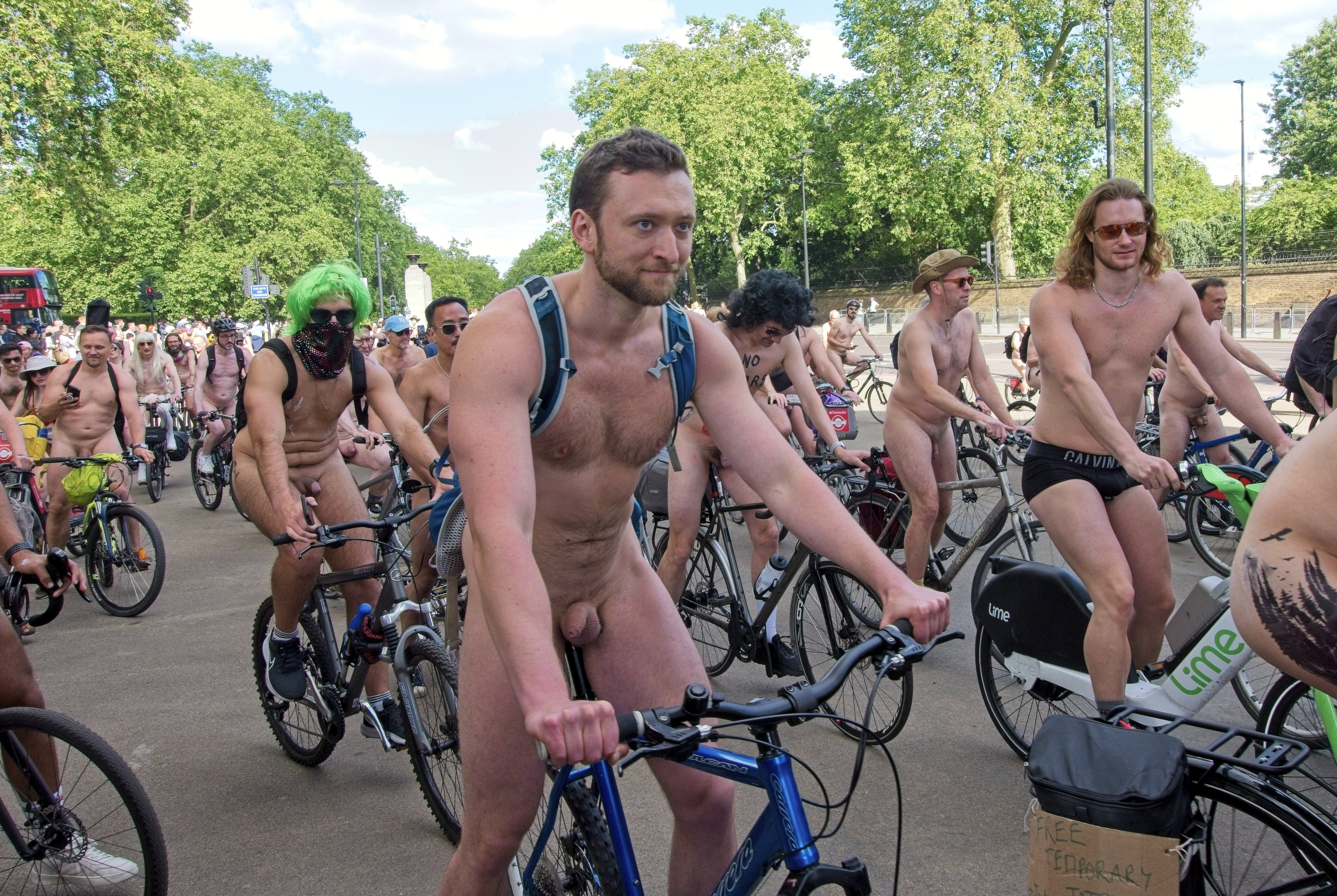
Participants in the World Naked Bike Ride London 2024 cycle on The Mall

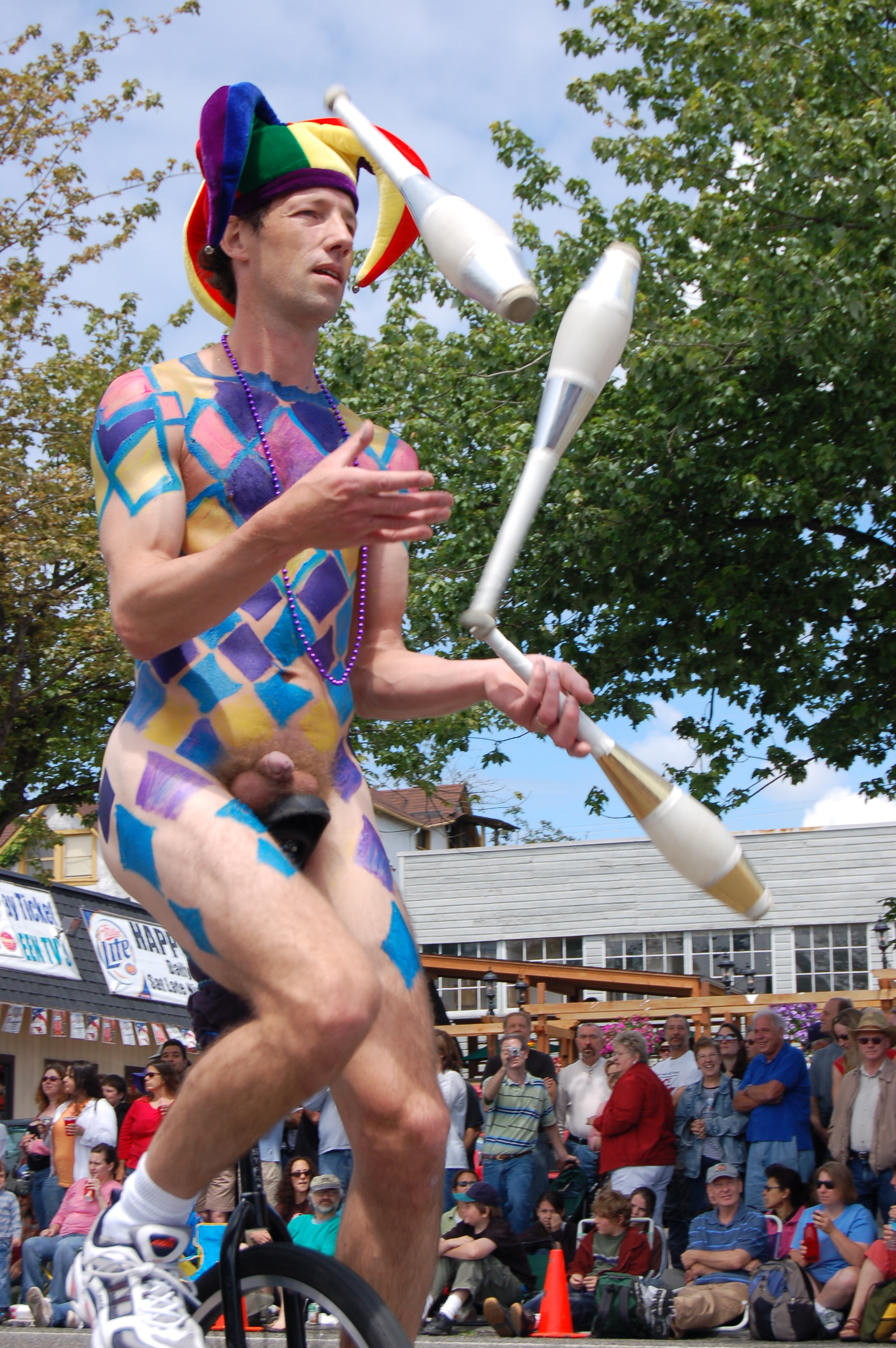
A body-painted unicyclist in the 2006 Summer Solstice Parade and Pageant

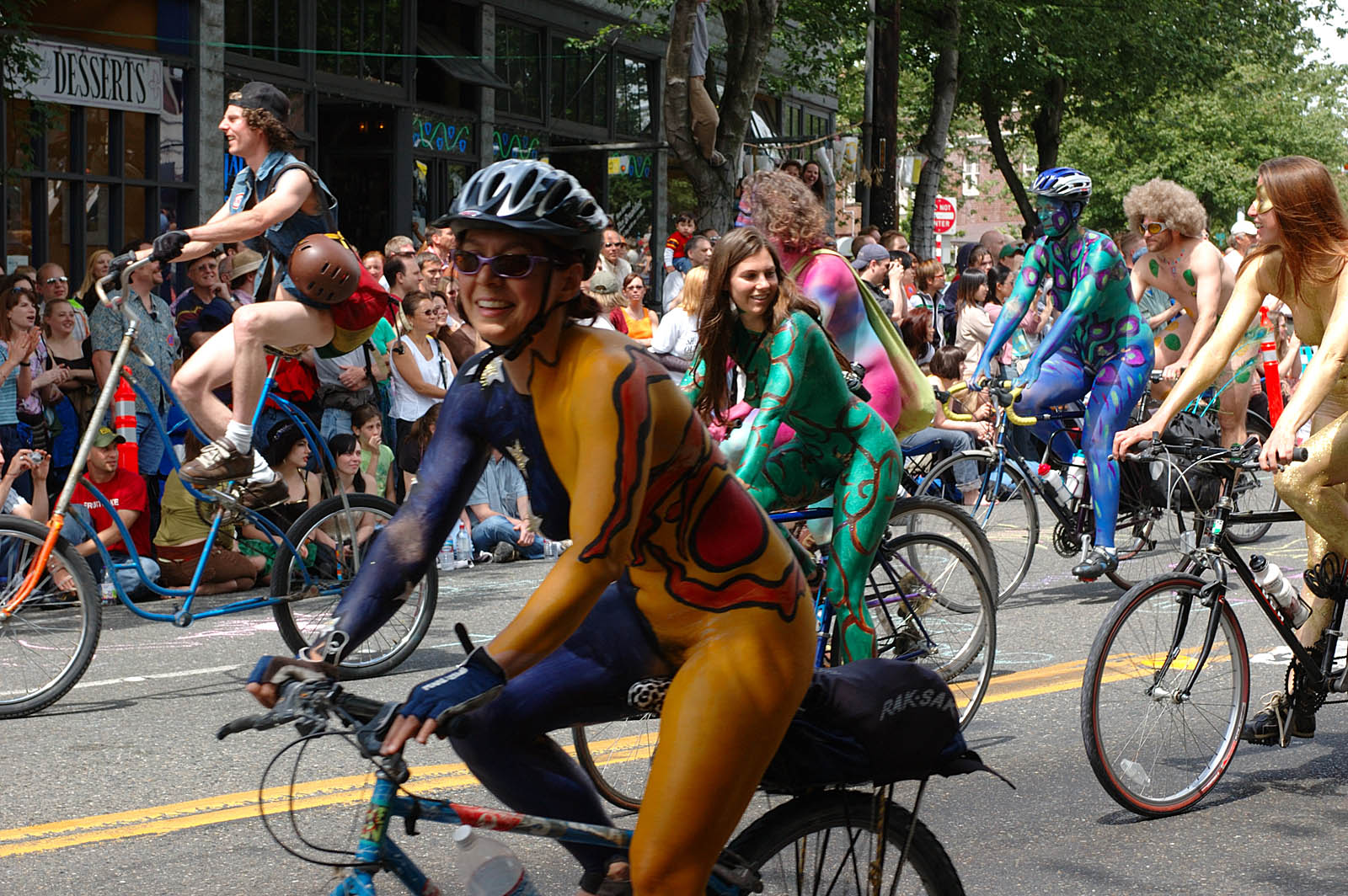
2005 Solstice Cyclists in Seattle

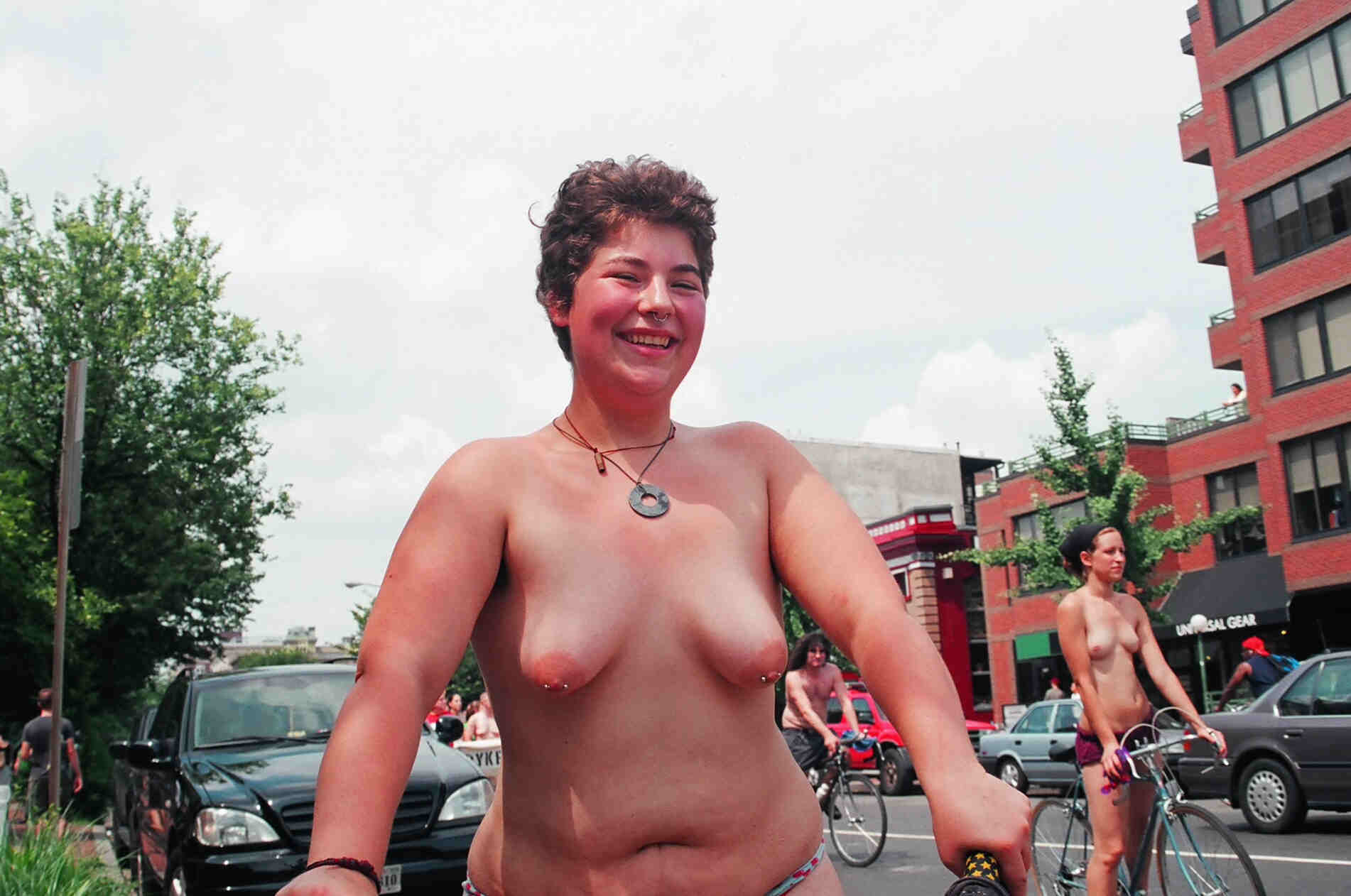
Topfree participants in the Washington, D.C. Dyke March in 2005

Full and partial (especially topfree) nudity is encouraged, but not mandatory, on all rides. Some people ride in their underwear.

=== Political and often artistic rides ===
- Critical Ass, a variant of the Critical Mass bike ride, where participating bicyclists ride in their underwear or in the nude. In June 2004, 22 world cities participated in World Naked Bike Ride, an international Critical Ass-style event. Regular Critical Ass rides have taken place in New York City, Chicago, Seattle and other locales throughout North America.
- Hemp Ride, starting in 2007
- World Naked Bike Ride, an international event (Since 12 June 2004)
- Manifestación Ciclonudista Mundial in Spain (Since 2001)
- Body Pride Ride in Seattle (Since 2005)
- Critical Mass Ciclonudista in Italy

=== Recreational rides, not overtly political ===
- Nackt Radtour, nude cycling tours in Germany (since 2000)
- The Naked Bike Ride at the University of Vermont, a bi-annual event held at midnight after the last day of classes each semester

=== Mostly artistic, non-political rides ===
- Solstice Cyclists in Seattle (Since 1992, with bodypainting since 1998?)
- Critical Tits at Burning Man in the Black Rock Desert in Nevada
- The music video made for the Queen song "Bicycle Race"

=== Topfree events ===
Events where topfreedom is allowed but full nudity is either not allowed or discouraged:

- Sydney Body Art Ride in Sydney, Australia (Since 2005)
- Washington, D.C. Dyke March

== Activists ==
Known activists include Daniel Lorenz Johnson, Jennifer Moss, Simon Oosterman, Conrad Schmidt (WNBR founder), and Terri Sue Webb.

== Filmography ==
- Solstice: A Celebration of the Art of Bodypainting produced by James W. Taylor/Circle Rock, 2004. Includes clips of the 2003 Solstice Cyclists
- Radtour-Classics 2001: Nackt-Radtour in und um Karlsruhe am 14. 6. 2001 A film by Karl-Heinz Kreutler.

== See also ==
- Outline of cycling
- List of public outdoor clothes free places
- Naked hiking
- Nude beach
- Nudity in sport
- Public nudity
- Utility cycling
