= Nackt Radtour =

Nude cycling events in Germany

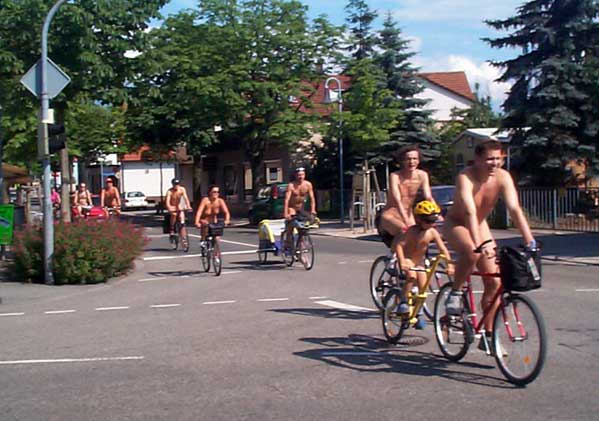
FKK-Radtour 2001 on June 14, 2001 in Karlsruhe

Nackt-Radtour, Karlsruher FKK Rad-Classics and Karlsruher Nacktradeltour are references used to describe annual naked cycling tours in Germany, many of which happen around Karlsruhe. Organizers describe the event as recreational rather than political. Full and partial (especially topfree) nudity is encouraged, but not mandatory, on all rides. The rides are believed to be some of the first naked bike rides organized in the world. The rides are organized by a number of groups and individuals, such as "No Limit Nudism", the action group "Wald FKK", "Free Range Nudism" or FKK-Freun.de. The events are organized via various internet portals. The events have been held annually since 2000, and generally take place in June or July.

== See also ==
- Clothing-optional bike rides
- Nudity in sport
- List of public outdoor clothes free places
