= Day of Private Reflection =

Day of remembrance in Northern Ireland

The Day of Private Reflection is a day of remembrance created to acknowledge and reflect upon the conflict in Northern Ireland. It was proposed by Healing Through Remembering, a cross-community organisation devoted to dealing with the legacy of the conflict. The occasion sought to look toward a peaceful future, while reflecting on the violence of the past.

The day has been held annually since 2007 on 21 June, the summer solstice; it was chosen for this date as the solstice was deemed an opportunity for looking both forward and back.

The Day of Reflection was specifically mentioned by the report of the Consultative Group on the Past who recommended that it be renamed the Day of Reflection and Reconciliation.

== Background ==
A Day of Reflection was one of the six recommendations contained in the report published by the Healing Through Remembering Project in 2002. The report recommended that an annual Day of Reflection be established which would ‘initially be a day for private individual reflection’, with the purpose of the day developing over the years ‘moving from personal and organisational reflection to becoming more collective, public and shared among communities, groups, churches and organisations'; it was described as an attempt to revive the well-established practices of commemoration, which tended to focus on death and loss, with a new sense of purpose and openness to the prospects for peace and regeneration.

In 2004 a sub group of people of diverse backgrounds was established within the Healing Through Remembering initiative to explore ways of taking forward the original recommendation. Initially the sub group commissioned and conducted research to inform their work including research looking at days of reflection in an international context, research exploring potential dates on which a Day of Reflection might take place locally and a scoping study to assess local views on the idea and practical steps which could be taken to make a Day of Reflection a reality.

In May 2006 the sub group met to consider the results of the research and the scoping study and to form a strategy for its ongoing work. As part of the Sub Group strategy it was agreed to initiate the holding of a ‘private Day of Reflection’ on 21 June 2007, as a first stage to stimulating debate and continuing exploration of the viability of the original HTR recommendation. In light of the response to the Day of Private Reflection 2007, the Sub Group organised a further Day of Private Reflection on 21 June 2008. Other organisations have since gone on to mark the day annually in their own way.

== See also ==
- The Troubles
- Northern Ireland peace process
- Consultative Group on the Past
