= Santa Barbara Summer Solstice Parade =

Annual arts parade in Santa Barbara, California

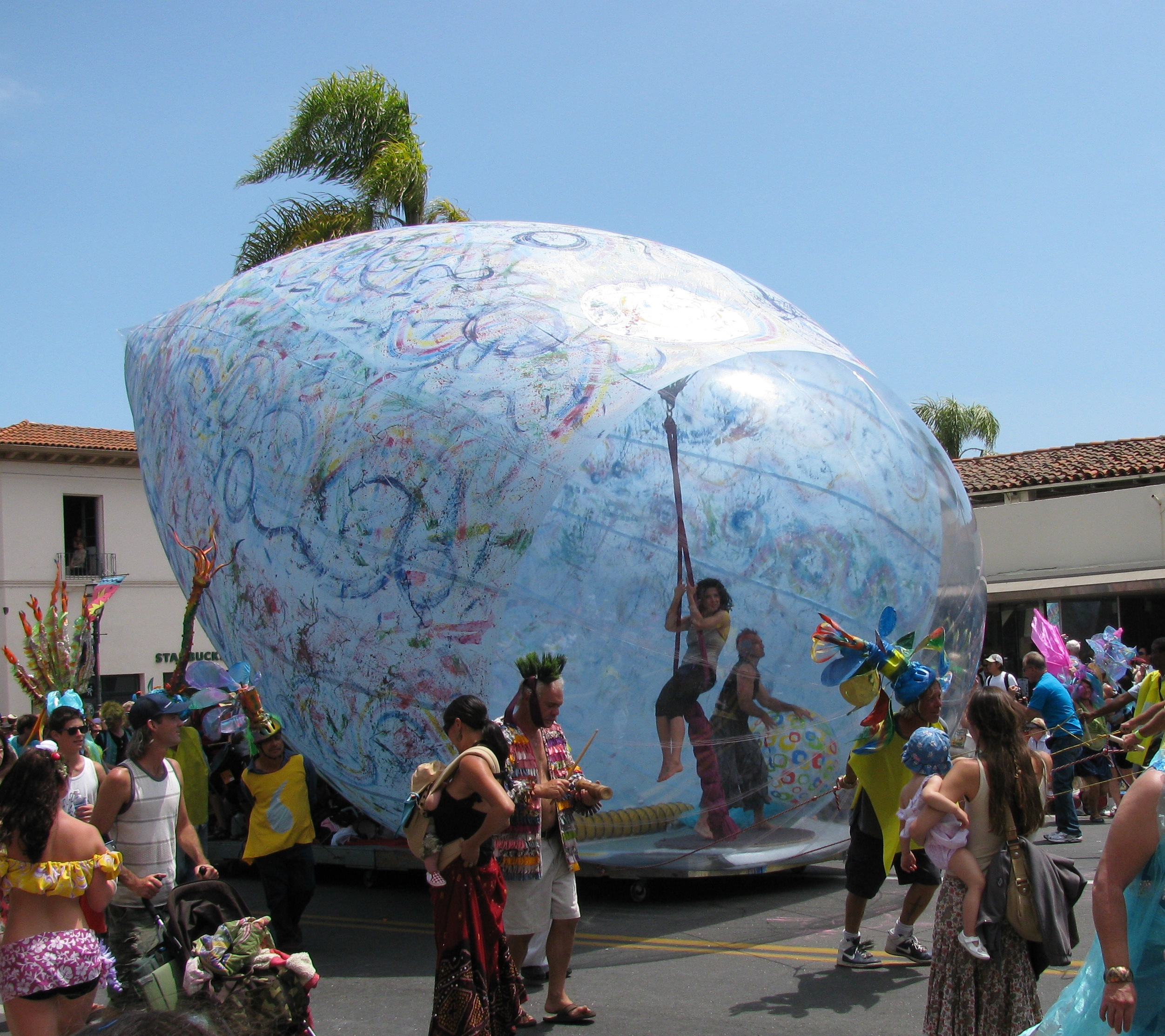
- A float in the 2009 parade
- Status: Active
- Genre: Parade, arts festival
- Frequency: Annual, on the Saturday nearest the summer solstice
- Locations: Santa Barbara, California, United States
- Coordinates: 34°25′43″N 119°42′18″W
- Years active: 1974–present
- Founded: 1974
- Founder: Michael Gonzales
- Attendance: 100,000+ (estimated)
- Organizer: Summer Solstice Celebration, Inc.
- Website: www.solsticeparade.com

The Santa Barbara Summer Solstice Parade is an annual community arts parade in Santa Barbara, California, held on the Saturday closest to the summer solstice. Artist and mime Michael Gonzales started it in 1974 as a costumed birthday walk with a few friends. It grew into a three-day Summer Solstice Celebration, made up of a free festival in Alameda Park, a public float-building workshop and a parade of hundreds of costumed performers, dancers and handmade floats. The parade bans motorized vehicles, live animals, written words, signs and logos. Crowds of 100,000 or more come yearly to make the event one of the largest one-day events in Santa Barbara County. The parade was held on State Street until 2019. After the COVID-19 pandemic it moved to Santa Barbara Street, because the central blocks of State Street had become a pedestrian promenade.

== History ==
=== Origins ===
In 1974 Michael Gonzales, a Santa Barbara artist and mime, gathered a few street-performer friends to walk in costume up State Street to celebrate his birthday. His name is also spelled Gonzalez in some sources. Accounts differ on the date of the first walk. Some place it on the longest day of the year. Others say it marked his May Day birthday, and that the event later moved to June to join a solstice music festival.

Gonzales set the rules that still define the parade. A profile of the celebration's leaders quotes his first parade permit: "No words, no signs, no symbols". As a mime, he had no trouble with that rule. The Santa Barbara Historical Museum's records list the founding rules as no motorized vehicles, no live animals, no signs and no logos.

=== Growth ===
In 1978 organizers began a community workshop where artists help the public design and build floats and costumes in the weeks before the parade. Since 2009 the workshop has been held at the Community Arts Workshop at 631 Garden Street. Over the years the celebration added a free three-day festival in Alameda Park, where the parade ends. The State Street route ran from Cota Street to Micheltorena Street, finishing at Alameda Park.

=== Organization and funding ===
The celebration is produced by Summer Solstice Celebration, Inc., a nonprofit that promotes hands-on community participation in the arts. In 2018 executive director Robin Elander, put the annual budget at about $258,000. The City of Santa Barbara contributed $68,000, usually paid after the event in August. That year the group launched a crowdfunding campaign to cover a funding gap. At one point the city's Arts Commission withheld a $15,000 competitive grant the parade had received for about 25 years. The commission argued that the money duplicated a separate $45,000 line-item grant from the city. In February 2025 the organization eliminated participation fees for parade entries and festival activities to keep the event free for everyone.

=== Pandemic and move to Santa Barbara Street ===
Because of the COVID-19 pandemic, the 2020 and 2021 parades were cancelled. The celebration held a virtual workshop and festival instead, and a virtual parade was broadcast on June 20, 2020.

By the time the parade returned in June 2022, the downtown blocks of State Street had been closed to cars and filled with outdoor dining structures as the State Street Promenade. The parade moved one block east to Santa Barbara Street, closing nine blocks from Cota Street to Micheltorena Street. Later parades used a route on Santa Barbara Street from Ortega Street to Sola Street, ending at the festival in Alameda Park. In 2026 the City Council discussed returning the parade to State Street as it voted on the future of the Promenade.

== Parade rules and character ==
The parade's rules stem from Gonzales's original permit and aim to keep it a non-commercial work of public art, consisting of three main principals:

1. No motorized vehicles: floats must be moved by people.
2. No live animals.
3. No written words, signs, symbols or logos: there are no banners, no advertising and no political slogans of any kind allowed.

Entries range from solo costumed walkers to floats built at the workshop and dance troupes of more than a hundred members.

== See also ==
- Fremont Solstice Parade, a similar parade in Seattle
- Old Spanish Days Fiesta
- State Street (Santa Barbara)
