= Healing Through Remembering =

Healing Through Remembering (HTR) is an extensive cross-community project in Northern Ireland, made up of a diverse range of individual members with different political perspectives and social experiences.

HTR aims at comprehensive involvement of all stakeholders to investigate the feasibility, viability and usefulness of remembering the Troubles and in so doing both individually and collectively contribute to building a better future for all. Through ongoing internal discussions, research, round table discussions, conferences and outreach programmes, HTR has produced a range of reports, options papers, discussion papers and audits which continue to inform discussion throughout society – this includes community groups, political parties, statutory and Government policy makers.

The object of Healing Through Remembering is to promote, for the benefit of the public in Northern Ireland, the advancement of education in the purpose and methods of mediation, conciliation and reconciliation of disputes or conflicts and of all the means of managing them for peaceful resolution in the interests of good citizenship and community relations and in particular to promote research and the exchange of views that help towards education into the causes, prevention and alleviation of destructive patterns of behaviour and into peaceful means of resolving conflict.

Members come from across Northern Ireland, Great Britain and the Republic of Ireland and have been meeting over the past number of years to focus on the issue of how to deal with the past relating to the conflict in and about Northern Ireland.

== History ==
In March 2000 the All Truth is Bitter Report was launched. It documented the visit of Dr. Alex Boraine to Northern Ireland in February 1999 and recommended wide-ranging discussion to explore and debate ways of examining the past and processes of remembering so as to build a better future.

A number of individuals were invited by the authors of All Truth is Bitter to form a Board. After much discussion, in June 2001 a diverse group of individuals agreed to become the Healing Through Remembering Project Board and carry forward the work of the project.

== Public consultation ==
HTR carried out an extensive consultation in 2002 which asked individuals, organisations and communities "How should people remember the events connected with the conflict in and about Northern Ireland and in so doing, individually and collectively contribute to the healing of the wounds of society?

== Healing Through Remembering Report 2002 ==
In June 2002 HTR published the findings of the consultation in the form of the Healing Through Remembering Report. This report made six recommendations:

- a collective storytelling and archiving process,
- a day of reflection,
- a network of commemoration and remembering projects,
- a living memorial museum,
- acknowledgement leading to the possibility of truth recovery and
- a Healing Through Remembering Initiative.

== Healing Through Remembering Initiative ==
The organisation has established five Sub Groups to engage in dialogue and discussion and carry out research to fully examine the recommendations of the 2002 Report.

== Storytelling Sub Group ==
The Storytelling group considers how a collective oral narrative might work as vehicle for dealing with the past.

The group is developing the parameters for research into the impact of Storytelling. The Storytelling Sub Group has carried out and published an audit of storytelling initiatives related to the conflict, hosted a one-day conference on the theme of "Storytelling as the Vehicle?" and published a report of the conference.

The Sub Group is currently working on producing a Good Practice Guide to Storytelling incorporating the values, definitions and core principles of storytelling.

== Day of Reflection Sub Group ==
The Day of Reflection group considers how best the conflict can be collectively remembered and reflected upon.

The first Day of Private Reflection took place on Thursday 21 June 2007. The purpose of the day is to "Provide an opportunity for people to remember the events of the past in a non-confrontational, dignified and respectful manner." Healing Through Remembering and its Day of Reflection Sub Group took time to carefully consider and plan the day to bring it to fruition. A free-phone telephone support line was made available before, during and after the day. The Day of Private Reflection was launched in March 2007 and received considerable media interest and attention. Interest and support for the Day of Private Reflection came from all sections of the community. There was widespread support in favour of a second Day of Private Reflection, with Healing Through Remembering as the lead organisation. A full and independent evaluation of the day was commissioned and is scheduled for publication in March 2008. The sub-group also held a residential which took place in September 2007.

A full range of materials to help raise awareness of the Day of Private Reflection and aid reflection on the Day have been produced and are available to order free of charge from HTR or via www.dayofreflection.com

Groups and individuals are also encouraged to develop their own materials and resources. The Day of Reflection Sub Group carried out extensive research on international experiences of days of remembrance before proceeding with plans for an initial Day of Private Reflection on 21 June 2007.

== Living Memorial Museum Sub Group ==
The Living Memorial Museum group considers what form a living memorial and museum might take.

The form of the Living Memorial Museum is still under discussion. The Living Memorial Museum Sub Group has commissioned an extensive audit of artefacts relating to the conflict which are held in existing archives and personal collections.

Dr. Kris Brown is conducting the audit which is being carried out through a joint Fellowship post at QUB.

The group has also conducted an Open Call for Ideas on what form a Living Memorial Museum to the conflict could take. A wide range of submissions were received and plans are underway for displaying them and generating further ideas.

== Commemoration Sub Group ==
The Commemoration Sub Group is currently examining the issues relating to commemoration and commissioned research on the subject to inform their thinking on possible ways forward.

The research considered: what is commemoration and what is its role in societies emerging from conflict?

A roundtable event on similar issues was held in January 2007. The Sub Group is currently finalising its strategic plan and considering future directions for the group.

== Truth Recovery & Acknowledgement Sub Group ==
The Network of Commemoration group examines the role of commemoration post conflict.

The Sub Group is continuing to host partnership events with interested organisations and groups on both the report and the issue of truth recovery. The Truth Recovery and Acknowledgement Sub Group has undertaken two large pieces of work to date. The first, a scoping study on the current positions of key organisations, institutions and parties relating to acknowledgement of their role in the conflict was used to inform a discussion paper and proposal on what form acknowledgement might take. The paper, Acknowledgement and its Role in Preventing Future Violence, was published in October 2006.

The second piece of research developed by the group was a document on possible options for truth recovery. The document, Making Peace with the Past: Options for truth recovery regarding the conflict in and about Northern Ireland, was launched on 31 October 2006. Since the publication of the report the Sub Group has hosted a series of open meetings on the issue of truth recovery across Northern Ireland, Great Britain and the Republic of Ireland. These open meetings concluded at the end of April.

== Consultants Database ==
Details of any research being commissioned by Healing Through Remembering on behalf of the Sub Groups is circulated to all researchers and facilitators who are listed on the Healing Through Remembering Consultants Database.

== Membership ==
Members of Healing Through Remembering are kept informed of the work of the organisation, are invited to participate in seminars, talks and other events and have voting rights at the AGM.

Reports Copies of reports produced and published by Healing Through Remembering are available to download from the HTR website: www.healingthroughremembering.org

Alternatively hard copies can be ordered free of charge from the HTR Office.

board of directors 2012/2013 The Board of Healing Through Remembering is elected annually by the members of the organisation at the AGM.

The members of the current Board are:

Dawn Purvis MLA(Honorary Treasurer)

Oliver Wilkinson (Honorary Secretary)

Claire Hackett (Honorary Treasurer)

Brandon Hamber(Chair Storytelling)

Irwin Turbitt (Chair Day of Reflection)

Alan McBride (Chair Living Memorial Museum)

Alan Wardle (Chair Truth Recovery & Acknowledgement)

Geraldine Smyth (Chair Commemoration)

Pat Sheehan (Co-Optee)

Brian Lamkin (Co-Optee)

== HTR Staff ==
Kate Turner – Project Director

James Grant – Finance Officer

Eimear McVeigh – Administrative Assistant

Jayme Reaves – Project Coordinator

The Healing Through Remembering Initiative is a limited company with charitable status and has been in operation since October 2003. The organisation operates through independent funding which has been sourced internationally.

== See also ==
- The Troubles
- Northern Ireland peace process
- Consultative Group on the Past
