= Dekochari =

Form of art bike indigenous to Japan

A dekochari in Japan, 2014

The Dekochari or decoration charinko (デコチャリ or デコレーション・チャリンコ, dekochari or dekorēshon charinko) is a form of art bike indigenous to Japan dating back to the mid-1970s. "Deko" in Japanese is short for "decoration" and "chari" is slang for "bike". The dekochari was a response by children to the Dekotora ("tora" is short for "truck") craze which swept Japan after a series of movies called Truck Yaro was released. These movies featured giant trucks decked out in chrome and flashy lights.

Unable to drive the chrome-plated flashing trucks, children instead built plywood boxes around their bikes and attached chrome plating and lights. Almost all current Dekocharis have elaborate light displays and many include hi-fi audio systems and cup-holders.

There are currently several dekochari bike gangs in Japan, including the All Japan Hishyomaru fleet, the All Japan DC Club Ryumaki and the All Japan Kyokugenmaru Gang.

== See also ==
- Outline of cycling
- Art bike
- Decotora trucks
- Itasha cars
