= Summer solstice =

Astronomical phenomenon time

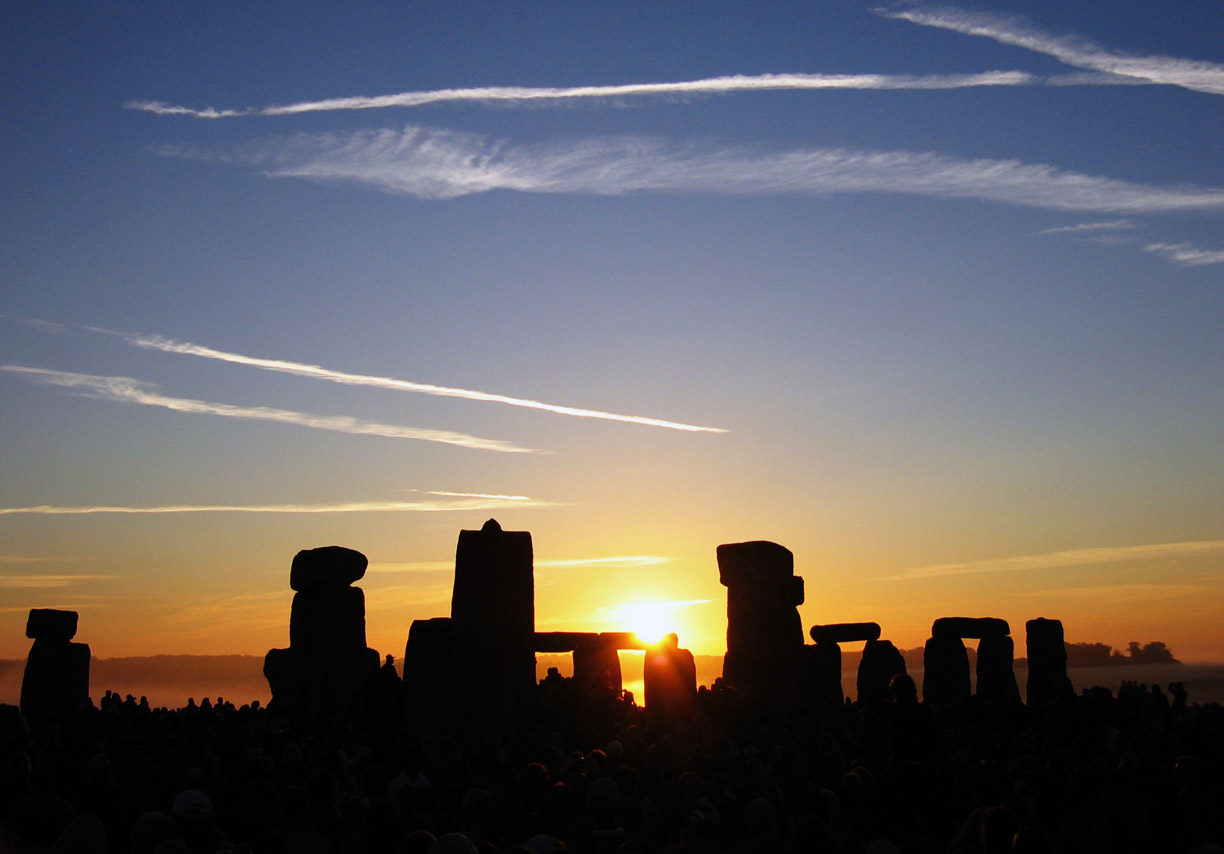
- Sunrise at Stonehenge in England during the summer solstice in the Northern Hemisphere
- Also called: Midsummer; the Longest Day; the Shortest Night; Estival solstice
- Observed by: Various cultures
- Type: Cultural, astronomical
- Significance: Beginning of lengthening nights and shortening days
- Date: June 20 or June 21 (Northern Hemisphere) and December 21 or December 22 (Southern Hemisphere)

UT date and time of equinoxes and solstices on Earth
event	equinox		solstice		equinox		solstice	
month	March		June		September		December	
year	day	time	day	time	day	time	day	time
2016	20	04:31	20	22:35	22	14:21	21	10:45
2017	20	10:29	21	04:25	22	20:02	21	16:29
2018	20	16:15	21	10:07	23	01:54	21	22:22
2019	20	21:58	21	15:54	23	07:50	22	04:19
2020	20	03:50	20	21:43	22	13:31	21	10:03
2021	20	09:37	21	03:32	22	19:21	21	15:59
2022	20	15:33	21	09:14	23	01:04	21	21:48
2023	20	21:25	21	14:58	23	06:50	22	03:28
2024	20	03:07	20	20:51	22	12:44	21	09:20
2025	20	09:01	21	02:42	22	18:19	21	15:03
2026	20	14:46	21	08:25	23	00:06	21	20:50
2027	20	20:25	21	14:11	23	06:02	22	02:43
2028	20	02:17	20	20:02	22	11:45	21	08:20
2029	20	08:01	21	01:48	22	17:37	21	14:14
2030	20	13:51	21	07:31	22	23:27	21	20:09
2031	20	19:41	21	13:17	23	05:15	22	01:56
2032	20	01:23	20	19:09	22	11:11	21	07:57
2033	20	07:23	21	01:01	22	16:52	21	13:45
2034	20	13:18	21	06:45	22	22:41	21	19:35
2035	20	19:03	21	12:33	23	04:39	22	01:31
2036	20	01:02	20	18:31	22	10:23	21	07:12

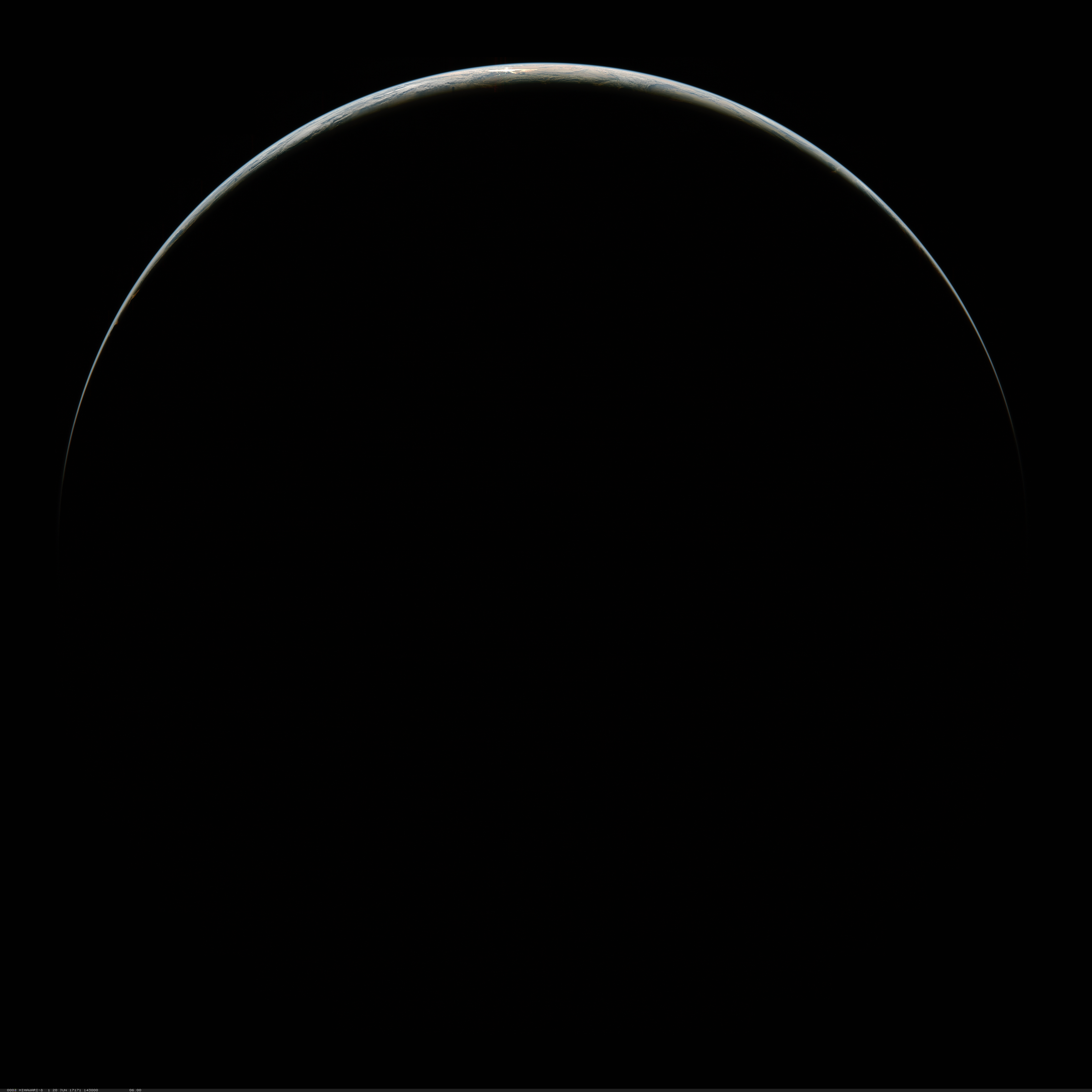
Earth during the summer solstice in June 2017

The summer solstice or estival solstice (Note: Also aestival solstice in British English. From Latin aestās, 'summer'.) occurs when one of Earth's poles has its maximum tilt toward the Sun. It happens twice yearly, once in each hemisphere (Northern and Southern). The summer solstice is the day with the longest period of daylight and shortest night of the year in that hemisphere. At either pole there is continuous daylight at the time of its summer solstice. The opposite event is the winter solstice.

The summer solstice occurs during the hemisphere's summer. In the Northern Hemisphere, this is the June solstice (20 or 21 June) and in the Southern Hemisphere, this is the December solstice (21 or 22 December). Since prehistory, the summer solstice has been a significant time of year in many cultures, and has been marked by festivals and rituals. Traditionally, in temperate regions (especially Europe), the summer solstice is seen as the middle of summer and referred to as "midsummer", although today in some countries and calendars it is seen as summer's beginning.

On the summer solstice, Earth's maximum axial tilt toward the Sun is 23.44°. Likewise, the Sun's declination from the celestial equator is 23.44°. In areas outside the tropics, the sun reaches its highest elevation angle at solar noon on the summer solstice.

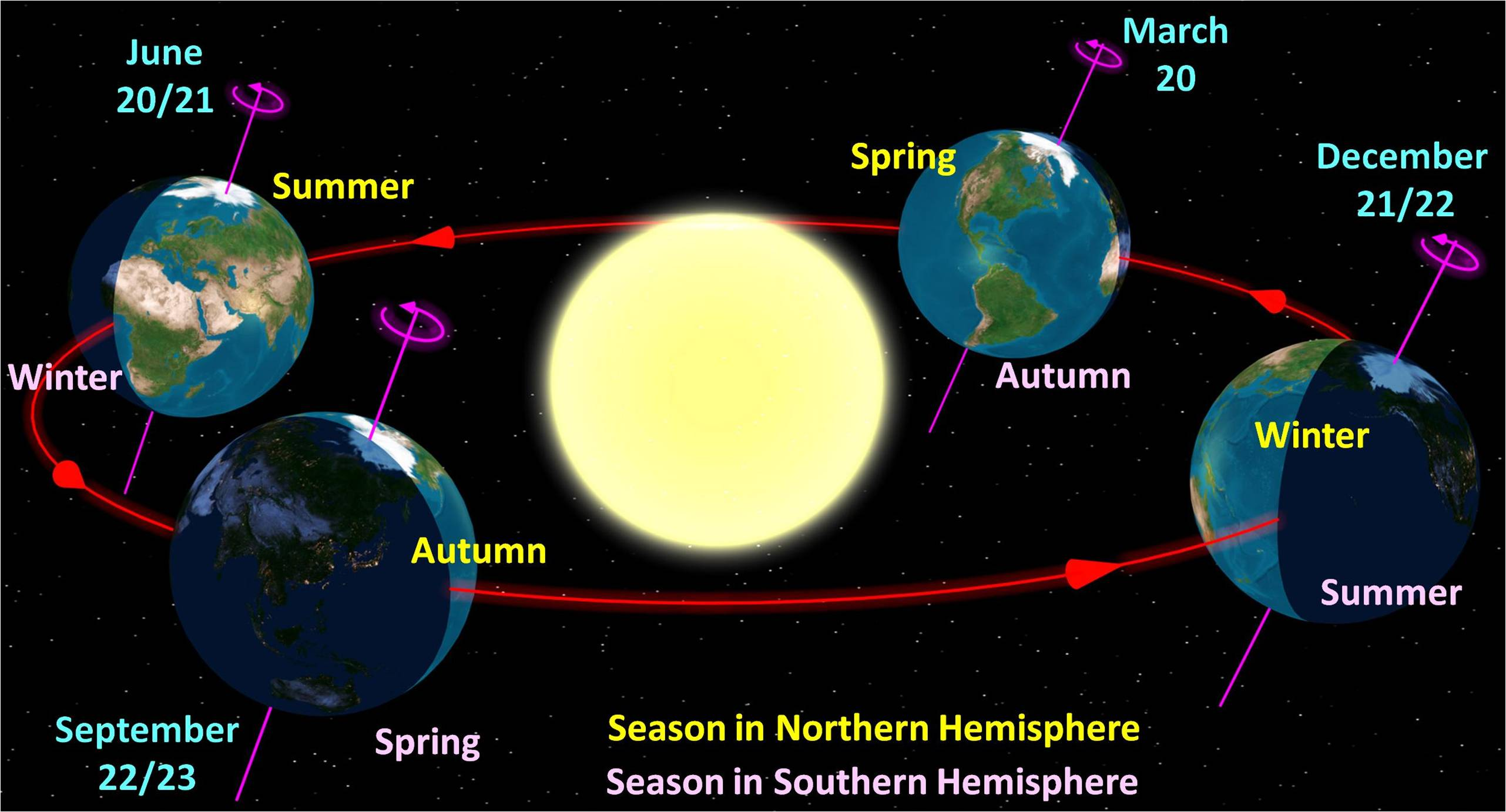
Diagram of Earth's seasons as seen from the north. Far left: summer solstice for the Northern Hemisphere. Front right: summer solstice for the Southern Hemisphere.

Although the summer solstice is the longest day of the year for that hemisphere, the dates of earliest sunrise and latest sunset vary by a few days. This is because Earth orbits the Sun in an ellipse, and its orbital speed varies slightly during the year.

== Culture ==
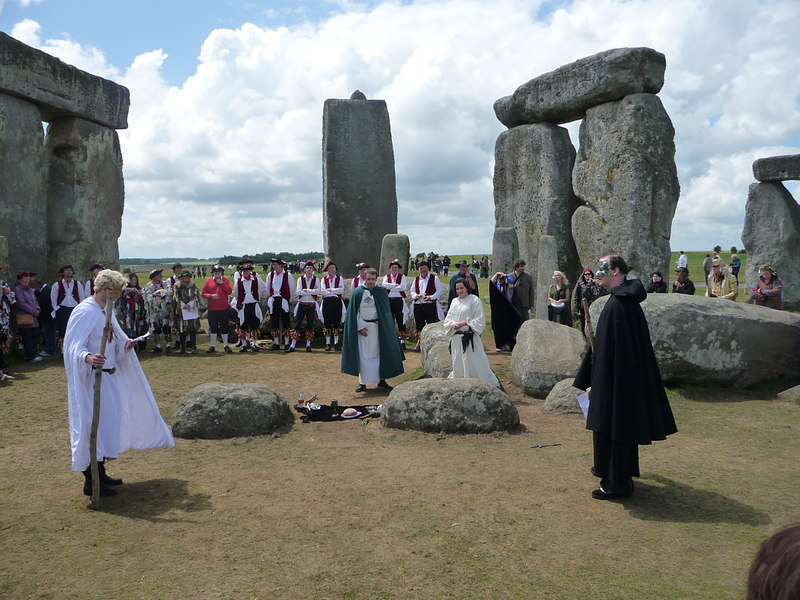
The solstice being celebrated at Stonehenge in England

There is evidence that the summer solstice has been culturally important since the Neolithic era. Many ancient monuments in Europe especially, as well as parts of the Middle East, Asia and the Americas, are aligned with the sunrise or sunset on the summer solstice (see archaeoastronomy). The significance of the summer solstice has varied among cultures, but most recognize the event in some way with holidays, festivals, and rituals around that time with themes of fertility.

In the Julian calendar of the Roman Empire, the date of the summer solstice was 24 June, and Marcus Terentius Varro wrote in the 1st century BC that the Romans saw this as the middle of summer. The Julian calendar had a flaw in that the solstices and equinoxes gradually fell on earlier dates. At the First Council of Nicaea (325), the Christian Church set the date of the spring equinox to 21 March, for the purpose of calculating Easter. This also brought the date of the summer solstice forward to 20 June.

The summer solstice was seen as the middle of summer in Anglo-Saxon England and called 'midsummer'. Some Anglo-Saxon calendars placed midsummer on the older date of 24 June while others place it on 20 June.

Elsewhere in northern Europe, traditionally the summer solstice is also seen as the middle of summer and it was reckoned as the night of 23–24 June. The summer solstice continues to be seen as the middle of summer in many European cultures, but in some cultures or calendars it is seen as summer's beginning. In Sweden, midsummer is one of the year's major holidays when the country closes down as much as during Christmas.

In Tahiti on the Southern Hemisphere where the solstice falls around 21 December, it historically marked rua maoro or rua roa where breadfruit had reached maturity and ready to be harvested; festivals like the Heiva are held during this time.

=== Observances ===
Traditional festivals

- Saint John's Eve (Europe), including:
  - Golowan (Cornwall)
  - Jaanipäev (Estonia)
  - Jāņi (Latvia)
  - Joninės (Lithuania)
  - Jónsmessa (Iceland)
  - Juhannus (Finland)
- Kupala Night (Slavic peoples)
- Shën Gjini–Shën Gjoni, Festa e Malit/Bjeshkës, Festa e Blegtorisë, etc. (Albanians)
- Summer Solstice at Stonehenge United Kingdom
- Tiregān (Iran)
- Xiazhi (China)
- Yhyakh (Yakuts)

Modern observances

- Day of Private Reflection (Northern Ireland)
- Fête de la Musique, also known as World Music Day
- Fremont Solstice Parade (Fremont, Seattle, Washington, United States)
- International Yoga Day
- National Indigenous Peoples Day (Canada)
- Santa Barbara Summer Solstice Parade (Santa Barbara, California, United States)

=== In folk music ===
- "Oh at Ivan, oh at Kupala" (Ukr. Ой на Івана, ой на Купала) - Ukrainian folk song.
- "Kupalinka" - (Belar. Купалінка) - Belarusian folk song
- "There is a lake behind the hill" (Lith. Už kalnelio ežerėlis) - Lithuanian folk song.

== Length of the day on northern summer solstice ==
The following tables contain information on the length of the day on 20 June 2016, close to the summer solstice of the Northern Hemisphere and winter solstice of the Southern Hemisphere. The data was collected from the website of the Finnish Meteorological Institute as well as from certain other websites.

The data is arranged geographically and within the tables from the longest day to the shortest one. Times that occur the next day (21 June) are marked with ^{+}.

Fennoscandia and the Baltic states
City	Sunrise 20 June 2016	Sunset 20 June 2016	Length of the day
(Russia) Murmansk	—	—	24 h
(Russia) Apatity	—	—	24 h
(Norway) Bodø	—	—	24 h
(Finland) Rovaniemi	—	—	24 h
(Sweden) Luleå	1:00	0:05^{+}	23 h 04 min
(Russia) Arkhangelsk	1:34	23:04	21 h 30 min
(Iceland) Reykjavík	2:55	0:03^{+}	21 h 08 min
(Norway) Trondheim	3:02	23:37	20 h 35 min
(Faroe Islands) Tórshavn	3:36	23:21	19 h 45 min
(Russia) Petrozavodsk	2:55	22:33	19 h 38 min
(Finland) Helsinki	3:54	22:49	18 h 55 min
(Russia) Saint Petersburg	3:35	22:25	18 h 50 min
(Norway) Oslo	3:53	22:43	18 h 49 min
(Estonia) Tallinn	4:03	22:42	18 h 39 min
(Sweden) Stockholm	3:30	22:07	18 h 37 min
(Latvia) Riga	4:29	22:21	17 h 52 min
(Denmark) Copenhagen	4:25	21:57	17 h 32 min
(Lithuania) Vilnius	4:41	21:59	17 h 17 min

Rest of Europe
City	Sunrise 20 June 2016	Sunset 20 June 2016	Length of the day
(Scotland) Edinburgh	4:26	22:02	17 h 36 min
(Russia) Moscow	3:44	21:17	17 h 33 min
(Republic of Ireland) Dublin	4:56	21:56	17 h 00 min
(Germany) Berlin	4:43	21:33	16 h 49 min
(Poland) Warsaw	4:14	21:00	16 h 46 min
(United Kingdom) London	4:43	21:21	16 h 38 min
(Ukraine) Kyiv	4:46	21:12	16 h 26 min
(France) Paris	5:46	21:57	16 h 10 min
(Austria) Vienna	4:53	20:58	16 h 04 min
(Hungary) Budapest	4:46	20:44	15 h 58 min
(Switzerland) Zürich	5:29	21:25	15 h 56 min
(Italy) Rome	5:34	20:48	15 h 13 min
(Spain) Madrid	6:44	21:48	15 h 03 min
(Portugal) Lisbon	6:11	21:04	14 h 52 min
(Greece) Athens	6:02	20:50	14 h 48 min

Africa
City	Sunrise 20 June 2016	Sunset 20 June 2016	Length of the day
(Egypt) Cairo	4:54	18:59	14 h 04 min
(Spain) Tenerife	7:08	21:05	13 h 57 min
(Senegal) Dakar	6:41	19:41	12 h 59 min
(Ethiopia) Addis Ababa	6:07	18:46	12 h 38 min
(Kenya) Nairobi	6:32	18:35	12 h 02 min
(Democratic Republic of the Congo) Kinshasa	6:04	17:56	11 h 52 min
(Tanzania) Dar es Salaam	6:32	18:16	11 h 43 min
(Angola) Luanda	6:20	17:56	11 h 36 min
(Saint Helena) Jamestown	6:49	17:59	11 h 10 min
(Madagascar) Antananarivo	6:21	17:21	10 h 59 min
(Namibia) Windhoek	6:30	17:15	10 h 44 min
(South Africa) Johannesburg	6:54	17:24	10 h 29 min
(South Africa) Cape Town	7:51	17:44	9 h 53 min

Middle East
City	Sunrise 20 June 2016	Sunset 20 June 2016	Length of the day
(Iran) Tehran	5:48	20:23	14 h 34 min
(Lebanon) Beirut	5:27	19:52	14 h 24 min
(Iraq) Baghdad	4:53	19:14	14 h 21 min
(Israel) Jerusalem	5:33	19:47	14 h 13 min
(Bahrain) Manama	4:45	18:32	13 h 46 min
(Qatar) Doha	4:44	18:26	13 h 42 min
(United Arab Emirates) Dubai	5:29	19:11	13 h 42 min
(Saudi Arabia) Riyadh	5:04	18:44	13 h 39 min
(Oman) Muscat	5:19	18:55	13 h 35 min
(Yemen) Sanaa	5:33	18:35	13 h 02 min

Americas
City	Sunrise 20 June 2016	Sunset 20 June 2016	Length of the day
(Canada) Inuvik	—	—	24 h
(United States) Fairbanks	2:57	0:47^{+}	21 h 49 min
(Greenland) Nuuk	2:53	0:03^{+}	21 h 09 min
(Canada) Iqaluit	2:11	23:00	20 h 49 min
(United States) Anchorage	4:20	23:41	19 h 21 min
(United States) Kodiak	5:07	23:14	18 h 06 min
(United States) Sitka	4:06	22:00	17 h 54 min
(United States) Unalaska	6:34	23:41	17 h 06 min
(Canada) Edmonton	5:04	22:07	17 h 02 min
(Canada) Winnipeg	5:19	21:40	16 h 21 min
(Canada) Vancouver	5:06	21:21	16 h 14 min
(United States) Seattle	5:11	21:10	15 h 59 min
(Canada) Ottawa	5:14	20:54	15 h 40 min
(Canada) Toronto	5:35	21:02	15 h 26 min
(United States) New York	5:24	20:30	15 h 05 min
(United States) Washington	5:42	20:36	14 h 53 min
(United States) Los Angeles	5:42	20:07	14 h 25 min
(United States) Miami	6:30	20:14	13 h 44 min
(Cuba) Havana	6:44	20:17	13 h 33 min
(United States) Honolulu	5:50	19:16	13 h 25 min
Mexico City	6:59	20:17	13 h 18 min
(Jamaica) Kingston	5:32	18:45	13 h 13 min
(Barbados) Bridgetown	5:33	18:27	12 h 54 min
(Nicaragua) Managua	5:21	18:11	12 h 50 min
(Trinidad and Tobago) Port of Spain	5:45	18:30	12 h 45 min
(Guyana) Georgetown	5:38	18:09	12 h 31 min
(Colombia) Bogotá	5:46	18:09	12 h 23 min
(Ecuador) Quito	6:12	18:19	12 h 06 min
(Peru) Lima	6:27	17:52	11 h 24 min
(Bolivia) La Paz	6:59	18:08	11 h 08 min
(Brazil) Rio de Janeiro	6:32	17:16	10 h 43 min
(Brazil) São Paulo	6:47	17:28	10 h 40 min
(Brazil) Porto Alegre	7:20	17:32	10 h 12 min
(Chile) Santiago	7:46	17:42	9 h 56 min
(Argentina) Buenos Aires	8:00	17:50	9 h 49 min
(Argentina) Ushuaia	9:58	17:11	7 h 12 min

Asia and Oceania
City	Sunrise 20 June 2016	Sunset 20 June 2016	Length of the day
(Russia) Provideniya	0:52	22:16	21 h 23 min
(Russia) Magadan	3:37	22:19	18 h 41 min
(Russia) Petropavlovsk	4:58	21:55	16 h 56 min
(Russia) Khabarovsk	4:57	21:04	16 h 07 min
(Mongolia) Ulaanbaatar	5:52	21:54	16 h 01 min
(Russia) Vladivostok	5:32	20:55	15 h 22 min
(China) Beijing	4:45	19:46	15 h 00 min
(South Korea) Seoul	5:11	19:56	14 h 46 min
(Japan) Tokyo	4:25	19:00	14 h 34 min
(China) Shanghai	4:50	19:01	14 h 10 min
(China) Lhasa	6:55	20:58	14 h 03 min
(India) Delhi	5:23	19:21	13 h 58 min
(Nepal) Kathmandu	5:08	19:02	13 h 53 min
(Taiwan) Taipei	5:04	18:46	13 h 41 min
Hong Kong	5:39	19:09	13 h 30 min
(Philippines) Manila	5:27	18:27	12 h 59 min
(Thailand) Bangkok	5:51	18:47	12 h 56 min
Singapore	7:00	19:12	12 h 11 min
(Indonesia) Jakarta	6:01	17:47	11 h 45 min
(Australia) Darwin	7:06	18:29	11 h 23 min
(French Polynesia) Papeete	6:27	17:32	11 h 04 min
(Australia) Sydney	6:59	16:53	9 h 53 min
(New Zealand) Auckland	7:33	17:11	9 h 37 min
(Australia) Melbourne	7:35	17:07	9 h 32 min
(New Zealand) Dunedin	8:19	16:59	8 h 39 min

The length of day increases from the equator towards the North Pole in the Northern Hemisphere in June (around the summer solstice there), but decreases towards the South Pole in the Southern Hemisphere at the time of the southern winter solstice.

== See also ==
- Juneteenth
- Father's Day
