= Art bike =

Bicycle modified for creative purposes

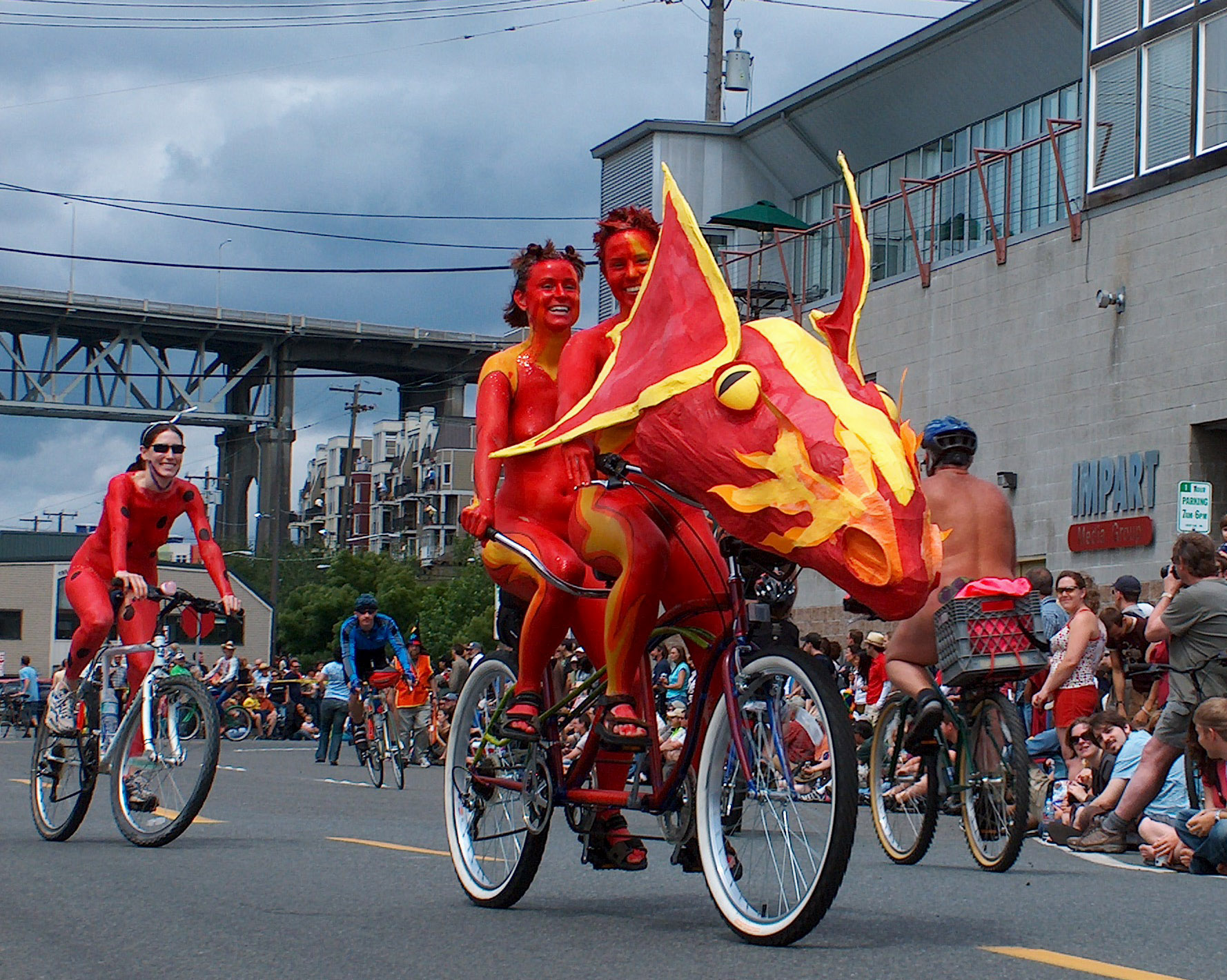
An art bike.

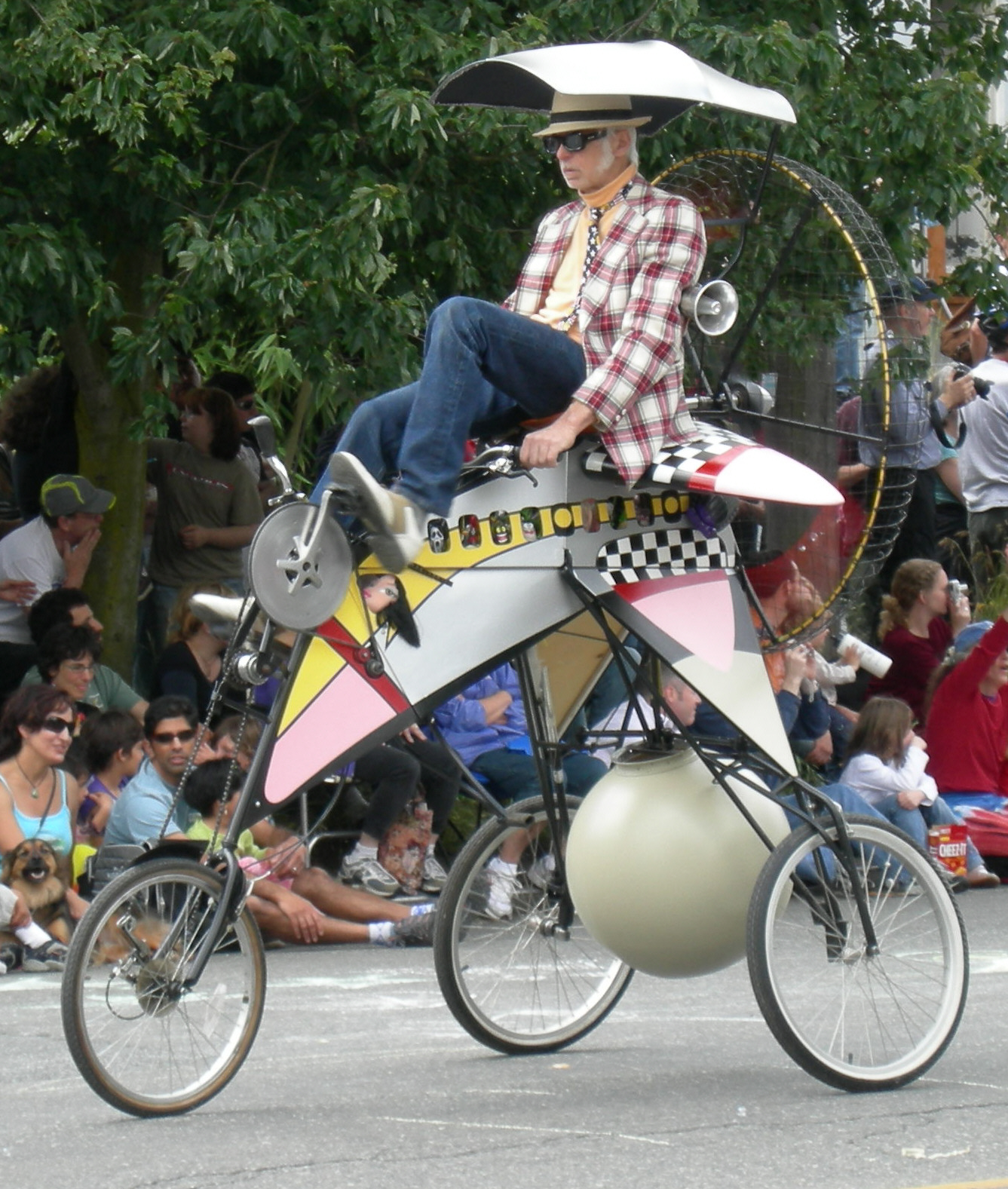
Art bikes are increasingly popular in the Summer Solstice Parade & Pageant, held annually in Seattle, Washington.

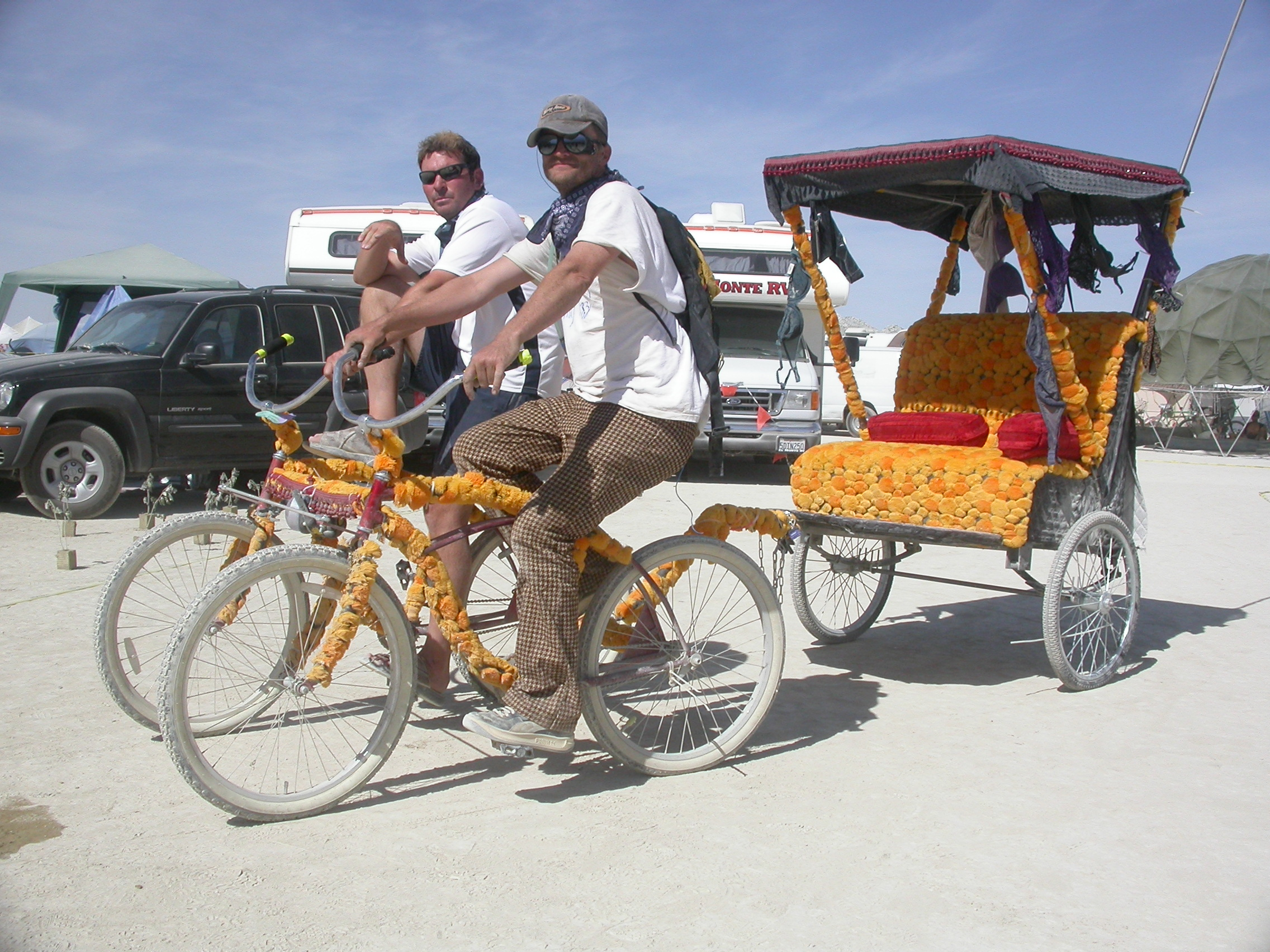
An art bike at Burning Man, Nevada USA

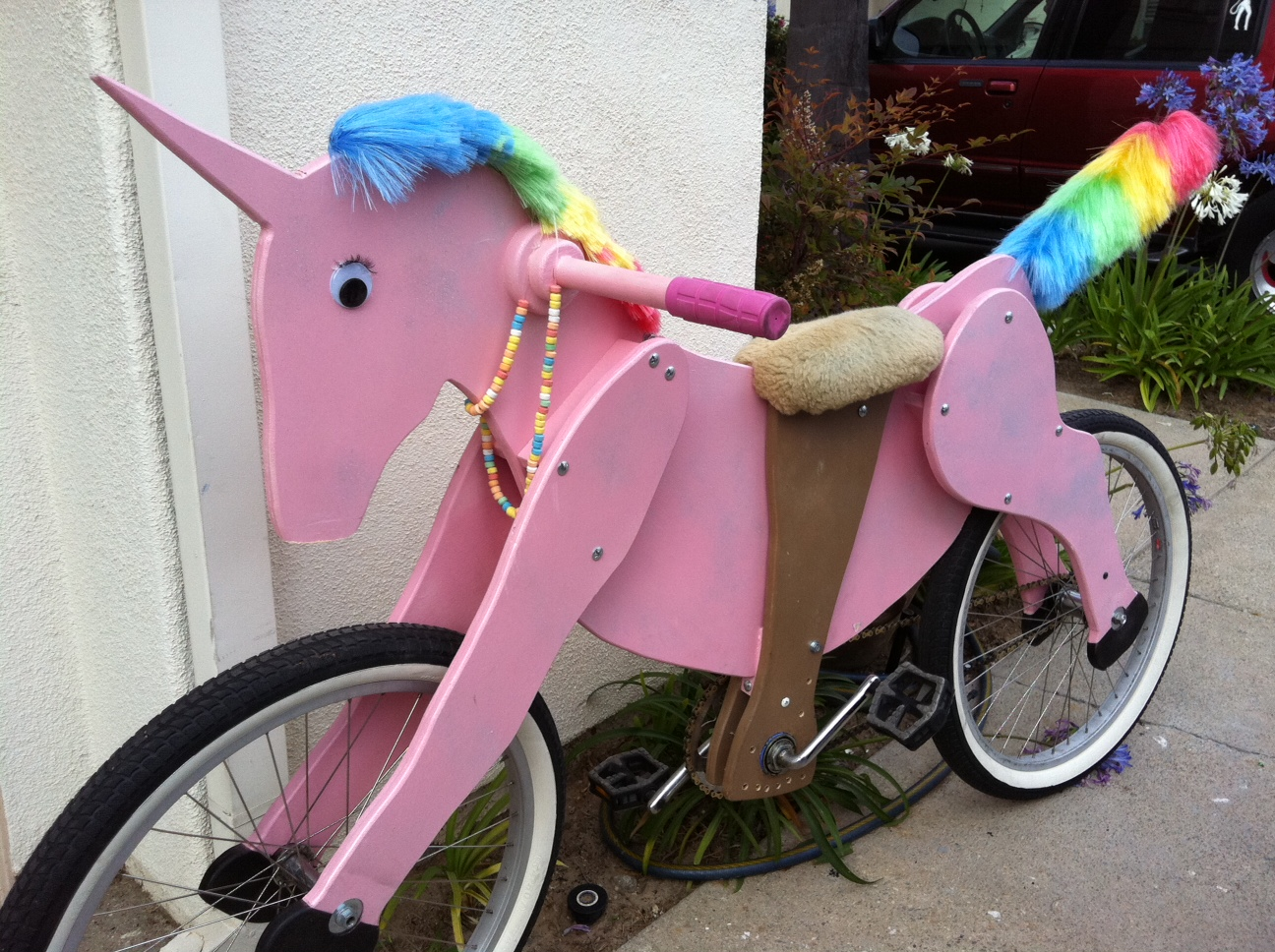
Pearl the Unicorn Bike

An art bike is any bicycle modified for creative purposes while still being ridable. It is a type of kinetic sculpture. The degree of artistic creativity and originality or new functionality of art bikes varies greatly, depending on the artist or designer's intentions (as well as the subjective interpretation of what "art" is by the observer).

== Examples ==
- The annual Burning Man festival (held in the Black Rock Desert of Nevada, United States) is a popular setting for members of the art bike community to display and ride their sometimes radically modified and decorated bicycles.
- The Dekochari is a form of art bike indigenous to Japan.
- A cycle rickshaw is a bicycle designed to carry passengers; in countries like Bangladesh, India, Japan and South Africa these cycle rickshaws may feature elaborate decorations and can be considered art bikes.
- Clown bikes and tall bikes are forms of art bikes.
- "Pimp My 'Fahrrad'" is a German TV show featuring "pimped" bicycles especially modified for urban environments.

== See also ==
- Outline of cycling
- Art car
- Art truck
