= Fremont Solstice Parade =

Summer solstice parade in Seattle

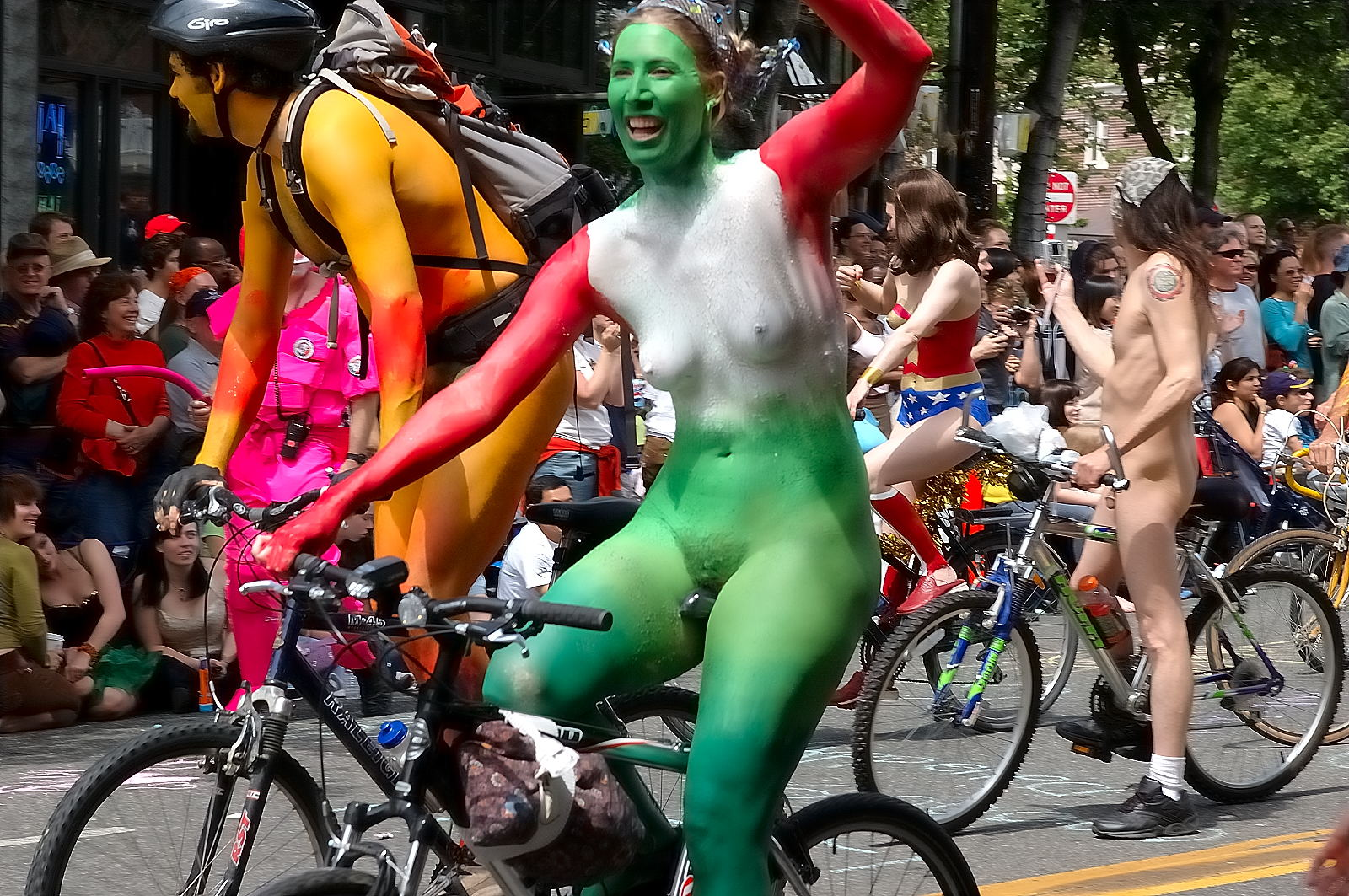
Solstice Cyclists, 2005

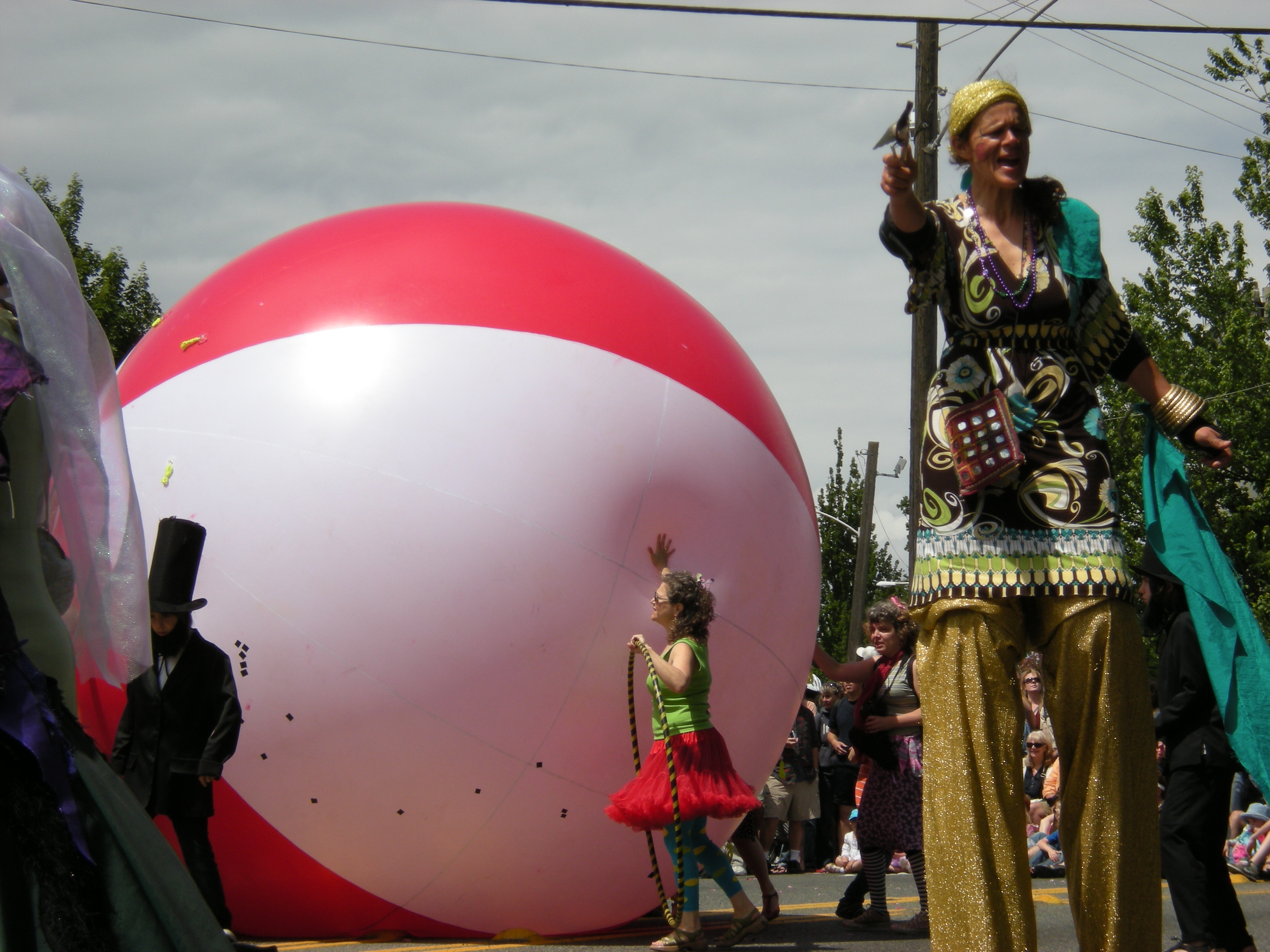
Stilter and giant beach ball, 2009

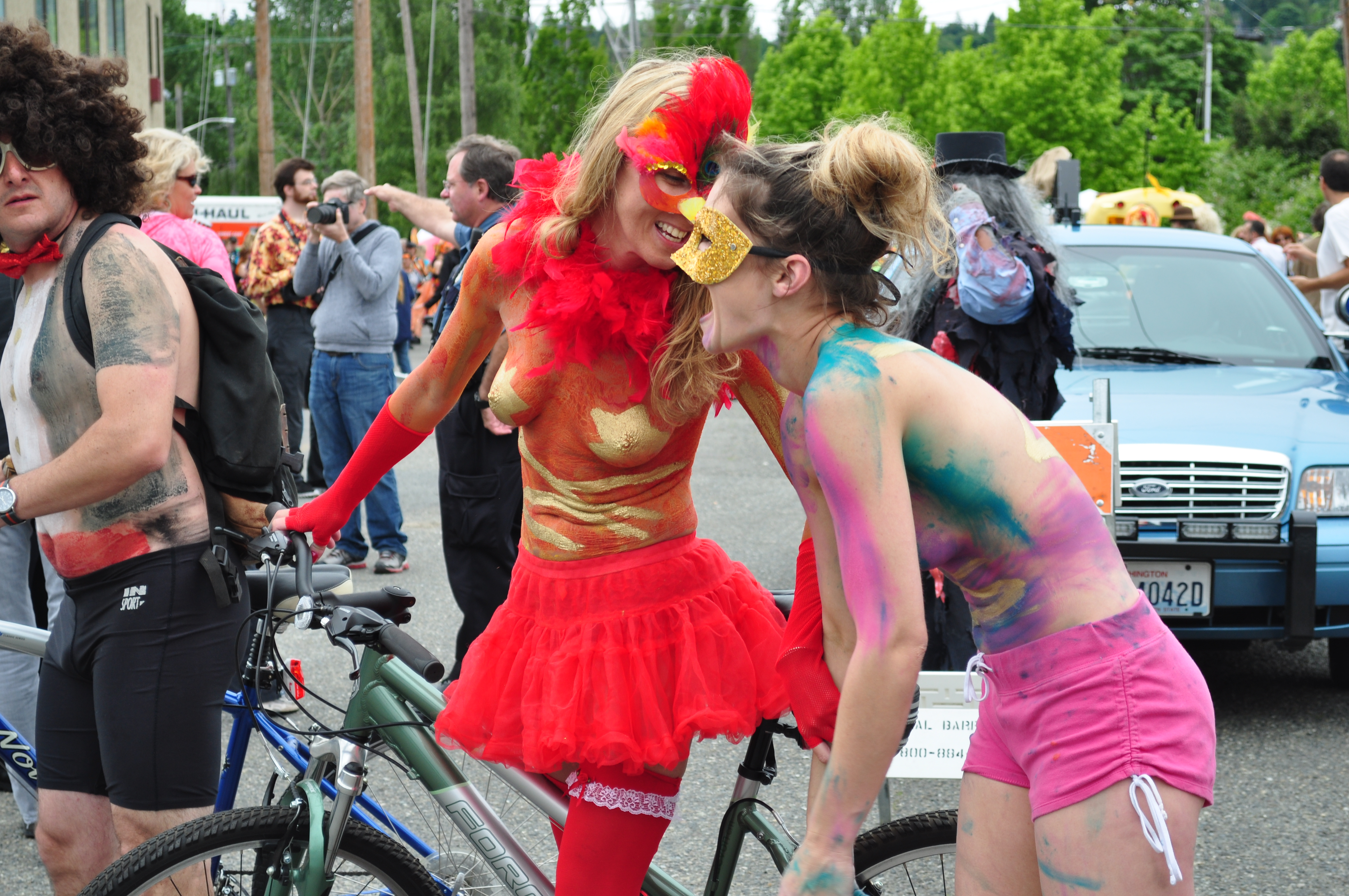
Cyclists before the parade, 2012

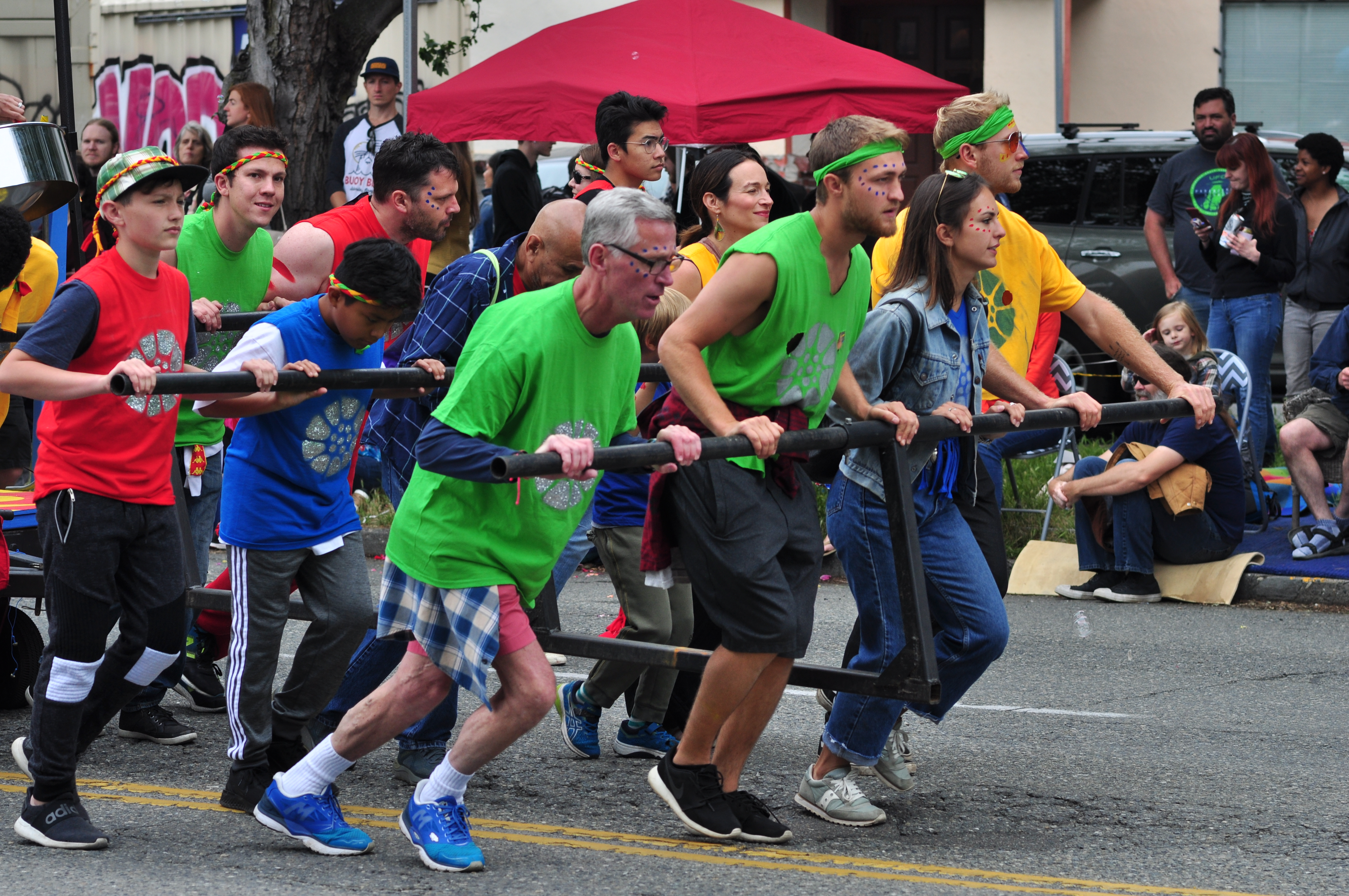
Hauling a float, 2019

The Fremont Solstice Parade is an annual event that occurs each June in Seattle, Washington, United States.

The Parade was founded by Barbara Luecke and Peter Toms in 1989. Luecke and Toms were inspired by the Santa Barbara Summer Solstice Parade and Celebration. The Parade distinguishes itself from other mainstream parades with the following unusual rules:

1. No printed words, signage or recognizable logos.
2. No live animals (except guide animals).
3. No motorized vehicles (except motorized wheelchairs)
4. No functional weapons.

== See also ==
- Arts in Seattle
- Bohemianism
- Culture jamming
- Santa Barbara Summer Solstice Parade
- Clothing-optional bike ride
