= Nudity and protest =

Use of the nude human form to further political or social change

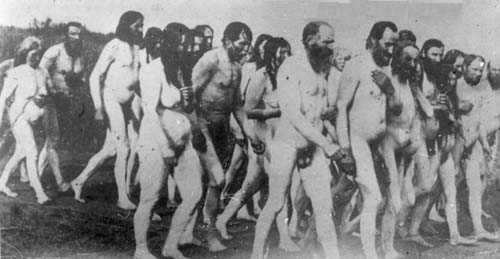
1903 protest of Canadian immigration policy change, by Spiritual Christian Freedomites in Saskatchewan.

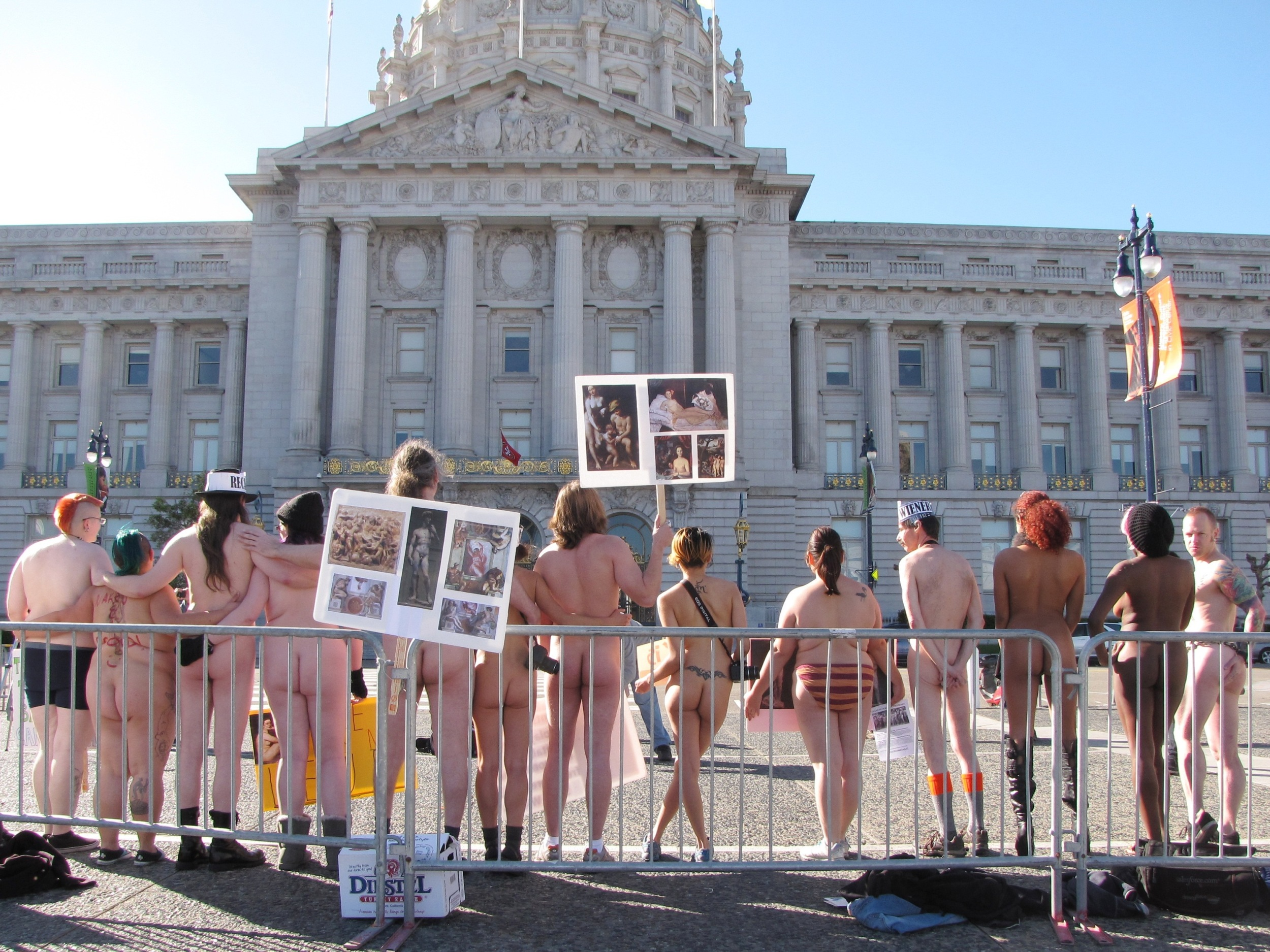
Nude people protesting San Francisco's nudity ban

Nudity is sometimes used as a tactic during a protest to attract media and public attention to a cause, and sometimes promotion of public nudity is itself the objective of a nude protest. The practice was first documented in the 1650s with Quakers "naked as a sign" practice. Later the tactic was used by svobodniki in Canada in 1903. The tactic has been used by other groups later in the century, especially after the 1960s. Like public nudity in general, the cultural and legal acceptance of nudity as a tactic in protest also varies around the world. Some opponents of any public nudity claim that it is indecent, especially when it can be viewed by children; while others argue that it is a legitimate form of expression covered by the right to free speech.

Even in places where public nudity is tolerated, it is still unexpected enough that its use by activists as a deliberate tactic is often successful in attracting publicity from the media. For example, on 19 July 2020, a young woman wearing only a face mask and stocking cap, later dubbed "Naked Athena" by reporters, confronted police in Portland, Oregon, during George Floyd protests. Despite the deployment of pepper balls and tear gas, she posed for police for several minutes before they withdrew. Photographs of her action went viral.

Some nude activism is not to promote a particular cause, but rather to promote public nudity itself, or to change community perceptions of the naked human body, or as an expression of a personal desire to be nude in public.

== Single issue protests ==
=== Anti-fur campaign ===
People for the Ethical Treatment of Animals (PETA) has used nudity to draw attention to its anti-fur campaign. Between 1992 and 2020, PETA ran their "I'd rather go naked than wear fur" campaign featuring celebrities, actors and models. In 2020, PETA discontinued the campaign after a majority of fashion houses and high street stores stopped using fur.

=== Brexit ===
On 29 June 2016, the Cambridge academic Victoria Bateman walked into a meeting of the Faculty of Economics naked, in protest against the results of the 2016 United Kingdom European Union membership referendum. She had written on her breasts and stomach "Brexit leaves Britain naked".

=== Canada-US Free Trade ===
Two "Topless Disturbance" protests took place on Canada's Parliament Hill against the proposed (and then finalized) Canada-US Free Trade Agreement, in 1987 and 1988.

=== Land rights ===
Women in the Amuru district of Uganda protested about their loss of land for farming.

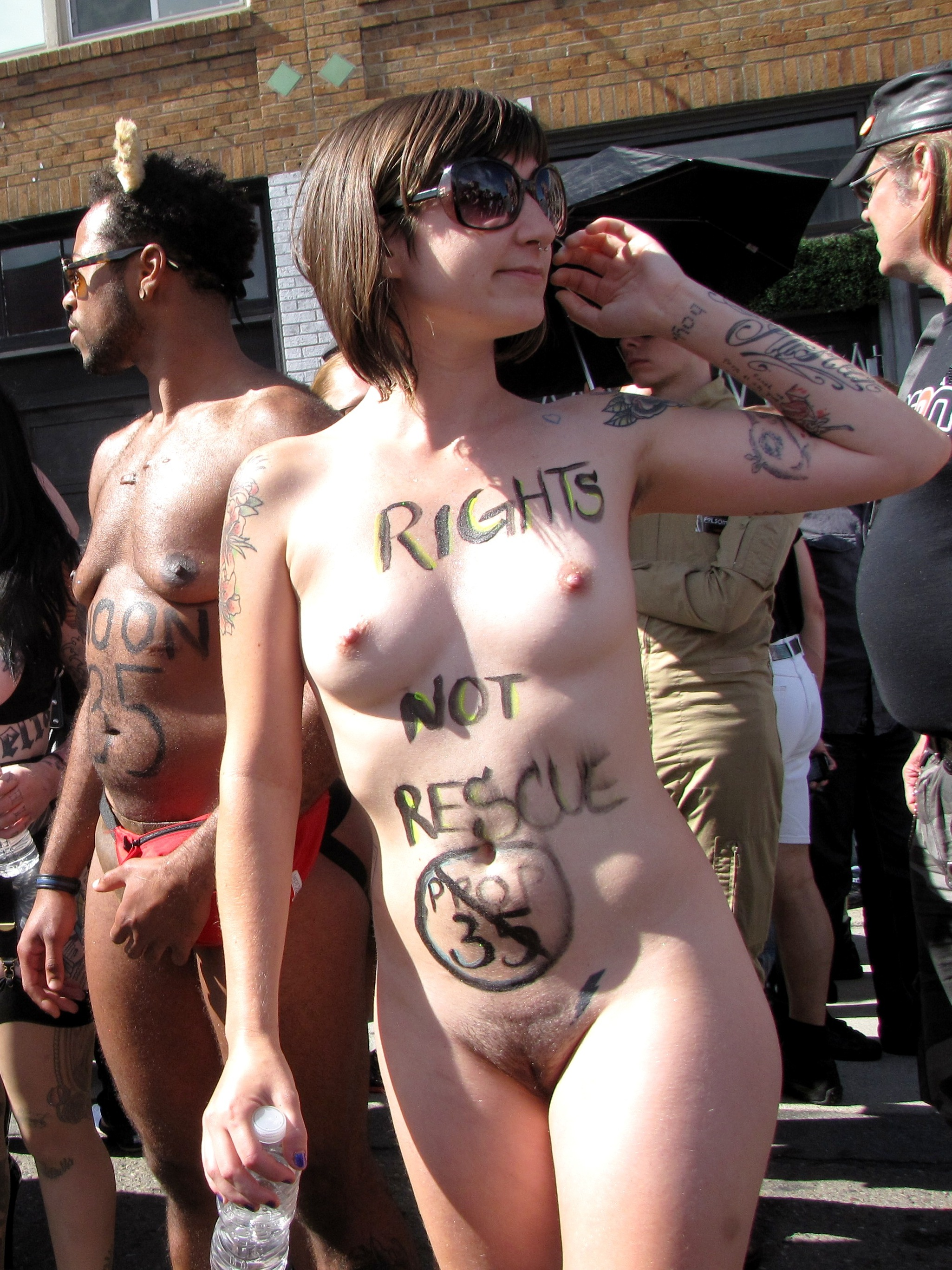
A nude woman demonstrates for sex workers' rights at Folsom Street Fair, San Francisco, CA in September 2012

=== Peace and anti-war ===
Groups used nudity to protest the Iraq War. Groups using their bodies to form words and symbols to convey their message included Baring Witness.

=== The African curse of nakedness ===
In some parts of Africa, women have used stripping naked on purpose as a curse, both historically, and in modern times. The idea is that women give life and they can take it away. The curse initiates an extreme form of ostracism, which anthropologist Terisa Turner has likened to "social execution". The curse extends to foreign men as well, and is believed to cause impotence, madness or other similar harm. The threat has been used successfully in mass protests against the petroleum industry in Nigeria, by Leymah Gbowee and Women of Liberia Mass Action for Peace during the Second Liberian Civil War, and against President Laurent Gbagbo of the Ivory Coast. In 2002 in Nigeria, members of the Niger Delta Women for Justice occupied a platform for oil extraction run by ChevronTexaco in order to protest against negative consequences of oil extraction and missing labor rights. When the military arrived to remove the protestors, the women threatened the soldiers to naked curse them. The soldiers did not touch the women.

A group of about 16 women bared their buttocks and stormed into the offices of the African National Congress (ANC) in Tshwane. The women were protesting against the outcome of an ANC Tshwane branch general meeting. The women claimed bouncers, armed with pangas and firearms, stormed the meeting and stopped them from participating in the voting process to elect the new branch committee.

=== Equal facilities for female athletes ===
To demand fuller implementation of the United States legislation Title IX, the 1976 Yale University women's rowing team held a naked protest. Pointing attention to their inadequate training facilities were more than a dozen team members, including Christine Ernst, Anne Warner and Ginny Gilder.

=== Transgender rights ===
In November 2011, a transgender woman from Morristown, Tennessee was arrested and jailed for 21 days for indecent exposure after removing her top in the parking lot of her local department of motor vehicles after they refused to alter the gender designation on her driver's license from male to female. This was despite the fact that the U.S. federal government Social Security office already had done so. As it is legal for a man to go topless in public and since the Tennessee Department of Public Safety refused to recognise her as female, Ms. Jones decided to protest her treatment by going topless, stating "if I was a male, I had the right to, when I stepped out the door, take off my shirt... It's not right for the state to ask me to be both male and female. A choice needs to be made. They cannot hold me to both standards."

=== Femicide is Genocide ===
In June 2017, more than 100 women stripped naked in front of the president's palace, Casa Rosada, in Buenos Aires, Argentina to protest against violence against women.

=== Human gene editing ===
On 8 February 2017, artist Rick Gibson walked naked in front of the Vancouver Law Courts in the middle of winter to protest Canada's ban of genetic engineering of the human genome. He walked nude in downtown Vancouver for 11 minutes, 45.75 seconds in a light rain and a temperature of 7 °C (45 °F).

== Public nudity movements ==
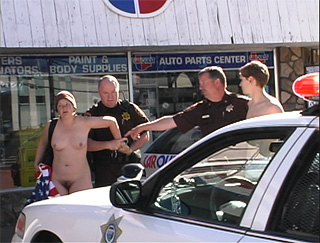
Activists Terri Sue Webb and Daniel Johnson being handcuffed and led away by police after a protest in Bend, Oregon on 2 May 2002

Not all people who engage in public nudity see themselves as nudists or naturists or belong to traditional naturist or nudist organizations. Several activists, such as Vincent Bethell, claim that associations with naturism or nudism are unnecessary. Others will point out that many people who participate in events such as clothing-optional bike rides or visit clothing-optional beaches do so casually and without association or formal affiliation to groups or movements. Activist Daniel Johnson believes that labels and affiliations overly complicate a relatively simple phenomenon, alienate others from a fear of over-commitment or undesirable stereotypes, and thus get in the way of integrating nudity into everyday life.

=== Clothing-optional bike rides ===
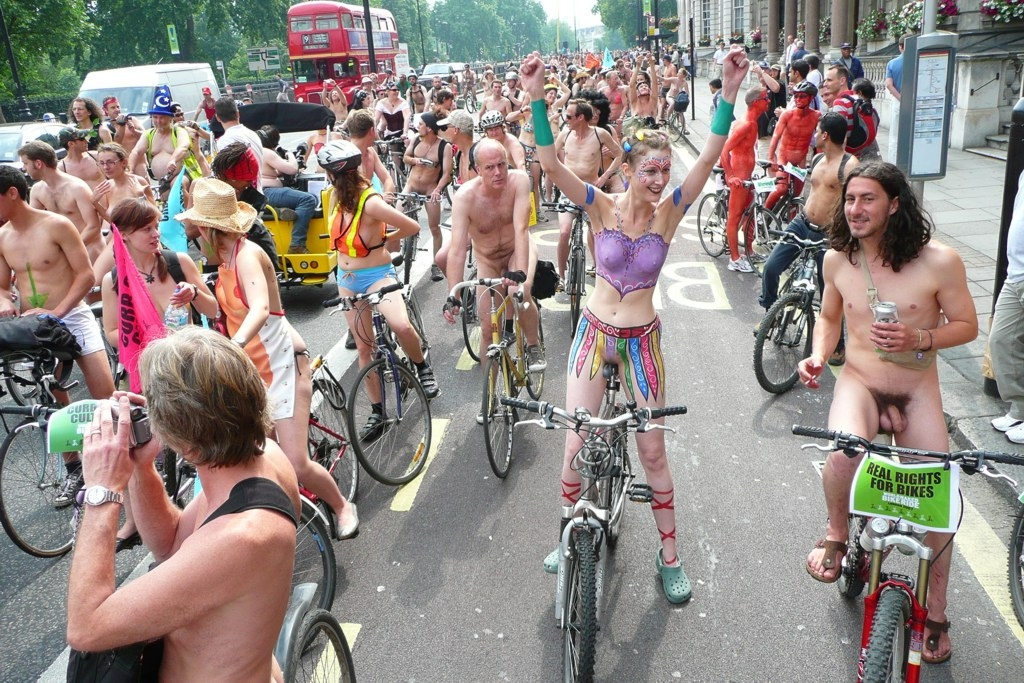
London 2007 WNBR participants

World Naked Bike Ride (WNBR) is an international clothing-optional bike ride in which participants plan, meet and ride together en masse on human-powered transport (the vast majority on bicycles, and fewer on skateboards, rollerblades, roller skates) to "protest oil dependency and celebrate the power and individuality of our bodies". This represents one of the few events that combine elements that could be described as pro nudity and pro cycling (as well as environmental).

Many of the political rides have their roots from Critical Mass and are often described or categorized as a form of political protest, street theatre, party-on-wheels, streaking, public nudity and clothing-optional recreation and thus attracts a wide range of participants. Since 1996 Critical Tits has been hosting a "raucous topless bicycle joyride" on Friday afternoon at the annual Burning Man festival in Nevada.

The Spanish movement, Manifestación Ciclonudista Mundial has had rides predating WNBR (since 2001) and has since spread to other countries in Europe.

=== FEMEN ===
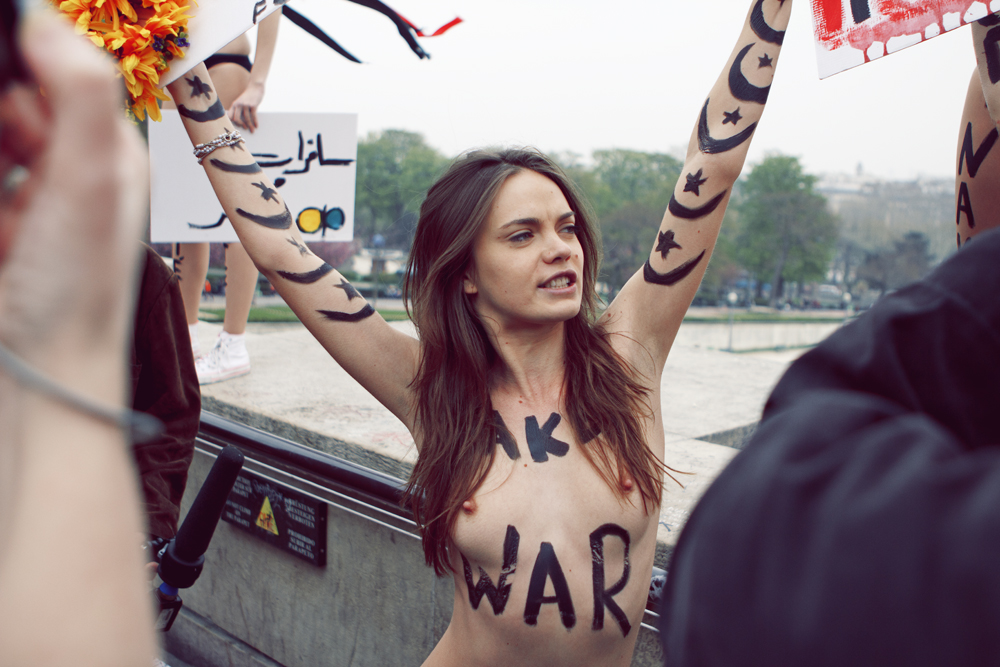
FEMEN protest in support of Aliaa Magda Elmahdy, Oksana Shachko pictured here in March 2012

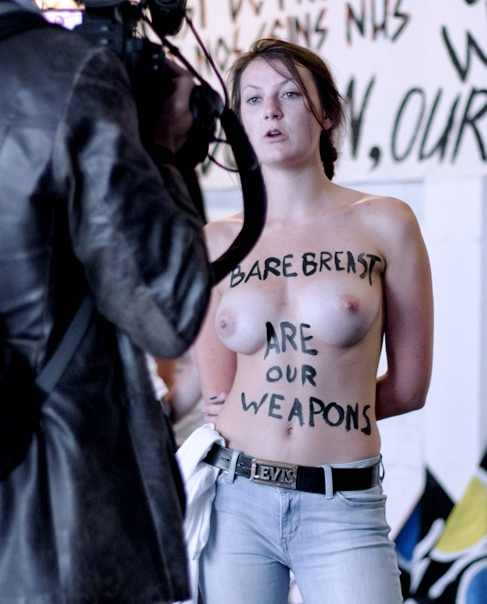
A FEMEN France protester, 2012

The protest group FEMEN (founded in 2008 in Ukraine) regularly stages topless protests against sex tourists, international marriage agencies, sexism and other social ills. These protests received worldwide press coverage in 2009. Since late 2011 FEMEN operations became not limited to Ukraine and they have demonstrated in other European countries including non-Ukrainian protesters. FEMEN justifies its provocative methods stating "If we staged simple protests with banners, then our claims would not have been noticed". FEMEN receives small financial backing by individuals. In January 2012, three members of the group staged a topless protest at the World Economic Forum in Davos, Switzerland. In October 2013 FEMEN had its largest membership in France (30 FEMEN France local activists in January 2013). In October 2012 the organization claimed it had about 40 activists in Ukraine, and another 100 who had joined their protests abroad.

== Naturist and nudist movements ==
There are a number of groups and individuals campaigning for the right to be naked in public.

=== Urbanudista ===
A group led by Avril X called UrbaNudismo has led several casual nudity excursions in high visibility public urban environments in Brazil as well as some Western European countries.

=== APNEL ===
APNEL is the prominent French nudity rights group.

=== NAKTIV ===
Naktiv.net is a generic Naked Activities site.

=== Denmark ===
In 1969, in Denmark, 300 individuals participated in a naked "wade-in" at a Danish beach, which helped push forward a reform of public policy. It is now allowable to be naked at any public beach in Denmark with only two major exceptions: Holmsland Klit and Hennestrand. The remaining 4,700 kilometers of Danish coast are clothing-optional.

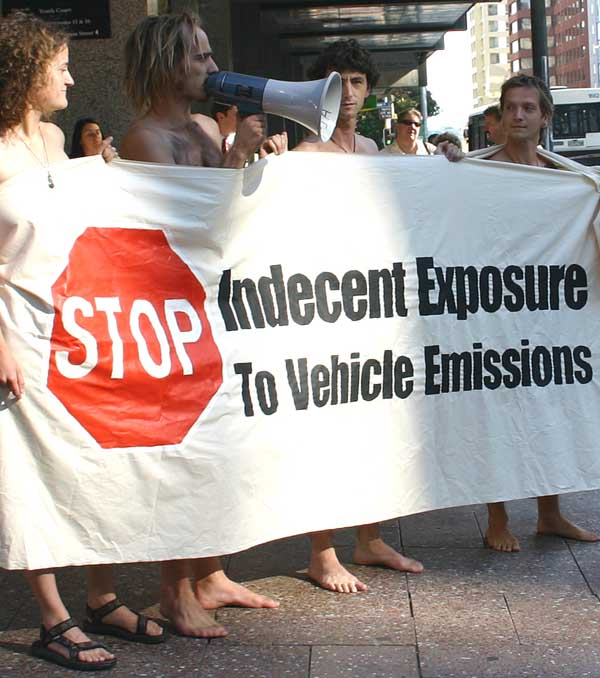
Protesters gathered outside a courthouse on 17 Feb 2005 to protest against the arrest of Simon Oosterman (second from left), Auckland's 2005 WNBR organiser.

=== Ireland ===
The Irish Naturism Association is the Republic of Ireland's nudist group. As of April 2018, it was "the fastest growing naturist association in Europe" with 231 members.

In July 2016, Carina Fitzpatrick, a female concert-goer at the KnockanStockan music festival in County Wicklow, Ireland, was arrested for revealing her breasts at the concert in an attempt to highlight the inequality between men being able to go topless during outdoor summer events whereas women can not. The incident opened up a conversation about women's bodily autonomy and nudism in Ireland.

=== United States ===
- Naturist Action Committee – NAC is a non-profit donor-supported organization that promotes and defends naturist interests in the courts, before legislative bodies, at universities, and to local business communities
- Friends of Disco Beach, Magnuson Beach Bares, Seattle Free Beach Campaign and Body Freedom Collaborative in Seattle
- Free Beach USA
- Barbara LaFleur walked nude into two stores in Saratoga Springs, NY in 2012 as a protest for naturist rights. "She is just a person who believes in the freedom of nudism. That was her explanation", said Saratoga County District Attorney James Murphy III.

=== Australia ===
The short-lived Naturist Lifestyle Party in New South Wales, Australia, aimed "to bring naturism into the public eye, and to get an equitable allocation of public resources to those who support the naturist lifestyle." Gerald Ganglbauer convened Free Beach Action NSW, a lobby group for naturism in New South Wales.

=== Netherlands ===
Robbert Broekstra (now deceased) was involved in a group called "Friends of Nature". They would often go for naked excursions on public lands, sometimes in urban areas, often taking pictures. He was also involved in INIC (International Naturist Information Center). He authored the book Robbert Broekstra's Nude World and his group appeared in "Naked Travels 1", by Charles MacFarland.

=== Germany ===
Topless protest in Berlin, Mauerpark, Amphitheater: "We are coming out, Free the nipple gender equality bike ride on 4th July 2026

- Wald-FKK – German movement for the liberalisation of public nudity. Founder Peter Niehenke was fined several times for indecent exposure because he went running nude in public spaces.
- Nacktwandern – German movement for the freedom to hike in the nude.
- Integral Nactiv – Nacktiv is a combination of the German word "nackt" (naked) and "aktiv" (active).

=== The Freedom to be Yourself ===
The Freedom to be Yourself campaign (TFTBY or FTBY) was founded in 1998 by Vincent Bethell. The group, according to Bethell is about "the right to be naked in public". Supporters of TFTBY organized several grassroots naked protests in public in London; protests also took place in Brighton, Bristol, Birmingham, Coventry, and some in the United States.

Bethell made legal history in January 2001 by being the first defendant to stand trial naked in a UK court. The trial was at Southwark Crown Court London. He was naked throughout this court case, and was found not guilty.

Terri Sue Webb is an activist living in Bend, Oregon, who was one of few activists in the United States active in the TFTBY campaign. She has been imprisoned and released multiple times for public nudity. On several occasions she has remained nude while incarcerated, often resulting in a much longer jail sentence. There has been quite a bit of media coverage of her activities. Daniel Johnson went nude with her in public on two occasions in 2001 and 2002.

Stephen Gough, also known as "Steve Gough" and "the naked rambler", is an activist from Eastleigh, Hampshire, famous for walking the length of Great Britain from Land's End to John o' Groats in 2003–2004 and again in 2005–2006 (that year accompanied by his girlfriend Melanie Roberts), with nothing on except boots, socks, rucksack and sometimes a hat. He has been arrested several times and put in prison in the course of his rambles. In his last walk he was only arrested twice in England, and released almost immediately, but due to the different legal system and laws in Scotland, he was arrested many more times after crossing the border and spent time in HMP Edinburgh, then moved to HMP Barlinnie Glasgow in June 2008.

Richard Collins has been cycling naked through his home town of Cambridge, England for some time. He had been organizing several protests on the TFTBY Stop Segregation discussion group (no longer in existence). Collins has been arrested numerous times and released, although he was convicted of an offence under section 5 of the Public Order Act 1986, in Bournemouth, England, on 13 June 2011 after his nude cycling attracted complaints approximately 12 months earlier. He was in the news again in 2023 when asked to leave a Wetherspoons pub.

== Topfreedom ==
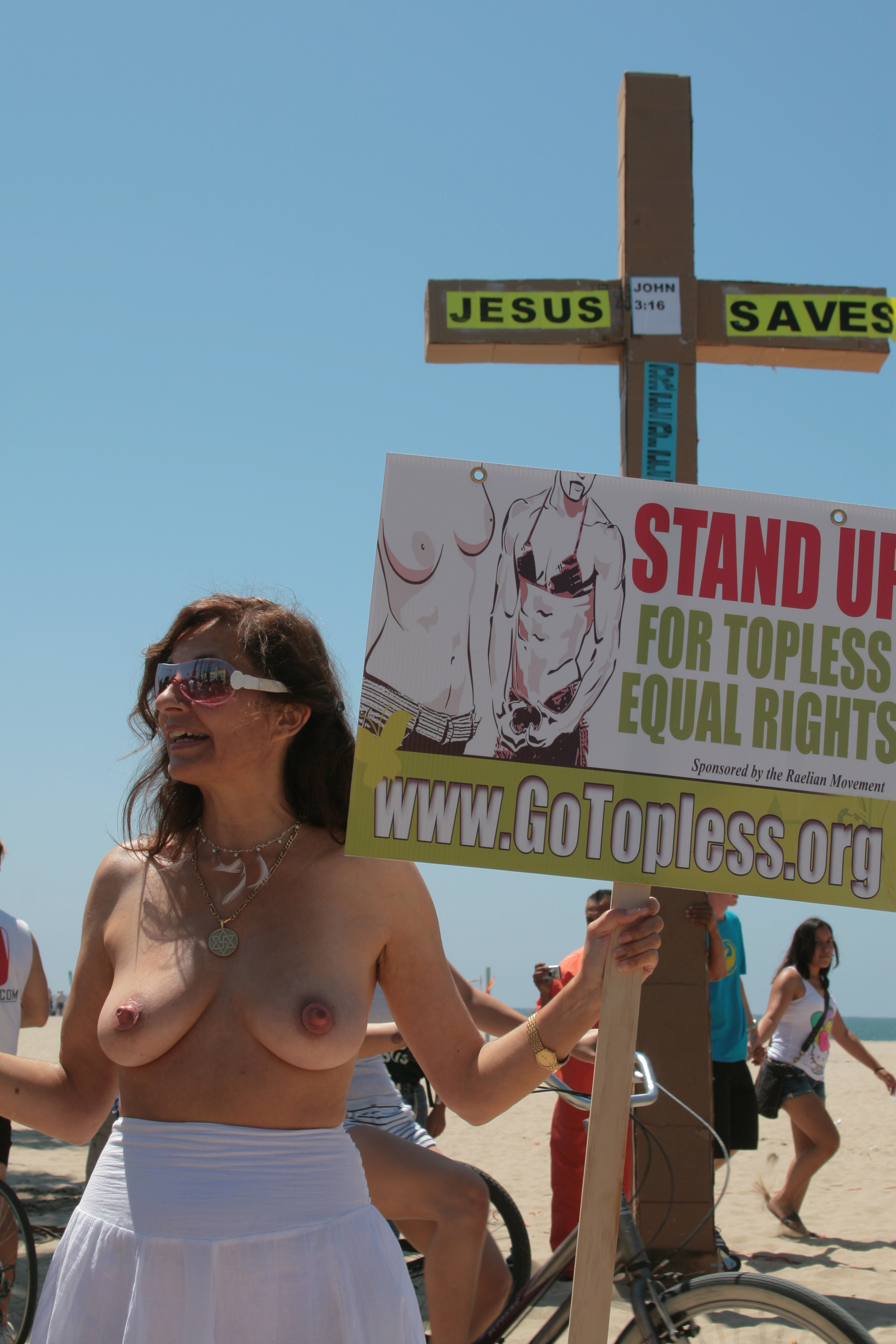
Protest for female topfree equal rights of 2011 "Go Topless" day in Venice Beach, California

The topfreedom movement has challenged the law in a number of countries, especially in North America and in Europe, on sex equality grounds arguing that the present public indecency laws discriminate against women. The movement advocates equal rights for women to be topfree in the same circumstances that a man is permitted to be bare-chested.

The Topfree Equal Rights Association (TERA) is a Canadian organization which endeavors to assist women who are having legal troubles exercising their rights to be topfree. Their website states that they serve both Canada and the United States. The organization also aims to inform and educate the public about topfreedom, and to change laws against topfreedom in North American jurisdictions. GoTopless goes further and organizes demonstrations to protest against the legal and public attitude to the inequality, in various locations including New York City. In Sweden, Bara Bröst is active in campaigning for topfreedom, as is Topless Front in Denmark. In France, the feminist collective Les TumulTueuses has the slogan: "My body if I want, when I want, like it is" ("Mon corps si je veux, quand je veux, tel qu'il est").

== See also ==
- Ahoo Daryaei
- Civil disobedience
- Lady Godiva
- List of social nudity organizations
- Nude recreation
- Timeline of social nudity
- Zevs Cosmos

== Filmography ==
- Being Human A film by Lisa Seidenberg, 31 minutes, 2003 Metro Video
- Taboo – 40 Years of Censorship. Part 1 of 4: Shock of the Nude; BBC2 Television series ran at 9:50 pm (40 mins). Aired Wednesday, 21 November 2001.

=== Videos and pictures ===
- 30 minute documentary by Johnny Zapatos (High Altitude Films) of the first World Naked Bike Ride to take place on the streets of London (4 parts)
- Pictures of the World Naked Bike Ride on Flickr
- You Never Bike Alone – Feature documentary includes section on WNBR history
