= List of clothing-free events =

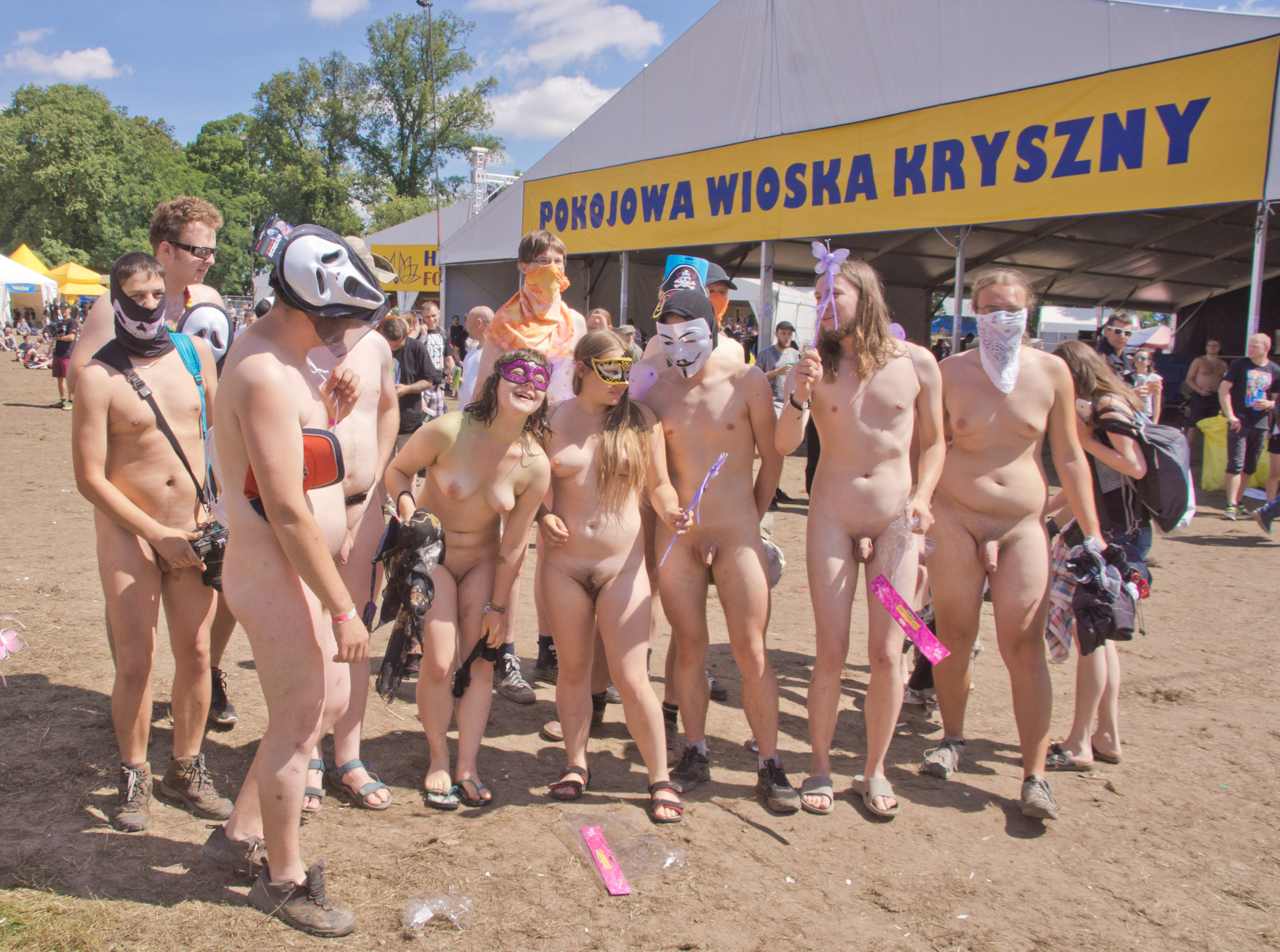
Naked people at a festival

Clothing-free or naked events are events where people can be naked in public. They are a form of social nudity, and may or may not be aimed at people who consider themselves naturists or nudists. Many of the events include aspects of sports or exercise, live music, and fancy dress.

== Generic events ==
- Body painting, an art form involving painting directly onto the human body. Participants are often naked.
- Clothing-optional bike ride
- Naked party
- Naked yoga
- Nude hiking
- Nude swimming
- Nude wedding

== Specific events ==
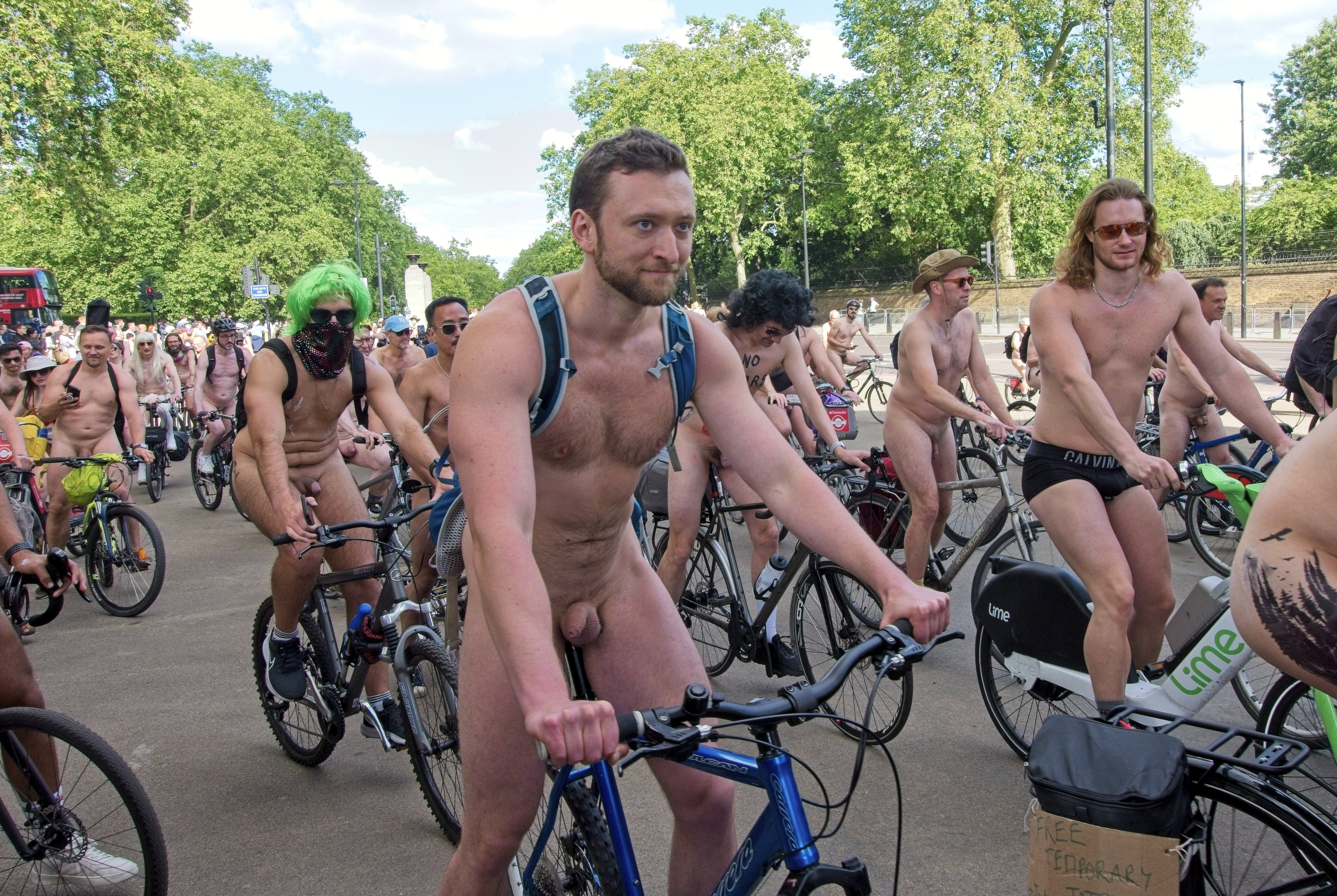
Participants in the World Naked Bike Ride London 2024 cycle on The Mall

- Burning Man
- Folsom Street Fair
- Fusion Festival
- Miss and Mr. Nude America
- Naked Pumpkin Run
- Nakukymppi
- Primal Scream, a semesterly tradition at Harvard College
- Starkers!, a naked club night in London, England
- World Naked Bike Ride
- World Naked Gardening Day

== See also ==
- Nude recreation
- List of places where social nudity is practised
