= APNEL =

French organization seeking to decriminalize nudity

The Association pour la promotion du naturisme en liberté (APNEL) is a French organization that seeks decriminalization of nudity, with particular emphasis on the section of the French penal code relating to sexual exhibitionism.

== Extract from the association's statutes ==
The "Association Pour la Promotion du Naturisme en Liberté" (APNEL) is a French association with international scope, registered under current statutes and governed by the law of 1 July 1901 and the decree of 16 August 1901.

APNEL is an association which adheres to the spirit and ethics of the environmental movement and the naturist movement, and wishes to collaborate closely with both of them. Its aim is that French law might catch up with the laws of its European neighbours in regard to the right to be naked.

The object of the association is as follows:

- To defend and promote the right to be naked. The association is working to clarify article 222–32 of the French Penal Code so that simple nudity is no longer identified with sexual exhibitionism. It considers that to live naked is a fundamental human right which should be registered in the French Constitution and in the other texts relating to human rights.
- The association has a duty to legally support its members in situations where they are unjustly apprehended in the course of naturist activities. It will launch a fine-sharing collection (French: solidarinue) in such cases, having first obtained the approval of the board of directors (French: Conseil d'Administration).

== Origin of the Association ==
=== Discussion of the idea on the Internet ===
For several years the concept of the right to be naked was brought up periodically on an Internet discussion group. The underlying problem concerned unforeseen meetings between naturists and non-naturists. Even though these meetings usually took place with no problem at all, the question of the legality of the practice of nudity outside of places specifically reserved for naturism caused many debates. Most of the supporters of the right to be naked consider that there is a gap in the French Penal Code, which while not explicitly forbidding simple nudity, does not explicitly authorize it.

The idea of creating a nationwide association of naturist walkers dates from April 2006, and the following month a proposal for an association's statutes was discussed. However, the people who were interested in forming such an association were not able to agree on the exact terms to best describe certain concepts, for example the list of operating constraints to be used in the association's statutes.

=== Two Convictions incite reaction ===
The next autumn, two events boosted interest in this kind of association:

At the beginning of September 2006 a naked man was walking alone with his shorts in his hand in a forest in Essonne when from about fifty meters away a person near a barn shouted at him "ça va pas!" (That's not allowed!). He just answered "si" (It is) before turning back without getting dressed again. Later he was arrested by police who told him they were acting on a complaint made by a gamekeeper and he was told that the place was a gay Mecca. At the police station a report was made accusing him of "public indecency" and "sexual exhibition". After the accused had explained his practice of naturism and the existence of collectively organized naked walks, he was told that the Public Prosecutor had treated the affair as a final warning. Since this event he has not dared to walk naked alone for fear of heavy penalties if he is caught again.

In December 2006 a naturist in Seine-et-Marne took part in a television programme on the subject of modesty. After some filming at his home, he drove nude in his car with the television journalists. Being hungry, he stopped at the local McDonald's to order some food but without getting out of his car. After he had paid at the first window two cashiers approached and asked him if he was naked, which he confirmed. The journalists were filming the scene, which seemed to delight the cashiers. After he had parked his car to await the completion of his order two policemen arrived and arrested him roughly at gunpoint. He was, however, able to put on his shorts before getting out of the car. At the police station he was told that as a result of the complaint of three cashiers (one of whom was pregnant and had been attacked the previous week), he would be charged with "sexual exhibition in flagrante delicto on the public highway". Although he argued verbally for a long time claiming in particular that he had only been only visible as bare-chested from outside his car, he was summoned the following month by the prosecutor who fined him €300 as a settlement under criminal law. Being unable to find a lawyer prepared to defend him in a possible trial, the accused, who is a state employee, chose to accept the verdict which amounted to an admission of guilt.

=== From the first naturist fine-sharing collection (solidarinue) to the creation of APNEL ===
Having heard of the above arrest, other members of the discussion group (randonue) organized a fine-sharing collection (solidarinue) to spread the payment of the fine between the maximum number of people. At a rate of 10 € per person approximately three times the amount required was collected in less than two months. A few hundred euros of support even came from Belgium.

The naturist who was fined did not profit from the collection. He also contributed €10 and decided to use the excess collected for the creation of APNEL of which he became the first president. Statutes very similar to the original were deposited in the sub-prefecture of Palaiseau in March, but it was not until June 2007, after the publication of the notice in the Gazette, that the establishment of the Association for the Promotion of Naturism en Liberté was announced on the Internet.

APNEL began to be an active organisation at its General Assembly in January 2008. In 2008 the association was administered by eight members, including seven French and one Belgian. A woman was elected president. Following the general assembly in 2009 the number of directors was increased to 12 with more regions represented. Since 2010, the association has had over 150 members. It has been affiliated to the French Naturist Federation since April 2011.

== Activities since the inception of APNEL ==
=== Awareness of the association and the problems it raises ===
During the summer of 2008 numerous newspapers devoted articles to naturist freedom. Over half of these articles made mention of APNEL and the issues it raised:

- Le Nouvel Observateur, 24–30 July 2008
- Le Parisien (Ed Essonne), 27 July 2008
- Radio France International, Visitors of the day with Caroline Lafargue, 27 August 2008
- Le Vif (Belgium), August 2008
- La Vie au Soleil, August 2008
- Le Bien public, 7 September 2008
- On 4 November 2008, the president of APNEL welcomed a host from the television channel, Téva, who came with her crew during a naturist meal. APNEL was cited during the introduction to the televised report.
- On 11 November 2008, the newspaper Libération included a portrait of Sylvie Fasol, a woman suffering from bone problems involving periodic hospitalizations since childhood who, in a depressive mood after several deaths in her family was invited by her pharmacist to participate in a naturist walk (randonue). She felt very well accepted by the naturists and the practice of naturism gave her an opportunity to better accept her body, before engaging in the promotion of naturist freedom from within APNEL which was widely quoted in the article.
- As a result of this article, one week later Philippe Bouvard devoted a show "Les Grosse Têtes" on RTL to the same subject.
- On 22 May 2009, following a referendum result prohibiting naturist hiking in a canton of Switzerland, a team from Swiss television came to investigate the issue of naturist freedom during a naturist walk organized for them in the Forest of Fontainebleau.
- In June 2009, the Rennes Monthly devoted two pages to naturist hiking and APNEL, but the use of the term "{lang|fr|à poil" (a deprecating term for nude which was often repeated in the article) did not please everybody.
- On 8 September 2009, the show "Nude in Public for a Good Cause" on France Culture began by discussing naturist hiking and APNEL before addressing other situations where nudity is also practised.
- On 12 November 2010, the programme "Thalassa" on France 3 Television broadcast a documentary about naturism which included a report of a naturist walk in the Calanques (mountains near Marseille) with participants being mostly members of APNEL.

Various events involving naked people were also an opportunity for members of APNEL to promote their association:

- Participation in an exhibition of naturism at Héliomonde
- Participation in the World Naked Bike Rides (French: cyclonues) in London and Brighton after a cyclonue in Paris in 2009 was abandoned due to police opposition
- Participation in a naked photo shoot in a vineyard organized by Greenpeace on 3 October 2009 with photographer Spencer Tunick

=== Influencing political decision-makers ===
This is one of the aims of the association, but no legislative work (like writing a bill) has yet been undertaken.

On the other hand, in 2009, one of the organizers of a naturist group in Provence made contact with the city of Seillans and obtained official permission for naturist walks in forests within the commune. A municipal order authorized two randonues on Sunday and Easter Monday with a municipal police officer to supervise them.

Also to be noted, in Marseille contacts with the Groupment d'Intérêt Public des Calanques, which envisages the creation of a national park of 12,500 hectares, resulted in naturism being an officially recognized activity without limitation throughout the whole massif outside of habitations, car parks and frequented trails.

=== Supporting prosecuted naturists ===
In early 2008, APNEL organized a fine-sharing collection (solidarinue) for a person who, having sunbathed naked next to his car parked beside a canal and then dressed himself, had to suddenly drop his trousers because of a health problem, was seen doing it from the other bank and fined by the court.

In the summer of 2009, even although all members of the association did not share their extreme commitment, certain officers of APNEL:

- visited Stephen Gough, imprisoned in Scotland after having crossed Great Britain naked. He continues to refuse any clothing during court hearings and is arrested and reimprisoned whenever he is released from jail. A collection of money and a postcard were also organized for Steve Gough's Christmas.
- followed the issue of Irwin, living near the border between Spain and France and practising naturism in both countries, who, after a conviction for being seen naked while putting out his garbage in the street, brought the matter before the European Court.

The year 2013 has been an opportunity to address the problem of vagueness of the law on sexual exhibitionism. It all started in February when a teacher on vacation near La Roche-Chalais decided to walk around naked in a secluded forest area. He was seen by a woman who followed him, noted the registration number of his car, and made a report to the police.

The next day, the police searched his room and examined the files from his computer before turning into custody 21.

Prosecuted for indecent exposure, he refused to accept this term. Indeed, he had chosen a secluded place to walk naked and tried not to offend anyone. Besides, the woman who denounced him did not appear. He contacted the APNEL 22 and obtained their support.

An appearance on prior recognition of guilt took place in May 2013. The accused denying the charge of indecent exposure, the case was referred to the court for trial at Périgueux .

The trial took place on July 1, 2013. Several members of the APNEL came to support. This was an opportunity for the lawyer, Tewfik Bouzenoune, to ask a priority issue of constitutionality (QPC = question prioritaire de constitutionalité) because Article 222-32 of the Criminal Code is too imprecise for every citizen to know what is legal or not.

The attorney (the same as for the hearing in May) did not seem to wish the Constitutional Council to consider the right to nudity. For him, given the case law of the Court of Cassation, the case was clear enough: even if the accused walked around naked, he did not try to show his nakedness, which was deliberately hidden on hearing a noise. Therefore, there has been no display. It was considered that the court did not need to ask the opinion of the Constitutional Council for a verdict and required acquittal.

The court gave its verdict on September 11, 2013: rejection of the QPC, which did not have to be referred to the Constitutional Council, and dismissal of the preliminary case. The teacher stated that he was relieved but hoped that his trial had made some progress for freedoms. From the side of APNEL, a review of the priority issue of constitutionality would have been preferred, but the lawyer believed that it could be raised again when another naked hiker was prosecuted for a similar reason.

== Naturism in liberty and the law ==
=== In France ===
Until 1993 the penal code provided for the offence of "Indecent Exposure" that allowed easy suppression of simple nudity.

The new penal code which has since come into force only retains an offence of "Sexual Exhibition" (Article 222-32).

This latter is included in a chapter entitled "Sexual Assaults" which includes rape and other offences (first article of the chapter), other acts of sexual violence, sexual exhibitionism (penultimate section) and finally, sexual harassment.

In the general opinion of naturists, simple nudity on its own can not be considered as a sexual assault. As for the exhibition aspect, it allows the whole body to be seen without highlighting a particular organ to which one might attribute a sexual nature.

However, the problems described above show that in case of a complaint, the people in charge of public authority often think in terms of the old offence of "Indecent Exposure" which is still mentioned in some printed editions of the new penal code.

It is for this reason that APNEL is not content with an "unspoken understanding" in the penal code concerning simple nudity, and it seeks official recognition of its legality.

=== In other countries of Europe ===
Spain is the country of reference for naturists because it recognizes the right to nudity in its constitution. The reasoning relates to the Right to Image that allows everyone to show the self-image he desires. On the other hand, Spanish law provides for punishment of lewd acts, which approximates the sense that the French naturist give to "sexual exhibition". Simply, the Spanish law distinguishes between simple nudity (authorized and deemed not offensive) and the nudity of a sexual nature. Catalonia appears to be the Spanish province that best defends the right to nudity. In particular, the city of Barcelona which authorized nudity in the city.
However, on April 30, 2011, the Barcelona City Council voted a by-law forbidding walking "naked or nearly naked in public spaces" and limiting the wearing of bathing costumes to pools, beaches, adjacent streets and sea-side walks. Since then cases of nudity, very rare in the city, are liable for 300 to 500 euro fines. "This is a ban that over-rides laws that decriminalized nudity twenty-two years ago," says Jacit Ribas i Deix, president of the Association for Defence of the Right to Nudity.

In Navarre, during the protests against bullfighting in Pamplona officially announced as "naked", the authorities imposed (except maybe the first year) the wearing of a slip or a G-string.

In Portugal the right to nudity seems to have increased in recent years.

In Belgium, the situation seems similar to that of France, but the proximity of cities to each other does not facilitate naturism in liberty.

In Germany, being naked in nature does not pose a problem. However, in practice, the Germans use this right mostly for swimming, and much less for forest walks.

In Scandinavian countries, Denmark recognizes the right to nudity on the beaches and the coastal strip. This has not prevented the creation of naturist campsites in this country.

In Sweden, the custom of allemansrätten (the Right of Public Access), dating from the Middle Ages, provides interesting possibilities of life in nature but it did not anticipate the case of naturism. The latter has steadily declined since the 1970s. Wearing a bathing suit is common along the beaches and lakes frequented by the public. If there are instances of nudity, they are discreetly practised. Collective nudity is common in saunas, showers and in swimming pools but in the latter case with separate male and female facilities. It is necessary, however, to wear a bathing costume to swim in the pool, but, as in France, some groups of women claim the right to bare breasts.

In the British Isles, England is fairly tolerant, whereas Scotland considers simple public nudity as a "breach of peace". Hence the legal troubles of Steve Gough previously mentioned.

== See also ==
- Naked hiking
- Naturism

== Notes and references ==
=== Sources ===
This is a translation of the French Wikipedia page about this association.
