= Nakukymppi =

Nude sport event in Finland

Coordinates: 61°20′49.53″N 25°2′52.48″E

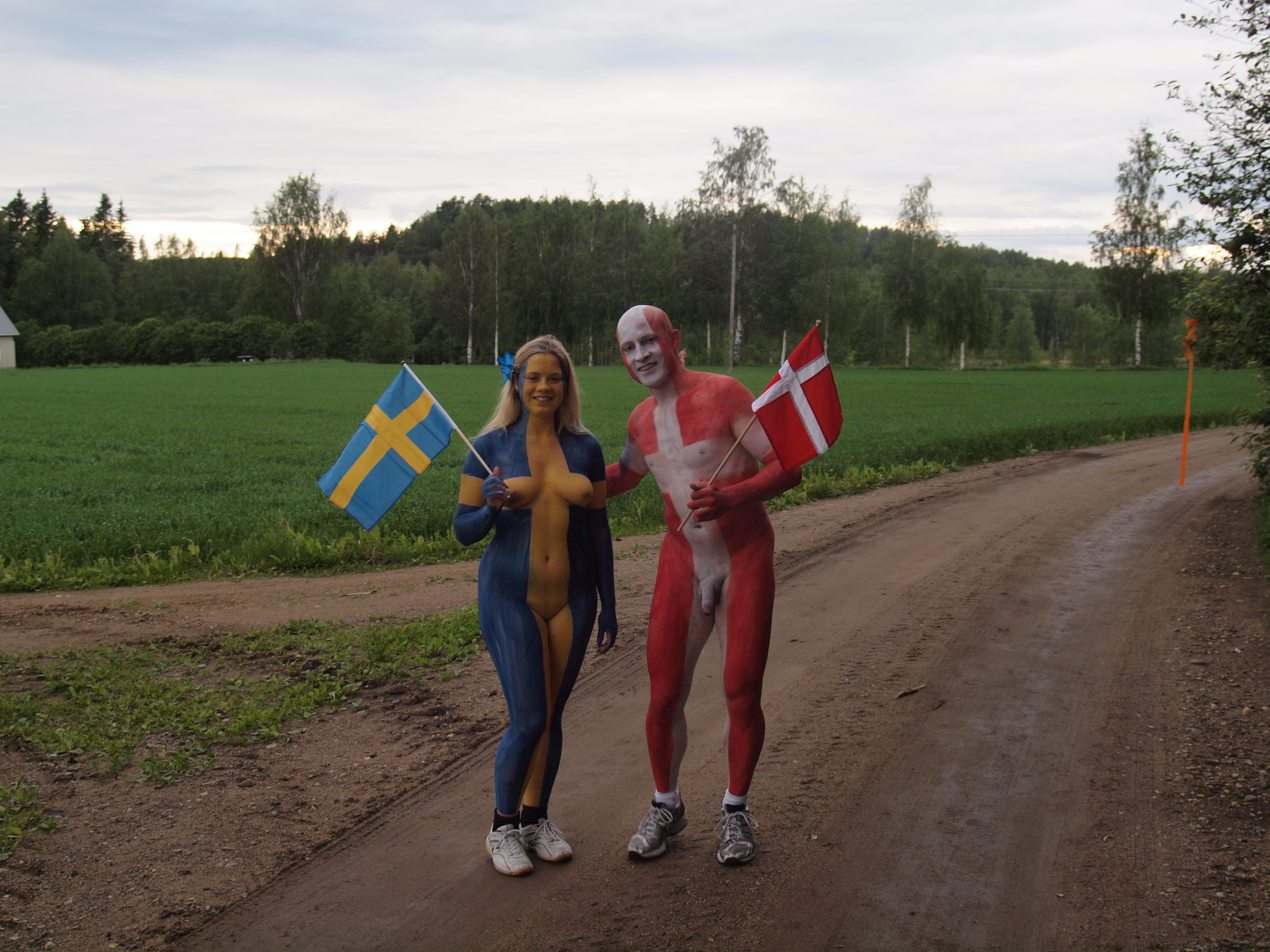
A man and a woman, both wearing only body paint, at the Nakukymppi event. Most participants attend the event fully naked, or wearing only a top.

Nakukymppi is a nude sport event in Finland, held in the municipality of Padasjoki one week before Midsummer every year.

Participants run or walk either 10 kilometres (6 miles) or a full marathon naked. Participants tend to wear only shoes, socks and headwear. Women wear a top if their breasts are shaking too much. It has been held annually since 2003. It usually draws about 100 to 150 participants, of which one-tenth to one-fifth are women. Even though the event isn't organised by naturists and not only for naturists, half of the participants are naturists.

The event is organized by Aarne Heino together with local village community.

== See also ==
- World Naked Bike Ride
- List of clothing-free events
