= Chicago Fun Club =

Non-landed naturist organization in Chicago, Illinois, United States

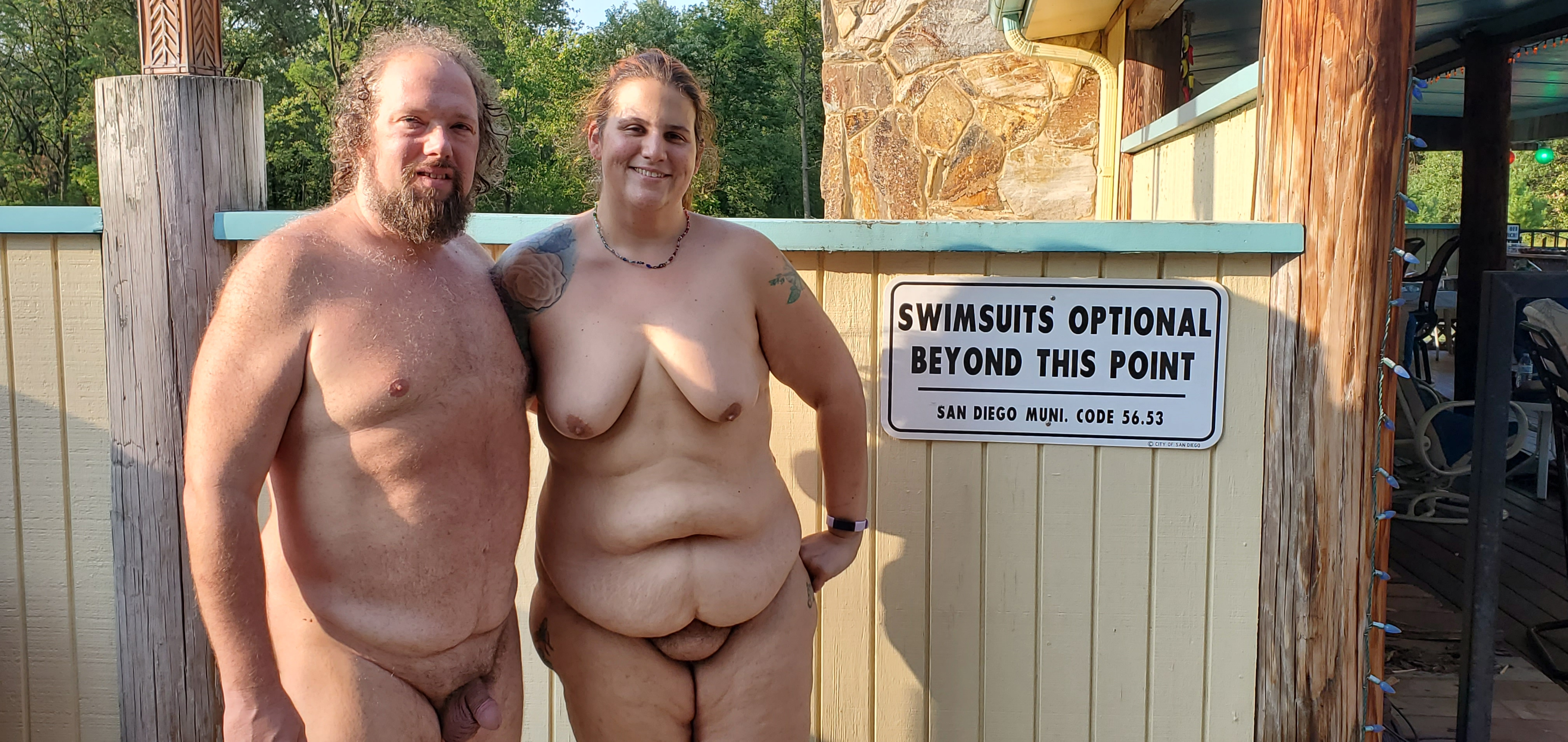

The Chicago Fun Club is a group of adults from all across the Midwest United States who gather together to enjoy the fun of being nude. Their motto is "Couples, singles, gays, straights, men and women enjoying nudism in a non-sexual, social setting. All ages, all body types, no judgements, just fun."

Founded in 2009 by Steve and Katie, the Chicago Fun Club is the largest social nudist club in the Midwest. Members prefer to keep their names anonymous, and therefore use pseudonyms in the news. Based in Chicago, the group holds events 1-2 times per month at locations across the Chicago area. Past events have included Hawaiian themes, Corn Fests, the Olympics, a Wedding Renewal Ceremony, Red, White and Berry and much more. Their most popular event is their annual Halloween party where everyone attending is in costume while also remaining nude.

As a non-landed club, the CFC rents spaces for events. These have included a bowling alley, and a private residence called the "Farm" which includes a hot tub, an outdoor heated in-ground pool, a party room with a deck, a spa, an art gallery and more.

The Chicago Fun Club has been covered in local publications such as Time Out Chicago, Thrillist, Northwestern University Press, and interviewed on local radio.
