= Zevs Cosmos =

Canadian social nudity activist

Zevs Cosmos (also found as Zeus) (born Esyedepeea Aesfyza) is a Canadian social nudity activist and the founder of the Nudist Christian Church of the Blessed Virgin Jesus (NCCBVJ).

== Early activism ==
"Zevs Cosmos" appeared at Iowa State University around 1982, often preaching on central campus, sometimes drawing crowds away from "Brother Jed Smock", another traveling evangelistic preacher who also made regular appearances on campus. During this time, Cosmos would often be seen teaching his ideas about nudism on street corners in Ames, Iowa City, and Des Moines, Iowa. He referred to himself as the "founder and bishop" of the Nudist Christian Church of the Blessed Virgin Jesus. By the end of 1984, he claimed to have attracted 50 followers in Ames.

== Nudist Christian Church of the Blessed Virgin Jesus ==
=== Early events ===
Cosmos was referring to himself as the bishop of the NCCBVJ as early as November 1984. In 1985, Cosmos said that God commanded him to travel to the Utah–Arizona border; while in this area, Cosmos says that God and an angel named Ephygeneia appeared to him naked and told him to go to a cave on a nearby ridge. While in the cave, God and the angel appeared again and gave Cosmos a revelation, which Cosmos recorded and named the Book of Zevs (also found as the Book of Zeus). The NCCBVJ teaches that the Book of Zevs is scripture that adds to and complements the Bible.

=== Teachings ===
==== Book of Zevs ====
The Book of Zevs instructs Cosmos to build a nudist community city called "Cosmos", which was to be situated northwest of the Grand Canyon. The book also condemns Mormon fundamentalists near the Utah–Arizona border for their practice of plural marriage and their belief in the inferiority of black people.

==== Other teachings ====
The NCCBVJ teaches that nudity is a foundational state of being for leading a good life. It teaches that problems with sexuality, body image, pornography, and crime would all be solved if society would adopt a nudist lifestyle. Cosmos and the church have also led protests against female genital mutilation and male circumcision, which are viewed as equally undesirable.

== Legal incidents ==
In January 1985, Cosmos was investigated by the American Immigration and Naturalization Service authorities after complaints were made of Cosmos's preaching and sale of pro-nudity bumper stickers and T-shirts on street corners in Ames, Iowa. When it was discovered that Cosmos had exceeded the 6-month stay permitted by his visitor's visa, he was ordered deported to Canada. His appeal to a federal immigration judge was rejected and he was flown to Winnipeg, Manitoba.

On 31 October 1985 Cosmos was stopped by police as he was placing flyers on car windshields near Drake University in Des Moines. The police told him that a city ordinance forbade the distribution of literature in this manner. In December 1985, the Iowa Civil Liberties Union filed suit in the United States District Court for the Southern District of Iowa on behalf of Cosmos, arguing that the ordinance unreasonably limited Cosmos's right to freedom of speech.

In August 2002, police in Washington, D.C. alleged that Cosmos had vandalized the National Mall and President's Park with swastikas and Nazi SS symbols during the American Independence Day weekend in 1999.

On 21 April 2006, Cosmos was arrested in Colorado City, Arizona and charged with being a public nuisance. The police reported that he had been leaving flyers containing nude photographs of himself in residents' mailboxes.
