= Stephen Gough =

British activist and Royal Marine

- Born: Stephen Peter Gough; 13 May 1959 (age 66); Southampton, England
- Other names: Naked Rambler
- Occupations: Activist, ex-lorry driver, former Royal Marine
- Known for: Walking naked across Great Britain

Stephen Peter Gough (born 13 May 1959), popularly known as the "Naked Rambler", is a British pro-nudity activist and former Royal Marine. In 2003 and 2004, he walked the length of Great Britain naked, but was arrested when he did it again in 2005 and 2006. Since then, he has spent most of the intervening years in prison, having been repeatedly rearrested for contempt of court for public nudity and imprisoned. He has been convicted of public order offences at least 40 times. Gough brought a lawsuit in the European Court for Human Rights, arguing that laws requiring him to wear clothing violated his rights to privacy and free expression. His claim was rejected in 2014.

== Early life ==
Stephen Peter Gough was born on 13 May 1959 in Southampton, Hampshire, to Nora Evelyn Gough (née Cooper, 1926–2017) and carpenter Kenneth Gough (1924–1999). He has six siblings.

== Naked rambling and activism ==
Gough, an ex-lorry driver and former Royal Marine, is from Eastleigh, Hampshire, and is known for walking the length of Great Britain from Land's End to John o' Groats over 2003 and 2004 wearing only boots, socks, a rucksack and a hat. He was arrested and imprisoned on numerous occasions during the course of his ramble.

In 2000, Gough moved to Vancouver, Canada, for a year with his then-partner Alison Ward and their two children. One day, he went for a walk when he had an epiphany. In an interview, Gough explained his sentiments: "I realised I was good. Being British, buried in our upbringing is that we're not good or have to watch ourselves – maybe it comes from religion, or school. I realised that at a fundamental level I'm good, we're all good, and you can trust that one part of yourself." He concluded that if he was good, then his body was good. This self-realisation led to him frequently appearing naked in public. Ward explained: "[Gough] has talked since about having an epiphany, but it’s not something I understand. He went to Canada one man and turned into someone else."

Upon his return to Hampshire, Gough had an intense appreciation of what nakedness could offer. He said he questioned "things we're taught to believe are right". He visited an Eastleigh police station and asked if it was illegal to walk naked in the street. Gough claimed that the police "couldn't come up with an answer".

In January 2003, Gough embarked on his first naked walk in England. He headed from his mother's Hampshire home to Eastleigh town centre.

His second Land's End to John o' Groats ramble was in 2005 and 2006 and accompanied by his girlfriend Melanie Roberts (born 1971 or 1972). It was the subject of Richard Macer's BBC1 documentary, One Life: The Naked Rambler (2005). He was arrested twice in England, but was almost immediately released. Upon entering Scotland, he was arrested several times, including an arrest for contempt of court after he appeared naked before a judge. His website claimed that ordering him to wear clothes for his court appearance "breached Article 6 of the European Convention on Human Rights" – Right to a Fair Trial. He claimed that Articles 3 and 5 to 11 had been repeatedly breached by the authorities since he and Melanie had arrived in Scotland. He served a three-month sentence in Saughton Prison. The walk was resumed on 12 February 2006, and was completed shortly after on Monday 20 February the same year. The Guardian newspaper congratulated the couple on completing their journey, stating that they were practising gymnosophy in the tradition of people such as George Bernard Shaw.

Gough was involved with the public nudity advocacy group The Freedom to be Yourself.

Gough was arrested again on 19 May 2006 at Edinburgh Airport after removing his clothes during a flight from Southampton to Edinburgh and refusing to get dressed. On 25 August 2006, he was given a seven-month jail sentence. On 9 April 2007, Gough was cleared of charges related to his refusal to dress upon being released into Saughton Prison car park in Edinburgh. The ruling judge, Isobel Poole, found that there was no evidence of "actual alarm or disturbance", adding "I can understand this conduct could be considered unpleasant to passers-by had there been any but there is a lack of evidence to that effect." In November 2007, Gough lost his appeal against contempt of court convictions for refusing to wear clothes during his 2005 trial and had another 3 months added to his sentence.

In January 2008, after spending most of the previous 20 months in jail (being rearrested for nudity each time he was released and each time he appeared in court), Gough was released and told that if he went for three months without appearing naked in public he would not be returned to jail for outstanding convictions; two hours later he left the court naked and was immediately re-arrested and subsequently returned to jail. Gough served his time in Barlinnie Prison and was released on 14 October 2008, when he was again immediately arrested for leaving the prison naked. On 14 November, he was cleared of that offence on the grounds of insufficient evidence, but appeared in the dock naked and was rearrested in the foyer of Glasgow Sheriff Court. On 18 December, he was convicted of a breach of the peace and sentenced to a further 12 months.

In July 2009, Gough, once again standing in the dock naked, was jailed at Perth for a further 12 months for breach of the peace. Sheriff MacFarlane was told that the bill for dealing with Gough had cost the public an estimated several hundred thousand pounds. The court heard how Gough had finished a previous jail term at Perth Prison and was released to enjoy freedom for the first time in several months. His freedom lasted less than 30 seconds after he walked naked from the prison door to Edinburgh Road. Gough was also sentenced to four months for refusing to dress before the trial.

While in jail in Perth, on 6 July 2009, Stephen Gough received a visit from two members of the French Association pour la promotion du naturisme en liberté (Association for the Promotion of Naturism in Liberty), which is tracking his activities. On 8 February 2010, Gough was convicted of breach of the peace and contempt of court, charges relating to walking naked in Perth and appearing naked in court. He was sentenced to 21 months' imprisonment, his longest sentence to date.

On 25 November 2010, he was found guilty of conducting himself in a disorderly manner, standing naked at the gates of Perth Prison, refusing to wear any clothing or otherwise cover his genitals and committing a breach of the peace. He was assessed by Dr Gary Macpherson, a Scottish consultant forensic clinical psychologist. Dr Macpherson found no evidence of any mental disorder. He was sentenced to 15 months and 26 days. He is understood to have spent his time in prison in solitary confinement. He was released on 20 July 2011, but immediately rearrested after leaving the prison naked, and received another 657-day sentence.

When his sentence concluded on 17 July 2012, Gough left the prison naked again, but this time the police allowed him to go on his way. Three days later, on 20 July, he was rearrested by Fife Police for a breach of the peace in Townhill.

On 13 September 2012, he was sentenced to five months in prison. He had refused to allow social workers to assess his mental health after he broke down in court during an appearance on 23 August.

Released in early October 2012, he walked from Saughton to Edale, Derbyshire during October, continuing across the English border down the Pennine Way to Edale by 31 October, with two arrests en route in Hebden Bridge and Halifax. Released on bail, he continued to walk south and was due back in Court on 5 February 2013 to face public order charges. He was arrested in Carterton, Oxfordshire, on suspicion of outraging public decency on 4 December and was then refused bail and spent Christmas 2012 in jail after his application for bail was refused.

In 2012, Gough won the Nicolás Salmerón Human Rights Award from the Spanish human rights group, Fundación Internacional de Derechos Humanos.

On 19 June 2013, Gough was imprisoned for 11 months for breaching an antisocial behaviour order (ASBO) on 28 February minutes after it was granted, having recently returned home. Gough was not allowed to appear in court as he refused to wear clothes. In January 2014, he was again jailed for breaching his ASBO; this time, he was sentenced to 16 months' imprisonment. On his release from Winchester Prison, he walked out wearing only footwear (once again breaching the ASBO). In October 2014, he was sentenced to a further two and a half years in prison.

Gough challenged U.K. laws on public nudity in the European Court of Human Rights, claiming that such laws violated his right to privacy and free expression. On 28 October 2014, the Court ruled that European laws protecting privacy and freedom of expression did not protect Gough's naked rambling.

On 14 August 2015, Gough was released from Winchester prison. At around 6:30am, he got into a car inside the prison grounds and was transported from Winchester to Sussex. On his release from prison, The Sunday Times described him as a previous "prisoner of conscience".

In April 2016, Gough asserted that he had cut back on his public nudity because he was responsible for caring for his then 89-year-old mother Nora, who had dementia. Nora died on 14 January 2017, aged 90.

== Who Bares Wins ==
A comedic theatrical production invoking Gough's initial naked ramble of 2003–2004 titled Who Bares Wins was produced by Scottish theatre company Right Lines Productions in 2004. The play, written by Euan Martin and Dave Smith and directed by Mark Saunders, followed the Rambler on his journey through the Scottish countryside and his numerous stints in Scottish prisons.

Set against the backdrop of a remote community eagerly awaiting the arrival of the Rambler for its own reasons, Who Bares Wins explores society's wide range of attitudes to nudity. The play, starring Ron Emslie and Alyth McCormack, toured Scotland and was seen by Gough himself, without clothes on, at The Universal Hall, Findhorn, in 2004.

== Personal life ==
Gough had a partner, Alison Ward. Gough and Ward separated in the 2000s. By November 2005, Gough had a new partner, Melanie Roberts.

== See also ==
- Andrew Martinez
- Clothes free organizations
- Naked hiking
- Naturism
- Streaking
- Timeline of significant non-sexualized public nudity activities
