= Simon Oosterman =

New Zealand political activist (born 1980)

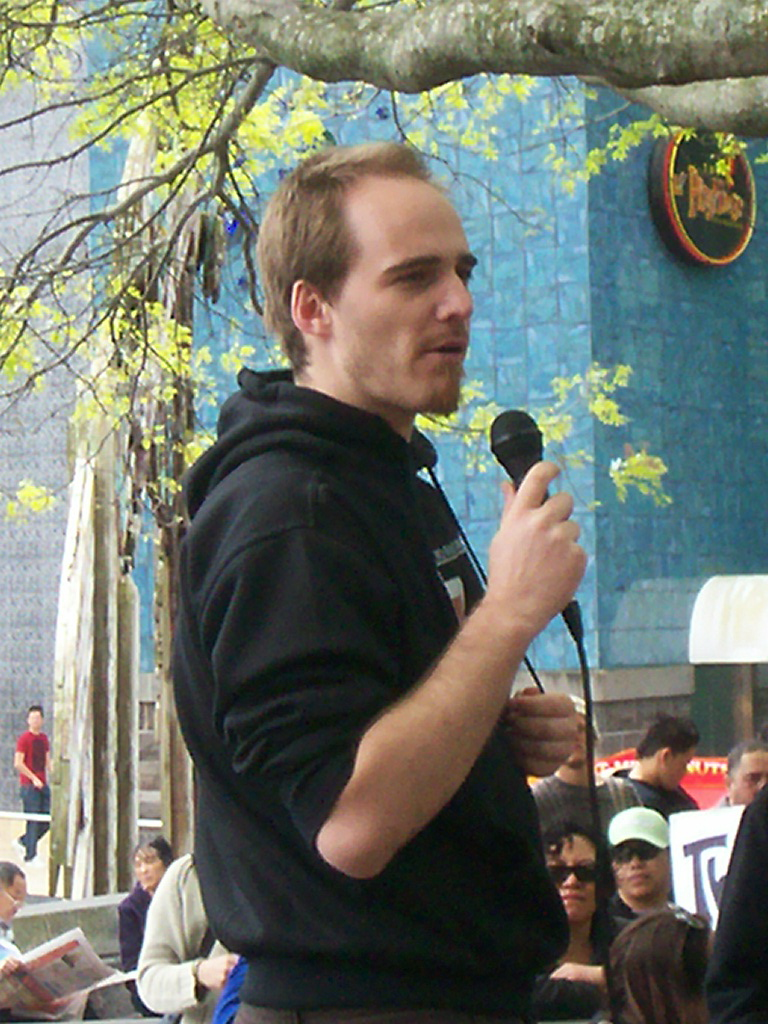
- Simon Oosterman speaking at an Auckland protest against the 2007 New Zealand anti-terror raids
- Born: 1980 (age 45–46); New Zealand
- Known for: Social and political activism

Simon Oosterman is a New Zealand political activist, trade unionist, and syndicalist. He is best known for coordinating the Unite Union campaign 'Supersizemypay.com', which targeted the fast food industry and advocated for the abolition of youth rates and for a $12 minimum wage, and the world's first Starbucks strike, and for his involvement in the World Naked Bike Ride, on which he was arrested for indecent exposure.

He also previously worked as a media liaison in Auckland for the National Distribution Union and the ShelfRespect.org supermarket pay campaign.

== Early years ==
Oosterman grew up in Ramarama, an area south of Drury, and on a farm in Rerewhakaaitu, south of Rotorua. Simon and his siblings (twin brother Paul, older brother Jonathan, and sister Kate) were put through private schools by their mother Allison, a journalist and now lecturer of communications at AUT University in Auckland. She told Metro magazine that she wanted the best education for them and "remarkably" was able to send them to King's School (Jonathan), Southwell School (Paul & Simon), King's College (Jonathan, Paul, & Simon) and St Cuthbert's College (Kate), despite being on her own after she and her husband separated when the twins were nine months old.

Oosterman studied for a bachelor's in sociology and women's studies but pulled out of a master's in environmental sociology to join an anti-war protest.

== Activism ==
He has been a prominent animal rights and anti-genetic engineering activist, and has been involved in climate change issues. Oosterman is credited with organising the 'Supersizemypay.com' campaign for the world's first Starbucks strike, as well as coining the name and designing its website.

Oosterman's first public protest was in 2003 with a week-long sit-in in downtown Auckland outside the US embassy. He, his brother Jonathan, and other activists, were protesting US actions in Iraq. That same year he was involved in an anti-vivisection protest in Christchurch where he lay in front of a bus carrying scientists. He was arrested but received diversion because this was a first offence.

In February 2005, Oosterman received worldwide attention when he was arrested at the start of the Auckland World Naked Bike Ride for refusing to put on underwear. He was covered in thick blue body-paint at the time. In court he pleaded not guilty to the charge of indecent exposure. To protest this charge, he stripped off in front of the courthouse with three other activists wrapped in a banner reading "STOP indecent exposure to vehicle emissions". He then ran into the court naked, but put his clothes back on for the plea hearing. The charges were later dropped due to lack of evidence.

On 22 March 2005, he and other protesters publicly complained about police brutality while passively resisting arrest for obstructing a footpath, following a peace demonstration that went inside an ANZ bank. In May 2006 he filed papers at the Auckland district court seeking NZ$50,000 in damages from the New Zealand police after being pepper sprayed at a January 2005 protest against an alleged genetic engineering experiment outside the Forest Research Institute in Rotorua. On 2 July 2008, Judge Chris McGuire awarded Oosterman $5,000 damages and $25,000 court costs, saying police actions had not been reasonable, but rejected Oosterman's claim of assault saying the officer's actions did not quite meet the necessary "high threshold of blameworthiness".

In July 2007, Oosterman, who runs a web hosting service for community groups, was forced to remove a Save Happy Valley Coalition spoof annual report of Solid Energy's environmental record, which included a logo of the state-owned enterprise, due to infringement of their copyright and trademark.

He was involved in a 2007 protest in support of Iranian hunger striker Ali Panah at Mount Eden Prison, during which he was arrested.

In 2008, he was identified as an anarchist after he enrolled to vote in the 2008 New Zealand election.

== See also ==
- World Naked Bike Ride
- National Distribution Union
- Anarchism in New Zealand
