= Starkers! =

Naked club night in London, England

Coordinates: 51.4871°N 0.1222°W

Starkers! is a monthly naked club night held at various pubs and nightclubs in London from 2003 onwards. It identifies itself as the first and only regular club night of its kind in England not segregated by gender and open to adults of all ages and sexual orientations. The dress code stipulates that both men and women undress except for footwear, required for safety. The undress code extends to staff members who identify as nudists.

The concept of Starkers! emerged from the underground fetish and swinger scenes of East London in late 2003, when a nude barman at such an establishment launched the event after suggestions from co-workers and club patrons. An early event was featured in an edition of H&E naturist magazine in 2004. Later in 2004, the event moved to a pub near Columbia Road in Bethnal Green, where it rapidly gained a following among the gay community. After police prevented the club continuing at its then home, Starkers! relocated to a nightclub in Vauxhall. In summer 2006, the event moved to a venue close to London Bridge, where it entertained up to 400 naked clubbers every month. In 2007 the event was again forced to close, after a Scottish newspaper story.

Starkers! moved to a lap dancing venue in Shoreditch in late 2007, where it remained for several months. In summer 2008, the club relocated to Vauxhall, where it remained until late 2010. Between 2012 and 2014 the club was in Dalston.

The club was closed from 2014 until 2023, when it re-opened at a venue close to Kings Cross underground station. Many of the club's patrons had lamented the lack of options, particularly after the coronavirus pandemic, which had seen many events like this close permanently.

Starkers! came second in Club of the Year in the 2006 Erotic Awards.
