= Nude recreation =

Leisure activity while naked

Nude beach volleyballers on Sylt, Germany

Nude recreation consists of recreational activities which some people engage in while nude. Historically, the ancient Olympic Games were nude events. Some societies in Africa, Oceania, and South America still engage in everyday public activities—including sports—without wearing clothes, while in most of the world nude activities take place in either private spaces or separate clothing optional areas in public spaces. Occasional events, such as nude bike rides, may occur in public areas where nudity is not otherwise allowed.

While nude recreational activities may include sports such as tennis or volleyball, nude sporting activities are usually recreational rather than competitive or organized.

== History and terminology ==
Recreation is any human activity done for pleasure (or "play") during leisure time as opposed to those activities that are necessary for survival. Historically, this means that recreation was explored more deeply (recreation being something most animals engage in passively) after human society reached the stage where more leisure time could be afforded, perhaps during the late Stone Age (Upper Paleolithic), as shown by the first appearance of cave paintings and musical instruments.

Modern concepts of recreation begin with ancient civilizations. Sport is any activity recognized as requiring physical skill. Any sport may be recreational for the participants, while viewing sports is a recreation for spectators.

== Naturist/nudist recreation ==
Naturism, or nudism, is a cultural movement practicing, advocating, and defending personal and social nudity, most but not all of which takes place on private property. The term also refers to a lifestyle based on personal, family, or social nudity. Research indicates that contrary to public opinion, naturists are otherwise typical members of society who engage in social activities such as volleyball, swimming, and tennis in the same manner as at other resorts, just without the clothing.

In keeping with their basic function, naturist clubs and resorts feature recreational activities. Naturist recreation also includes cruise ships, which offer a variety of activities.

Naturist venues also host special events, such as New Year's Eve parties. Florida Young Naturists organizes seasonal "bashes" at several Florida nudist/naturist clubs and resorts.

Nude volleyball is a recreational activity that has been offered at many naturist clubs (see § Volleyball below).

=== World Naked Gardening Day ===
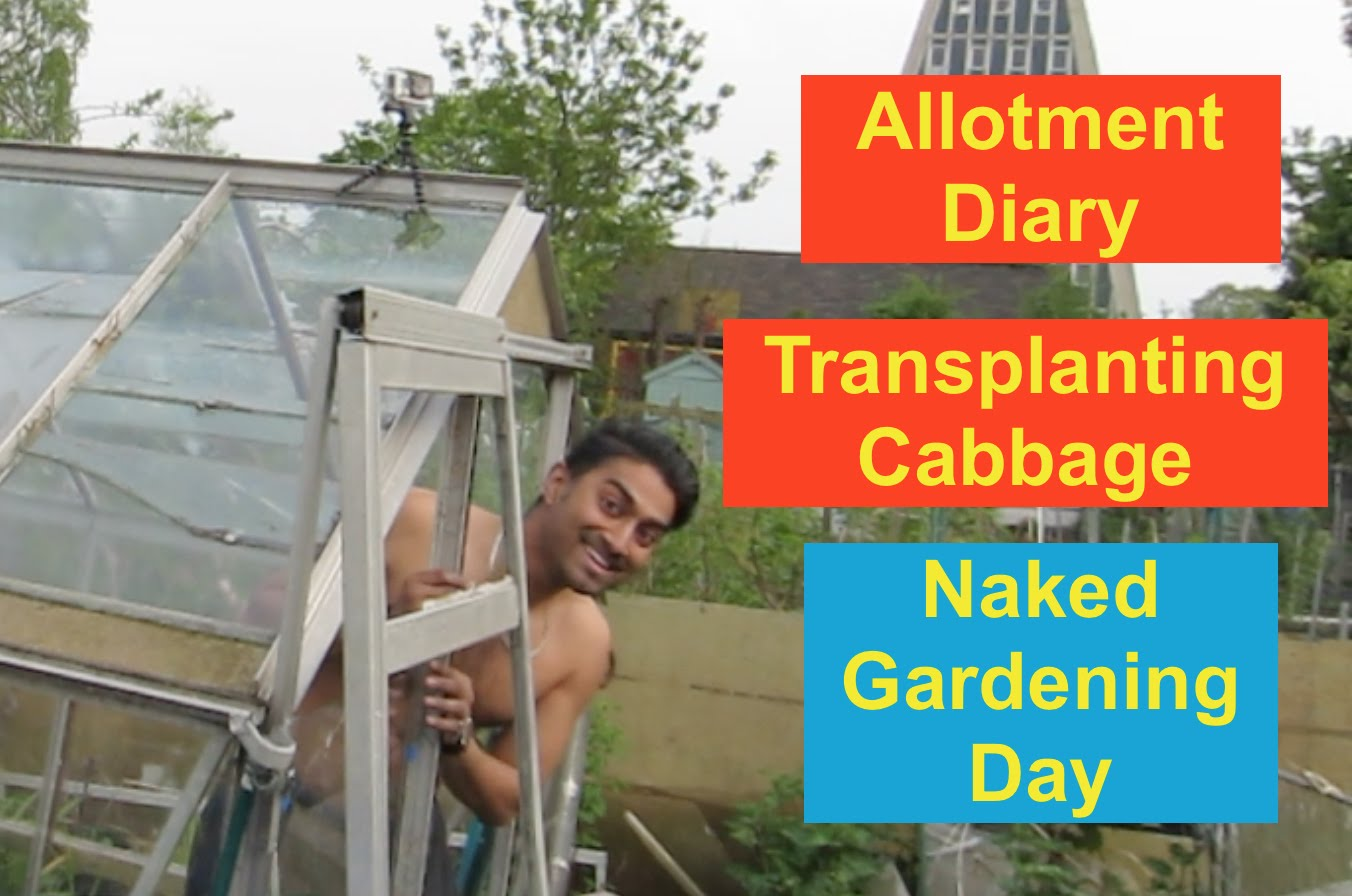
A graphic for a gardening video celebrating World Naked Gardening Day in 2016

People across the globe are encouraged on World Naked Gardening Day (WNGD), held in May each year, to tend their gardens in the nude. WNGD was organized by the Body Freedom Collaborative. Since May is a cold month in New Zealand, the New Zealand Naturist Federation has instituted a National Nude Gardening Day in October.

== Clothing optional recreation ==
Some nude or "clothing optional" recreation occurs in public spaces as occasional exceptions to social norms.

=== Beaches ===
Clothing optional beaches in the United States vary in the degree to which they are separated from the non-nude public, and whether nudity is officially permitted by local authorities or merely tolerated although illegal. In the Miami metropolitan area, the clothing optional section of Haulover Park is marked only by signs, and is sanctioned and maintained by Miami-Dade County. The beach features food, beach chair, and umbrella concessions; and showers. In contrast, several California state beaches with clothing optional areas are isolated by steep cliffs and have no facilities outside the parking areas. The long-standing tradition of nudity on these beaches is tolerated. These include Gray Whale Cove State Beach near Pacifica, California, and Black's Beach in San Diego.

In some European countries, such as Denmark and Sweden all beaches are clothing optional. Beaches in some holiday destinations, such as Crete, are also clothing-optional, except some central urban beaches. There are two centrally located clothes-optional beaches in Barcelona.

In a survey by The Daily Telegraph, Germans and Austrians were most likely to have visited a nude beach (28%), followed by Norwegians (18%), Spaniards (17%), Australians (17%), and New Zealanders (16%). Of the nationalities surveyed, the Japanese (2%) were the least likely to have visited a nude beach. This result may indicate the lack of nude beaches in Japan; however, the Japanese are open with regard to family bathing nude at home and at onsen (hot springs).

=== Bicycling ===
A clothing-optional bike ride is a cycling event in which nudity is permitted or expected. There are many clothing-optional cycling events around the world. Some rides are political, recreational, artistic or a unique combination. Some are used to promote topfreedom, a social movement to accord women and girls the right to be topless in public where men and boys have that right. Many of the political rides have their roots from Critical Mass and are often described or categorized as a form of political protest, street theatre, party-on-wheels, streaking, public nudity and clothing-optional recreation; thus, they attract a wide range of participants.

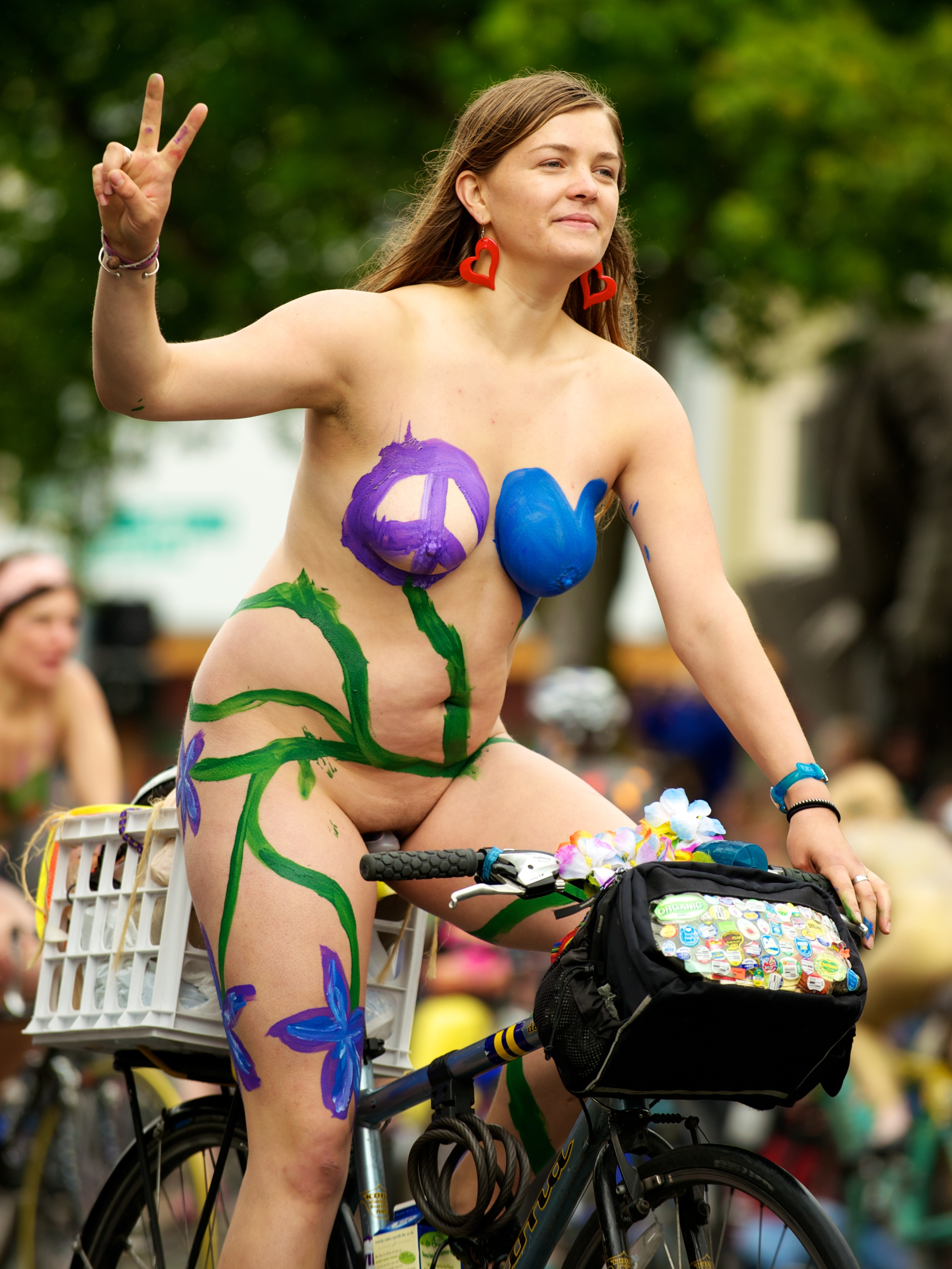
Nude cyclist at 2010 Fremont Solstice Parade

The Solstice Cyclists (also known as The Painted [Naked] Cyclists of the Solstice Parade, or The Painted Cyclists) is an artistic, non-political, clothing-optional bike ride celebrating the Summer Solstice. It is the unofficial start of the Summer Solstice Parade & Pageant since 1992, an event produced by the Fremont Arts Council in the Fremont district of Seattle.

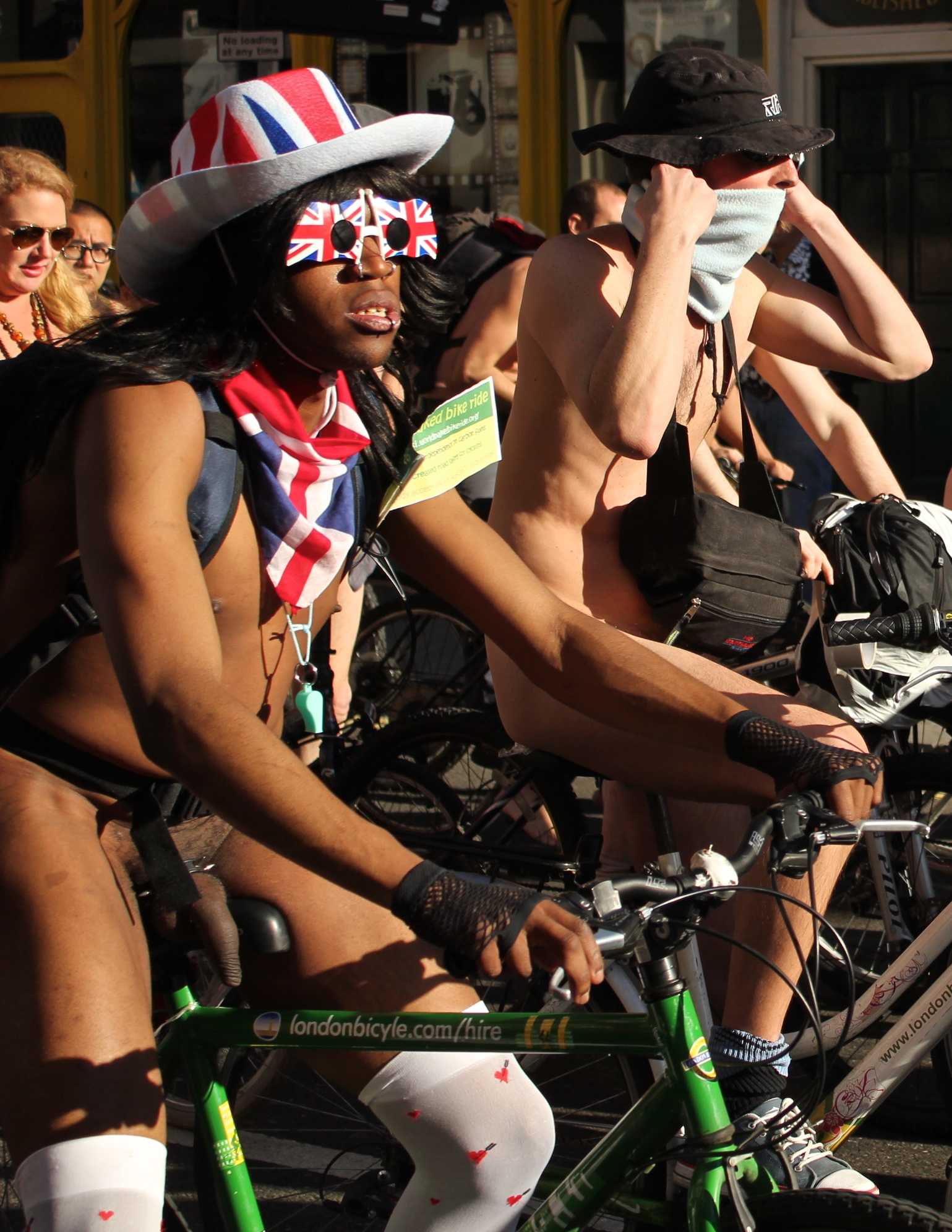
WNBR riders in London (2012)

World Naked Bike Rides (WNBRs) are annual clothing-optional bike rides in which each city's participants plan, meet and ride en masse on human-powered transport to "deliver a vision of a cleaner, safer, body-positive world" by attracting attention to a healthy alternative for vehicles that depend on fossil fuels; the naked body is used as a symbol for the vulnerability of humans to pollution, and of cyclists to the vehicular traffic in cities. WNBRs have taken place all over the world since 2004 involving thousands of people. These take place in mostly western cities, where cyclists ride either partially or totally nude in a light-hearted attempt to draw attention to the danger of depending on fossil fuels. Some commend the World Naked Bike Rides for their visible expression of the effort to promote healthier transport modes, including walking, cycling and public transport, which have been a mainstay of green-alternative politics for decades.

=== Body painting ===
Body art (such as body painting) is a common form of creative expression used to promote body freedom, and is often a part of other clothing optional events. Because the body is technically covered, if completed in private, full body painting does not violate laws against public nudity, leaving the police to make case by case decisions based upon other laws.

An arts collective in Bushwick, Brooklyn has celebrated a Bodypainting Day annually since 2014, with 45 models and 25 artists participating in 2019.

=== Bowling ===
Nude bowling offers naturists a chance to enjoy indoor recreation during cold weather or in locations where outdoor opportunities are limited. These activities are usually held in commercial bowling alleys willing to rent their facility to nudist groups for a period of time to restrict participation to just the members of the group.

=== Bungee jumping ===
When A. J. Hackett opened the world's first commercial bungee jumping site at Kawarau Bridge near Queenstown, New Zealand, customers who performed the jump in the nude were granted free entry. This offer was later withdrawn because too many jumpers were taking advantage of it, but the site remains clothing-optional. Billy Connolly famously bungee-jumped nude from the bridge during his 2004 World Tour of New Zealand.

Since 2006 there has been an annual naked bungee jump at WildPlay park on Vancouver Island as a fund raiser for the Victoria Branch of BC Schizophrenia Society. The 2019 event drew more than 100 participants.

=== Hiking ===
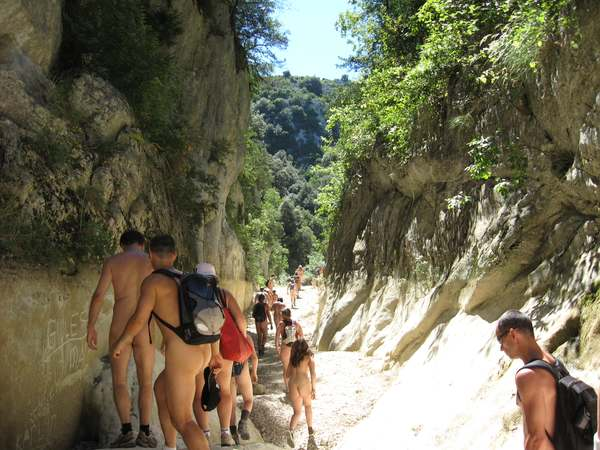
Nude hiking in France (2008)

Nude hiking, also known as naked walking or freehiking, is a sub-category of the modern form of social nudity.

Neither nude hiking nor skinny-dipping are expressly prohibited by the US Forest Service, which instead applies laws against disorderly conduct as necessary.

In the United Kingdom, Stephen Gough, known as The Naked Rambler, received much media coverage for walking naked from Land's End to John o' Groats in 2003–2004 and again in 2005–2006.

Conversely to Gough's experiences, in 2005 and 2006 the European Alps were crossed naked during a one-week hiking tour, and there was little media coverage. No one was arrested or troubled, and there was no police involvement. Most naked hikers report friendly reactions from people they meet.

Some jurisdictions have regulations formally prohibiting nude hiking, and can impose fines or other punishments. A local bylaw to this effect was adopted, for example, by the 2009 General Meeting (Landsgemeinde) of the residents of the Swiss canton Appenzell Innerrhoden. In nearby Appenzell Ausserrhoden, the court of second instance "Obergericht" reinforced an unpaid fine of 100 Swiss francs for naked hiking and added the court's cost of another 3330 Swiss Francs.

=== Museum tours ===
In February 2013, the Leopold Museum of Vienna opened its doors to nude museum goers for an exhibit entitled "Nude Men from 1800 to Today". More than sixty visitors attended in the nude. In June 2013, the Portland Art Museum in Oregon admitted nude participants prior to the nighttime World Naked Bike Ride for a special exhibit called "Cyclepedia" on the art of bicycle design. Hundreds of patrons saw the exhibit in the nude.

=== Parks ===
Two sections of the "English Gardens" in Munich, Schönfeldwiese and Schwabingerbach are officially designated as clothing optional, although nude sunbathing may be found in other locations. There are three clothing optional areas on the Isar River, and at the Feldmochinger See. Berlin also has a number of nude sunbathing areas. A section of Bois de Vincennes in Paris has, since 2017, been designated for naturists and is open from April to October. To recognize its third anniversary, a naturist picnic was held in June, 2019.

=== Parties ===
A number of colleges and universities have a tradition of nude parties, often as experiments in social interaction that run counter to the perfect bodies seen in the media. The Pundits at Yale has been throwing naked parties since 1995. At Brown the party is hosted by an off-campus housing cooperative, and at Wellesley it is a charity event for which the administration provides security. At other institutions such as Wesleyan, Columbia, MIT, Bowdoin and Amherst the parties may be more impromptu events in dorms or off-campus.

=== Restaurant dining ===
There have been a number of restaurants (commonly referred to as nude, naked or clothing-free restaurants) where diners were legally at liberty to be nude.

The Amrita restaurant in Japan, now closed, had strict rules of entry for its naked party. Other nude restaurants have included The Bunyadi in London, Innato on the Canary Island of Tenerife, and L'Italo Americano in Milan, all of which also closed. O'naturel was Paris, France's first naked restaurant, located in the 12th arrondissement. The restaurant opened in November 2017 and served French cuisine. In January 2019, sibling owners Mike and Stéphane Saada announced plans to end operations in February 2019.

There are a number of bars and restaurants directly accessible from the clothing-optional beach at Orient Bay, Saint Martin, in the Caribbean, which allow varying degrees of nudity. Although essentially wiped out in 2017 by Hurricane Irma, they are slowly being rebuilt.

=== Social dancing ===
An invitation-only event with naked Tango Milonga dancing was held in a small town in Germany. Starkers!, a monthly naked club night, was held in London from 2003 onwards. Many bars, nightclubs, and discotheques in Seattle relaxed their rules or started hosting topless and clothing-optional events in the 2020s. After gay bars were threatened by police for allowing nipples, pro-nudity protests resulted in the 2024 announcement that nudity regulations would not be enforced by the liquor and cannabis board. Historic gay bar Cuff Complex stated "Effective immediately: guests are free to be themselves." immediately after the policy change.

=== Yoga ===
Traditionally practiced with a minimum of clothing, coed nude yoga has been introduced in London, Boston, New York City and Seattle.

== Nudity at festivals ==
Woodstock in 1969 was the first example of widespread, spontaneous nudity at a music festival. The Nambassa festivals held in New Zealand in the 1970s continued this phenomenon. Of the 75,000 patrons who attended the 1979 Nambassa three-day counterculture festival, an estimated 35% chose to remove their clothing, preferring complete or partial nudity. In the 21st century, music festivals such as Coachella have returned to being outdoor concerts whose attendees tend toward costumes rather than nudity, however there may be the occasional nude event. "The Meredith Gift" is a nude running race at the Meredith Music Festival near the town of Meredith in Victoria, Australia.

While including music, Burning Man is a more diverse arts and culture event where "camps" range from non-sexual nudity to overtly sexually themed nudity. Since 2004 there has been a naked bike ride known as the "Naked Pub Crawl". The Folsom Street Fair held in San Francisco is a leather and BDSM-themed fair. Nudist festivals are held to celebrate particular days of the year, and in many such events nude bodypainting is also common, such as Neptune Day Festival held in Koktebel, Crimea to depict mythological events.

Organized by the Federación Nudista de México (Mexican Nudist Federation) since 2016 when Zipolite beach nudity was legalized, Festival Nudista Zipolite occurs annually on the first weekend of February.

British Naturism hosts a number of festivals every year, where participants spend the entire time naked. The largest of these, Nudefest, was founded in 2007 and sees hundreds of attendees every year gathering for live music, dancing, and other naked events.

In Israel there is an area for public nudity in several festivals such as Boombamela, Bereshit, and Shantipi. The largest naturist festival that is dedicated to public nudity is the Pashut desert festival, that takes places twice a year and is open also to tourists, although most of the participants are locals.

== Nudity in sports ==
=== History ===
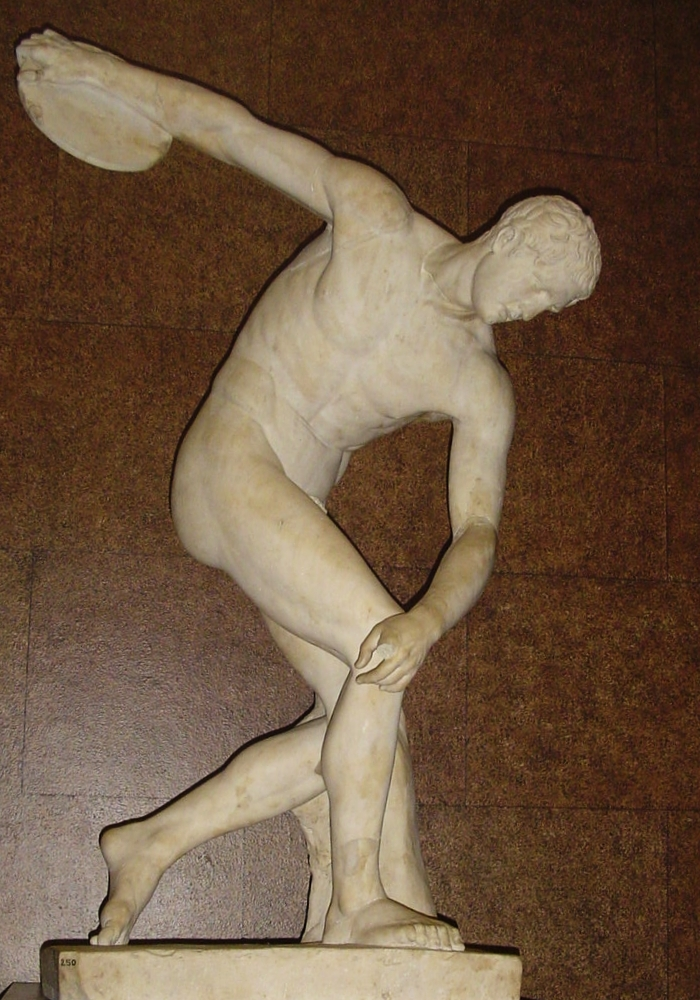
The famous Discobolus of Myron

It was a norm in Ancient Greece for athletes to exercise and compete in the nude. The Greek practice to compete and exercise was strongly inspired by their gods and heroes. For the gods and heroes nudity was a part of their identity and a way to display their physical energy and power which the athletes attempted to honour and emulate. Athletes from Greece and from Greek colonies came together for the Olympic Games and the other Panhellenic Games. They competed nude in almost all disciplines with the exception of chariot races, although there are depictions of nude chariot racers.

The word gymnasium (Latin; from Greek gymnasion, being derived from Greek gymnos, meaning "naked" or "nude"), originally denoted a place for socializing and engaging in both intellectual education and physical pursuits, training facility for competitors in public sports, and physical education of young men as future soldiers and (certainly in democracies) citizens (compare ephebos), is another testimony of nudity in physical exercises said to encourage aesthetic appreciation of the body. In some countries including Germany the word is still used for higher secondary school education. The more recent form gym is an abbreviation of gymnasium.

In Japan, female sumo wrestlers sometimes competed in the nude as a prayer for rain.

=== Tropical cultures ===
Many indigenous peoples in Africa and South America train and compete in sport competitions naked. Nuba peoples in South Sudan and Xingu tribes in the Amazon basin region in Brazil, for example, wrestle naked, whereas Dinka, Surma and Mursi in South Sudan and Ethiopia, arrange stick fights.

=== Specific games ===
==== Miniten ====
Miniten is a tennis-like game created by naturists in the 1930s, in order to provide a suitable game for naturist clubs which often lacked sufficient land to accommodate full-sized tennis courts. The original rules were drawn up by Mr R. Douglas Ogden, a Manchester-based businessman with an interest in sporting activities. Instead of racquets, players use wooden bats known as thugs, which are shaped like a box around the player's hand. The sport is run by the Amateur Miniten Association.

==== Running ====
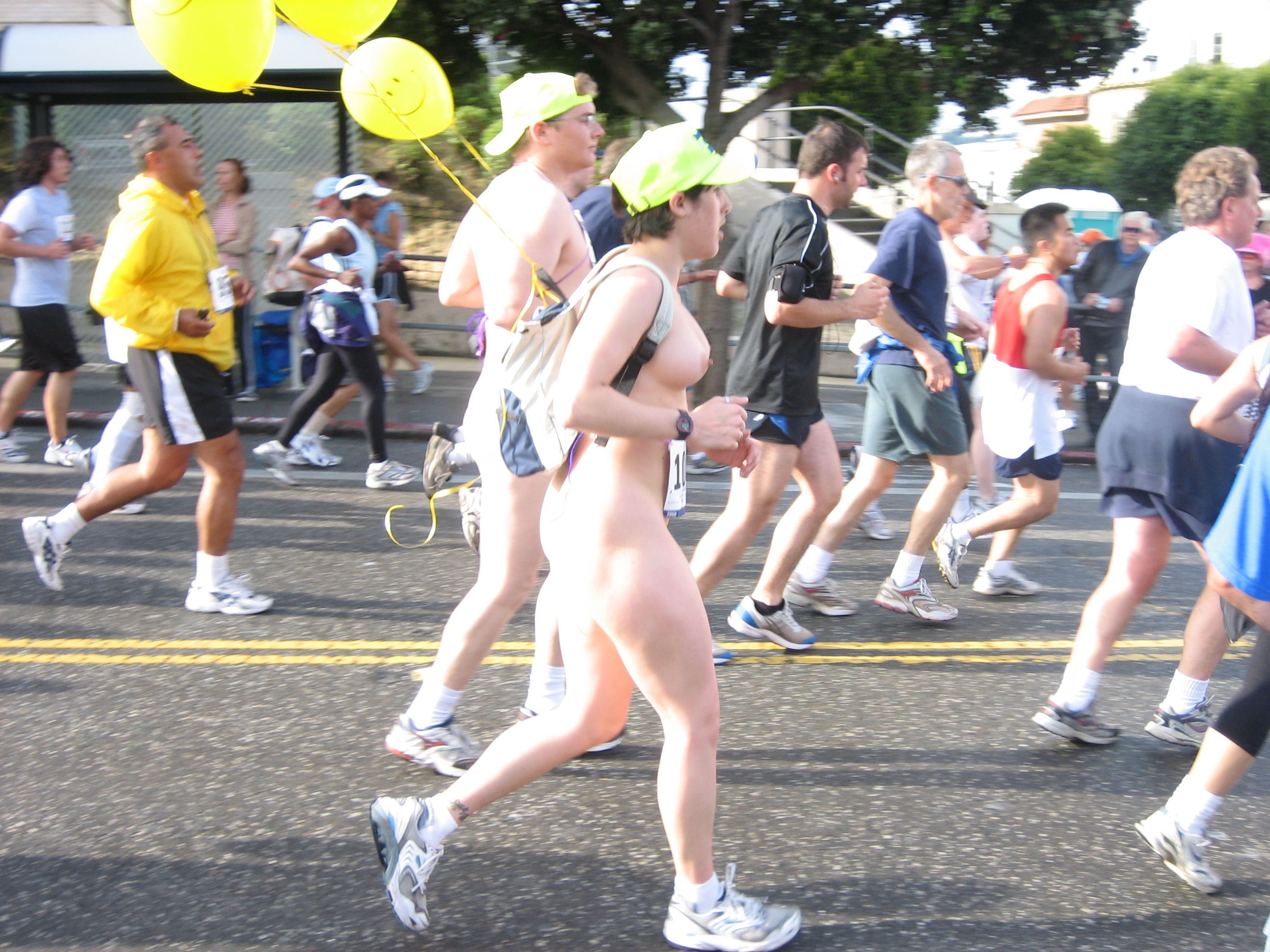
Runners in the Bay to Breakers, California (2006)

The 1974 book The Zen of Running recommends running barefoot and "as undressed as possible" to get "well bathed by sun and air".

Nudity was banned from the Bay to Breakers race in San Francisco in 2009.

A nude run called Carrera Nudista de Sopelana also takes place annually in summer in Sopelana (Bilbao/Spain) since 1999.

==== Rugby ====
A nude rugby match was held in Dunedin, New Zealand, each winter from 2002 to 2014, as pre-match entertainment for the first professional rugby game of the season. In more recent years it has become sporadic as organizers have other demands on their time.

==== Surfing ====
Tambaba Beach in João Pessoa, Paraíba, the first naturist beach in Brazil, is known for surfing including hosting a nude surfing tournament.

==== Swimming ====
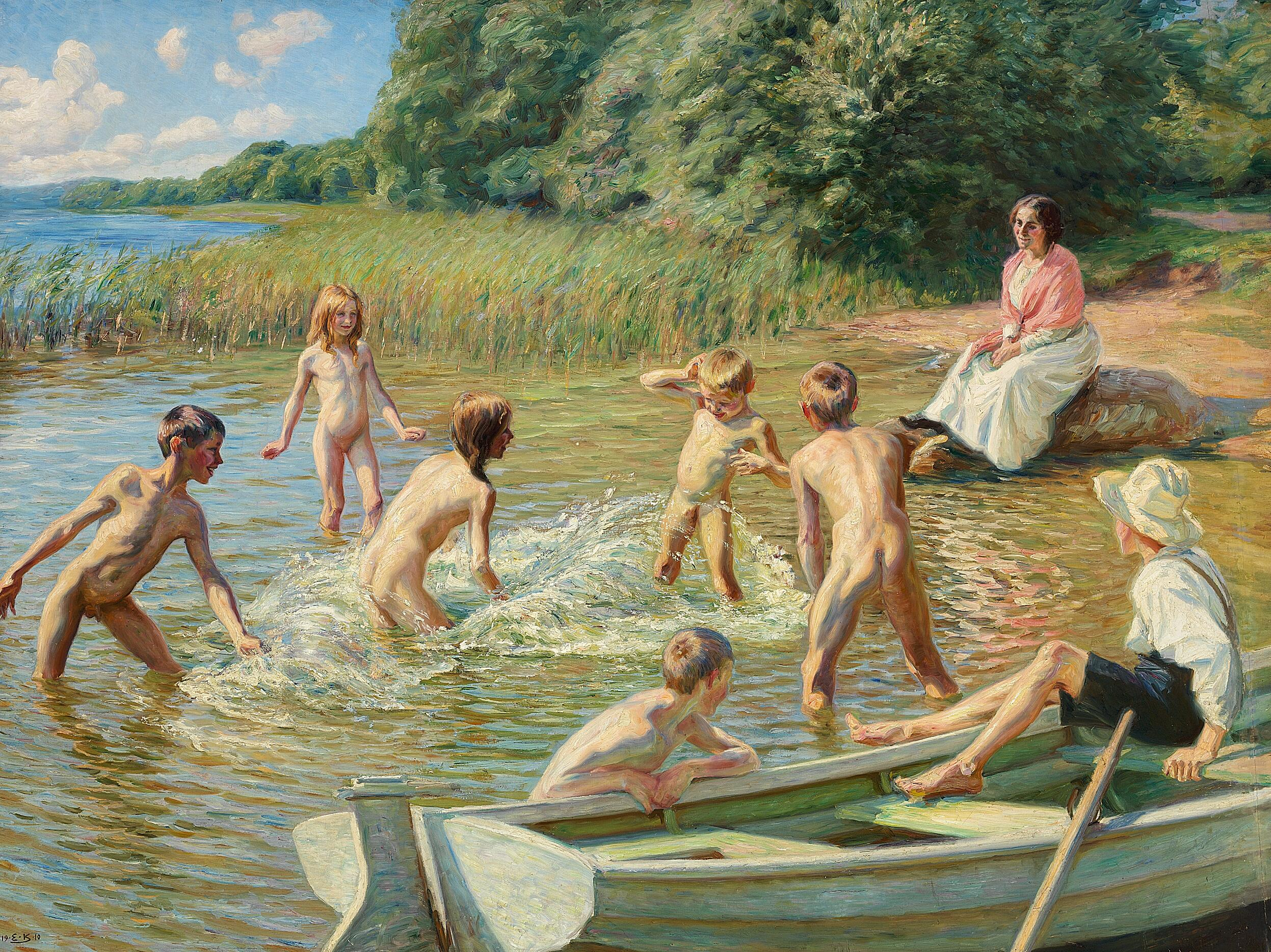
Children bathing near a rowboat by Emil Krause (1910)

Swimming as a sport includes both open water swimming and swimming in indoor pools.

At the beginning of the Victorian period in England, men and boys typically swam naked in the sea near bathing machines that were used by women. There were some efforts to designate separate beach sections for males and females. In the latter half of the 19th century, moral pressures led some town councils to establish zones for the women and men to bathe separately. There are very few records of magistrates enforcing the bylaws. Drawers came into use in the 1860s. In 1895, The Daily Telegraph, Standard, Daily Graphic and Daily Mail newspapers ran a campaign to reintroduce mixed bathing at all resorts. As sex-segregated beaches in town disappeared, bathing costumes for men became part of the commercial package and nude bathing ceased.

In the 1920s, schools and YMCAs in the United States built swimming pools for purposes of physical fitness and swimming instruction. Pool chlorination was not available, and there were concerns about disease. In addition, fibers from cotton and wool swimsuits could clog pool filters. Nude swimming allowed for swimmers to be visually inspected to check for open wounds or other signs of infectious disease. In 1926, the American Public Health Association (APHA) standards handbook recommended that indoor swimming pools used by men adopt nude bathing policies and that indoor swimming pools used by women require swimsuits "of the simplest type". Swimming policies at American high schools and junior high schools were influenced by APHA guidelines. From 1926 until 1962, every edition of the guidelines recommended nude swimming for males. School swimming classes were sex-segregated.

New developments like pool chlorination, improved pool filtration, and nylon swimsuits led the APHA to abandon its recommendation of nude pool swimming for males in 1962. However, the custom of enforced nude swimming for males did not immediately cease. During the 1970s, cultural and legal changes led to the gradual abandonment of enforced nude male swimming in schools. Federal Title IX rules mandating equality in physical education classes led most schools to switch to co-educational gym classes by 1980, making nude swimming culturally unacceptable.

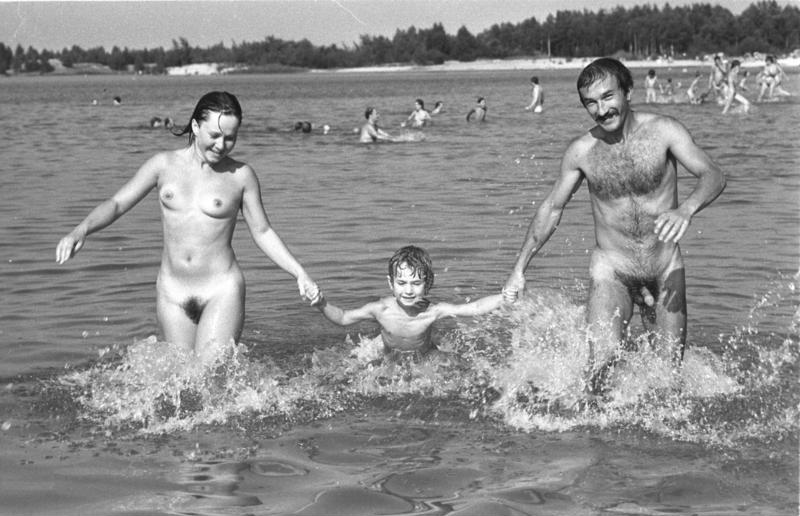
Nude swimmers at Lake Senftenberg, East Germany (1983)

In 2005, an article in The New York Times asserted that it was not uncommon for private clubs to give patrons opportunities for nude swimming. The Times added that clubs sometimes held male-only or female-only sessions.

In many countries in the 21st century, nude swimming mostly takes place at nude beaches, naturist facilities, private swimming pools, or secluded or segregated public swimming areas. Some Western countries, such as Canada and the United Kingdom, have no laws prohibiting nude swimming in public areas, but some countries around the world strictly enforce various laws against public nudity, including nude swimming. Some jurisdictions which maintain laws against public nudity may turn a blind eye to incidents of skinny dipping depending on the circumstances, as police officers on the spot decline to make arrests.

==== Volleyball ====
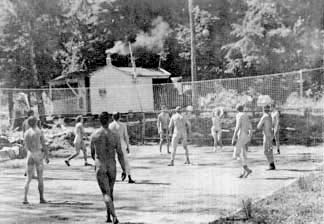
A nudist/naturist volleyball game at the Sunny Trails Club during the 1958 Canadian Sunbathing Association (CSA) convention in British Columbia, Canada

Naturists/nudists were early adopters of volleyball shortly after its invention in the late 19th century. Records of regular games in clubs can be found as early as the 1920s. Given the outdoor nature of nudism/naturism a beach version of volleyball was naturally adopted. By the 1960s, a volleyball court could be found in almost all nudist/naturist clubs.

Volleyball was perfect for naturism/nudism since most clubs were small and a volleyball court didn't require much space but involved many people. The game was also inclusive in that it supported varying levels of athleticism and did not require much equipment. But most importantly, it was ideal for nude play since there was no need for a team uniform or protective equipment.

A large (over 70 teams) nude volleyball tournament has been held each fall since 1971 at White Thorn Lodge in western Pennsylvania and several smaller tournaments occur each year in the United States.

=== Pro Wrestling ===
Erotic professional wrestling promotions such as the Naked Women's Wrestling League showcased nude females performing mock combat matches for titillation. The NWWL broadcast shows around the world, and its wrestlers were featured in magazines such as Penthouse, Playboy, and Maxim.

== See also ==
- Timeline of social nudity – shows the varying degrees of acceptance given to the naked human body by diverse cultures from prehistory to the modern era.
- Issues in social nudity
- List of clothing-free events
- List of places where social nudity is practised
- List of social nudity organizations
- The Body Issue, ESPN magazine's annual issue featuring nude photographs of athletes
- Strip games
