= World Naked Bike Ride =

Annual clothing-optional bicycle protest

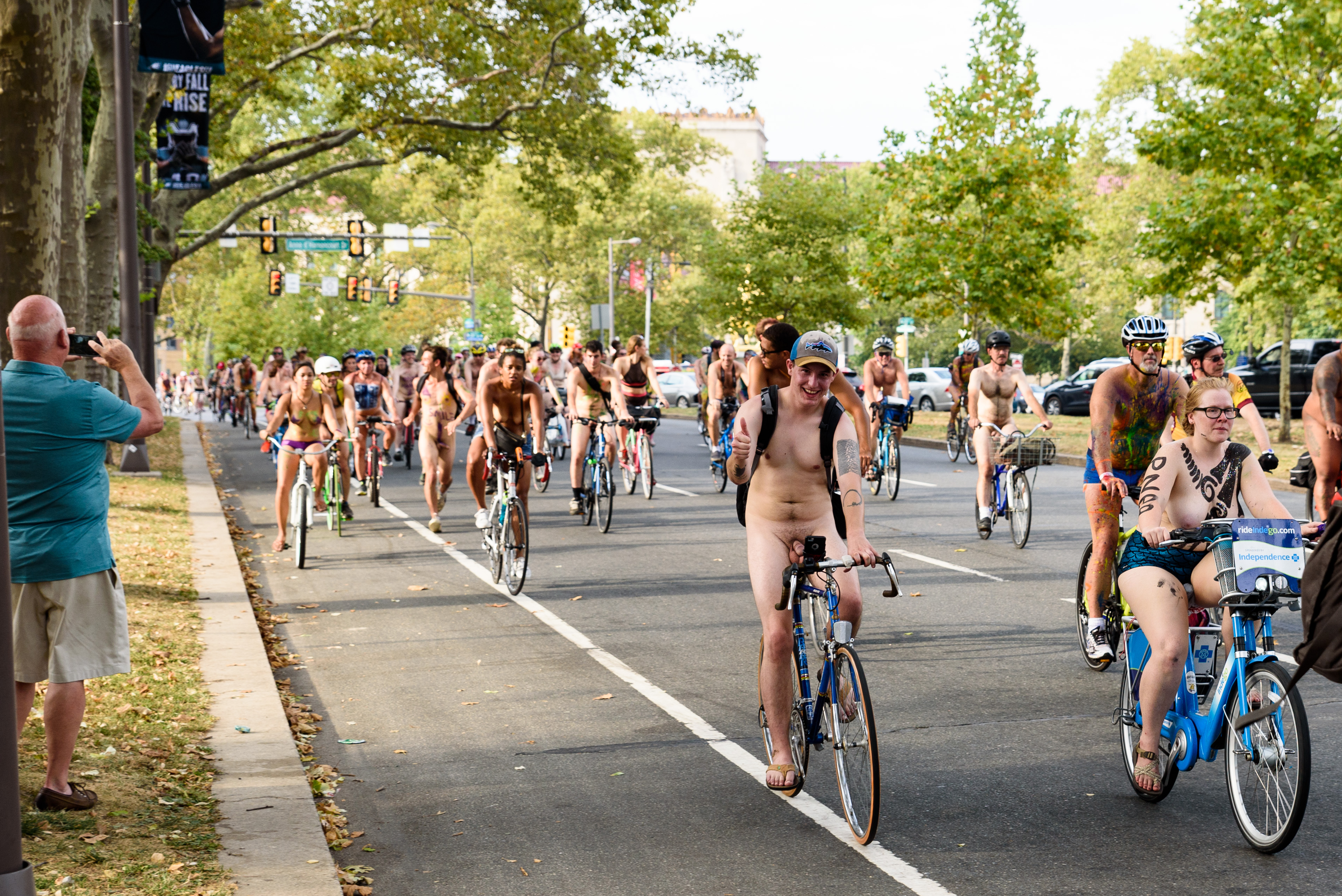
- Participants in the World Naked Bike Ride in Philadelphia, one of the largest and most famous internationally. Other non-motorized riders including skateboarders and unicyclists, as well as runners, are also welcome to participate.
- Status: active
- Genre: manifestation, bicycle ride
- Frequency: semi-annually
- Inaugurated: June 2004; 22 years ago

The World Naked Bike Ride (WNBR) is an international clothing-optional bike ride in which participants plan, meet and ride together en masse on human-powered transport (the vast majority on bicycles, but some on skateboards and inline skates), to "deliver a vision of a cleaner, safer, body-positive world." The largest iteration of the WNBR in the world takes place in Portland, Oregon averaging approximately 10,000 participants and thousands of spectators.

== History ==
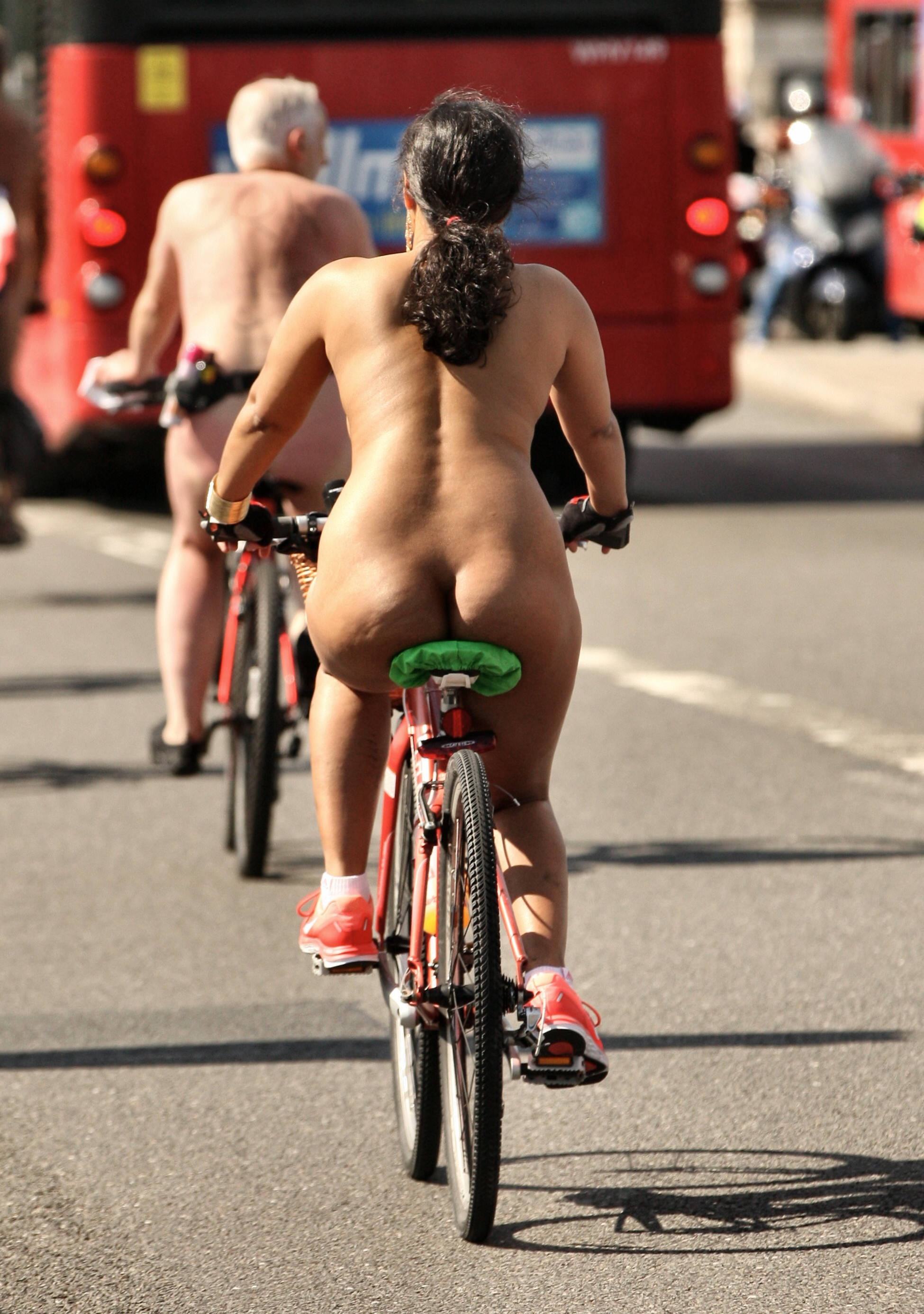
A woman at World Naked Bike Ride, London, 2017

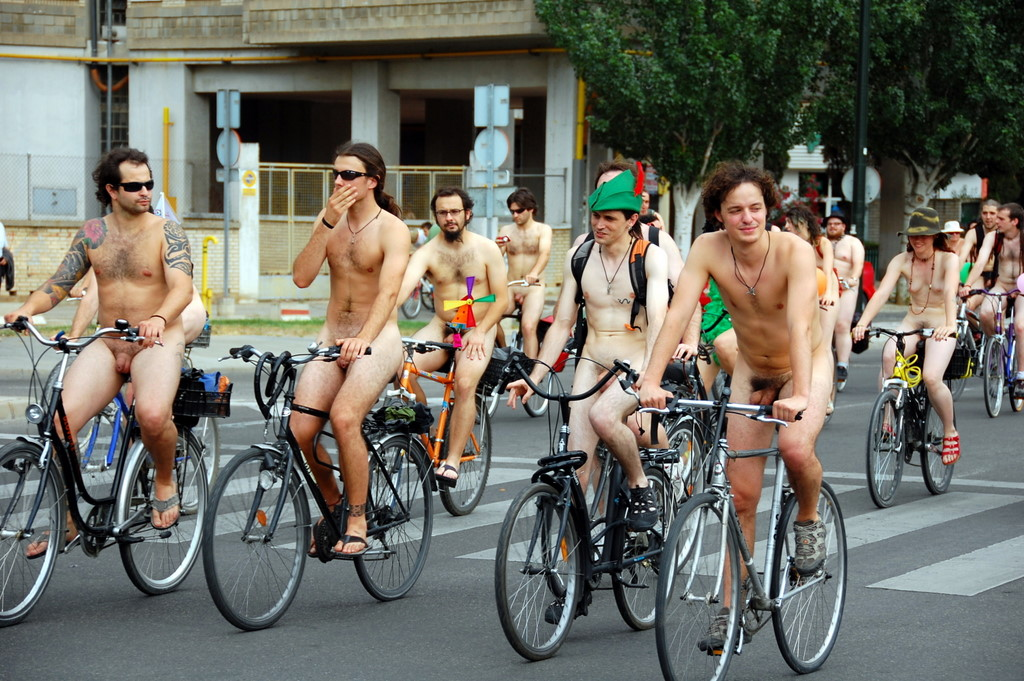
Zaragoza and Vancouver hosted the first NBR. Pictured are participants in the 2009 WNBR in the Spanish city.

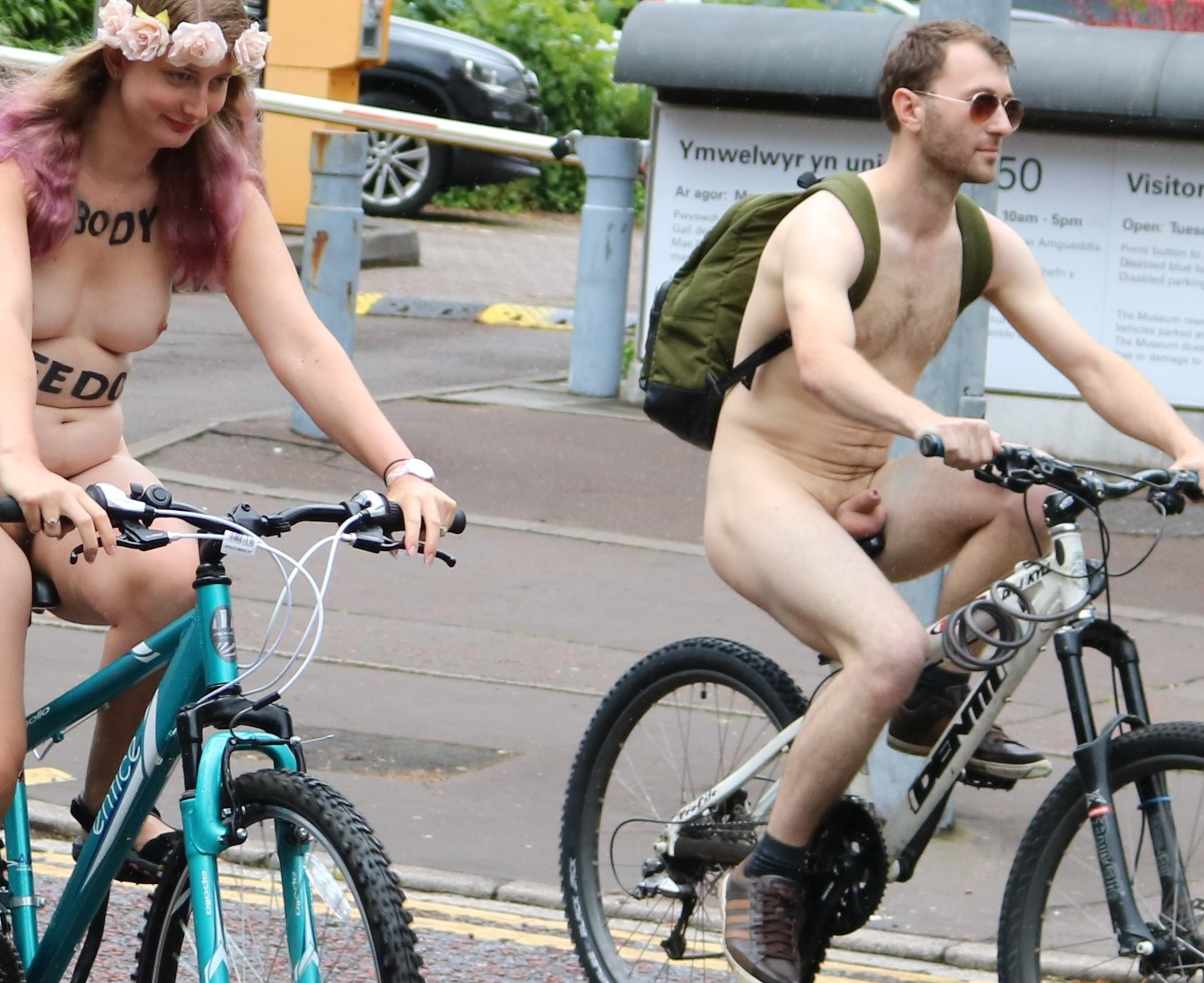
Woman and a man riding at the Cardiff WNBR 2018

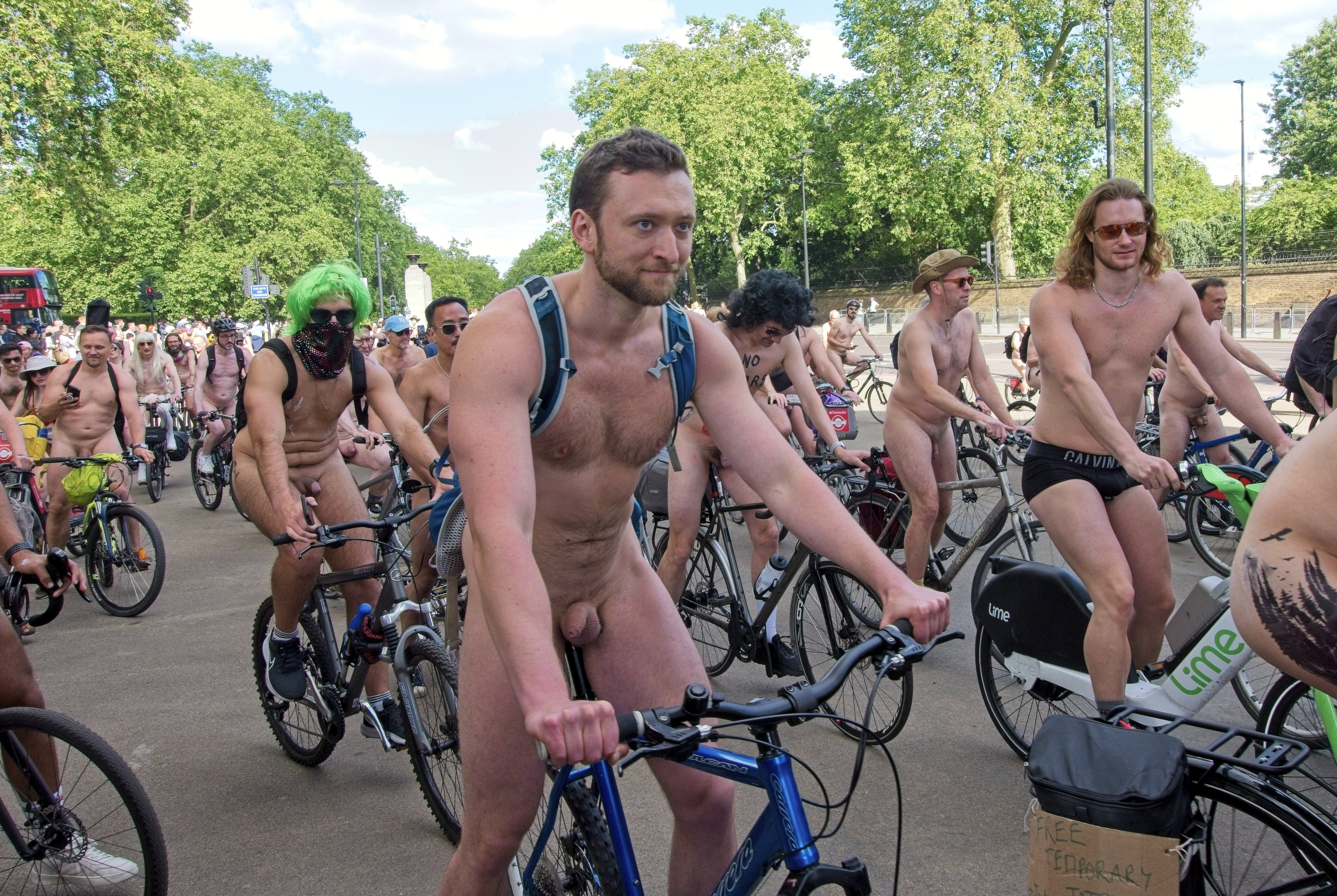
Participants in the World Naked Bike Ride London 2024 cycle on The Mall

World Naked Bike ride is believed to have been inspired by a 2001 naked ride protesting car dependency in Zaragoza (Spain). In 2003, Conrad Schmidt conceived the World Naked Bike Ride after organizing the Naked Bike Rides of the group Artists for Peace/Artists Against War (AFP/AAW). Initially, the message of the WNBR was protesting against oil dependency and celebrating the power and individuality of the human body. In 2006, there was a shift towards simplifying the message and focusing on cycling advocacy. Simon Oosterman, the organizer of the 2005 WNBR in Auckland, and the first to be arrested during a WNBR event, is credited with going further and refocusing on the issue on moving away from fossil fuel dependency in the context of climate change. He urged: "Stop the indecent exposure to vehicle emissions."

The 2004 WNBR saw events in 28 cities, in ten countries on four continents. By 2010, WNBR had expanded to stage rides in 74 cities, in 17 countries, from the United States to the United Kingdom and Hungary to Paraguay. The Portland World Naked Bike Ride in Portland, Oregon, is the largest WNBR event with over 10,000 participants in 2019.

=== United States arrests ===
Two male riders were arrested during the 2005 WNBR in North Conway, New Hampshire, and charged with "indecent exposure and lewdness". The two riders agreed to having the charges reduced to "disorderly conduct" and paid a $300 fine, the majority of which was paid for by the WNBR Legal Defense Fund. Six male riders were charged with public indecency during the 2005 WNBR Chicago ride and later prosecuted with sentences ranging from fines and non-expungeable conviction to three months of court supervision. In 2007, during the first World Naked Bike ride in Denver, Colorado police surrounded the bike riders and wrote several people tickets. During the WNBR held on June 12, 2010, two men were arrested by campus police at Western Washington University in Bellingham, Washington.

== Films ==
- "World Naked Bike Ride Thessaloniki Greece" (Βγήκαμε από τα Ρούχα Μας; 27' Greece, 2009) Greek language with English subtitles, won the Audience Award at 11th Thessaloniki Documentary Festival 2009
- "World Naked Bike Ride: The Documentary" (Toronto) 4 minute short
- World Naked Bike Ride (31 minutes, UK, 2006) directed by Johnny Zapatos of High Altitude Films, narrated by Jon Snow
- Indecent Exposure to Cars: The Story of the World Naked Bike Ride, produced by Conrad Schmidt
- Bare As You Dare: Portland's World Naked Bike Ride (Portland, OR) Directed by Ian McCluskey

== See also ==
- Reclaim the Streets
- Femen
- Free the nipple
- Critical Mass
- World Carfree Network
- Public nudity
- List of clothing-free events
  - Clothing-optional bike ride
  - Nakukymppi
