= No Pants =

No Pants most commonly refers to the state of not wearing trousers.

No Pants could also refer to:

- No Pants Day, an annual event
- No Pants Subway Ride, another annual event, known as the No Trousers On The Tube Ride in the United Kingdom

== See also ==
- Pages beginning with "No Pants"
