= Naked Mile (event) =

Informal athletics event

The Naked Mile, or Nude Mile, was a streaker run across the University of Michigan campus, which began in 1986. The first Naked Mile was run by student athletes to celebrate the last day of winter term classes in April, and became an annual event, continuing until the early 2000s. The run took place after dark, starting at around midnight. The route ran between two campus landmarks, starting at The Rock and finishing at The Cube near the Michigan Union.

== History ==
The first run in 1986 consisted of six friends from the university's crew and track teams who ran naked through the campus during the last week of classes. The local police were alerted, followed the naked runners and arrested the running group. The run became an informal annual event, which in its early years was largely held to shock people. The Naked Mile grew in size during the following years, and the number of runners increased into the hundreds.

By 1992 the number of runners exceeded 200 and the event was no longer seen as shocking. Some runners began adopting a theme and wearing accessories. Over time large numbers of women began to take part in the run and national media outlets began publicizing it. The run became popular with spectators, some of whom grabbed the female runners or shouted lewd comments at them. In 1999 there were around 800 runners, over 30% of whom were women. Nearly 10,000 spectators came to watch the event and TV news crews filmed it.

In 2000 the number of runners decreased to around 400, but the number of spectators remained the same at around 10,000. Few arrests had been made before 2000 and these were primarily for alcohol offenses. However, running naked down the street is illegal in the jurisdiction, and in 2000 a decision was made to crackdown on the event, leading to arrests for indecent exposure.

In 2001 the University and the Ann Arbor Police Department took action to reduce the number of runners and spectators. Concerns were raised about the risk of sexual harassment, injury and future embarrassment. Publicity was used to dissuade students from participating and only around 50 runners took part. The number of spectators was also reduced, to around 7,000. There were arrests for indecent exposure and other minor offences. After this attendance reduced each year. In 2002 a few dozen runners participated, all clothed in underwear. There were approximately 4,000 spectators and a small number of arrests. The official suppression of the event ceased in 2003 but the numbers attending did not rise. The 2004 event, the last to take place, consisted of a small group of students.

== See also ==
- Nude Olympics (Princeton)
- May Day (Washington College)
- Primal Scream (Harvard)
- Naked Donut Run (Brown)
- Naked Quad Run (Tufts)
- Naked Pumpkin Run
- Undie Run
