= Naked Mile =

Naked Mile may refer to:

- American Pie Presents: The Naked Mile, a 2006 American sex comedy film
- Naked Mile (event), a streaker run across the University of Michigan campus
