= Underwear as outerwear =

Fashion trend

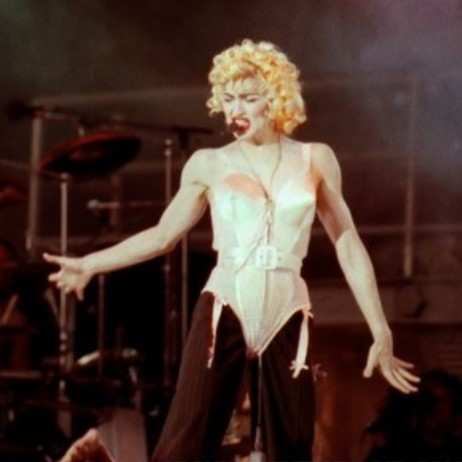
Madonna's costumes for her 1990 Blond Ambition World Tour are cited as an influence on turning corsets from underwear to stage attire.

Wearing underwear as outerwear is a fashion trend popularized by celebrities, sports and media. It began as a practical and comfortable variation of clothing, such as the T-shirt and the sleeveless shirt, but later evolved into provocative, controversial fashion statements. 21st century versions include the display of thongs and bras in women's clothing, and the display of underpants under low-slung pants in men. Wearing underwear as outerwear has historical antecedents in the display of undergarments in the sixteenth and seventeenth centuries.

== History ==
It is unclear when underwear as outerwear began as a fashion trend. In the 1920s Chanel unveiled womenswear made from jersey, a fabric that was usually used for undergarments. The T-shirt became popular outerwear after the Second World War. Short-sleeve shirts were originally intended to be a comfortable alternative to Victorian undergarments but teenagers began to wear them as outerwear, due in part to James Dean and Marlon Brando's characters frequently wearing them this way in the movies Rebel Without a Cause and the A Streetcar Named Desire respectively. Swimwear, such as the bikini, was used as underwear before the Renaissance, and slip dresses were first widely worn in the 1990s, made from layered chiffon, polyester satins and charmeuse, and often trimmed with lace.

In entertainment, underwear-like outfits are often worn by wrestlers and circus performers; former DC Comics editor Julius Schwartz said that this was the reason why superheroes like Superman wore briefs on top of their tights. Madonna has been credited for making lingerie a popular outfit for female music artists on stage, such as Beyoncé, Lady Gaga, Britney Spears, and Katy Perry, when Jean-Paul Gaultier designed corsets ("an emblematic symbol of fashion in the early 90s"), a cone bra and girdle for her Blonde Ambition Tour costumes. Coloured and decorative nipple pasties have been worn by Cara Delevingne, Bella Hadid and Doja Cat as part of fashion outfits. For men, sagging is often said to have been started by rap and hip hop artists in the 1990s, as well as skateboarders.

The sexual liberation movement of 1968 began the re-appropriation of the corset as a symbol of rebellion and "sexual perversity" by young women associated with London's punk and Goth subcultures. This re-appropriation allowed a symbol historically associated with female oppression, to become reconceived as a symbol of sexual empowerment in fashion. Outside of underwear fetishism, the corset made an appearance in evening gowns and wedding dresses.

=== Sportswear ===
The T-shirt would eventually become a part of sportswear fashion with designs from many fashion brands. Sports bras were first invented in 1975, and women have been wearing them under other clothing since then, but in 1999, Brandi Chastain scored the fifth kick in the penalty shootout to give the United States the win over China in the final game of the 1999 FIFA Women's World Cup Final, and she spontaneously whipped off her jersey in celebration, exposing her sports bra. Her act is regarded by some as a historical event that boosted the wearing of sports bras on their own. From that point forward, sports bras have increasingly been worn as outerwear.

== Cultural reception ==
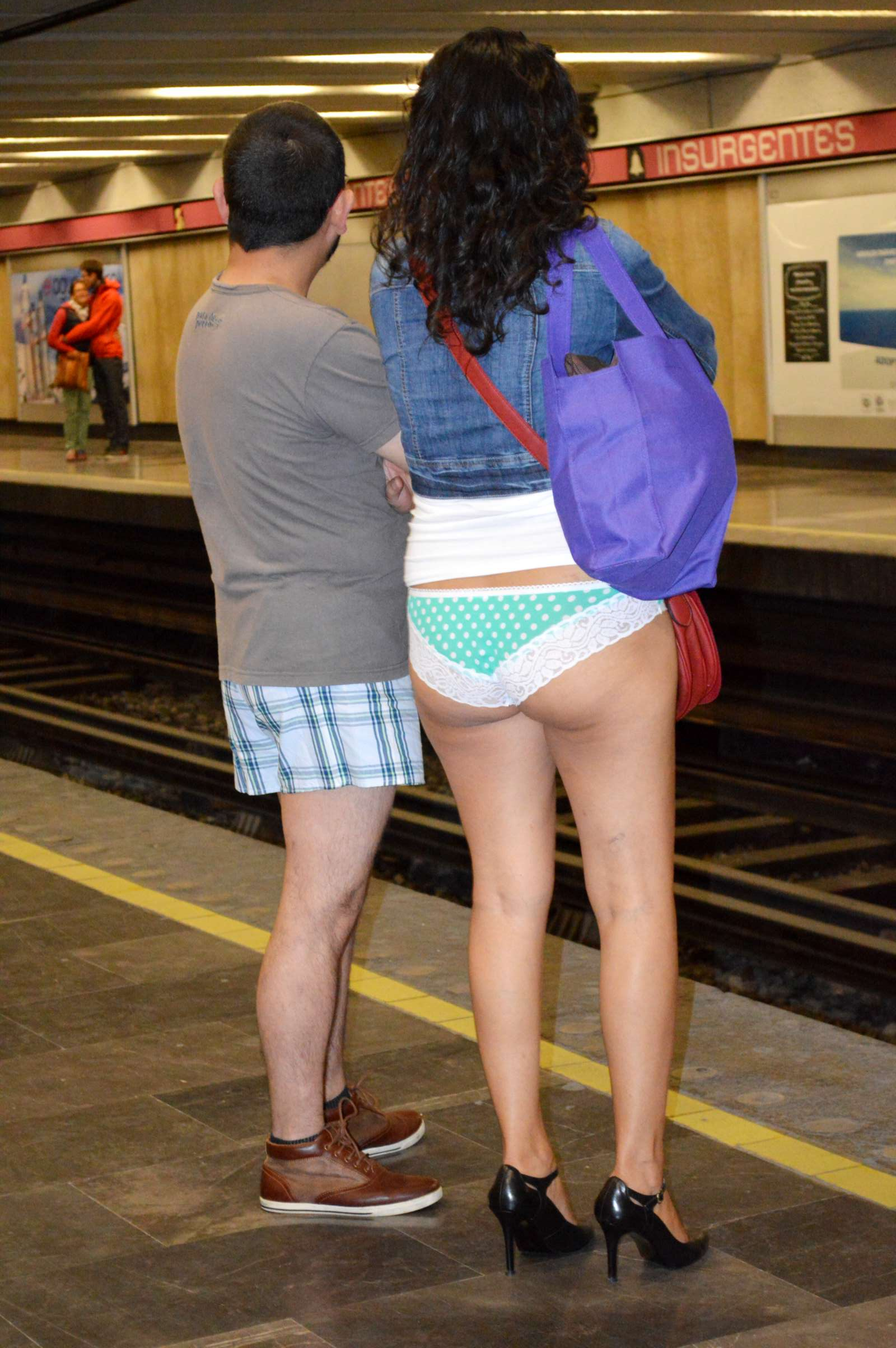
Office colleagues in Mexico City participating in 2015's No Pants Subway Ride

Society often portrays the public in underwear as surrealist and comedic: No Pants Day is an annual event held in various Western countries, where people publicly wear only underwear and leave their legs exposed. No Pants Subway Ride is a similar event to promote public wearing of underwear on subway trains. Another such event is Undie Run, where people run on the street wearing only their underwear.

The popularity of low-rise pants in the 21st century led to the unintentional trend of the "whale tail" among young women who aspired to wear something "rump-flattering", whereas sagging among young men and teenage boys became extremely controversial to the point of American towns demanding that it should be banned for indecency. However, the whale tail trend ended by the end of the 2000s and led to a rise in high-waisted clothing.

Menswear never experienced a similar fashion turnaround, and men who wore high-waisted bottoms were ridiculed for wearing "Dad jeans". Underwear companies took note on men's preference of wearing their trousers at the hips because low-rise pants sat lower than underwear and caused non-sagging men to expose their underpants waistband, so they exploited it through designing waistbands with bright colors and larger logos. Calvin Klein Underwear chief creative designer Bob Mazzoli explained in 2009, "Instead of a functional component, the waistband is a marketing platform and a canvas for real design [...] Seeing somebody with jeans that fall just below the waist to the point where the underwear shows is part of our cultural vernacular [and] it's something we consider in the design process." 2(x)ist's creative director Jason Scarlatti added: "It's bragging rights for the customer. It says, 'I paid good money for this.'" Jockey underwear, credited as one of the first underwear brands to print its logo on waistbands, unveiled an advertising campaign in 2013 that featured models holding up their shirts to show the Jockey waistband exposed above their jeans and shorts.

== See also ==
- Bikini in popular culture
- Bra § Undergarment as outerwear
- Bralessness
- Breastaurant
- Camel toe
- Fetish fashion
- Go Topless Day
- Indecent exposure
- Leotard
- Sagging
- Sexual objectification
- Social impact of thong underwear
- Superman
- Swimsuit competition
- Upskirt
- Underwear fetishism
- Whale tail
