= Primal Scream (Harvard) =

Tradition at Harvard University

Primal Scream is a tradition at Harvard University that forms part of the streaking at educational institutions. At midnight on the last night of reading period and before final exams begin, students streak through the Old Yard. The streakers begin in the north end of The Yard and generally make one lap around, but the more adventurous sometimes aim for more. This is done both semesters, even during New England winters.

Some of the streakers dress up in capes and masks, or top hat and tails, or other costumes, but their genitalia are still exposed. The walkways through which students run are lined with spectators and the Harvard University Band plays beforehand to excite the crowd.

Before it became a "night when the whole student body comes together to gawk at just that" it was a night with a closer association to its name. Beginning in the 1960s students would congregate in the Yard or open their windows and just yell for 10 minutes. It was designed as a way to release stress. By the 1990s, the streaking aspect of the evening had become prominent. It is still designed to give stressed out students a chance to "step outside the box".

The transition from yelling to streaking is unclear. Old administrators that have been at Harvard since the 1970s speak of an earlier day of adventurous streakers. Before there was streaking in the yard began the Quad Howl—streaking in what used to be old Radcliffe. These administrators of the Quad houses speculate that the change from the Quad to the Yard, which happened during their time, was because the narrow pathways of the Quad could not accommodate the increasing multitudes of people with an urge to get naked in public. The natural choice was to go join those in the Yard, giving them something to get excited about.

A small tradition of Quad Howl continues today: after each Primal Scream, a few Quad residents return to the Quad for a naked lap there. Another related tradition is the Lingerie Study Break where undergraduates in Lamont Library strip off their clothes in front of hundreds of other students studying.

While the records are not entirely clear, it appears that when Charles Adams, son of John Adams and brother of John Quincy Adams, was a student at Harvard, he and a few friends were disciplined for getting drunk and running naked across the campus with friends. He was later readmitted.

Thursday, December 11, 2014, at 12:00 midnight marked the first time that students ran the naked lap in a clockwise direction. The tradition of the naked lap has been to start outside of Hollis Hall and then take off initially running west around the Old Yard, counterclockwise. However, Black Lives Matter protesters gathered and linked arms just west of Hollis blocking the traditional path. A bit past midnight students decided to break tradition and run the naked lap clockwise in order to avoid the protesters and complete the lap.

== See also ==
- Columbia University's Naked Run
- Streaking at Dartmouth College
- Princeton University Nude Olympics
- Tufts University's Naked Quad Run
- May Day
- Public nudity
- Scream therapy
