= No Pants MAX Ride =

Annual event in Portland, Oregon, U.S.

- Location: Portland, Oregon
- Country: United States

No Pants (Note: In American English, pants correspond to trousers in British English.) MAX Ride is an annual event in Portland, Oregon, United States, as part of No Pants Subway Ride. It is held during the winter months. Participants ride the MAX Light Rail without wearing pants. The event also collects clothing donations for the nonprofit organization Portland Rescue Mission. According to Frommer's, the event is sometimes referred to as the "Boxer Rebellion".

The 2015 event was organized by Todd Jensen and Vanessa Wolf Jensen. Dozens of people gathered at Skidmore Fountain, then boarded the light rail to Pioneer Courthouse Square, where they took a group photograph and danced the Can-can. This was the eleventh annual event in Portland, according to the Jensens.

In 2016, dozen of participants gathered at the same fountain, took the light rail to Pioneer Courthouse Square, then took a group photograph at Jake's Grill before returning to the fountain. A couple also became engaged to marry at the event, having met at No Pants MAX Ride three years earlier.

Following a postponement because of weather, the 2017 event took place on a snowy day. In 2018, approximately four dozen participants traveled from the fountain to Pioneer Square, then gathered at Paris Theatre. In 2019, Dixie Tavern was the starting point and after party host. Approximately three dozen people participated.

No Pants MAX Ride has been named as an example of the "Keep Portland Weird" slogan.

== See also ==
- Culture of Portland, Oregon
- No Pants Day
- World Naked Bike Ride
