= Sundress =

Lightweight warm weather dress, usually with shoulder straps

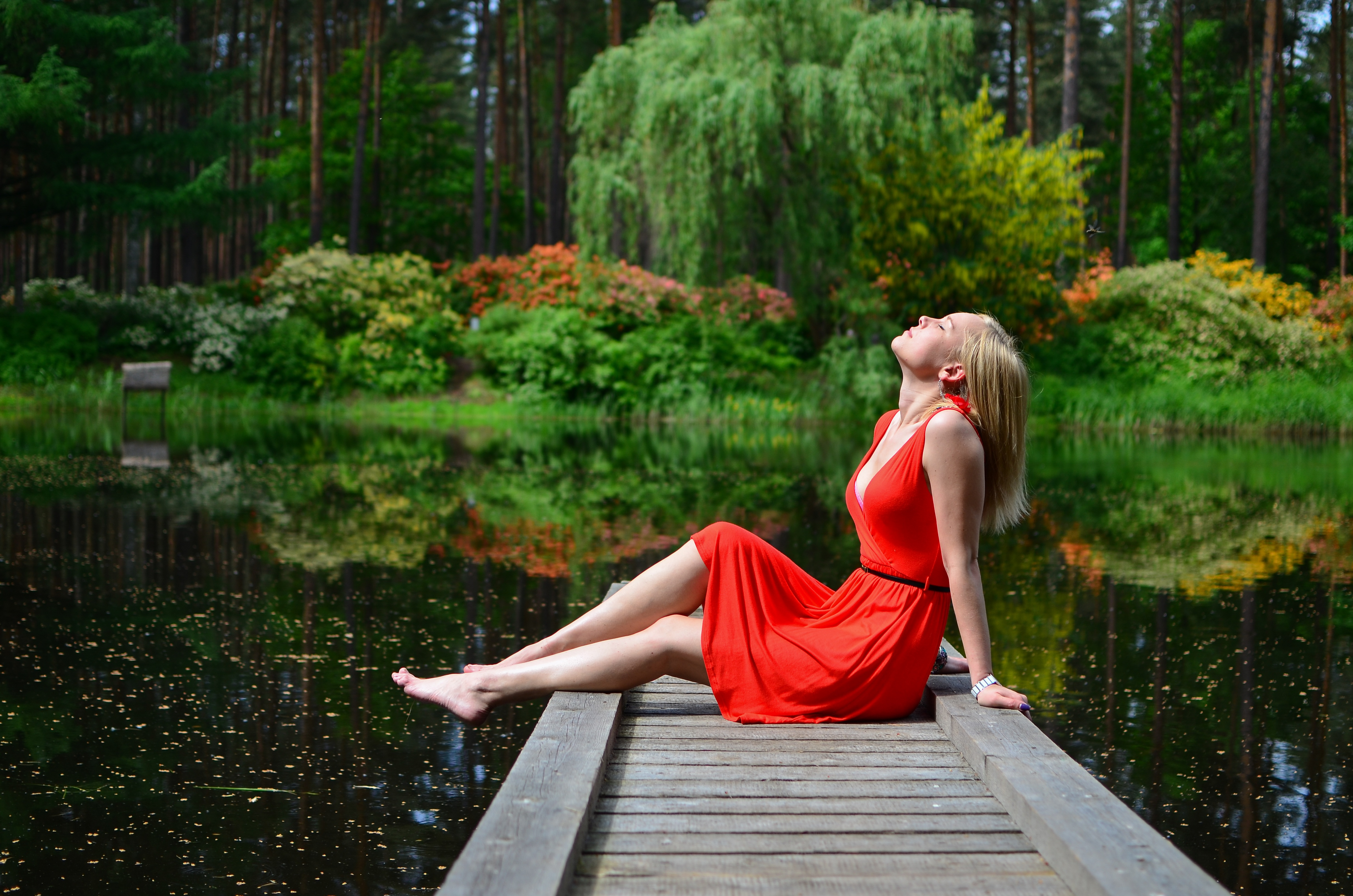
Model wearing a red sundress

A sundress or summer dress is an informal or casual dress intended to be worn in warm weather, typically in a lightweight fabric, most commonly cotton, and usually loose-fitting. It is commonly a bodice-style sleeveless dress, typically with a wide neckline and thin shoulder straps, and may be backless. A sundress is typically worn without a layering top and is not usually worn over a blouse, sweater, or t-shirt, or with leggings.

While the word "sundress" was first used in the early 1940s, they really came into vogue in the 1950s and were especially popularized by Lilly Pulitzer in the 1960s.

== Styles ==
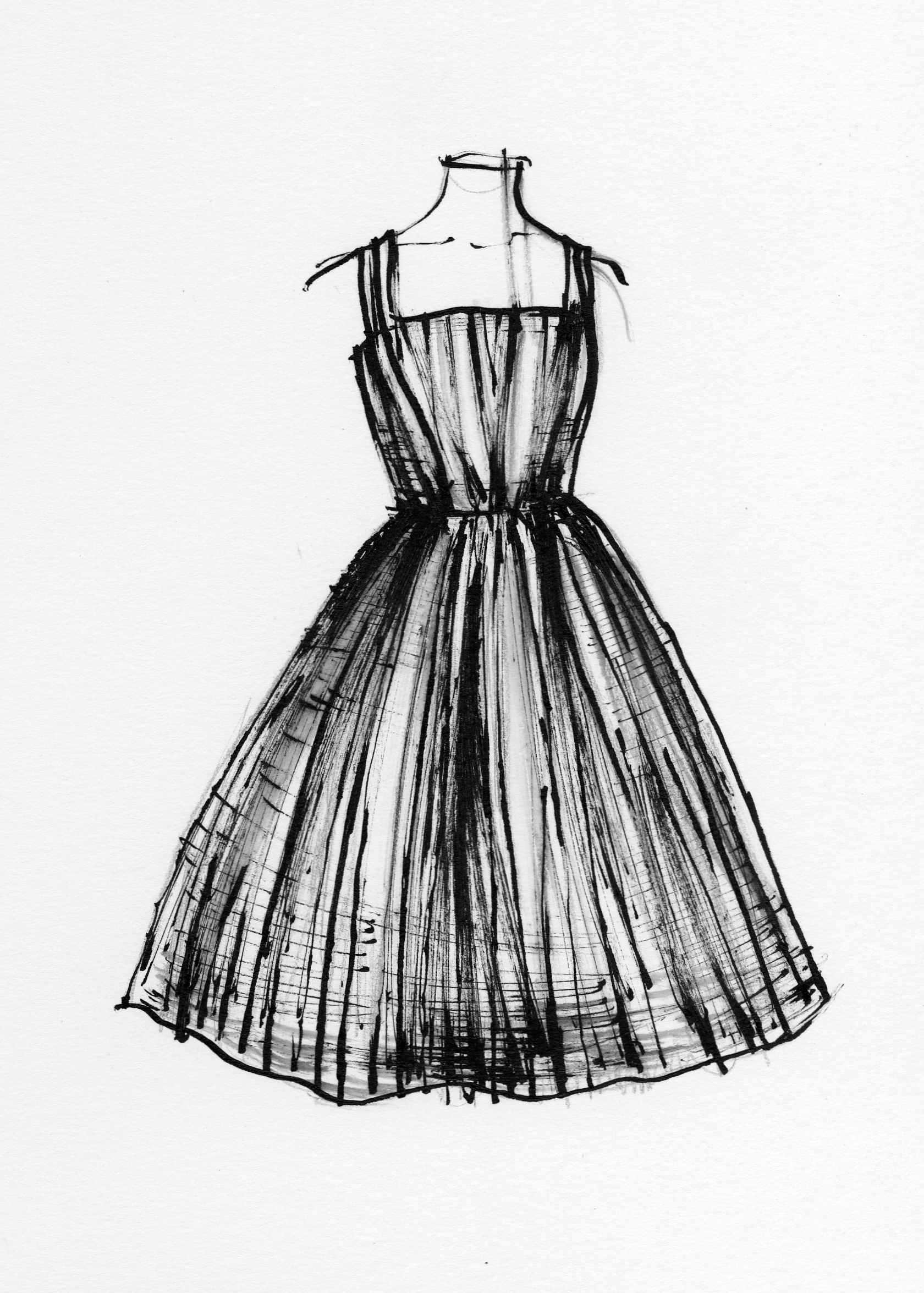
Sketch of a typical sundress

The sundress is considered by many people to be both more practical and more comfortable than other varieties of dresses, particularly in warm or hot weather.

Sundresses can be of any neckline and hemline, ranging from mini to full length, though they are more often midi or maxi length. They are typically but not always, sleeveless and collarless, with a wide neckline and thin shoulder straps.

Sundresses can use a variety of closure types, including back zippers, side zippers, front buttons, back buttons, back ties, pullover or other closure styles. They may also be without any closures or fasteners and put on over the head or slipped on by pulling up from below. A lot of sundresses have patterns on them, the most common being a floral pattern.

Since the 1940s, a sundress-like one-piece swimsuit appeared, has come into use, though some now find it matronly or gaudy.

== Gallery ==
Sundresses from different decades

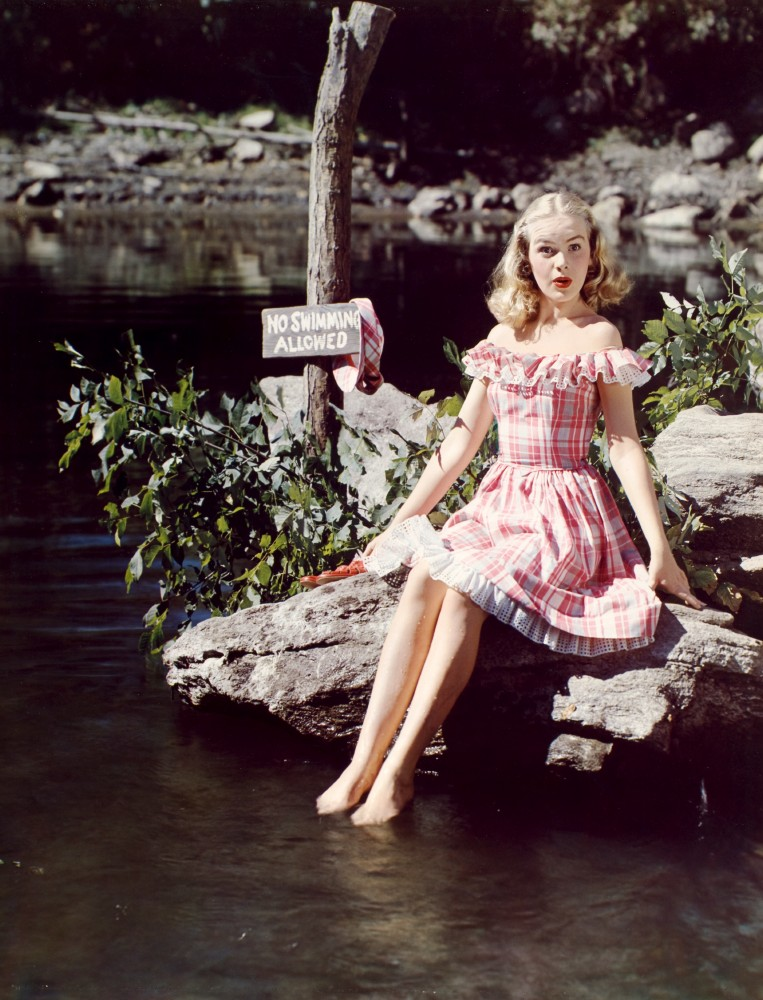
1940s sundress with off-the-shoulder ruffles

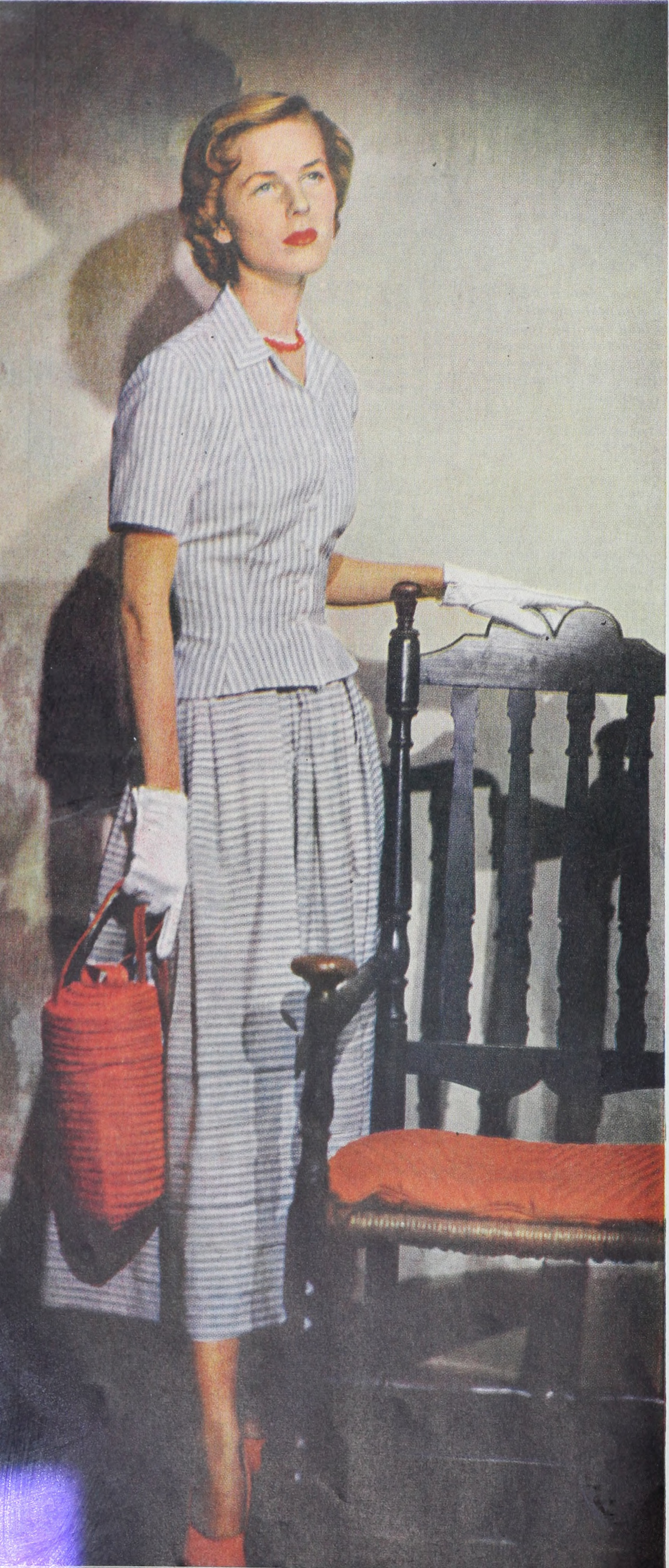
1940s with matching jacket

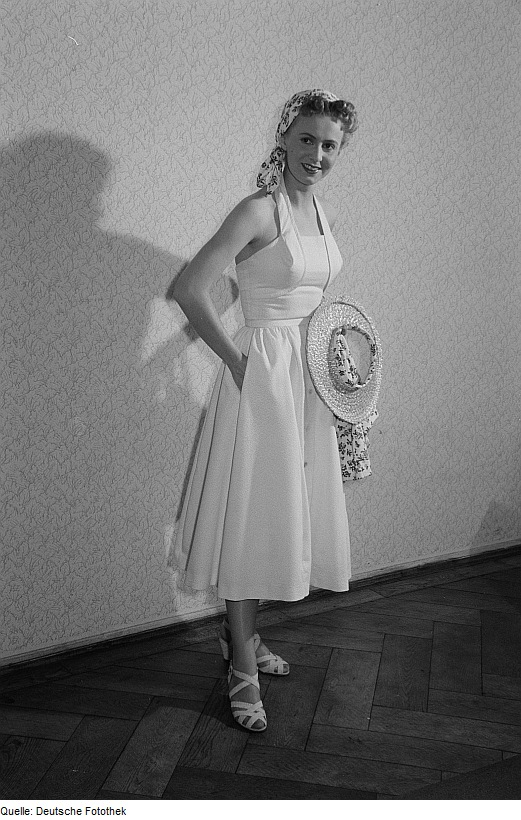
1950s sundress

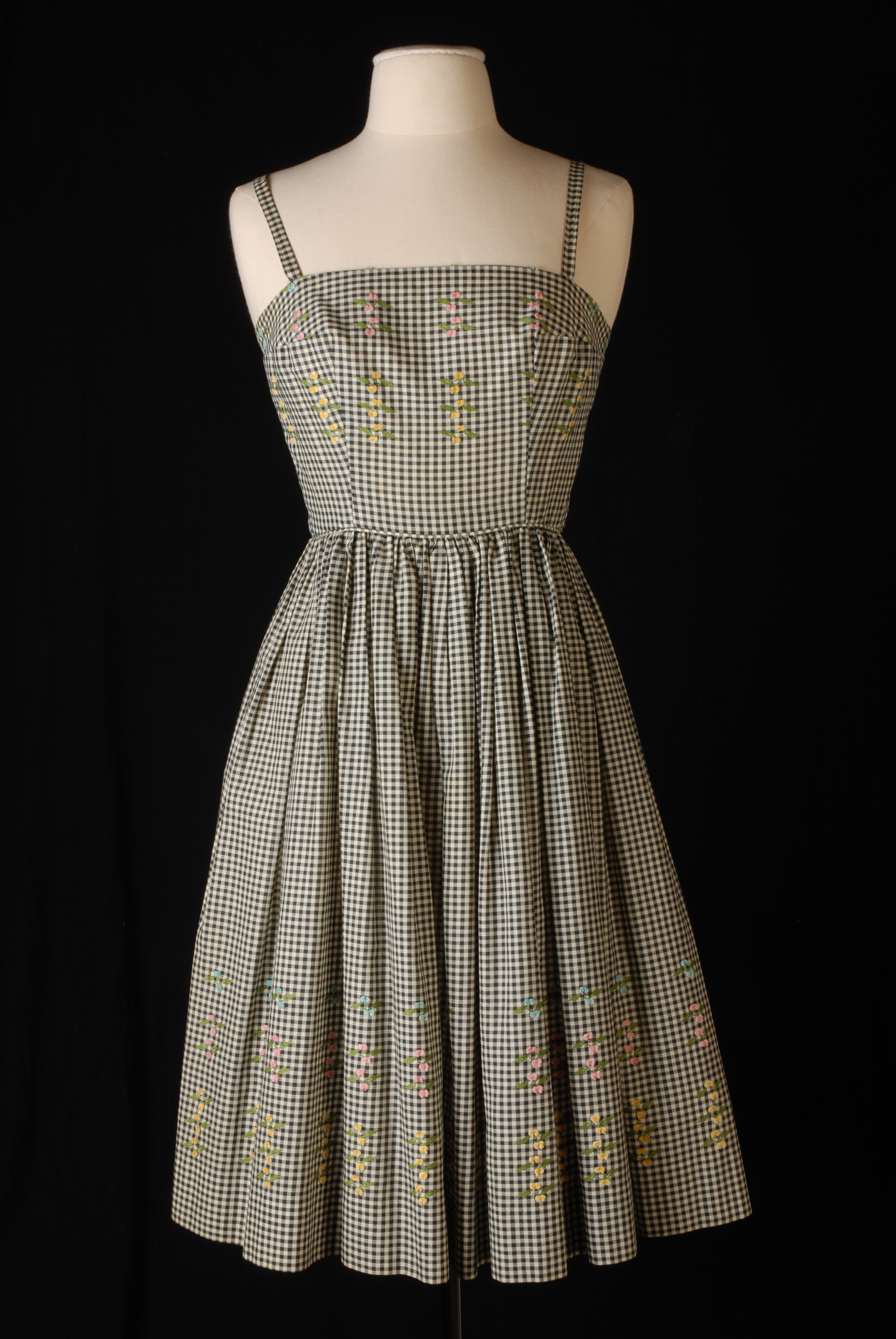
1950s sundress

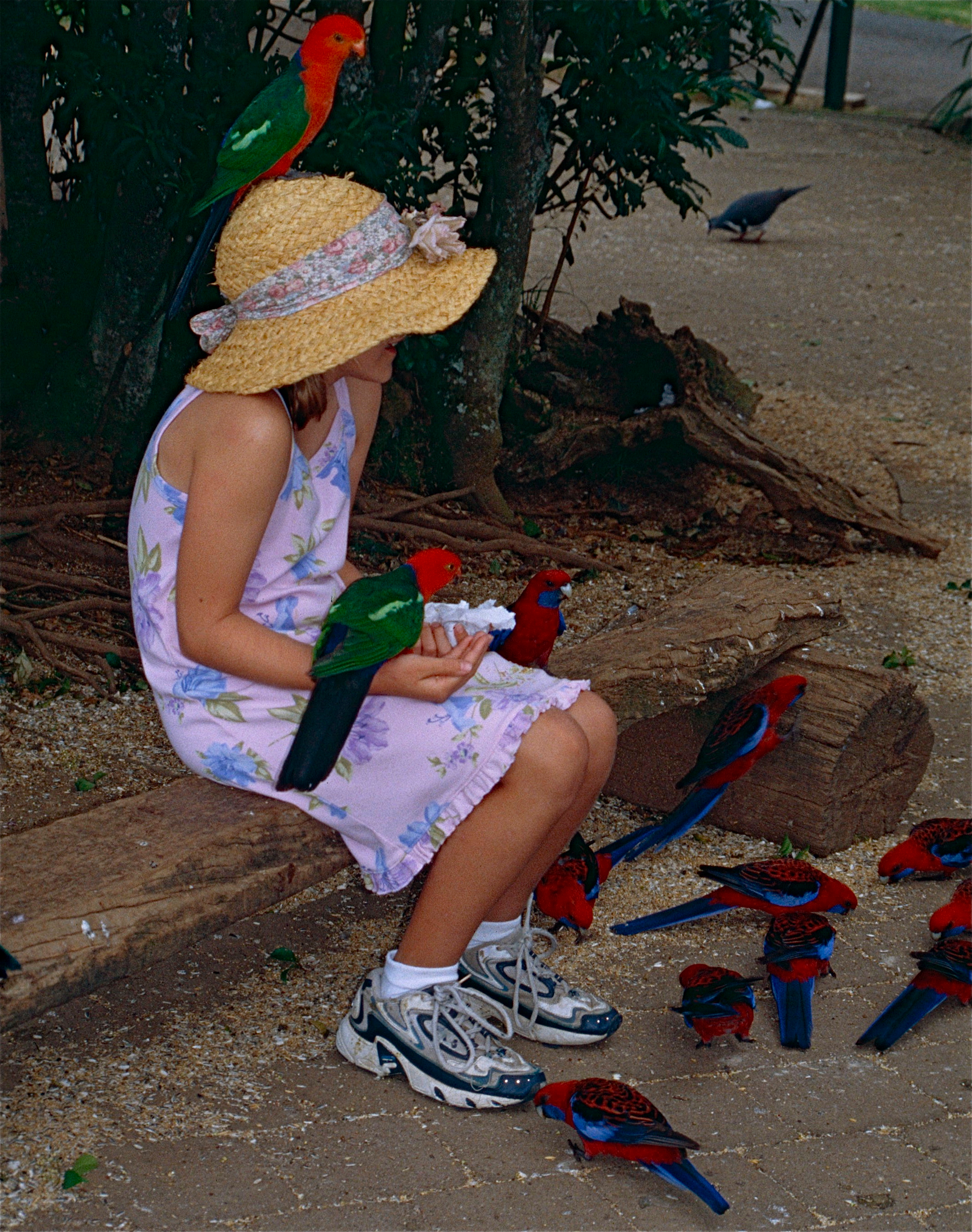
2000s girl in sundress

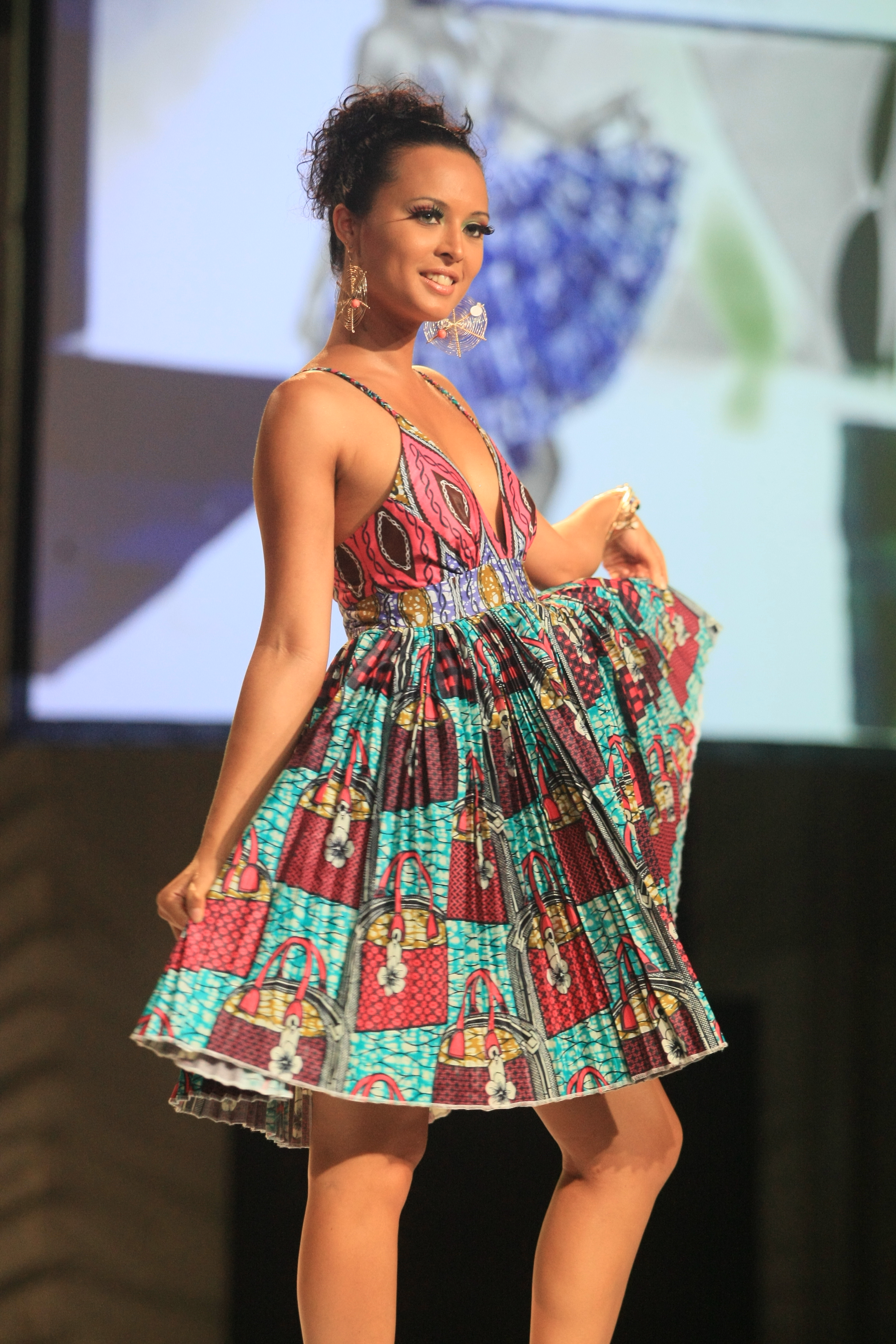
2010s short sundress

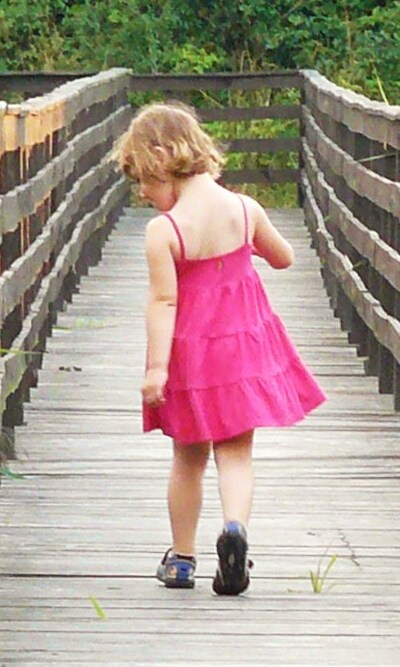
2010s, with tiered skirt

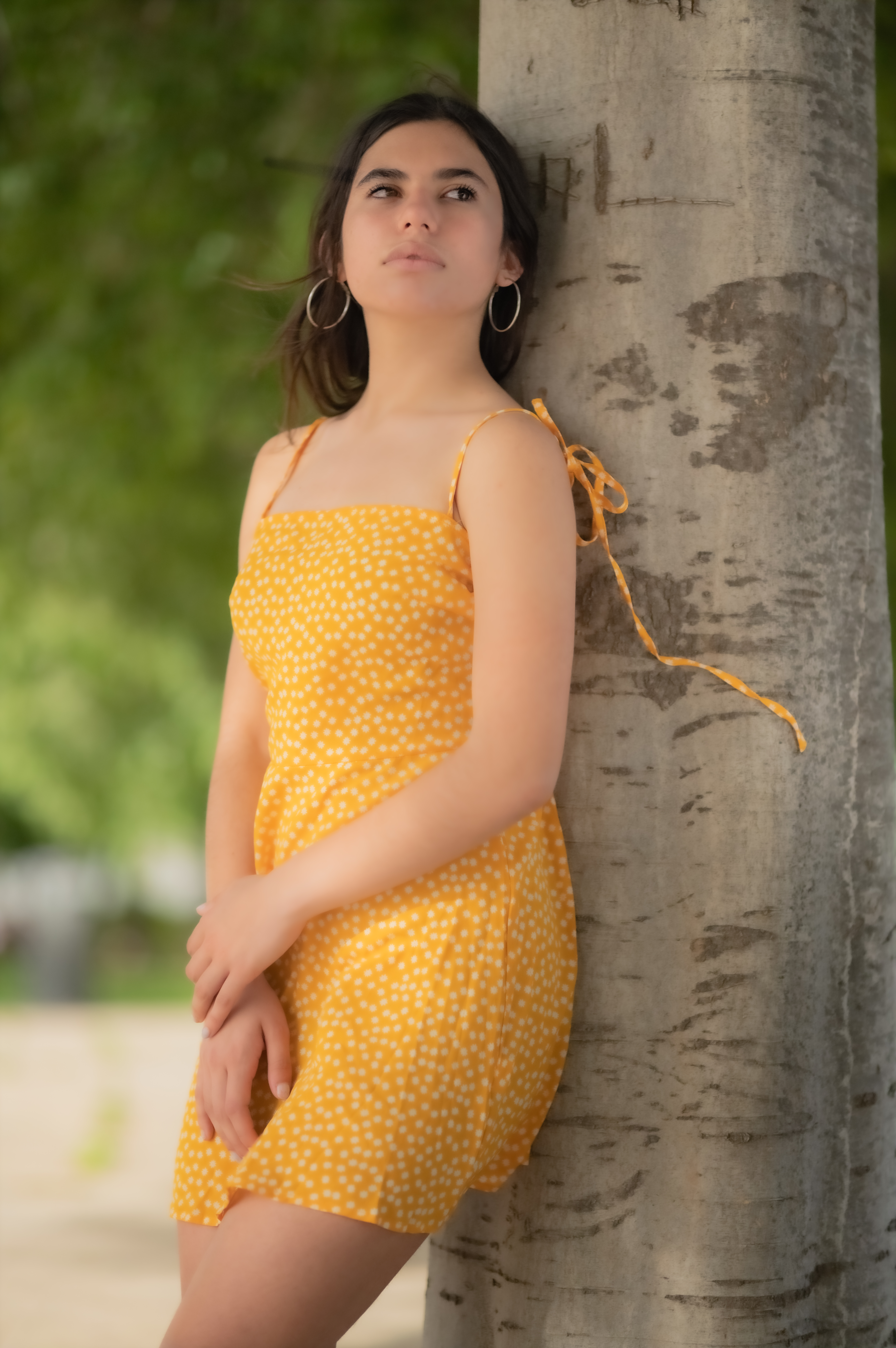
2020s mini sundress

== Definition controversies ==
Sundress is a fuzzy concept, with various opinions on which traits are necessary and sufficient to the definition, including:

- Floral print, light color, or white
- Light fabric
- Loose and flowing
- Revealing neckline
- Straps instead of sleeves
- Length above ankle or knee

Potentially overlapping types include slip dress, day dress, shift dress, shirtdress, caftan, tube dress, nap dress and milkmaid dress.

== See also ==
- Jumper dress
- Sarafan
