= Dixie Tavern =

Bar in Portland, Oregon, U.S.

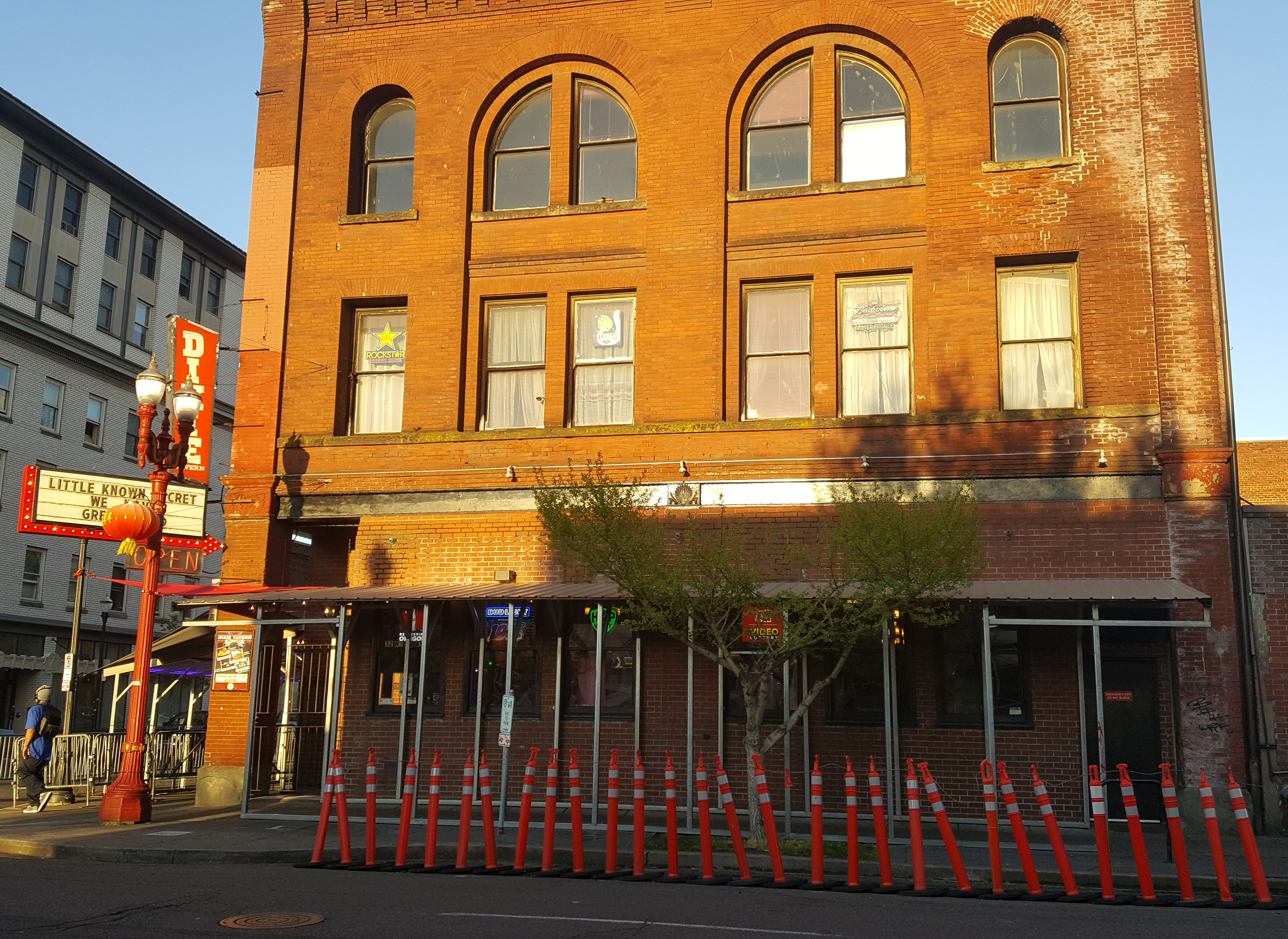
- The bar's exterior in 2022
- Interactive map of Dixie Tavern

Restaurant information
- Established: 2005
- Owners: Concept Entertainment Four, LLC
- Location: Portland, Oregon, United States
- Coordinates: 45.5237°N 122.6731°W
- Website: dixiepdx.com

Dixie Tavern is a bar and nightclub in Portland, Oregon, United States. It began operating in the northwest Portland part of the Old Town Chinatown neighborhood in 2005.

== Description ==
Dixie Tavern is a two-level bar and nightclub at the intersection of 3rd Avenue and Couch Street in the northwest Portland part of the Old Town Chinatown neighborhood. It is owned by Concept Entertainment Group. Portland Monthly has described the venue as a "rock & roll tavern" with live music, multiple bars, and regular 1980s-themed nights. Willamette Week has said Dixie Tavern has an "urban cowgirl" theme and is best known for "female patrons dancing on the bar" as well as goldfish races, during which a water gun is used to get a goldfish to swim to the finish line. The Portland Mercury's Alex Zielinski has described the venue as a "country bar" with security staff and without a strict dress code.

The venue hosts themed parties and hosts dancing to country and rock music. In 2010, Kate Loftesness of The Oregonian wrote, "Dixie Tavern bills itself as a rock club even though its most prominent features are female bartenders in belly shirts and Daisy Dukes dancing on the bar, bras hanging from the ceiling, beer cans and taxidermied animals." In 2017, the newspaper's Grant Butler said, "This Southern-fried rock and roll bar ... is known for female bartenders who dance on the countertops to Bon Jovi and Lynyrd Skynyrd – very "Coyote Ugly," circa 2000. Dixie Tavern may not be trendy, but it's one of Old Town's most-popular bars."

== History ==
Co-owned by Dan Lenzen and Jeff Plew, Dixie Tavern opened in 2005, in the space previously occupied by Cobalt Lounge. In 2020, Portland Monthly's Margaret Seiler said Dixie Tavern was "one of the few 21st-century new businesses outside of the South to use Dixie in its name".

=== 2010s ===
The bar hosted goldfish races weekly, as of 2010. In 2011, out of 125 bars for which complaints have been received by the city about nuisance, Dixie was one of the eight sent to the Time, Place, and Manner hearings.

In 2013, Portland City Council voted to require fourteen local nightclubs to install sprinklers. In 2017, was among a group of nightclubs that filed a lawsuit against the city for "[overstepping" its authority in imposing a 2013 ordinance mandating sprinkler systems, and then compounded the damages by applying the ordinance inequitably", according to Willamette Week.

Dixie Tavern hosted pre- and post-event parties for the No Pants MAX Ride in 2019.

=== 2020s ===
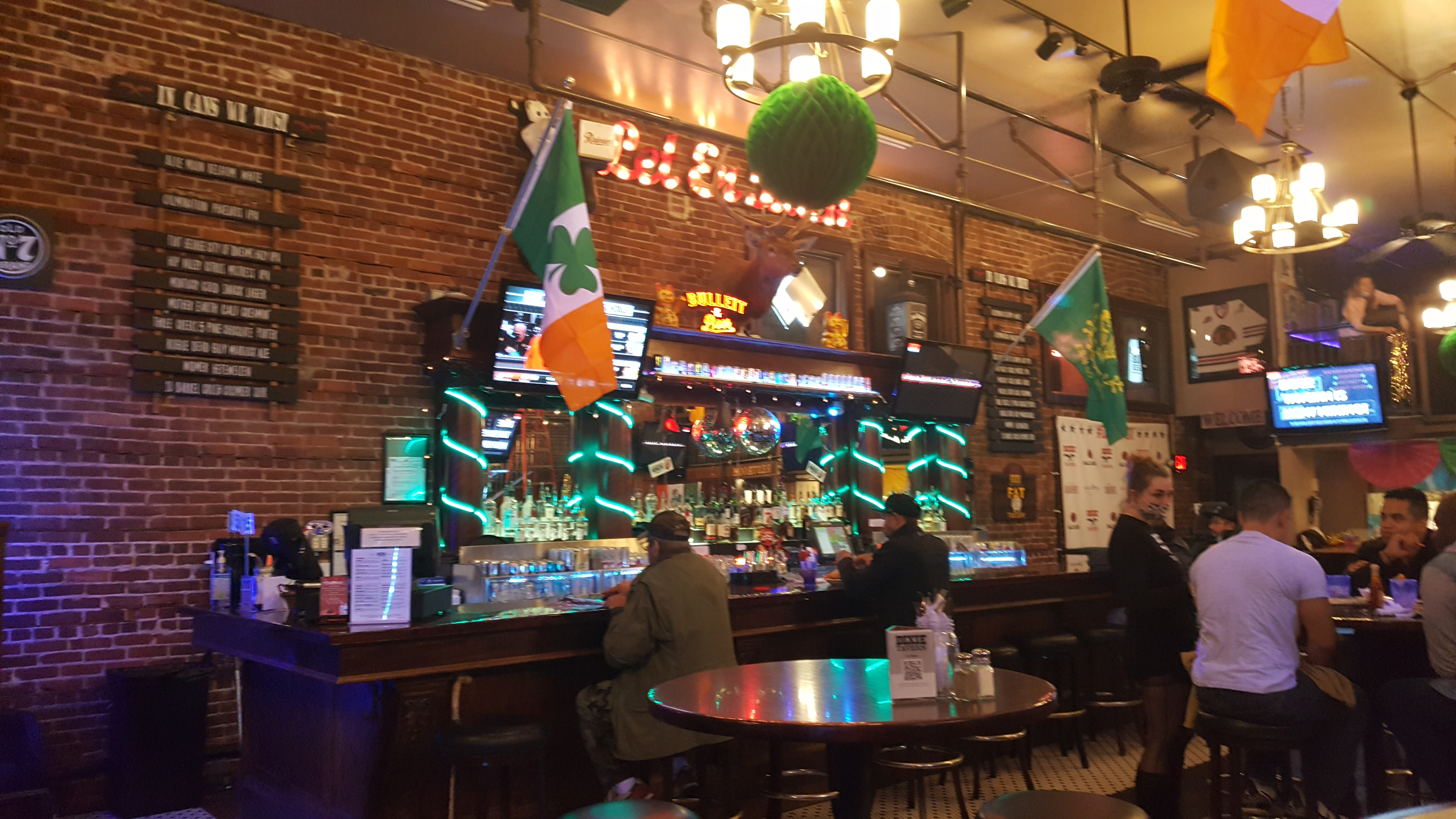
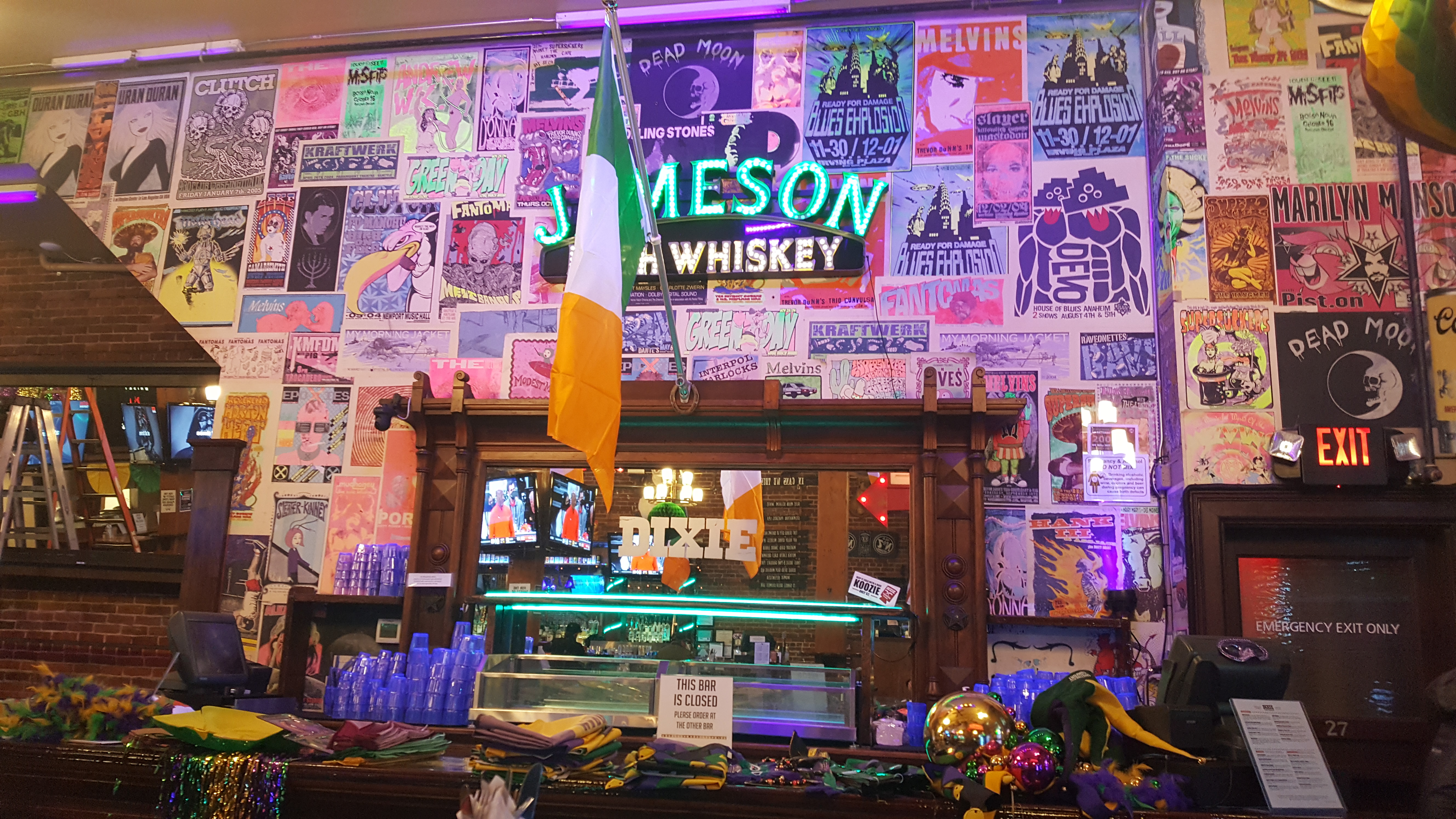
The bar's interior, 2022

In 2020, during the COVID-19 pandemic, Lenzen worked with the Old Town Community Association to advocate for a "night mayor" to "liaison between hospitality businesses and city government". He said the bar suffered economic loss and the neighborhood saw more crime during the pandemic. He also joined the Rose City Downtown Collective, described by KATU as "a group of downtown Portland businesses and organizations is asking for help in rebuilding 'the spirit' of the city's core, which has been hit hard by months of coronavirus restrictions and protests".

In 2021, Lenzen advocated for extended hours, and he and Dixie Tavern employees blocked off nearby streets, a service which had previously been provided by the city for security purposes. He was appreciative of the city's efforts to clean up streets ahead of the MLS Cup. He hoped the work would continue and said, "Here's a plea to all the people in charge of being able to get activation: we need this, what we've done today. We all need this. A vibrant downtown is important to the entire region."

In 2024, an intoxicated driver with a blood alcohol content of 0.251 who was at the Dixie Tavern the previous night crashed into another vehicle and killed an occupant. The estate of the deceased person filed a lawsuit against Dixie Tavern, alleging that the venue served a person who was visibly intoxicated.

Dixie Tavern hosted a pre-party for Portland's SantaCon in 2024.

== Reception ==
In 2014, Drew Tyson included Dixie Tavern in Thrillist's 2014 list of "Portland's 10 (Best?) Bad Decision Bars". The website's Pete Cottell included the bar in a 2015 list of "10 Portland Bars You Should Avoid Once You're 30".

Lizzy Acker included the bar in The Oregonian's 2017 list of "23 places to go dancing in Portland". Brooke Jackson-Glidden recommended Dixie Tavern in Eater Portland's 2020 overview of venues for a bachelorette party. She wrote, "Country fans know Dixie is the place to be for dancing, but the bar dips its toes into other styles of music so everyone can have a good time. Plus, Dixie can host big parties, for those looking for their own space among the ruckus."

== See also ==
- Culture of Portland, Oregon
