= Erika Roe =

British streaker

Erika Roe (born 30 December 1957), also known as the Twickenham Streaker, is a woman remembered for a topless run across the pitch of Twickenham Stadium in Twickenham suburb, within Greater London, England, during an England vs. Australia rugby union match on 2 January 1982. It has been described by the BBC as "perhaps the most famous of all streaks". Roe ran onto the field during half time, exposing her 40-inch (100 cm) breasts, which resulted in screams from the audience. Roe later attributed the inspiration for the streak to drinking alcohol.

== Aftermath ==
While Roe was not the first or the last streaker at an athletic event, in 2007 The Independent declared that her "memorable" streak made her a suitable icon to represent all such streakers in their article on sports interruptions. The event prompted web site Manchester Confidential to dub her "the most famous British streaker". She was subsequently paid £8,000 for modelling work.

Roe's continuing fame saw her appear on the British TV programmes After They Were Famous (1999) and '80s Mania (2001).

At the time of her streak she worked in a Petersfield, Hampshire bookstore. In a 2001 interview she commented "I now live happily in Portugal with my three amazing kids and a man who loves me" where they were operating a sweet potato farm. A 2024 interview describes her as a divorcee growing sweet potatoes and Protea flowering plants in the Algarve area.

She released a topless calendar in 2014 to raise money for a breast cancer charity. In March 2016, she appeared as a contestant on series three of The Island with Bear Grylls.
