= Keretapi Sarong =

Annual cultural event in Malaysia

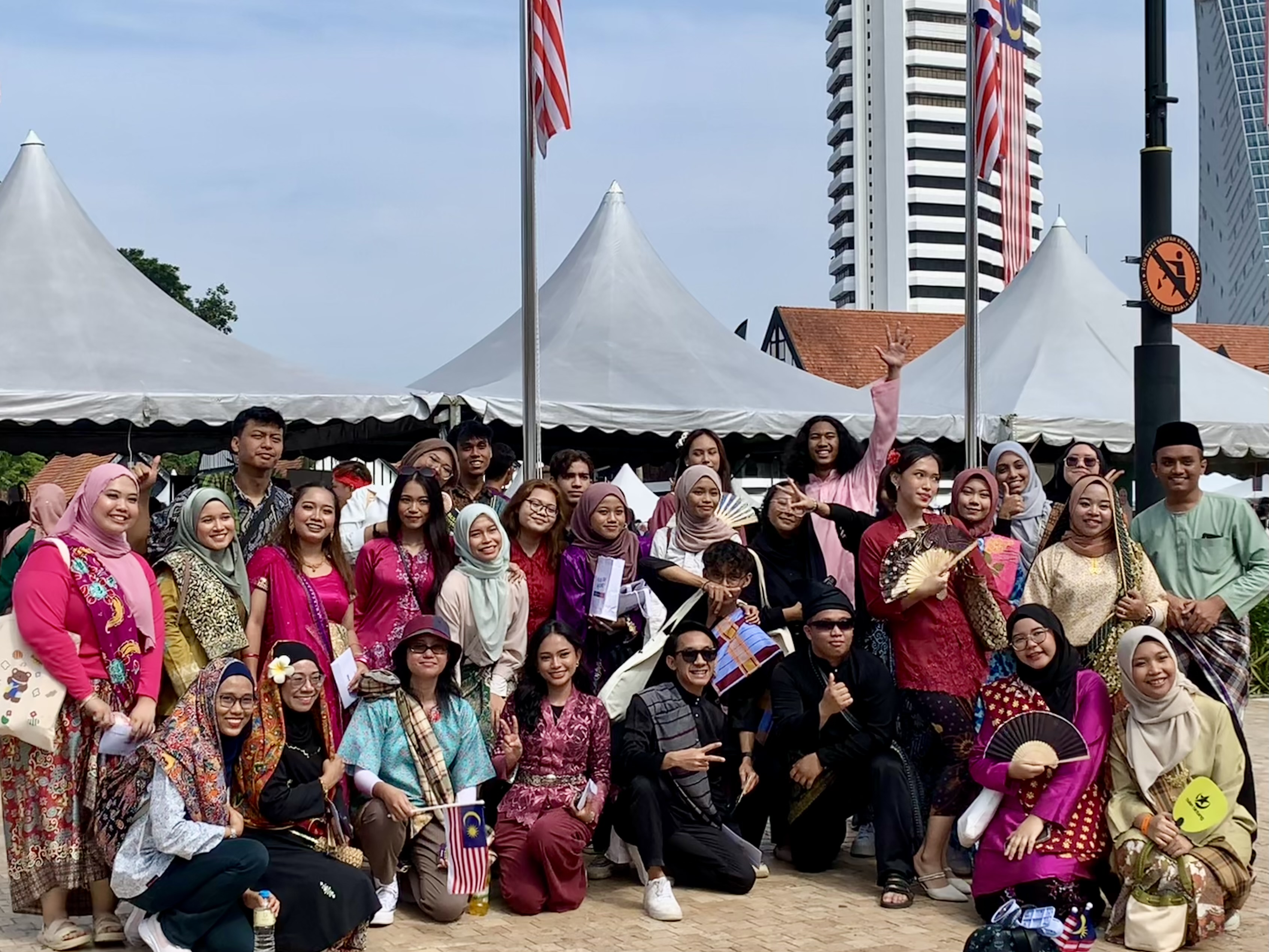
- Keretapi Sarong 2023
- Date: Malaysia Day (2017-2023); Saturday in September before Malaysia Day (2024-2025); Malaysia Day (2026)
- Venue: Major train stations in Klang Valley, Malaysia; and other countries
- Location: Kuala Lumpur, Malaysia; other cities and countries
- Organised by: Random Alphabet (2012-2016); LOCCO (2017-now)
- Goal: To promote culture and diversity of Malaysia during Malaysia Day (since 2017)
- Methods: Wearing traditional sarong while riding the train and gathering at the secret location

Keretapi Sarong is an annual flash mob event held across Malaysia, where the participants wear a traditional sarong while riding the train or rapid transit on certain days to promote Malaysian culture and diversity. The event was first held in 2012, stalled for three years, and revived with the new organizer.

== History ==
Keretapi Sarong was first introduced in the year 2012, inspired by No Pants Subway Ride flash mob in New York City in 2002 where the participants ride the subway without wearing pants for a day. The first organizer of the event is Random Alphabets.

In 2013, Keretapi Sarong was also being held overseas, including in London, Melbourne, Washington, D.C., Boston and Philadelphia. The 2014 edition also saw 12 cities holding the same event, such as Tokyo, Dublin, Amsterdam and London.

After the original event was not held for three years, the new organizer, Local Companion (LOCCO), revived the Keretapi Sarong flash mob event during Malaysia Day as an effort to promote the use of public transport and encourage wearing traditional attire, which is the sarong.

Keretapi Sarong was not held in 2020 and 2021 due to the COVID-19 pandemic in Malaysia.

The 2022 edition saw the popularity of the event with 5,000 participants as well as being held for the first time outside Kuala Lumpur, which is Ipoh. The 2023 edition is also being held in Johor Bahru, Ipoh and Kuala Terengganu, as well as overseas, like at Battersea Power Station in London.

== Keretapi Sarong in Kuala Lumpur ==
Year	Theme	"Secret Location"	Meet-up Stations	Ref
2012	n/a	n/a		
2013	n/a	n/a		
2014	n/a	n/a		
2015-2016	Not held			
2017	#SayangMalaysia	National Museum, Kuala Lumpur	KG09 Bandar Utama; SP29 Puchong Prima; KD09 KS02 KJ28 Subang Jaya; KJ01 Gombak; AG18 Ampang	
2018	n/a	Malaysia Tourism Centre (MaTiC), Kuala Lumpur	KG09 Bandar Utama; SP24 IOI Puchong Jaya; KD09 KS02 KJ28 Subang Jaya; KJ01 Gombak; AG18 Ampang	
2019	n/a	Independence Square, Kuala Lumpur	KG09 Bandar Utama; KB06 KG35 Kajang; KD09 KS02 KJ28 Subang Jaya; KJ1 Gombak; AG18 Ampang	
2020	Not held due to COVID-19 pandemic			
2021	Not held due to COVID-19 pandemic			
2022	Retro Kuala Lumpur	Pavilion Kuala Lumpur	KG09 Bandar Utama; KB06 KG35 Kajang; KD09 KS02 KJ28 Subang Jaya; KJ1 Gombak; AG18 Ampang; KA01 KJ15 KE1 KT1 KS01 KL Sentral; KT5 KLIA T1; KT3 Putrajaya & Cyberjaya	
2023	Ethnicity & Unity	Independence Square, Kuala Lumpur	KG09 Bandar Utama; KB06 KG35 Kajang; KD09 KS02 KJ28 Subang Jaya; KJ1 Gombak; AG18 Ampang; KA01 KJ15 KE1 KT1 KS01 KL Sentral; KT3 PY41 Putrajaya Sentral	
2024	Face of Malaysia	Malaysia Tourism Centre (MaTiC), Kuala Lumpur	KG10 TTDI; KB06 KG35 Kajang; KD09 KS02 KJ28 Subang Jaya; KJ1 Gombak; AG18 Ampang; KA01 KJ15 KE1 KT1 KS01 KL Sentral; KT3 PY41 Putrajaya Sentral; PY34 UPM; PY07 Sri Damansara Sentral	
2025	Serumpun	Raintree Plaza, The Exchange TRX	KG08 Mutiara Damansara; SP22 Kinrara BK5; KB06 KG35 Kajang; KD09 KS02 KJ28 Subang Jaya; KJ1 Gombak; AG18 Ampang; KA01 KJ15 KE1 KT1 KS01 KL Sentral; KT3 PY41 Putrajaya Sentral; PY34 UPM; PY07 Sri Damansara Sentral	

== Reactions ==
This program has been well received by the Malaysian train operator, Prasarana Malaysia, since the start of the event. It is also supported by the Ministry of Tourism, Arts, and Culture of Malaysia.
