= Slip dress =

Thin, usually bias-cut dress with narrow shoulder straps, similar to a woman's slip

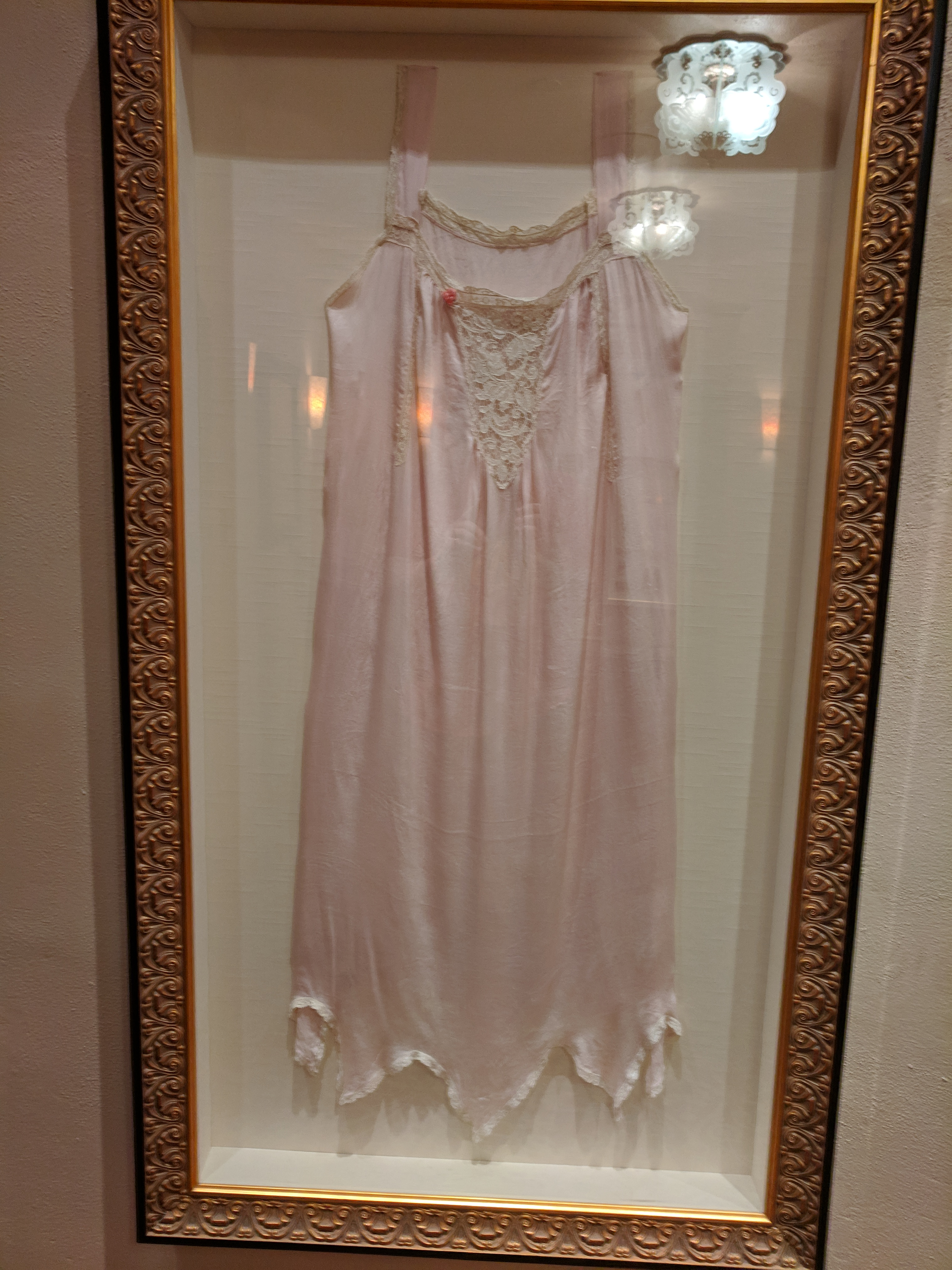
Slip dress at Plaza theatre

A slip dress is a woman's dress that closely resembles an underslip or petticoat. It is traditionally cut on the bias, with spaghetti straps. The slip dress looked like an undergarment, but was intended to be seen, and through the use of lace and sheer elements, offer glimpses of the body beneath. Designers associated with slip dresses include John Galliano, whose debut design for Dior was a lace-trimmed slip dress worn by Diana, Princess of Wales in 1996; Calvin Klein and Narciso Rodriguez.

== History ==
Slip dresses first became widely worn in the last decade of the 20th century, as part of the underwear-as-outerwear trend, when they were made from layered chiffon, polyester satins and charmeuse, and often trimmed with lace. The dresses typified the sartorial minimalism of the 1990s. The slip dress became associated with the decade's supermodels, notably Kate Moss, who garnered attention with a sheer version in 1993. Courtney Love's fondness for the style granted slip dresses grunge credibility. They were usually worn above the knee with opaque tights, leggings, or bike shorts which were seen below the bottom of the dress and a capped sleeved tee usually white or a capped sleeved bodysuit underneath. There were longer versions available but the shorter version was most popular.

The style enjoyed a renewed popularity starting in the late 2010s and continuing into the 2020s as part of a broader revival of 1990s fashion trends. The spring 2016 collections of both Yves Saint Laurent and Burberry featured the garment. Since then, slip dresses have been a red carpet staple. The Versace spring 2021 ready-to-wear collection included slip dresses with a beachy theme.
