= No Pants Day =

Annual event

No Pants (Note: In American English, pants correspond to trousers in British English.) Day is an annual event in various countries that became more widely celebrated in the 2000s. It is most often observed on the first Friday in May and involves publicly wearing only undergarments on the lower part of the body, not nudity. Except for making people laugh, the holiday typically serves no other purpose or agenda, but some organizers later used it to raise social issues.

== History ==
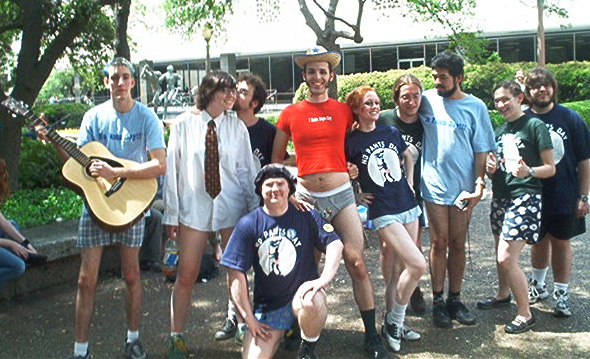
Participants (with no pants) in 2004 No Pants Day in Austin, Texas

No Pants Day originated as an informal, end of semester, celebration for students at the University of Texas at Austin. After about 15 years of being celebrated every May, the Knighthood of Buh, a small campus comedy club, declared it a student holiday in 2000. After the 2003 celebration, The Austin Chronicle called it the city's "best local holiday". The event gained traction in other states and several parts of Canada as well as France, Sweden, Australia, Finland, and Britain from their promotion.

Columnist Brian Shea, in 2004, reported that the official website for No Pants Day promised, "(w)hen large groups of people parade around in public without their pants, amazing things are about to happen. At the very least, you'll take your drab, wretched life a little less seriously, at least for one day" and that songs had been written to commemorate No Pants Day."

In 2011, footwear company Reebok used No Pants Day to launch its EasyTone line of shoes by hiring fitness models to walk around the Taipei subway during peak commute hours wearing formal business attire on top but without pants. The brief campaign generated nearly a hundred broadcast media clippings, and was covered by all Taiwanese news channels.

In 2012, Malaysian guerilla flash mob collective Random Alphabets organized its own take on No Pants Day with the Keretapi Sarong ("Sarong Train") in Kuala Lumpur where participants are encouraged to dress in the local sarong in place of the Western pants. The occasion has since taken place set around Malaysia Day under management by non-profit organization LOCCO since 2017.

In 2014, local radio station The Planet 106.7 sponsored Billings, Montana's 5th annual No Pants Day on January 23. The inaugural event in 2010 was scheduled when 28-degree weather and snow showers were predicted. Organizers encouraged people walk around town and do whatever they would otherwise normally do, just without the pants.

== Permitted apparel ==
In May 2008, the Idaho Statesman clarified that in Boise's first celebration of the event that the absence of "pants" (also known as trousers) include all garments typically worn below the waist, such as shorts, kilts, and skirts, but participants should wear "appropriately modest" undergarments. "I hope that no one uses this to be overly sexual or otherwise improper", said the event's organizer. Local principals discouraged students from participating during the school day, saying that any showing of undergarments would violate dress codes.

== Usage for social awareness ==
"I don't know if they're expecting like some rock of sorts
But I'm just tearing up the mic here in my boxer shorts
It's No Pants Day, and there's no hate"

— Canadian musician Andrew Huang in 2004

In 2004, Canadian music producer Andrew Huang recorded the song No Pants!, rapping as "MC Underwear" to celebrate the humor of No Pants Day, and launched the "Songs To Wear Pants To" website.

Although "the main thing is, just to have fun", organizers of the May 2008 inaugural event in Boise, Idaho focused attention on bus riding to raise awareness of public transit issues, similar to New York's annual No Pants Subway Ride, an event which the Associated Press called a "winter spinoff" of No Pants Day.

More than 25 cartoonists observed No Pants Day in 2021 as part of a coordinated effort by King Features Syndicate to support clothing charities like Dress for Success and community thrift shops disaffected by the COVID-19 pandemic. "Just the idea of No Pants Day, I think, is something that everybody can feel a little bit closer to this year than in previous years", said King Features comics editor Tea Fougner. Newspaper readers found on May 7, 2021, that many characters had been drawn with their pants removed in popular comic strips. Dennis the Menace made a brief appeal to contribute to children's clothing charity Room to Grow, while a Rae the Doe character was depicted making a donation of clothing. Blondie, Rhymes with Orange, and Zippy the Pinhead were also among the participating strips.

== See also ==
- No Pants Subway Ride
- Underwear as outerwear
- Undie Run
- Wear Pants to Church Day
- World Naked Gardening Day (celebrated the first Saturday in May)
