= Naked Pumpkin Run =

Seasonal nude running event

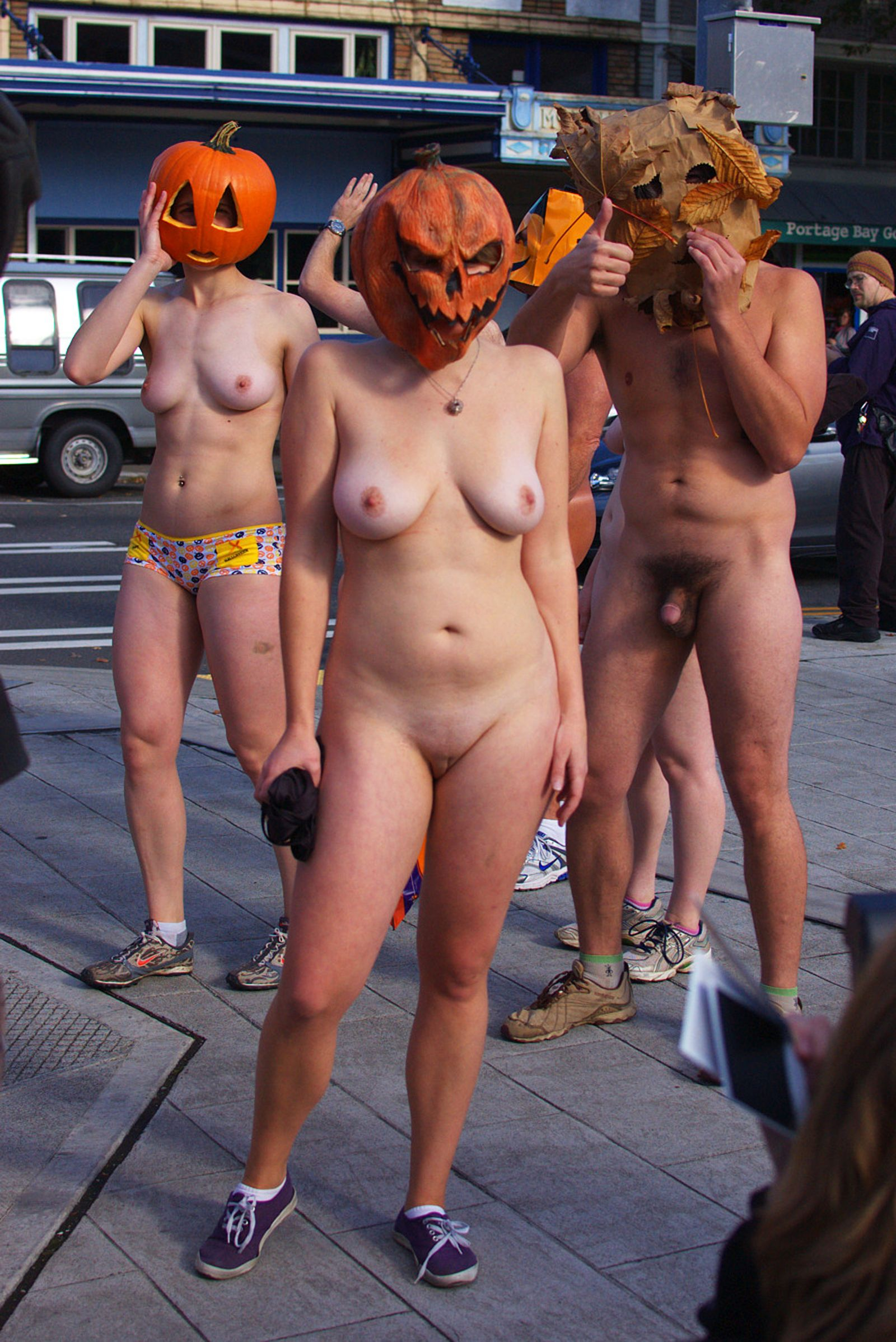
Naked Pumpkin Run, 2010

Naked Pumpkin Run is an annual event in certain United States municipalities where otherwise nude participants run a course through a town, their heads adorned with carved pumpkins. Runs have been held in Boulder, Colorado; Seattle, Washington; Portland, Oregon; and Arcata, California.

== History ==
The event can be traced to an unsuccessful 1974 Guinness World Record attempt by University of Colorado at Boulder students.

12 out of 150 participants were arrested and charged with indecent exposure at the event in 2008. In 2009, local police threatened participants with charges of indecent exposure and registration as a sex offender if they were arrested during the run. The few people who subsequently participated in the run wore enough clothing to avoid being arrested.

Runners in Hamilton, Ontario had their first Naked Pumpkin run on October 30, 2015.

== See also ==
- Naked Mile (event)
- Nude recreation
- Turkey trot
- Undie Run
