= Streaking =

Running naked through a public place

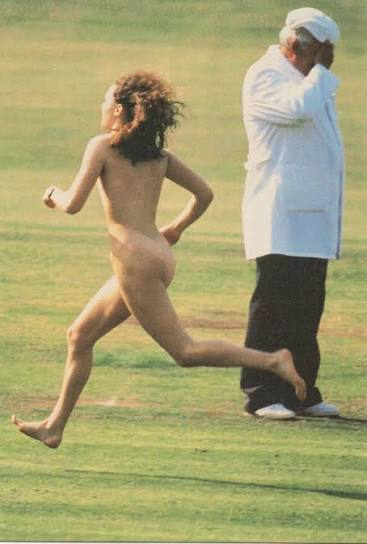
Streaking at sports event

Streaking is the act of running naked through a public area for publicity, for fun, as a prank, a dare, a form of protest, or to participate in a fad. In the western world, streaking has since the mid-20th century most often been associated with college students and sporting events, where it is intended as a harmless attention-seeking prank. Streakers are often pursued by sporting officials or the police.

== Definitions and etymology ==
The word has been used in its modern sense only since the 1960s. Before that, to streak in English since 1768 meant "to go quickly, to rush, to run at full speed", and was a re-spelling of streek: "to go quickly" (c. 1380); this in turn was originally a northern Middle English variant of stretch (c. 1250).

In December 1973, a graduate of Carleton College in Northfield, Minnesota wrote to Time magazine that the term "streaking" was coined because the nude students ran primarily during the winter months of January and February, and "unless one appeared as a streak against the landscape, the Minnesota winter was triumphant and streaker became statue." The school's newspaper, The Carletonian, used the term "streaking" as early as 1967, but initially in negative terms: "Examples of [Carleton's social problems] are the large number of departing female students, the rise of class spirit, low grades, streaking, destruction, drinking, and the popularity of rock dances."

== History ==
Historical forerunners of modern-day streakers include the neo-Adamites who travelled naked through towns and villages in medieval Europe, and the 17th-century Quaker Solomon Eccles, who went nude through the City of London with a burning brazier on his head.

At 7:00 PM on 5 July 1799, a man was arrested at the Mansion House, London, and sent to the Poultry Compter. He confirmed that he had accepted a wager of 10 guineas (equivalent to £1,037 in 2025) to run naked from Cornhill to Cheapside.

Fines of between £10 and £50 were imposed on streakers by British and Irish magistrates in the early 1970s. The offences used for prosecution were typically minor, such as the violation of park regulations. Nevertheless, the chief law in force against streaking in England and Wales at that time remained the 16th-century vagrancy law, for which the punishment in 1550 had been whipping.

=== In the United States ===
The first recorded incident of running naked in public by a college student in the United States occurred in 1804 at Washington College (now Washington and Lee University) when senior George William Crump was arrested for running naked through Lexington, Virginia, where the university is located. Crump was suspended for the academic session, but later went on to become a U.S. Congressman.

In June 1973, the press reported on a "streaking" trend at Michigan State University. In December 1973, Time magazine called streaking "a growing Los Angeles-area fad" that was "catching on among college students and other groups". A letter writer responded, "Let it be known that streakers have plagued the campus police at Notre Dame for the past decade", pointing out that a group of University of Notre Dame students sponsored a "Streakers' Olympics" in 1972.

In February 1974, the press began calling it a "streaking epidemic." By the first week of March, college campuses across the country were competing to set streaking records. On March 11, 1974, several Americans imported streaking to Japan, where a series of copycat incidents occurred over the next month.

The prominence of streaking in 1974 has been linked both to the sexual revolution and a conservative backlash against feminism and the campus protests of the late 1960s and early 1970s.

== On college campuses ==
=== United States ===
Colleges and universities with documented traditions of campus streaking include the University of Chicago (Polar Bear run), Denison University (Naked Week), Oberlin College, Pennsylvania State University, Wellesley College, the University of Virginia (Streaking the Lawn), Wheaton College (the "Kingdom Run"), and the University of North Carolina at Chapel Hill (Davis Library Streaking). Students streak in various stages of undress. Some are completely naked. Most prefer wearing socks and/or shoes. Female streakers often wear a thong or a g-string, and streak topless, and a few choose to wear a bra as well. Male streakers are mostly wearing nothing but a pair of shoes. Many streakers wear a mask nowadays since filming the event has gotten easier compared to the days these traditions started.

Carleton College is home to the streaking traditions Week of Streak (founded spring 2020) and Nudegressive. The week before finals, students streak each night at dusk to sundown at various locations around campus. These streaking locations become increasingly ambitious, or public, as the week goes on. Week of Streak culminates with Nudegressive, an event that takes place at midnight on the eve of Rotblatt with around 200 participants who streak a 1 mile loop through Carleton's arboretum followed by a nude dance party at the Hill of Three Oaks bonfire. Many students choose to also take a dip in the Boliou fountain.

Dartmouth College has two streaking-related challenges: The Ledyard Challenge, in which students swim naked across the Connecticut River and run nude back across the bridge, and the Blue Light Challenge, in which streaking students attempt to press the alarm on every one of the campus's blue light emergency phones. As of 2005, a Thursday Night Streaking Club regularly streaked at various events and public places.

In 1986, the University of Michigan's Naked Mile celebrated the last day of class with a group streak across campus along an approximate one-mile path. At the height of its popularity in the late 1990s, between 500 and 800 students participated, including several hundred females. Over 1,400 students participated one year and well over one thousand during another year. However, due to enforcement of public indecency laws and pressure from administration officials concerned about increasing spectator crowds and videotaping, participation declined. By 2001, a mere 24 students participated, signaling the effective end of the Naked Mile. Students were warned by college administrators that streakers would be arrested and required to register as sex offenders for life under Megan's Law.

The students at Union College held midnight "Pajama Parade" events in 1862, 1914 and several times in the 1950s. The real streaking tradition arrived at the campus in the 1990s in the form of a nocturnal lap around the Nott Memorial known as the "Naked Nott Run."

To celebrate the school year's first night of heavy rainfall, a well-known tradition called "First Rain" is enacted at the University of California, Santa Cruz by students who for the entirety of the day to midnight, run around campus nearly or completely nude. Beginning at Porter, the run proceeds throughout the other colleges.

At the University of Vermont, a naked bike ride is traditionally held at midnight at the end of each semester. Participants run, bike, unicycle, carry kayaks, push shopping carts, or pull sleds. The topic of the Naked Bike Ride has been a touchy one among UVM police, who have tried several times to do away with it. In 2011, Interim President John Bramley ended school funding for the event. This resulted in the student body creating the UVM Green Caps, a group of student volunteers stationed around campus throughout the evening for the safety of students.

At the University of North Carolina at Chapel Hill, students gather on the 8th floor of Davis Library the night before finals. At 12:00 AM, all students gathered on the 8th floor strip naked and run down the main stairwell and outside to the steps of Wilson Library. After reaching Wilson Library, the streakers sing the University's Alma Mater (Hark the Sound) and run back to the 8th floor of Davis Library. The university has made efforts to do away with the streaking by issuing statements and closing the 7th and 8th floors of Davis the night before exams. Despite these attempts, the streaking has continued.

=== The Philippines ===
At the University of the Philippines, members of the Alpha Phi Omega fraternity streak around the campus in an annual event known as the Oblation Run. The run started in 1977 to protest the banning of the movie, "Hubad na Bayani", which depicted human rights abuses in the martial law era. The event continued to occur as a protest action.

=== Spain ===
In 2011, the first nudist race took place at the University of Alicante (Spain).

== In sport ==
=== Australia ===
In the sport of cricket, it is not uncommon for a male streaker to run out to the field purely for shock and entertainment value or political purposes. The first known instance of streaking in cricket took place on 22 March 1974, the first day of the third test between Australia and New Zealand at Auckland. Half an hour before the end of the day's play, while New Zealand was batting, "a dark-haired young man" ran from near the sightscreen, through mid-wicket and disappeared between the stands near the square-leg boundary. The incident occurred quickly and police did not have time to react. Reports differ on whether the man was completely naked, with some accounts stating that he may have been wearing a flesh-coloured T-shirt. On the evening of the second day, while Australian batsman Ian Redpath was on strike, an "athletic young man" was caught on television cameras running across the ground on the leg side. The streaker ran to the men's restroom and was chased by police. When police entered the restroom, they found 20 people inside—all of whom were clothed—and authorities were unable to identify the streaker.

Another example was in the First Test of the Australia versus the I.C.C. World XI, when a rather drunken man darted out toward the field naked, shocking the Australian and World XI players, halting play until he was spear tackled to the ground by field personnel. In one notable incident in 1977, Australian test cricketer Greg Chappell spanked an invading streaker named Bruce McCauley with his cricket bat; McCauley then fell to the ground and was arrested by police.

Streaker at the West Coast Eagles–Collingwood AFL match 2014

Streaking became popular at Australian rules football matches in the 1980s, particularly Victorian Football League Grand Finals. The trend was a trend started by Adelaide stripper Helen D'Amico at the 1982 VFL Grand Final between Carlton and Richmond, in which D'Amico streaked while wearing only a Carlton scarf. At the 1988 VFL Grand Final, a fully naked woman streaked during the final quarter and was promptly arrested. In another Melbourne Demons grand final, the 2021 Grand final, held in Perth, a male streaker ran on to the ground wearing only his underwear. He was only on the ground for a few seconds before he was removed and arrested.

In a game against the Melbourne Storm at Olympic Park Stadium in 2007, a Brisbane Broncos fan streaked across the field waving his supporter jersey over his head. He was apprehended at the other side of the field to large applause.

During an NRL finals match between the Wests Tigers and the New Zealand Warriors at the Sydney Football Stadium on 16 September 2011, a streaker ran onto the playing field forcing the game to come to a halt as security guards attempted to apprehend the man.

During the final minutes of the third and deciding game of the 2013 State of Origin series, a streaker, Wati Holmwood, intruded naked upon the field, interrupting the play and possibly costing the Queensland team a try. He was tackled by security guards, escorted from the field and fined $5,500.

=== United Kingdom ===
The first instance of streaking in English football took place on 23 March 1974. Prior to the start of the league match between Arsenal and Manchester City at Arsenal Stadium, a middle-aged man named John Taylor ran around the field. He was eventually caught by three policemen, forcibly made to wear trousers, and removed from the stadium. Taylor was fined £10 by the North London Court the next day.

Michael O'Brien was the first-known streaker at a major sporting event when, on 20 April 1974, he ran out naked onto the ground of an England–France rugby union match at Twickenham. The 25-year-old Australian was captured by a policeman, PC Bruce Perry, who covered O'Brien's genitals with his police helmet. The photograph of O'Brien under arrest became one of the most reproduced photographs of a streaker.

One of the best-known instances of streaking occurred on 5 August 1975, when former Royal Navy cook Michael Angelow ran naked across Lord's during an Ashes Test. This was the first instance of streaking during a cricket match in England, and commonly mistakenly believed to be the first-ever instance of streaking in cricket.

In 1982, a woman named Erika Roe ran across the pitch of Twickenham Stadium in London, England, during an England–Australia rugby union match, exposing her 40-inch (100 cm) bust. It has been described by the BBC as "perhaps the most famous of all streaks."

Linsey Dawn McKenzie, an English glamour model, performed a topless streak at a televised England v. West Indies cricket match at Old Trafford in 1995. Wearing only a thong and a pair of trainers, she ran onto the field with the words "Only Teasing" written across her breasts.

In 1999, a female streaker named Yvonne Robb was arrested for kissing Tiger Woods on the 18th hole at Carnoustie.

On 22 March 2009, a female streaker ran onto the pitch brandishing a green flag during the televised match between London Irish and Northampton Saints. It was in front of the season's largest crowd away from Twickenham, with 21,000 fans bearing witness.

=== United States ===
In the 1970s, at the height of streaking's popularity, a male streaker who broke into the Augusta National golf course in Augusta, Georgia (albeit not while the Masters was in play), was shot with buckshot and slightly wounded.

In Super Bowl XXXVIII, streaker Mark Roberts disrupted the game by running onto the field. He was eventually leveled by New England Patriots linebacker Matt Chatham, and was subsequently apprehended. Despite the worldwide audience, this event was largely overshadowed due to that game's infamous halftime show in which Janet Jackson's nude breast was revealed due to what was called a "wardrobe malfunction". Roberts would return in 2007 during the first NFL regular season game held in England between the Miami Dolphins and New York Giants, streaking during the game at Wembley Stadium.

In the 2006 Winter Olympics, in Turin, Italy, Mark Roberts streaked again, this time interrupting the men's bronze medal curling match between the U.S. team and the UK team, wearing nothing but a strategically placed rubber chicken. For the 2008 Olympics in Beijing, officials warned visitors against streaking, among other forms of "bad behaviour".

During the 3rd quarter of Super Bowl LVIII, a fan ran onto the field and was apprehended by security. The streaker was not shown on CBS.

== In popular culture ==
The high point of streaking's pop culture significance was in 1974, when thousands of streaks took place around the world. A wide range of novelty products were produced to cash in on the fad, from buttons and patches to a wristwatch featuring a streaking Richard Nixon, in pink underwear that said "Too shy to streak." This is explored in an episode of the first season of That '70s Show.

Perhaps the most widely seen streaker in history was 34-year-old Robert Opel, who streaked across the stage of the Dorothy Chandler Pavilion in Los Angeles flashing a peace sign on national US television at the 46th Academy Awards in April 1974. Bemused host David Niven quipped, "Isn't it fascinating to think that probably the only laugh that man will ever get in his life is by stripping off and showing his shortcomings?" Later, evidence arose suggesting that Opel's appearance was facilitated as a publicity stunt by the show's producer Jack Haley Jr. Robert Metzler, the show's business manager, believed that the incident had been planned in some way; during the dress rehearsal Niven had asked Metzler's wife to borrow a pen so he could write down the famous line, which was thus not the ad-lib it appeared to be.

Ray Stevens wrote and performed "The Streak", a novelty song about a man who is "always making the news / wearing just his tennis shoes". The song reached number one on the Billboard Hot 100 in May 1974.

Parodied in a 6 May 1974 Peanuts comic strip, the character Snoopy, in his college big man on campus alter-ego Joe Cool; engages in the "latest campus fad" by removing his customary sunglasses and collar, then proceeds to go streaking by the fourth panel by appearing to be "naked" in doing so.

In 1981, Japanese coin-op manufacturer Shoei produced an arcade game called Streaking, a maze game in which a nude woman is being chased by police. It was distributed in the U.S. by Computer Games, Inc. as Streaker, and by Computer Kinetics Corp. as Stripper.

In the early 2000's, male and female streaker figurines were made for the Subuteo table soccer game by the owner of a UK Subuteo shop and sold on the internet.

In Bruce Weber's 2014 account of a bike ride across America Life Is a Wheel he recounts a memory of his friend Billy streaking across the campus of Clark University at the age of 18.

== Records ==
As of 2004, the record for the largest group streak was established at the University of Georgia with 1,543 simultaneous streakers on 7 March 1974.

== See also ==
- Naked Pumpkin Run
