= Spaghetti strap =

Very thin shoulder strap used to support women's clothing

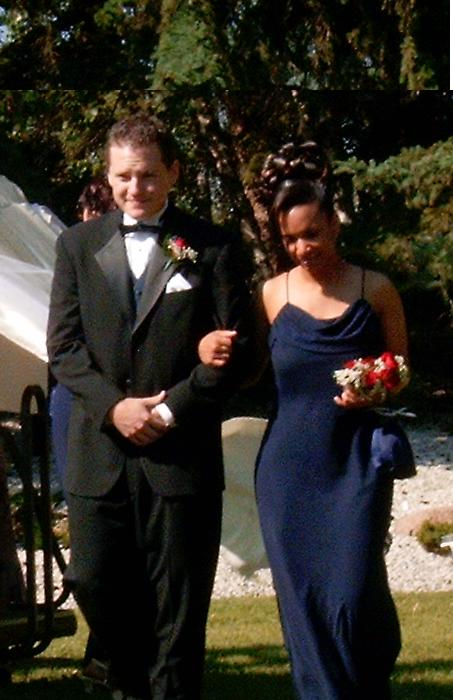
Groomsman in black tie and bridesmaid in evening gown with spaghetti straps.

A spaghetti strap (also called a noodle strap) is a very thin shoulder strap used to support clothing, while providing minimal shoulder straps over otherwise bare shoulders. It is commonly used in garments such as swimwear, camisoles, crop tops, brassieres, sundresses, cocktail dresses, evening gowns and bodycons, so-named for its resemblance to the thin pasta strings called spaghetti.

Spaghetti straps are fragile suspenders meant to support a light clothing.

== Dress codes ==
Spaghetti straps may not meet some dress codes. For example, they are not welcome at Ascot Racecourse as well as in traditionalist societies like Saudi Arabia or Afghanistan. Controversy has also arisen over debates to ban them in US schools.

== See also ==
- Halterneck
- Sleeveless shirt
