= Undie Run =

Running event in which participants wear only underwear

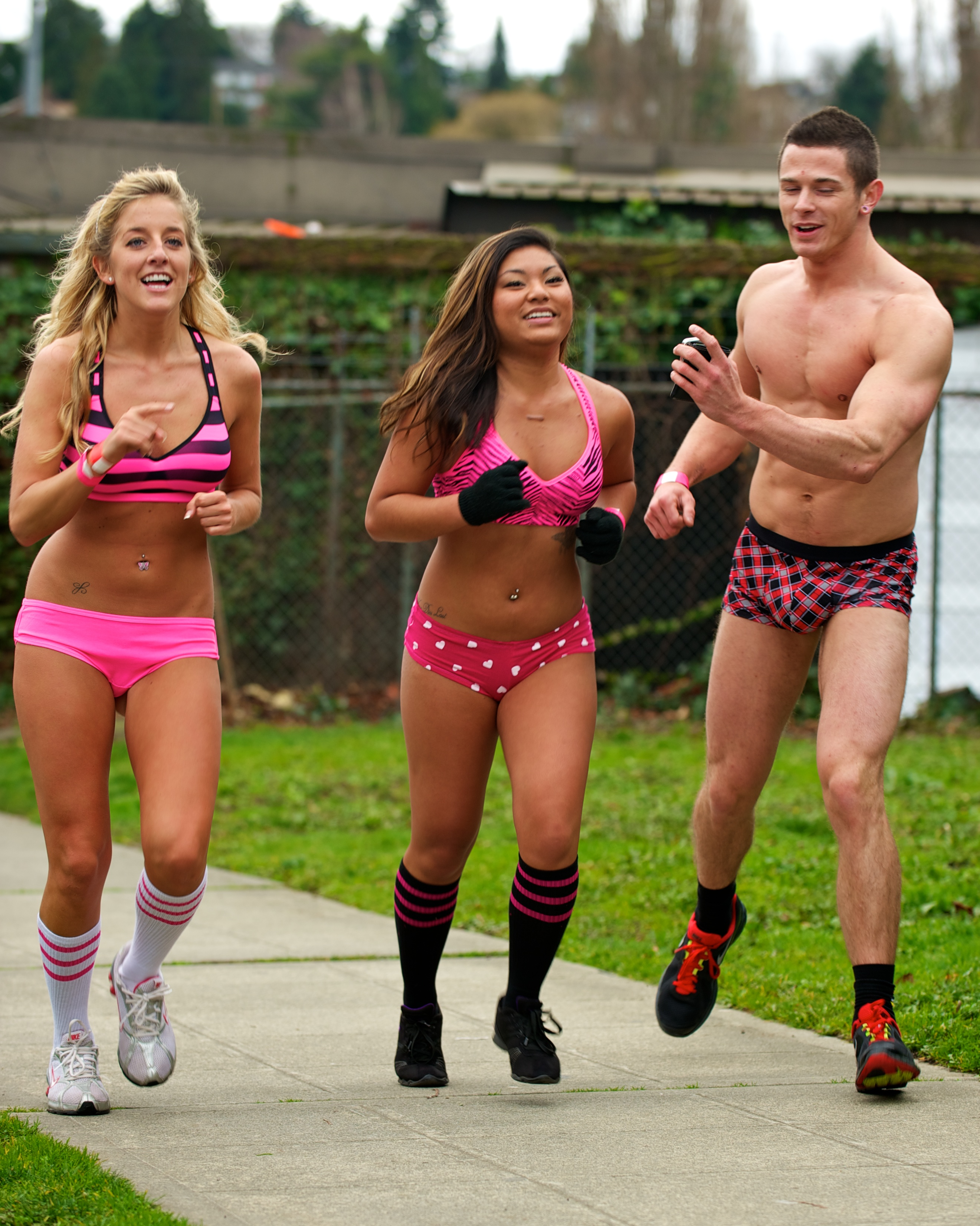
Cupid's Undie Run, Seattle, 2012

An Undie Run is an event where a large number of people disrobe until they are only wearing underwear, and then run. The site of Undie Runs are typically college campuses, but they may occur on other sites such as streets. Undie Runs may be purely for entertainment, a form of protest, or as with the ASU Undie Run, fund-raising for charitable purposes. It is reported that the Guinness Book of World Records considers the Undie Run that took place on September 24, 2011, in Salt Lake City, Utah, United States to have had a record number of participants. There were 2,270 participants in that Undie Run, which was held to protest Utah's conservative laws. COED Magazine, a magazine in the United States marketed to college students, has reported that Undie Runs are the "number one university sanctioned event".

== History ==
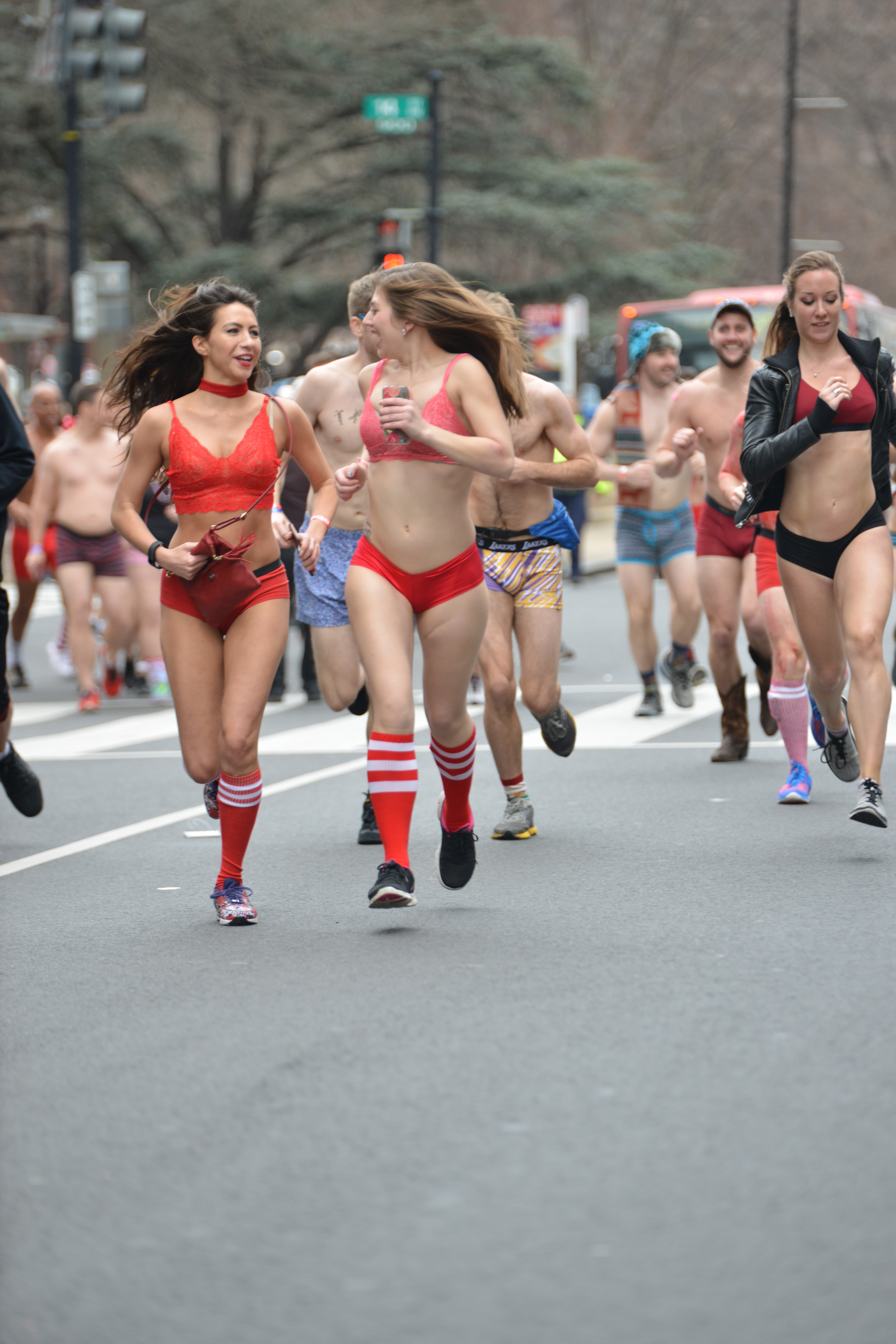
Cupid's Undie Run, Washington, D.C., 2017

One of the earliest known Undie Runs was started by student Eric Whitehead at UCLA in the fall of 2001.

== Universities in North America with Undie Run traditions ==
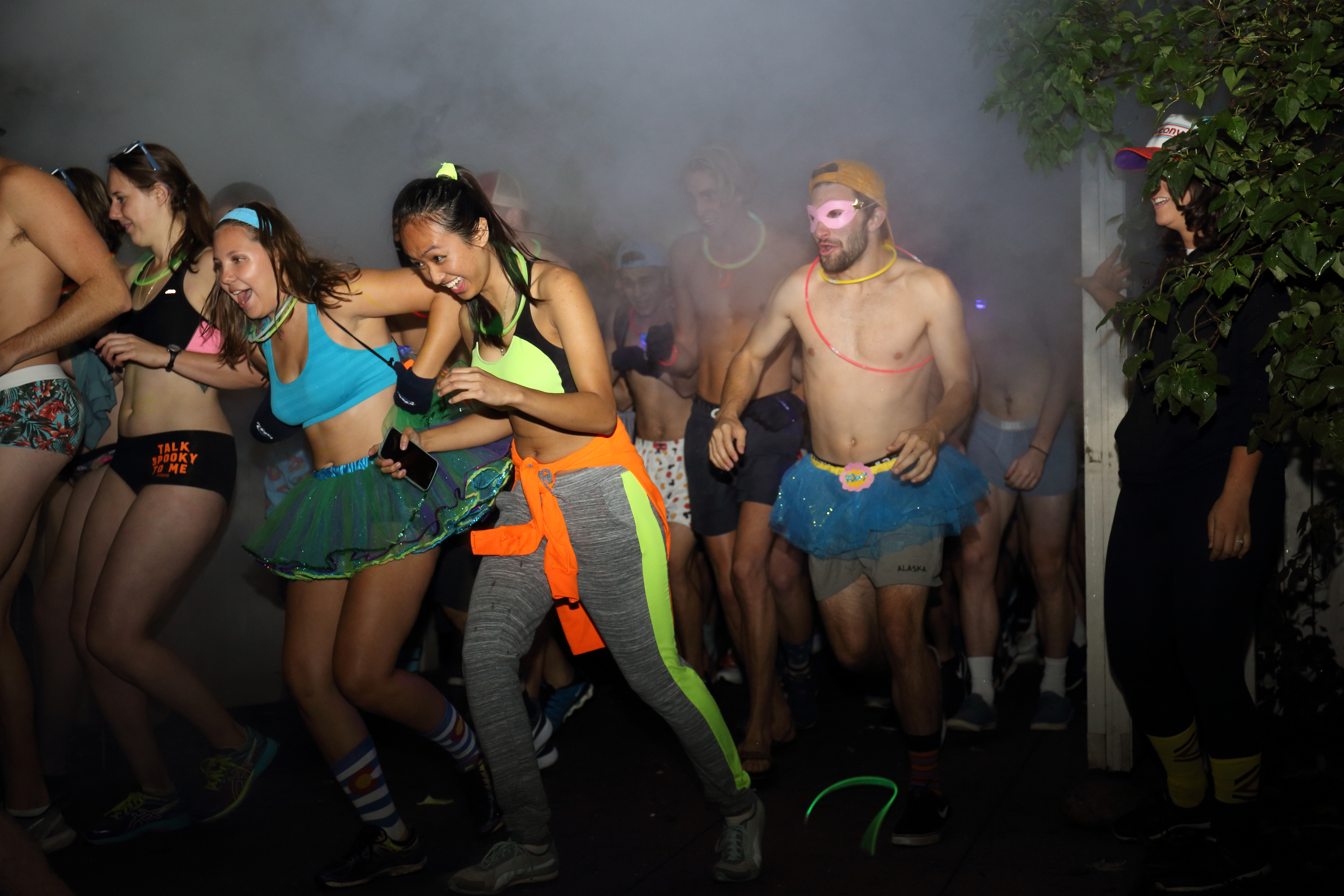
Nearly Naked Mile, University of Colorado at Boulder, 2017

Arizona

- Arizona State University (ended 4/28/15)
- University of Arizona

British Columbia

- University of British Columbia

California

- California State University, Chico
- California State University, Fullerton
- University of California, Irvine
- California State University, Long Beach
- University of California, Los Angeles
- Chapman University, Orange, California
- University of California, San Diego
- San Diego State University
- University of California, Santa Barbara
- University of Southern California

Colorado

- Colorado State University

Florida

- University of Florida

Kansas

- University of Kansas

Kentucky

- University of Kentucky

Massachusetts

- Boston College
- Northeastern University

Montana

- University of Montana – Missoula

Nevada

- University of Nevada, Las Vegas
- University of Nevada, Reno

New Mexico

- University of New Mexico

New York

- New York University

Oregon

- Oregon State University

Texas

- University of Texas, Austin

Washington

- University of Washington

Wisconsin

- University of Wisconsin

== See also ==
- Naked Mile (event)
- Naked Pumpkin Run
- No Pants Subway Ride
- Underwear as outerwear
