= May Day (Washington College) =

Washington College tradition

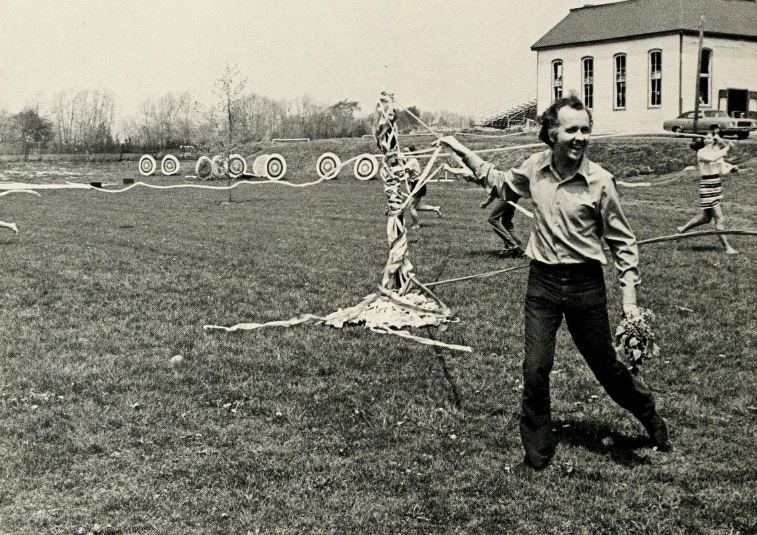
Bennett Lamond celebrating May Day in 1973

The celebration of May Day is a tradition at Washington College in Chestertown, Maryland. Each year, on the nights of April 30 and May 1, students from the college run naked around the flag pole on the campus green.

The tradition began in 1967 after Bennett Lamond, a professor of English, took his freshman English class out to the campus green where they erected a maypole, drank wine, and ate strawberries. Later that night, male students moved the maypole, undressed and danced.

Throughout the 1960s and 70s, students streaked during the day as well as around the flag pole at night. In the 1970s, a case of beer was given to the first male and female students to walk into the liquor store across the street naked. One student, Peter "Miami" Abronski, was arrested in 1978 for indecent exposure and disturbing the peace. He was taken to the county jail, the student population following the police car and congregating outside the jail, refusing to leave until Abronski was released. The situation calmed down when the Dean of Men negotiated the release of the student.

The tradition continued throughout the 1980s and '90s. Until the early 2000s, it was common to see students naked in the town or campus during the day. In recent years, the student body have toned down the celebration, partly owing to the introduction of camera phones and the Internet. Clothing stays on until midnight, when students strip and dance around the flagpole. The school discourages nude May Day celebrations, but its public safety officers are on duty for the event.

== References and bibliography ==
- Barron's (2006). Barron's Profiles of American Colleges (27 ed.). Barron's Educational Series. ISBN 978-0-7641-7903-7.
- Duck, Michael (2006). "May Day! May Day! Getting naked, or a cry for help?". Crunchable.
- Haislip, Lindsay (April 2011). "May Day: The Naked Truth". The Elm. Washington College.
- Janega, Liz (December 2011). "Fortnightly: Living on The Avenue". The Chestertown Spy.
- Maraniss, David A; Bouchard, Joseph E (May 1978). "Streaking Into Chestertown's Jail; Chestertown Streakers Have Town in an Uproar". Washington Post.
- Thompson, William L (2000). Washington: the College at Chester. Literary House Press. ISBN 0937692166.
- Walters, Anne K (2006). "Naturel History". The Chronicle of Higher Education. 52 (35).
