= No Pants Subway Ride =

Annual event

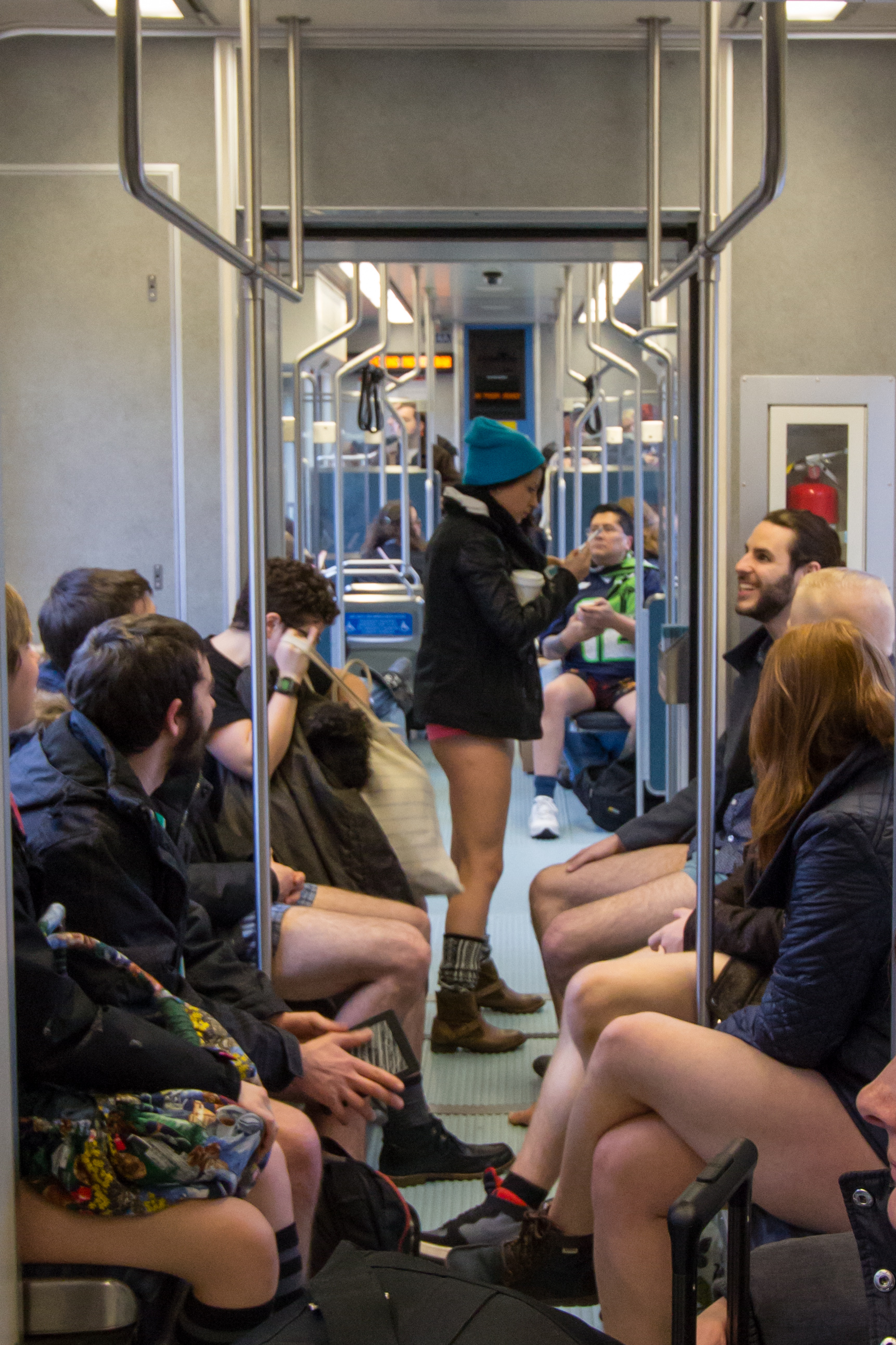
Participants of No Pants Subway Ride inside a Seattle Light Rail train, Seattle, USA, 2015

The No Pants Subway Ride (UK: No Trousers on the Tube Ride) is an annual event where a group of people take a ride on rapid transit public transport trains while not wearing trousers. Beginning in New York in 2002, the event had spread worldwide to as many as sixty cities as of 2013.

== History ==
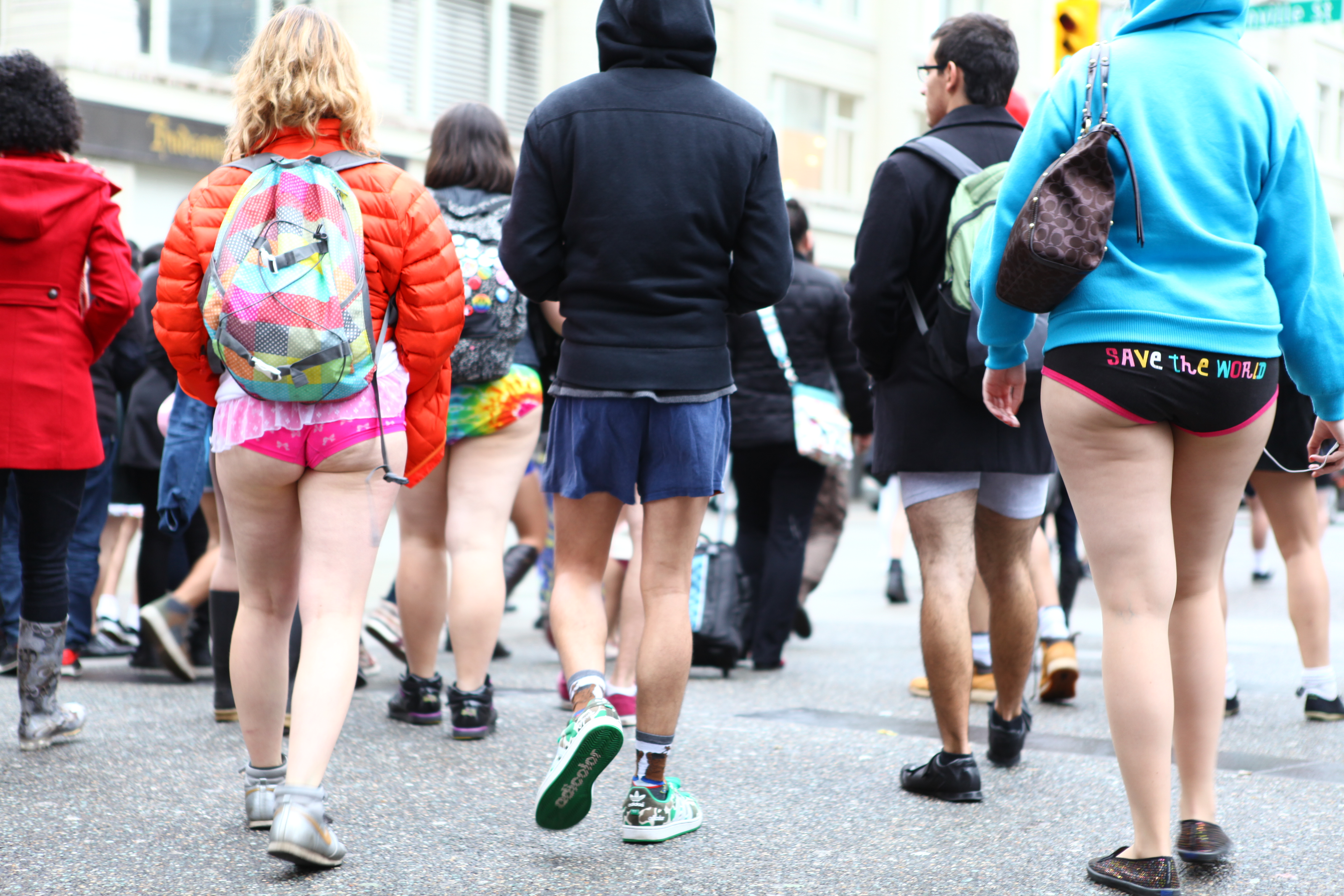
People leaving the SkyTrain station, wearing underwear, Vancouver, Canada, 2012

The annual No Pants Subway Ride event is organized by Improv Everywhere, and has coordinators in cities around the world. It takes place each year in early January; the date is announced in early December on Improv Everywhere's site.

The first No Pants Subway Ride began with seven riders in 2002 on the New York City Subway. In 2006, 150 people participated in New York City. During that event, eight were handcuffed for disorderly conduct, but the charges were later dismissed. For 2013, sixty cities had coordinators.

In January 2016, the event took place for the first time in Russia on the Moscow Metro. The participants were investigated by the police under the offense of the "instigating of mass public disorder", however there are opinions the accusations would not stand ground, since the organizers' goal was to make people laugh.

In January 2018, The Guardian published a photo montage of participants in the subways of some of the sixty cities worldwide, calling the event, "International No Pants Day".

Celebrations in 2021 and the following years were cancelled due to the COVID-19 pandemic, but were resumed in 2025, though apparently not in New York.

== See also ==
- No Pants Day
- No Pants MAX Ride, Portland, Oregon, U.S.
- Undie Run
- World Naked Bike Ride
