= Gwen Davis =

American poet (1936–2025)

- Born: May 11, 1934; Pittsburgh, Pennsylvania, U.S.
- Died: April 4, 2023 (aged 88); New York City, New York
- Education: Bryn Mawr College; Stanford University
- Occupations: Novelist; playwright; screenwriter; songwriter; journalist; poet
- Website: theonlygwen.com

Gwen Davis (May 11, 1934 – April 4, 2023) was an American novelist, playwright, screenwriter, songwriter, journalist and poet.

Davis has written eighteen novels, including the bestseller The Pretenders. She has also written about travel for the Wall Street Journal Europe, for online publications such as the Huffington Post, maintained a popular personal blog, Report from the Front, and a blog reviewing Broadway theater productions, Will Blog for Broadway.

Davis died on April 4, 2023, at the age of 88. She leaves behind a son and two grandchildren.

== Life ==
Davis was born in Pittsburgh, Pennsylvania and grew up in New York City, in Manhattan. Her parents were divorced. Her father, real estate developer Lew Davis, later served as mayor of Tucson, winning office in 1961. Her parents' separation when she was five affected her the rest of her life. She attended Bryn Mawr College. In 1954, at the age of eighteen, she went to Paris to study music and sang in a nightclub there until she gave into her mother's pleas to return to the U.S. She moved to California and continued singing, performing at the Purple Onion. She also obtained a master's degree in Creative Writing from Stanford University.

She was part of the Hollywood social scene from the late 1950s, coming into contact with a wide range of celebrities and befriending Dennis Hopper and many others. Some of her experiences inspired her first novel, Naked in Babylon. She married businessman and producer Don Mitchell, with whom she had two children, a daughter and a son. One of the Mitchells' mocking Academy Awards parties was the subject of a Time magazine article in 1970, which mentioned some of the celebrities—Shirley MacLaine, Zsa Zsa Gabor, Lee Marvin and others—Davis and Mitchell counted among their friends. She scripted a famous movie, What a Way to Go, and wrote a play produced on Broadway, The Best Laid Plans.

Davis continued to write. She traveled widely and has lived in Spain, Paris, Rome, London, Venice, New York and Hollywood. She has returned from living in Bali, Indonesia and was living between New York, and Beverly Hills.

== Touching lawsuits ==
Touching (1971) was not a bestselling novel, but resulted in controversial lawsuits. Davis spent twenty hours at Sandstone, a Topanga Canyon therapy center run by E. Paul Bindrim, known as the "father of Nude Psychotherapy". Bindrim, once nearly kicked out of the American Psychological Association, was known for holding what he called "nude marathons"—several clients were "placed in a warm pool for long sessions of touching and massaging, talking and sometimes shouting or acting out rage". After the novel was published, Bindrim sued Davis and Doubleday & Company for libel, on the grounds that it had defamed him.

Davis claimed she had used her real-life experiences to inspire fiction, but that Bindrim was not the psychologist in her fictional story, and did not resemble him—the character she depicted was overweight, looked like Santa Claus, and had a Ph.D. When the case came to trial, Bindrim, who had previously been bald and clean shaven, and who held only a master's degree, had by then gained weight, grown a white beard, and been granted a Ph.D. from International College in Westwood, California. (Founded in 1970, International College claimed it had "no classrooms, no lecture halls, no resident faculty." An unaccredited institution, it is now out of existence.) These changes made him appear like the psychologist in the book. He won his lawsuit against Davis and her publisher, Doubleday. Doubleday then sued Davis for not disclosing her contractual agreement with Bindrim not to write about the psychotherapy event. Because of the Bindrin precedent, American novelists in America became very concerned about the possibility of lawsuits against writers who used real people as the basis for their fiction. Eventually, Davis settled the lawsuit for an undisclosed amount.

== Bibliography ==
- Naked in Babylon, 1960
- Someone's in the Kitchen with Dinah, 1962
- The War Babies, 1966
- Sweet William, 1967
- The Pretenders, 1969
- Touching, 1971
- Kingdom Come, 1972
- Changes, 1973
- The Motherland, 1974
- How to Survive in Suburbia When Your Heart's in the Himalayas, 1976
- The Aristocrats, 1977
- Ladies in Waiting, 1979
- Marriage, 1981
- Romance, 1983
- Silk Lady, 1986
- The Princess and the Pauper: An Erotic Fairy Tale, 1989
- Jade, 1991
- Happy at the Bel Air, 1996
- West of Paradise, 1998
- Lovesong, 2000
- Scandal, 2011
- The Daughter of God, 2012

== Film and television writing credits ==
- "Desperate Intruder," 1983 (TV)
- "Better Late Than Never," 1982
- "What a Way to Go!," 1964

== Television and film roles and appearances ==
Davis appeared in Rich and Famous, 1981, as a party guest. She was interviewed many times on The Tonight Show Starring Johnny Carson in 1971–1972, and on David Frost and the Virginia Graham Show.
