= Naturism in the United States =

Social nudity in the United States

Naturism in the United States is the practice of social nudity as a lifestyle that seeks an alternative to the majority view of American society that considers nakedness and sexuality to be taboo based upon the legacy of Puritan and Victorian attitudes.

Enthusiasm for naturism began in the late 1920s with the establishment of members-only communities where naturists could gather to socialize and enjoy recreation without clothing in an environment that was no more sexual than that experienced while clothed. In later decades some groups began advocating for more general acceptance, and the opening up of public land to clothing-optional recreation. The mainstream American view of nude recreation (more often referred to as nudism than naturism) is that it is "tolerable deviant leisure activity" classified with moderate drinking and gambling. Psychologists Jessica Hamblen and Kim Mueser list "going naked" among over 250 other pleasurable activities in a book about aiding mental wellbeing in the context of disaster aftermath.

== History ==
Organized nudism in American society could be traced to 1929 when three German immigrants, part of the German social movement freikörperkultur, discussed the possibility of establishing nudism in the United States. One of them, Kurt Barthel, later founded the American League for Physical Culture (LPC). In 1932, Barthel founded Sky Farm, the first nudist camp in the United States, located in New Jersey. LPC changed its name to American Sunbathing Association (ASA) in 1931 and to the American Association for Nude Recreation (AANR) in 1995, and is now headquartered in Kissimmee, Florida.

Two members of LPC, Katherine and Herman Soshinki, founded the American Gymnosophical Association, and later started the Rock Lodge Club also in New Jersey.

=== Public opinion ===
A New York Times article in the summer of 1974 noted the number of nude beaches and other signs that American attitudes and behaviors regarding nudity were approaching the openness associated with Europeans. In addition to public nudity, some people stated that they are more likely to be nude in and around their homes. Psychologists interviewed thought this was part of a general trend away from prudishness that would continue. By the 1990s, although public opinions regarding sexuality continued to be liberal, attitudes toward public nudity were generally negative.

== National naturist organizations ==
=== American Association for Nude Recreation ===
The American Association for Nude Recreation (AANR) is a non-profit membership organization promoting the benefits of naturism. In 2001 it had grown to the world's largest naturist organization, with over 50,000 individual members and more than 230 affiliated clubs, resorts, and campgrounds. Headquartered in Kissimmee, Florida, AANR has regional branches responsible for local clubs and political activities. Although descending from the original social activist organizations of the 1930s, AANR has become more integrated with the mainstream American tourism and travel industries while retaining the language promoting naturism as healthy, family-oriented, and a "return to nature". However, many naturist resorts have the amenities, including beauty salons, restaurants, bars, and nightclubs, that upper-class patrons have come to expect. And although clothing, a universal indicator of status is absent, other status symbols including jewelry and cars are on display. AANR maintains a presence at state lobbying events, not to advocate for new legislation but to make lawmakers aware of any action that they take which may have unintended consequences on the nude recreation industry, which generates billions nationwide.

=== The Naturist Society ===
The Naturist Society (TNS) is an American naturist membership organization (LLC) founded in 1980 and based in Oshkosh, Wisconsin, United States by Lee Baxandall. Membership includes individuals, groups and recreational businesses. Its stated purpose is to provide "communication and coordination for the clothes-optional recreation movement as a natural solution to many problems of modern living. Believes that 'body acceptance is the idea, nude recreation is the way'. Conducts research programs, speakers' bureau, and specialized education."

In the 1990s, TNS established two nonprofit adjunct organizations, governed by a board of directors elected by the TNS membership: The Naturist Action Committee (NAC), its political and legislative lobbying adjunct, and the Naturist Education Foundation (NEF). NAC advocates for the acceptance of skinny-dipping and nude sunbathing at designated clothing-optional public beaches. A 2006 Roper Poll commissioned by the NEF found that 74% of Americans accept this idea.

TNS publishes a quarterly magazine Nude & Natural (also called N magazine) which contains articles on naturist activities and issues related to naturism. Photographs in the magazine seek to represent a full range of naturist participants. NAC publishes a newsletter and NEF publishes books on particular naturist topics.

== Events ==
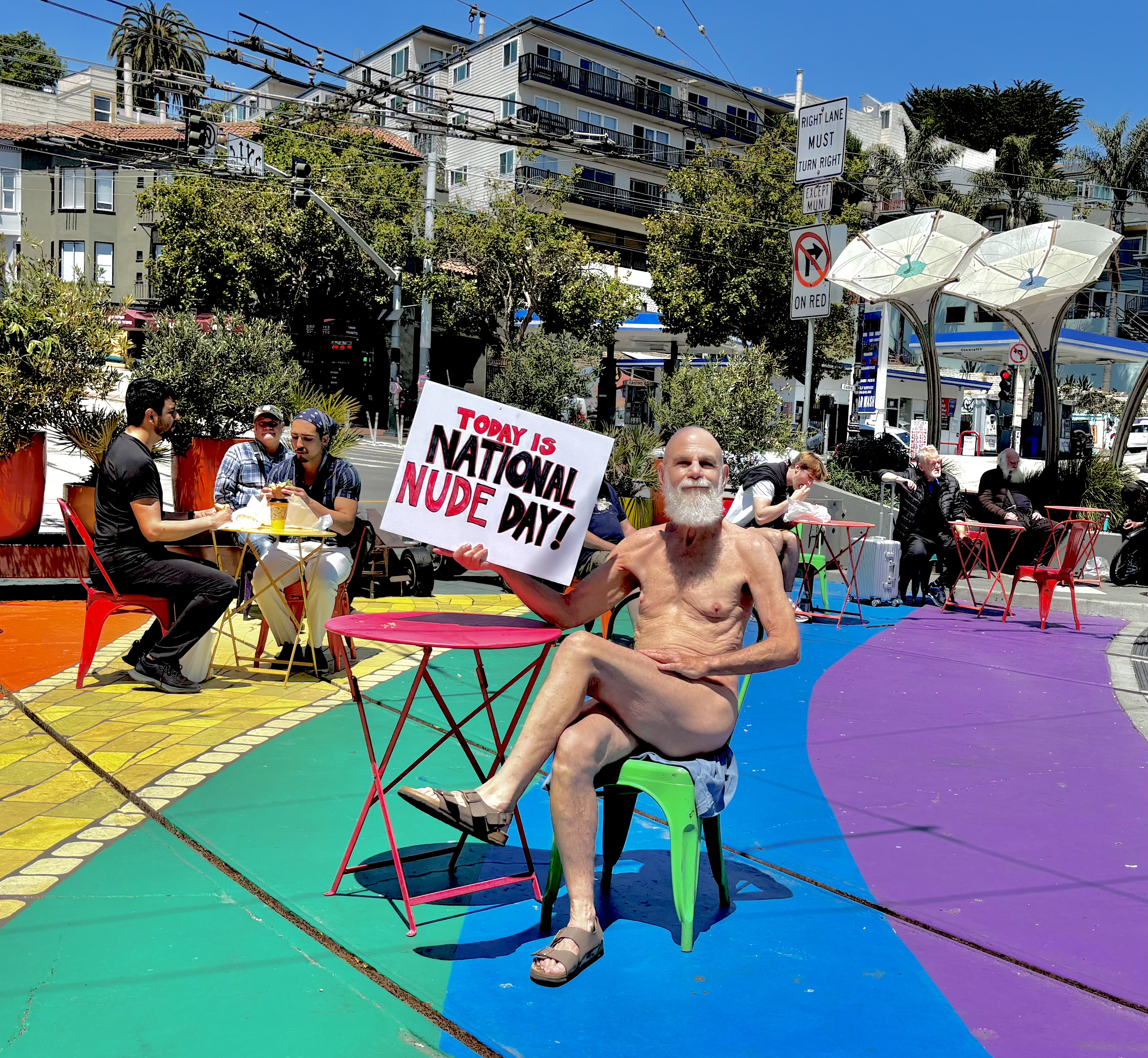
A nude man sitting and holding a placard on National Nude Day 2025

July 14 is National Nude Day, a day that celebrates naturism and nudism (it is not an officially observed holiday).

== Local regulation of public nudity ==
Every state in the US has a statute or case law prohibiting indecent exposure or public lewdness. In general, it is indecent for a person to expose their genitals (private parts) for sexual gratification or to cause others to be offended or alarmed. For some laws, it is the perpetrator's intent that defines indecency, in others it is the response of an ordinary citizen. Lewdness is explicitly sexual behavior beyond mere exposure, and may include sexual activity in public with or without nudity. The Louisiana law has a lengthy list of prohibited acts. Both indecency and lewdness become serious crimes if committed in the presence of a minor, age being defined in the law. Indecent exposure does not apply in public spaces where removing one's clothes is expected, such as in a locker room, if the behavior is within the locally understood norms.

Designating a beach or other recreational area as "clothing optional" is recognizing that being nude for swimming and sunbathing is not always indecent or lewd. This is also the basis for designating a public space as clothing optional for a particular event.

=== San Francisco ===
Although arrests might have been made on days when few were nude, tolerance for public nudity in San Francisco parks began in the late 1960s due to large groups of hippies dancing nude every Sunday in Speedway Meadow in Golden Gate Park, which continued into the 1970s. In September 2011, San Francisco city supervisor Scott Wiener introduced an ordinance to put certain restrictions on public nudity in response to complaints about a group who regularly gathered at an outdoor plaza in the Castro. The announcement prompted additional individuals to be nude in protest, which also attracted tourists. A suit to block the ordinance was rejected by a federal judge. The ordinance passed on November 20, 2012, went into effect on February 1, 2013, prompting additional protestors who were arrested. The law banned public nudity but exempted children under five and participants in a parade or festival; and the prohibition included only "genitals, perineum, or anal region", thus not prohibiting women baring their breasts. Since 2012, nudist events are still held in the city with a permit.

=== Seattle ===
Social nudity has some acceptance in Seattle with a number of beaches where nudity is common, most notably Denny-Blaine Park where nude use began in the 1960s. After decades of mixed enforcement, the city's law criminalizing nudity was struck down in 1990 on First Amendment grounds; the city repealed the law four years later. Washington State still has indecent exposure laws in effect; however, these are limited to conduct that the naked person knows is "likely to cause reasonable affront or alarm."

=== Other jurisdictions ===
A similar law exists in Oregon, but local jurisdictions and federal parks have their own restrictions, including bans on adult nudity.

In Florida, Haulover Beach in Miami-Dade County is officially designated as clothing optional.

In California, at least four of the establishments that existed in 1994 have since ceased operations. Southern California now hosts only three active landed clubs.

=== Topfreedom ===
Topfreedom is explicitly prohibited in only three states, Indiana, Tennessee and Utah. In others it is permitted, or the laws are ambiguous.

In New York State, it is not illegal for women to expose their breasts anywhere, but laws regarding disorderly conduct may be applied.

== See also ==
- Issues in social nudity
- List of public outdoor clothes free places
