= Kurt Barthel =

American naturism activist

Kurth Barthel
- Born: 1884
- Died: 1969 (aged 84–85)
- Occupation: Activist
- Years active: 1929-1969
- Known for: Establishing naturism in the United States; founding Sky Farm

Kurt Barthel (1884–1969) is the father of the modern United States nudist movement.

== Biography ==
He began the American League for Physical Culture in 1929 with an ad, first in the leading German nudist magazines published in Berlin by Robert Laurer "Lichtland" (Light Land) and "Lachendes Leben" (Laughing Life), then later in a newspaper seeking like-minded folks. The first organized nudist outing was held on Labor Day 1929. There were seven people in attendance, three women and four men, all but one between the ages of 20 and 27. The first outing was held in the Hudson Highlands in upstate New York. The American League for Physical Culture was organized in the fall of 1929 and took part in the beginning of the American nudist movement. The members of the ALPC visited leased farms in Westchester County in the summer and participated in gymnastics in rented gymnasiums and pools in the city in winter.

About 1930 three members stepped out of the ALPC and formed their own groups, one of whom formed the American Gymnosophical Association which shortly thereafter leased Rock Lodge Club in Stockholm, New Jersey. The American Sunbathing Association (ASA) — now called the American Association for Nude Recreation (AANR) — was an outgrowth or spin off from ALPC.

Another who played a part in the United States nudist movement was Dr. Maurice Parmelee, who took part in the founding of the American Gymnosophical Association and published the 1927 book The New Gymnosophy in New York whose title was changed to Nudism In Modern Life in later editions. The first copies of the book were sold under the counter by a large reputable book seller in New York City.

== Sky Farm ==
Barthel founded America's first official nudist camp in New Jersey, in May, 1932 when nudists and nudism were not accepted at all by the American public, during the Great Depression. Sky Farm continues to function as a member owned co-operative club.

In a newspaper article it is stated that in 1933 the American League, having a post office box for a New York address, was buying a farm in New Jersey that had been visited and approved by the chief of police, but would not divulge its location and the American Gymnosophical Association, having an office in Manhattan, New York had leased land in the Catskills, New York and a 60-acre (240,000 m^{2}) farm nearer to New York City. The American Gymnosophical Associates had substantial foundation at Rock Lodge. Rock Lodge Club continues to function as a member owned co-operative club.

== See also ==
- The Naturist Society
- American Association for Nude Recreation
- American Gymnosophical Association
- Clothes free organizations
