= Derrick Davenport =

American model (born 1978)

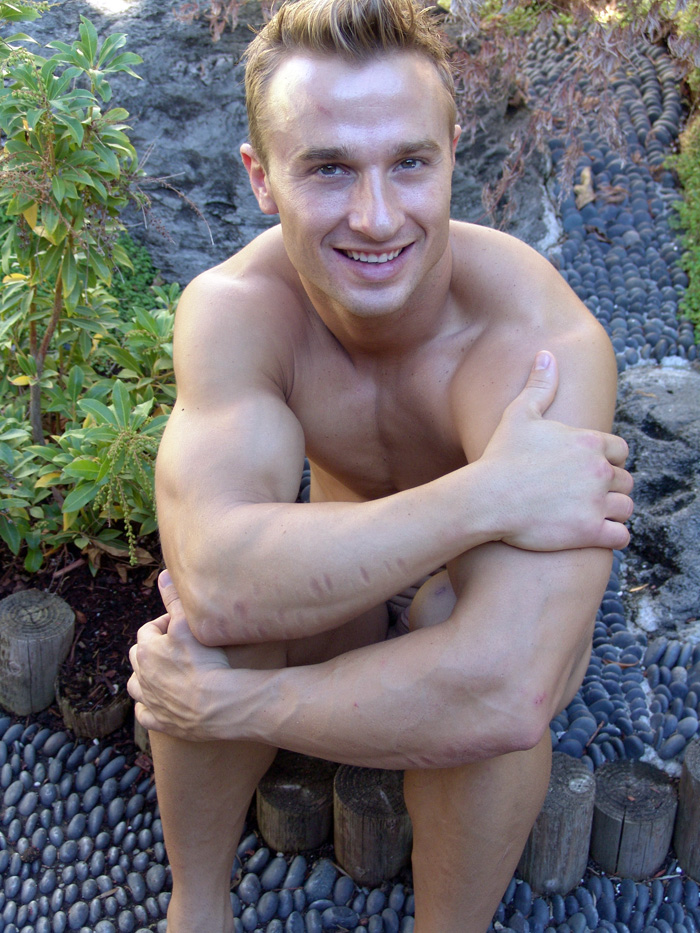
- Davenport in 2006
- Born: January 14, 1978 (age 47); Greenwood, South Carolina, U.S.
- Other names: Derrick Greenleaf
- Occupations: Model; personal trainer
- Known for: Playgirl's 2006 Man of the Year

Derrick Davenport (born January 14, 1978) is an American model, known for being Playgirl's 2006 Man of the Year.

== Filmography ==
Film
Year	Title	Role	Notes
2005	Complete Circuit Training	Himself	Video short
2006	The Art of Exposure	Himself	Video documentary
2006	Yvan Cournoyer: Up Close & Personal	Himself	Video documentary

== Bibliography (selection) ==
- Anthology, Henning von Berg (Un)Dressed to Thrill, Studio Publications, Sydney, 2006, ISBN 0-9775501-5-X
- Henning von Berg Alpha Males, Bruno Gmuender Verlag, Berlin, 2007, ISBN 3-86187-468-7
- Anthology, Dianora Niccolini Night Visions, Bruno Gmeunder, Berlin 2008, ISBN 978-3-86187-892-6
