= A. L. A. Himmelwright =

American writer and engineer

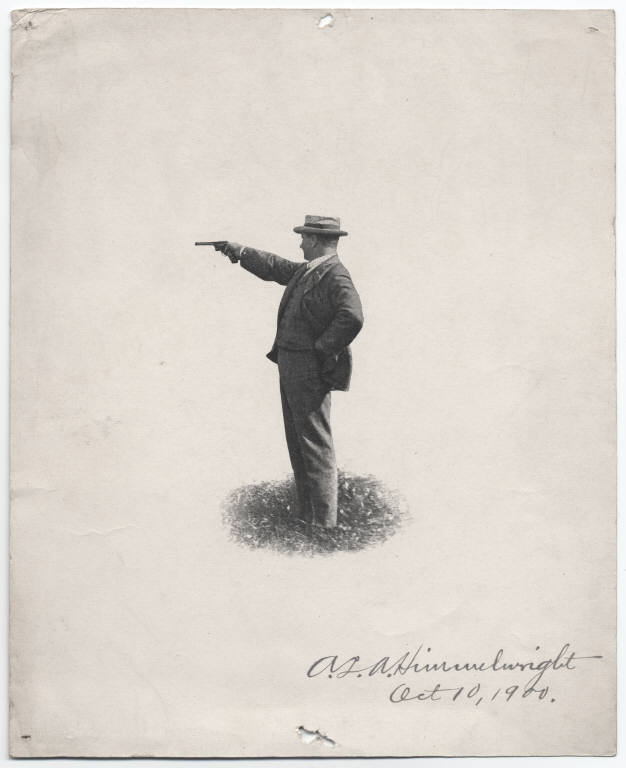
Himmelwright was an expert marksman. This image from 1900, is one of several posed with a pistol. (Photo from Yale University Libraries collection.)

Abraham Lincoln Artman Himmelwright (February 7, 1865 – March 24, 1936) was a civil engineer, author, builder, adventurer, and marksman who was general manager of The Roebling Construction Company, the New York City firm created by John A. Roebling's Sons Company of Trenton, New Jersey. Himmelwright's first and second names were given to him by his parents to honor the slain president, Abraham Lincoln, assassinated the year Himmelwright was born. In most of the works he authored he went by the name "ALA Himmelwright".

== Biography ==
He was born on February 7, 1865, in Milford Square, Pennsylvania. In 1894 he was with the Carlin hunting party which left its cook, George Colgate behind to die. He purchased land in the Stockholm section of Hardyston Township, New Jersey and in 1907 completed a fireproof house made of stone. He died in 1936.

== Publications ==
Himmelwright authored many books and articles, including a harrowing tale of a hunting trip in the Bitterroot Mountains of Idaho and a first-hand account of the famous Johnstown flood in Pennsylvania, published in Harper's Magazine. The former recounted the fate of the "Carlin Hunting Party", in which Himmelwright participated. He wrote the account under the pseudonym Heclawa because of the national notoriety which occurred when the disaster reached the nation's newspapers. The group's cook, George Colgate, died in difficult but disputed circumstances and some accused the men of abandoning him needlessly. For a discussion of the matter not entirely sympathetic to Himmelwright, see Ladd Hamilton's Snowbound (1997). For Himmelright's perspective, see his book In the Heart of the Bitter-Root Mountains.

Himmelwright's books on pistol shooting technique were among the most popular American books on the subject and remained in print from 1904 into the early 1940s. He was president of the U.S. Revolver Association, an early sport governing body, from 1904 to 1906 and won the Association's inaugural national revolver shooting championship match in 1900.

An expert on the danger of fire, in 1899 The Roebling Construction Company published the first of many articles and books by Himmelwright concerning fireproof construction, "Tests of the Roebling System of Fireproof Construction". In 1906, The Roebling Construction Company sought to reinforce its brand and expertise in fireproof development when it published the Himmelwright book, The San Francisco Earthquake and Fire : A Brief History of the Disaster; A Presentation of Facts and Resulting Phenomena, With Special Reference to the Efficiency of Building Materials, Lessons of the Disaster. The catastrophic scale of the 1906 San Francisco earthquake spurned an era of innovation and adoption of new building technology, including reinforced concrete developed by inventors like Ernest L. Ransome.

== The Model Fireproof Farmhouse at Rock Lodge ==
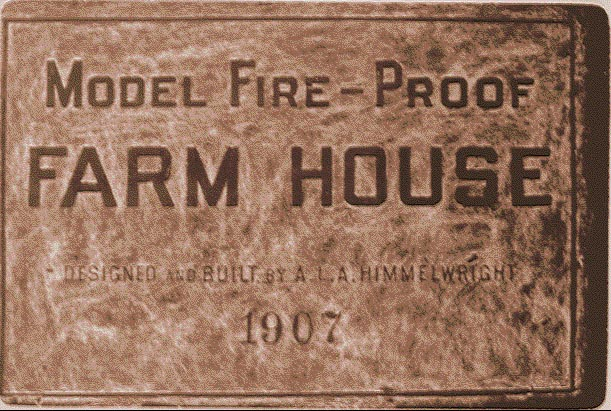
Plaque on model farmhouse.

Two years prior to the publication of The San Francisco Earthquake and Fire, Himmelwright set out to personally prove the merits of fireproof construction, adding to his thinking a philosophy of environmental engineering, sustainable building and permaculture. He purchased 47 acres (190,000 m^{2}) of land about 45 miles (72 km) from New York City in Stockholm, New Jersey, and in 1907 completed the construction of what he called, a "Model Fireproof Farm House". Fire is a big danger on farms, and Himmewright believed it could be prevented with the use of stone found in the immediate environment. The setting for what is now known as "the Stone House" is on a hill or knoll and is in use today as a residence and overnight rental facility at the nonprofit Rock Lodge Club, a nudist resort. To give the setting a picturesque feel, and to provide for scenic views from the model fireproof farmhouse, Himmelwright dredged land below the knoll and built a spring-fed lake, now known as Rock Lodge Pond, a popular summertime nudist swimming destination that is considered the centerpiece of Rock Lodge Club.

When first constructed, features of the model fireproof farmhouse included a state-of-the-art wood fired water system which pumped spring water to a third-floor holding tank; a coal fired furnace with radiators in each room for heat; a similarly stone built garage of sufficient size to accommodate two large touring cars; and awnings and shutters with a concrete sidewalk all around. The walls are of granite, the floors and ceilings of poured concrete with steel reinforcement, the roof is lined with copper. Woodwork, plaster, brickwork, and concrete were all specced to be of "first class materials and workmanship". Himmelwright estimated its lifespan at 400–500 years.

In 1913, Himmelwright published detailed engineering plans, drawings, and instructions on how to build replicas of the Stone House in a book, A Model Fire-Proof Farm House or Country Home: Practical Suggestions for Economical and Enduring Construction, With Complete Plans and Specifications of A Model Building, dedicated to his son Kenneth who had drowned in the lake in 1911 at age 14. The book was first published by The Neale Publishing Company of New York, and republished by Rock Lodge Club on the 100th anniversary of its building in 2007.

Himmelwright was an environmentalist before his time whose belief in sustainable building practices is strongly stated in his preface to A Model Fire-Proof Farm House. He wrote:

"A new epoch in home building is at hand. The wasteful, shortsighted and ephemeral methods of the past have become intolerable, and on account of our depleted timber supply, will soon be impossible.

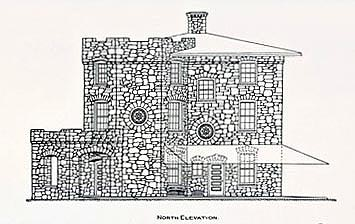
A sketch of the model fireproof farm house in Himmelwright's building plans published in 1913. This view is of the North Elevation.

"The conservation of the world's natural resources is attracting universal attention, and will undoubtedly receive a large portion of the best thought and consideration of the present generation. The conservation of individual resources and energy will follow as a natural consequence, and that is the keynote of this volume.

"The reckless destruction of our forests by the early settlers, supplemented by the wasteful practices of the large lumber companies, and finally, the enormous destruction by forest fires, have brought about greatly changed conditions. Our timber supply has been depleted to such an extent that according to statistics prepared by the United States Government, we take from our forests each year, not counting loss and waste, three and one half times their yearly growth; in other words, we use forty cubic feet per acre for each twelve cubic feet grown. We use two hundred and sixty cubic feet per capita, while Germany uses thirty-seven and France thirty-five. The large per capita consumption in the United States is attributable partly to our great fire losses, but principally to the ephemeral and flimsy character of our buildings. If the present rate of demand and supply is not changed, our timber resources will be entirely exhausted in a few years. Such a result would have far reaching consequences, and would be a national calamity. This can be averted, (1) by substituting incombustible and more durable materials for wood, and (2) by employing proper safeguards and appliances, thus preventing a large part of the annual fire loss.

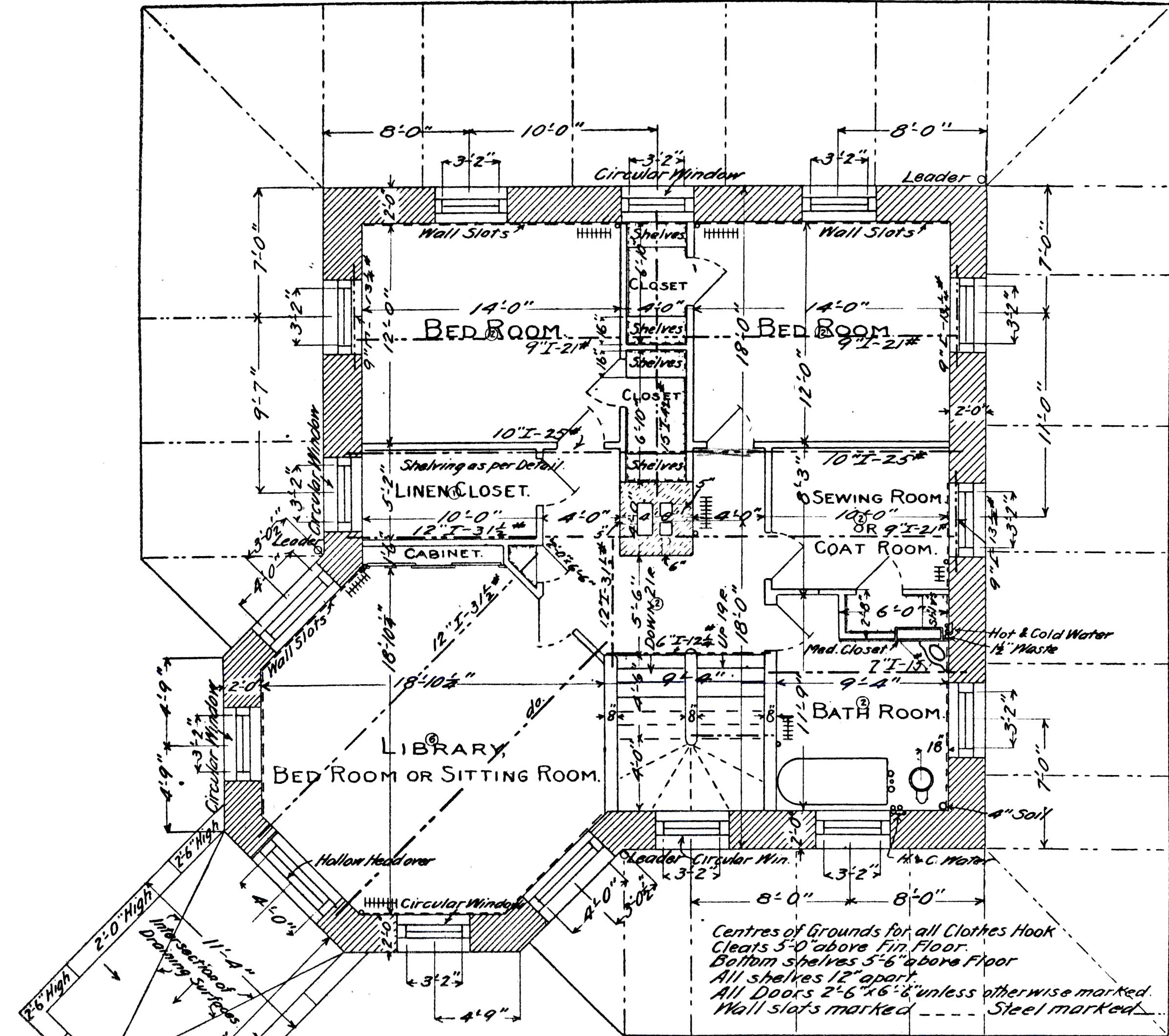
A detailed drawing of the building plans for the second floor of the model fireproof farm house, now known as the Stone House at Rock Lodge Club, from Himmelwright's book. (Click image to enlarge.)

"Twenty to fifty years ago when timber was abundant and the best only was selected for building purposes, much more durable houses were built than at present. Large sized and heavy pieces were used for the framing and the beams. These were frequently hewn by hand, so as to utilize the heart which is the best and most durable part of the timber.

"The cost of lumber is now from two to five times as great as formerly, and the quality is generally much inferior. Wood or "frame" buildings, as now constructed, are serviceable only for periods of from twenty to fifty years. After this comparatively short term, they become unsafe for human habitation and can be utilized only for a few years more for storage, after which, if not demolished, they decay, become dangerous, and finally fall to pieces. By frequent painting, prompt repairs, renewals of roofs, sills, etc., the period of serviceability may sometimes be extended twenty to thirty years longer, but this presumes a practical knowledge of building construction, the exercise of intelligent watchfulness and judgment, and a willingness to expend money for repairs before such repairs are actually necessary— a combination seldom found in present day owners.

"The home builders of the past generally took cognizance of their own immediate necessities and requirements only, and planned and built their homes accordingly. Such a course was the direct result of the fact that the serviceability of the buildings was limited to a period of one or two generations. In the design of a building which is to endure for an indefinite period, other features and a broader policy must influence the design. Instead of planning for his own family or his immediate successors, the designer of an enduring home must plan it so as to fulfill the requirements of an average family. Planned in this way, such a building will always be suitable for a majority of its future occupants and will have the maximum value."

Himmelwright concluded the introduction, adding these comments linking family values to engineering and sustainable building practices:

"A home built of durable and incombustible materials...conserves the resources and energies of the original owner and all his descendants. Its deterioration is inappreciable for from ten to twenty generations, during which time it retains its full original value, plus the added value due to the subsequent development and improvement of the section in which it is located. Consequently, it is a valuable inheritance to each succeeding generation. Furthermore, such a home is cumulative in its tendency and effect, in so far as its contents are concerned. Being durable, and fire-proof, it becomes a permanent receptacle for all the objects of intrinsic and sentimental value, accumulated by the original owner and his descendants; each generation adding its quota to the family treasures, until the home becomes a veritable storehouse of ever increasing value, not only financially, but educationally, and artistically. True, there may be periodical divisions and distributions of some of the contents, but this involves no sacrifice of actual value, and articles removed in this way often find their way back to such a home after the lapse of time. But by far the most important feature of a home of this character is the security and permanent immunity it affords against destruction by fire.

"An enduring and fire-proof home, therefore, conserves the energy and resources of the successive owners, assures permanent safety, comfort and satisfaction, and unlike a frame building, it retains indefinitely its full value as an asset and inheritance."

== Books ==
- — (1895). In The Heart Of The Bitter-Root Mountains: The Story Of THe Carlin Hunting Party, September–December, 1893. New York: G. P. Putnam's Sons.
- — (1906). The San Francisco Earthquake And Fire: A Presentation of Facts And Resulting Phenomena, With Special Reference To The Efficiency of Building Materials Lessons Of The Disaster. New York: The Roebling Construction Company.
- — (1908). The Pistol and Revolver. New York: J. J. Little & Co. material previously included within * Money, A. W.; Horace Kephart; W. E. Carlin; A. L. A. Himmelwright; John Harrington Keene (1904). Guns, Ammunition, And Tackle, a volume of the American Sportsman's Library. New York: The MacMillan Company.
- Model for Fire-Proof Farm House or Country Home (1913) An original volume of this book is available to researchers at the Avery Architectural & Fine Arts Library
- — (1915). Pistol and Revolver Shooting (1922 ed.). New York: The MacMillan Company. (New Rev. Ed. 1928)

== See also ==
- Permaculture
- Environmental engineering
- Natural building
- Sustainable architecture
- Sustainable habitat
