= American Gymnosophical Association =

Early nudism advocacy organization in the United States

The American Gymnosophical Association (AGA) was organized circa 1930 by Herman and Katherine Soshinski. It was one of 3 spin-off groups from the League for Physical Culture that had been organized by Kurt Barthel in 1929. Dr. Maurice Parmelee, Professor of Sociology, City College of New York was its honorary President.

== History ==
Katherine and Herman Soshinki arrived in the US in 1923 from Germany as librarians of the New York Public Library. They had become familiar with nudist practice in Germany from 1918 to 1923. Once in the US they continued their subscription to the German newspapers where they saw the advertisements by Kurt Barthel soliciting German residents to assist in the formation of nudist groups. They joined the group, the League of Physical Culture spending time with others at leased farms in Westchester County in summers and gymnasiums and pools in New York in the winter before organizing the American Gymnosophical Association. Due to the anti-nudity laws in New York they searched for a location which led them to Rock Lodge. Membership soon grew to over 300 and national nudist conventions were held at Rock Lodge Club in 1936, 1938, and 1941.

Rock Lodge Club compared most favorably with the other camps, not only in the scenic beauties, conveniences, and housing facilities, but with the personnel of the membership body at large, as well as the directors in particular. The group had an office in Manhattan and by 1933 had leased an 11-acre (45,000 m^{2}) camp in the foothills of the Catskills and accepted another farm of 60 acres (240,000 m^{2}) nearer the city. Miss Ruth Winkler was the secretary of the Association.

Like other groups interested in nudism, the American Gymnosophical Associates, maintained a well-equipped gymnasium in New York City during the winter months, where calisthenics and other exercises were indulged in under expert guidance.

A 1932 painting by artist Richard Ederheimer (1878–1959) indicating nudist activities at Rock Lodge Club is in the collection of the New Jersey Historical Society.

In 1936 looking to expand its operation in the winter months the AGA advertised for a secretary for its new camp Mossy Oaks located in Lake Thonotosassa, Tampa, Florida which was, at that time, Tampa's only nudist facility. By 1939 both locations had been approved for National American Sunbathing Association charter, Oakland, NJ. The AGA had to discontinue renting country places in Florida in 1943 because of financial difficulties due to World War II.

The original AGA logo contained the words mens sana in corpore sano (a healthy mind in a healthy body). In an early AGA publication at Camp Rock Lodge in Stockholm, New Jersey are the statements "So perfect a paradise for the practice of nudism has not many parallels in America. It is all ours! The whole lake and miles of winding paths over the mountain-ranges!" "Back to nature, but not too far back". Rock Lodge Club continues to operate as a non-profit nudist co-operative club at the same location.

The AGA was inspired by the idea that nude sunbathing was a healthy way of life. This belief seems to have first gained popularity in Germany in the 1890s following the publication of two influential books, Heinrich Pudor's The Cult Of The Nude and Richard Ungewitter's Die Nacktheit (Nakedness), a utopia of nude living.

In the early 1920s while in Germany, Dr. Parmelee researched the movement having read reference to it in a book written by Havelock Ellis on sex and society in 1912. He obtained literature on the subject and then was able to visit and take part in the nudist groups that had formed in Germany. It was during this time he realized he had opportunity to observe and study a significant movement from a psychological and sociological aspect and was encouraged to write a book on social nudism.

Back in New York during the winter of 1923–24 Dr. Parmelee wrote the book The New Gymnosophy the first edition of which was published in 1927 by F.H. Hitchcock, NY with his agreed upon financial assistance. He is the author of the first book on Nudism in the English language. He also wrote a paper entitled "Nacktkultur Under National Socialism".

Dr. Maurice Parmelee, was born in Istanbul, Turkey in 1882. He received doctorate degrees from Yale and Columbia universities and taught anthropology, Sociology and Economics at the universities of Kansas, Missouri and Minnesota and is the author of over 15 books.

In his later years Dr. Parmelee founded the American Gymnosophical Society, an Illinois chartered non-profit, tax exempt organization which published a 4-page brochure entitled "Gymnosophy". The pamphlet states the society was given affiliation in 1952 with the Societe Internationale de Gymnosophie which itself was founded in 1926 by Kene D'Mongeot in France. In 1952 Dr. Parmelee had retired from government service.

== See also ==
- Gymnosophists
- Naturism
- Timeline of non-sexual social nudity
