= Rock Lodge Club =

Naturist club in northern New Jersey, United States

Coordinates: 41°04′22″N 74°32′01″W

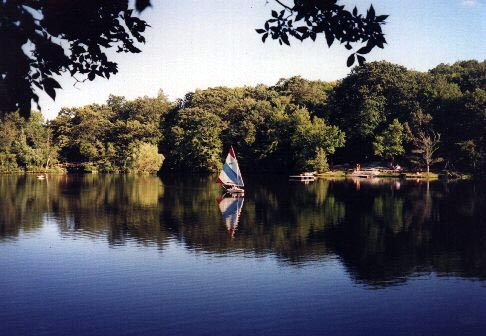
Rock Lodge pond swimming lake

Rock Lodge Club is a naturist club located on 145 acres (59 ha) of privately owned land in the Stockholm area of the Hardyston Township, New Jersey, which is situated on the New Jersey Highlands of North Jersey, about 40 miles (64 km) from Manhattan, New York. Rock Lodge Club and Sky Farm, also based in New Jersey, were founded in 1932 as the first permanent nudist communities in the United States. Both clubs are active today.

== History ==
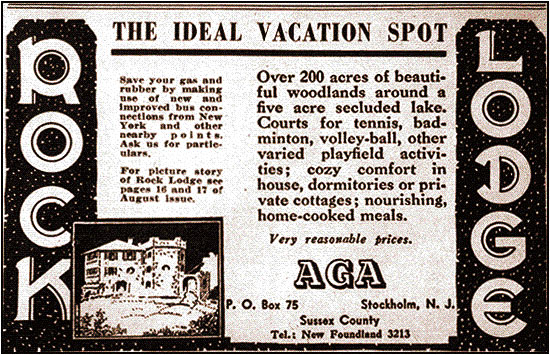
This newspaper ad probably ran in the 1940s during World War II given its reference to saving gasoline and "rubber" tires, and touting Rock Lodge Club's proximity to New York City. In the ad, AGA stands for the American Gymnosophical Association, the group promoting social nudism at the time.

The eponymous Rock Lodge Stone House was built as a model fireproof farm house by engineer A. L. A. Himmelwright in 1907, and presently used as a residence and overnight rental facility at Rock Lodge Club.

In the late nineteenth century, A. L. A. Himmelwright, an engineer at the Roebling Construction Company, bought the land that today is used by Rock Lodge nudist club. Prior to this, the property in the New Jersey Highlands, was used for timber and agriculture. There is also evidence of iron prospecting, possibly connected to a Thomas Edison mine works located nearby.

In 1904–1905, Himmelwright used oxen to dredge a swamp, and built a dam to create a lake fed by a stream located near the lake, as well as by 17 underwater springs. This main spring is mentioned in deeds and early leases as a water supply for surrounding neighbors as well as for Rock Lodge.

In 1907, Himmelwright erected a "model fireproof farmhouse", now known as the Stone House, which features a poured concrete roof, stained glass, a basement with coal furnace, and a state-of-the-art (in its day) water supply system which pumped water from the spring to a holding tank on the third floor. In 2007, to celebrate the 100th anniversary of the Stone House, the original plans for the construction of the building were reproduced.

Other historic buildings that are maintained and in use today included a stable (now known as the Hacienda that houses the Club's office), an ice house, where, prior to the availability of refrigeration, ice harvested from the lake in the winter was stored for use through the summer. Around 1919, Himmelwright built a bungalow (clubhouse), when the property was being used as a training camp for boxers—during the Roaring Twenties the property was a training camp for Jack Dempsey, boxers and wrestlers. Ben Roller, a physician and world class professional wrestler, ran the Rock Lodge Health Farm as per display advertisement in the NY Times 1921. Display ads also ran in the Magazine of Wall Street in 1922. Amenities included an indoor world class handball court and coal heat, with a fireplace and living room. Two historic cabins from the 1940s build from kits produced by the E. F. Hodgson Company are on the grounds and used as residences.

During the Great Depression, Herman Shoshinsky leased the property as the proprietor of the American Gymnosophical Association (A.G.A.), and nudism came to Rock Lodge.

In 1938 or 1939, the property was bought by Francis E. dePaolo, a chiropractor who lived across Rock Lodge Road near the spring. In 1942, Dr. dePaolo and Shoshinsky had a falling out, and the A.G.A. moved to Newfoundland, New Jersey. Rock Lodge as a cooperative nudist club began that year with a one-year lease. In 1946, a 10-year lease was negotiated with dePaolo, and summer cabins began to appear, though some may have been built in the 1930s. In 1957, a 40-year lease was signed, and a building boom occurred. Along with summer cabins, much of the club infrastructure was built in the late 1950s and 1960s.

By the late 1980s, the end of a 40-year lease was in the near future, and several attempts were made to organize a purchase by members. In 1990, Rock Properties Inc. was formed as a non-profit organization, and money was raised by members for the purchase of 35 acres (14 ha). Another land purchase was made in 1995, bringing the total present club to 145 acres (59 ha).

Rock Lodge Club is a member of the American Association for Nude Recreation.
