= Paul Bindrim =

Psychtherapist who developed nude psychotherapy

- Born: August 14, 1920; New York City, New York, United States
- Died: December 17, 1997 (aged 77); Los Angeles, California, United States
- Education: Bachelor's degree, Columbia University; Master's degree, Duke University
- Occupation: Psychotherapist
- Known for: Nude psychotherapy

E. Paul Bindrim (14 August 1920 in New York City – 17 December 1997 in Los Angeles) was an American psychotherapist who is known as the founder of nude psychotherapy which he believed allowed people to access and express repressed feelings more easily.

== Early career ==
Born in New York City, Bindrim earned a bachelor's degree from Columbia University and a master's degree at Duke University, where he did research in parapsychology under J.B. Rhine who coined the term ESP.

He was ordained in the Church of Divine Metaphysics in 1958 and served as a minister of the Church of Religious Science in Glendale.

He obtained his psychologist license in California in 1967, and later served as president of the Group Psychotherapy Association of Southern California in 1978–79.

In his early work, Bindrim created a group psychotherapy strategy in which participants were encouraged to recall peak experiences, which he called "peak oriented psychotherapy". This was based in part on ideas about peak experiences described by Abraham Maslow, considered the father of Humanistic Psychology. The encounter group movement was also an inspiration. After observing that towards the end of a long encounter group its participants would be easy about nakedness in front of each other Bindrim reasoned that introducing nudity early in the group might accelerate the transition to emotional openness.

== Nude psychotherapy ==
Bindrim corresponded with Abraham Maslow on the subject of nude psychotherapy groups which Maslow, who was then-president of the American Psychological Association, supported. In 1967, Bindrim conducted his first nude workshop in Deer Park, California. There were typically 15 to 25 participants.

Bindrim developed his nude encounter marathons into a weekend workshop using nudity and swimming pools, which was recorded in the 1971 documentary film entitled "Out of Touch" by the Canadian Film Board and produced by Bindrim .

The American Psychological Association's Ethics Committee decided to investigate him prompted by conservative politicians, but, due to the cultural climate of the late 1960s and the fact that the nudity was consensual, this was dropped.

== Lawsuit ==
In 1971 he sued the novelist Gwen Davis Mitchel and her publisher, Doubleday, alleging that a depiction of a fictional psychotherapist in her novel Touching was a veiled depiction of him and defamed him and his profession. In 1969 Mitchel had attended one of his nude psychotherapy marathons and signed a contract never to write about the experience. Bindrim was very concerned about confidentiality, and had produced a lengthy contract that every participant was required to sign. Bindrim won a landmark court decision that now gives all psychotherapists more confidentiality protection and received $75,000 in damages. The court's decision left many novelists fearful of being sued by people who inspired their books.

== Later career ==
By the late 1970s, Bindrim replaced nude psychotherapy with "aqua-energetics" based on Wilhelm Reich's theories, specifically the idea of "orgone energy." Interest in radical forms of psychotherapy declined in the 1980s and Bindrim continued to practice with a more conventional model.

Bindrim died on Dec. 17 1997 at Cedars-Sinai Medical Center in Los Angeles. He was 77.
