= Henning von Berg =

German photographer (born 1961)

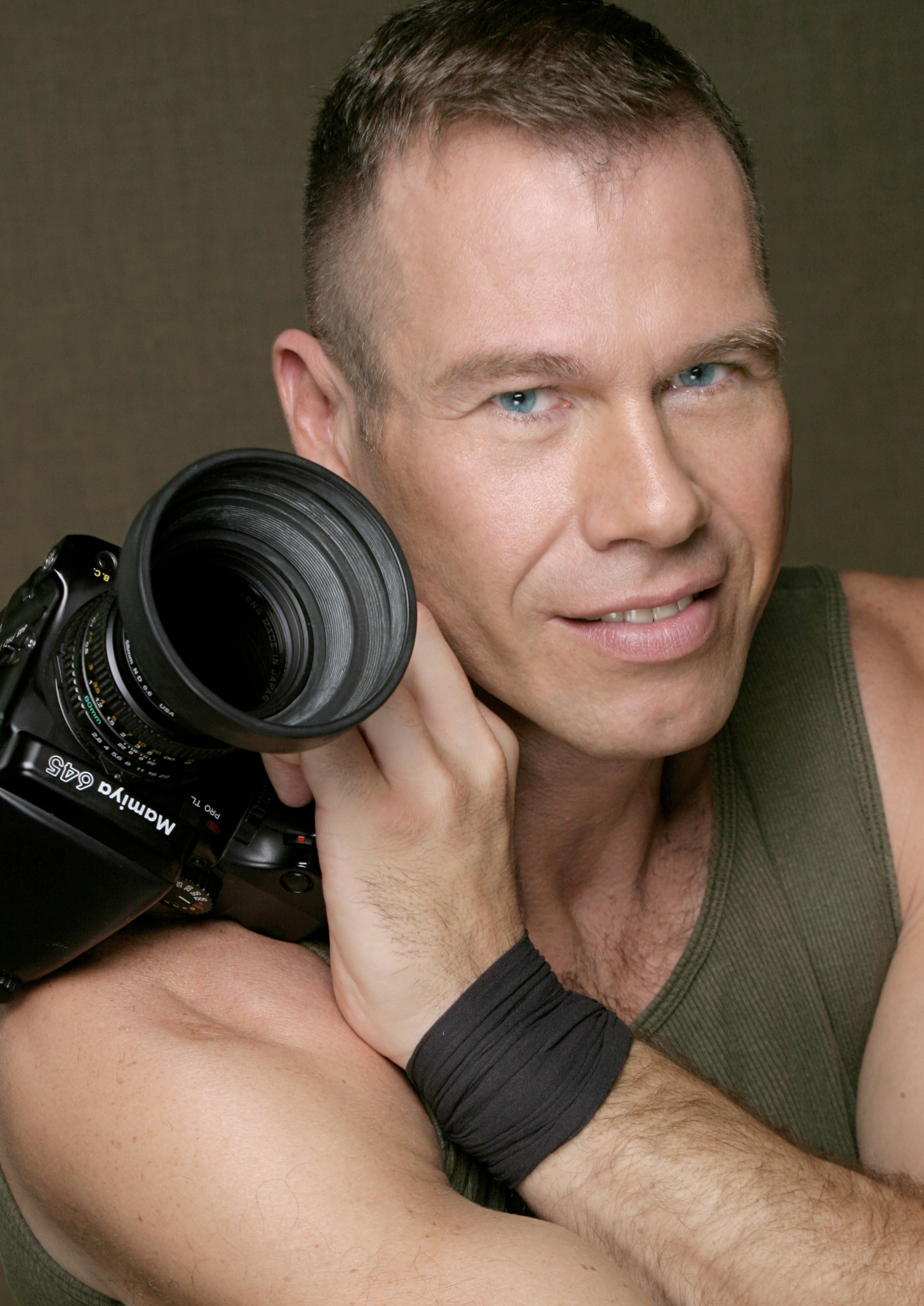
- Henning von Berg in 2011. Portrait by JohnAigner for HvB.
- Born: 10 June 1961 (age 65); Hanover, West Germany
- Occupations: Civil engineer, photographer

Henning von Berg (born 10 June 1961) is a former German civil engineer who became a portrait photographer. His specialty is character portraits and fine art nudes.

== Biography ==
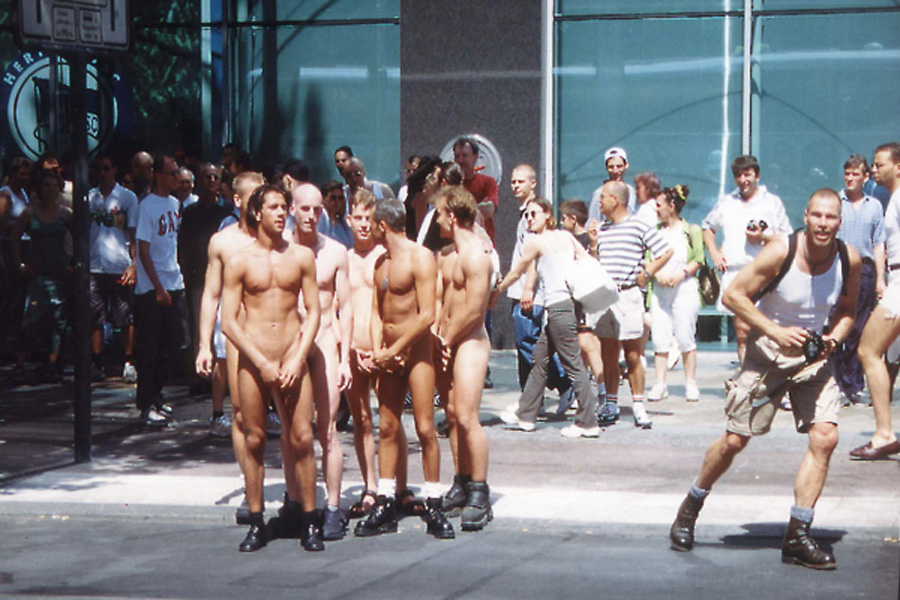
NakedBerlin-Tauentzien Photographer Henning von Berg (right) and his group of nude men on Berlin's main shopping boulevard Tauentzien

Henning von Berg was born in Northern Germany into a family with a nearly 550-year-old history. He worked as an engineer for thirteen years until the age of 35, when he discovered his calling was to be a photographer.

In the summer of 1997, he organized his first group photo shoot. This featured 28 nude men in an abandoned factory in Cologne, on the river Rhine. Afterwards, the exhibition "Factory Boyz" quickly gained attention all around Germany for its bizarre combination of "body & building". Just one year later the image "Stairway" of this series with 13 nude male models was chosen by an American publisher to be included in an international anthology about photography:

In Phil Braham's book "Naked Men Exposed - A Celebration of the Male Nude from 90 of the World's Greatest Photographers", the self-taught Berg was listed beside photographer icons like David Hockney, Horst P. Horst, Harriet Leibowitz, Robert Mapplethorpe, Eadweard Muybridge, Man Ray and Andy Warhol.

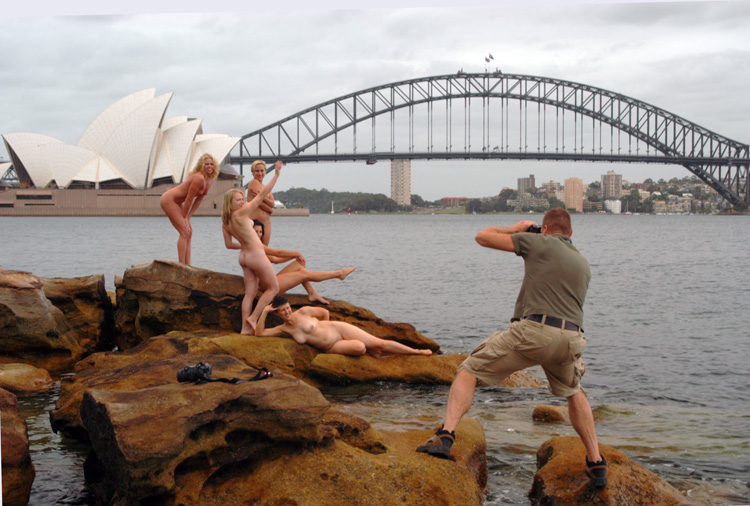
Naked Sydney: Photographer Henning von Berg and his group of naked women in front of Sydney's Opera House

In 1999, von Berg claimed more recognition by organizing a whimsical social-political statement on public nudity. With his team he photographed six completely naked men in front of a dozen tourist highlights of Berlin, including the inside of the historical parliament Reichstag building. Thousands of fascinated passers-by applauded the fun happening throughout the city.

This series "Naked Berlin" was supposed to be a political comment to show the liberal atmosphere and open-minded politics of the reunified republic. The politically active Berg wanted to document that his home country has learned from the terrible Nazi history and that Germany now is a modern democracy with a tolerant spirit and total freedom for the arts.

The fun photographs of "Naked Berlin" were published by newspapers around the globe as "Reichstags Rascals". To date, the series "Naked Berlin" remains the world's first and only-ever male nude photo shoot inside of a parliament building.

In 2005, von Berg produced a suitable counterpart by photographing the other gender on the other side of the earth. The scandalous series "Naked Sydney" documented a group of happy naked women in downtown Sydney in front of some Australian national symbols, including the famous Sydney Opera House.

Later both series were presented in exhibitions worldwide. The Goethe-Institut, a German non-profit organization whose mission is to promote German language and culture outside of the German-speaking countries, promoted the exhibit "Naked Berlin - Naked Sydney" internationally and thus far more than 200,000 people have seen the exhibitions.

== Recent work ==
Henning von Berg is specialized in character portraits of seniors (his oldest model so far is a 108-year-old woman) and fine art nudes of mostly amateurs models. Von Berg prefers shooting in natural light conditions and likes to integrate panoramic landscapes and monumental buildings into his art.

For his various art projects, he likes to break traditional rules. He works with young and old people, men and women, aristocrats and prostitutes, athletes and disabled people, common folks and celebrities (e.g., Julius Shulman, Tim Curry, Kurt Kreuger, Derrick Davenport and Don Bachardy).

In autumn of 2006, the international non-profit art organization Tom of Finland Foundation in Los Angeles asked von Berg to become a "Foundation Liaison" to Germany/Europe. At the same time, a well-known Australian publishing house appointed him as a "Correspondent" for the high-profile photography magazines "[not only] Blue" and "[not only] Black+White".

To date, his work has appeared in more than 540 international publications and 47 exhibitions in museums and galleries on four continents.

== Exhibitions (selection) ==
- Goethe Institut Los Angeles "Naked Berlin | The Liberal Capital"
- Advocate Gallery in Hollywood "City Of Angels Gates Of Hell"
- Kunstforum Köln "Colognia | California"
- Feitico Gallery in Chicago "Angels"
- Auction House Villa Grisebach in Berlin "Reichstagslümmel"
- Art Foundation ToF-Foundation in Hollywood "Erotic Art Fair"
- Galleries in Köln, Münster, Dortmund, Bielefeld "Factory Boyz"
- Catherine Beatty Gallery in Sydney "Naked Berlin | The Liberal Capital"
- Park Hotel Hyatt-Levantehaus in Hamburg "Art Meets Charity"
- Plaza Hotel in Washington, D.C. "M.A.L. 2000"
- Leather Archives & Museum in Chicago "Stairway"
- Flinders Hotel in Sydney "Universal"
- Gallery Kunst(B)handlung in Munich "Subversiv"
- Highway's Gallery in Venice Beach "GWM"
- Gallery Deja Design in Los Angeles "QATB Universal"
- Festival Divers/City, Parc Emilie-Gamelin in Montreal "Naked Berlin | Naked Sydney"
- Gallery Tristesse Deluxe in Berlin with Nan Goldin and others
- Gallery Camen de la Guerra in Madrid "La Mirada G"
- Salon SIGL International, Carrousel du Louvres (Pyramid) in Paris "Alpha Males"
- Gallery Dennis Dean in Fort Lauderdale "Retrospective 1997-2010"

== Selected bibliography ==
- Henning von Berg, Men Pure – Retrospective 1997-2007 [The First 10 Years], Lifetime Photographs, Seattle, 2010, ISBN 978-3-00-033248-7
- Henning von Berg, Alpha Males, Bruno Gmuender Verlag, Berlin, 2007, ISBN 3-86187-468-7
- Anthology Nude Bible, Udyat & Tectum Publishers, Barcelona and Brussels, 2007, ISBN 978-90-76886-50-3
- Henning von Berg, Kingdome 19, Universal 2, Bruno Gmuender Verlag, Berlin, 2008, ISBN 3-86187-911-5
- Anthology Nude Bible - mini, Tectum Publishers, Brussels, 2008, ISBN 978-90-76886-76-3
- Robert Vescio, (un)Dressed To Thrill, Studio Publications, Sydney, 2006, ISBN 0-9775501-5-X
- Henning von Berg, Kingdome 19, Universal – Handcrafted Uniques, Bruno Gmuender Verlag, Berlin, 2004, ISBN 3-86187-655-8
- Anthology, Naked - Female and Male Nudes, Feierabend Verlag, Köln-Berlin, 2005, ISBN 3-89985-160-9
- James Spada, The Romantic Male Nude, Abrams Publishering, New York, 2006, ISBN 0-8109-9371-6
- Claus Kiessling, Visions – Contemporary Photography, Bruno Gmuender Verlag, Berlin, 2006, ISBN 3-86187-870-4
- John Rechy, Numerados - Numbers, Editorial Egales, Barcelona, 2005, ISBN 84-95346-62-1
- Sandra Morrow, The Power Of Commerce, Exhibition Industry Inc, Las Vegas, ISBN 1-882933-48-6
- Anthology, Lovers, Studio Publications, Sydney, 2005, ISBN 0-9751914-5-4
- Rinaldo Hopf, Axel Schock, Mein Auge 3, Konkursbuch Verlag, Tuebingen, 2006, ISBN 3-88769-393-0
- Anthology, Deep Blue, Studio Publications, Sydney, 2004, ISBN 0-9750881-8-1
- Robert Vescio, Dreamboys III, Studio Publications, Sydney, 2003, ISBN 0-9581709-0-8
- Anthology Male Nudes IndeXX, Peter Feierabend Verlag, Köln-Berlin, 2005, ISBN 978-3-89985-250-9
- Anthology Fetish Fantasies, Peter Feierabend Verlag, Köln-Berlin, 2008, ISBN 978-3-939998-77-8
- Anthology International Nudes Photography, vol. 3, Peter Feierabend Verlag, Köln-Berlin, 2008, ISBN 978-3-939998-82-2
- Rinaldo Hopf, Axel Schock, Mein Auge 14, Konkursbuch Verlag, Tuebingen, 2018, ISBN 978-3-88769-944-4
- Anthology, Blue Muse, Studio Publication, Sydney, 2005, ISBN 0-9757612-5-0
- Henning von Berg, David Vance, Rick Day Beauty of Men, collection 4, Bruno Gmuender Verlag, Berlin, 2013, ISBN 978-3-86787-595-0
- Robert Vescio, Dreamboys II, Studio Publications, Sydney, 2000, ISBN 0-9578177-1-1
- Volker Janssen, American Black Beauty – Volume 2, Janssen Publishers, Cape Town, 2001, ISBN 0-9584314-4-2
- Greg Day, Metamorphose, Janssen Publishers, Cape Town, 1998, ISBN 3-925-443-84-3
- Dr Dietmar Kreutzer, Maennermodels Pur, Verlag Bauwesen, Berlin, 2000, ISBN 3-345-00732-0
- Robert Vescio, Dreamboys, Studio Publications, Sydney, 1999, ISBN 0-9578177-1-1

== Bibliography (books about Henning von Berg, selection) ==
- Phil Braham (Hrsg), Exposed: A Celebration of the Male Nude from 90 of the World's Greatest Photographers, Thunder's Mouth Press, London, 2000, ISBN 1-56025-301-0
- Reed Massengill, Self-Exposure - The Male Nude Self Portrait, Universe Publishing/Rizzoli, New York, 2006, ISBN 0-7893-1317-0
- David Leddick, Male Nude Now - Contemporary Photography, Universe Publishing/Rizzoli, New York, 2001, ISBN 0-7893-0635-2
- Kriss Rudolph, Paaroli, Bruno Gmuender Verlag, Berlin, 2005, ISBN 3-86187-597-7
- Bernd Lasdin Jeder Mensch ist ein Mensch, Verlag Seffen, Berlin, 2004, ISBN 3-937669-03-5
- Barbara Cardy, Mammoth Book of Gorgeous Guys, Constabler Robinson, New York, 2016, ISBN 978-1-84901-374-1
- Phil Braham, Naked Men: Neunzig weltberühmte Fotografen, Umschau/Braus, Frankfurt/Main, 2000, ISBN 3-8295-6833-9
