= Stockholm, New Jersey =

Populated place in Sussex County, New Jersey, US

- Unincorporated community
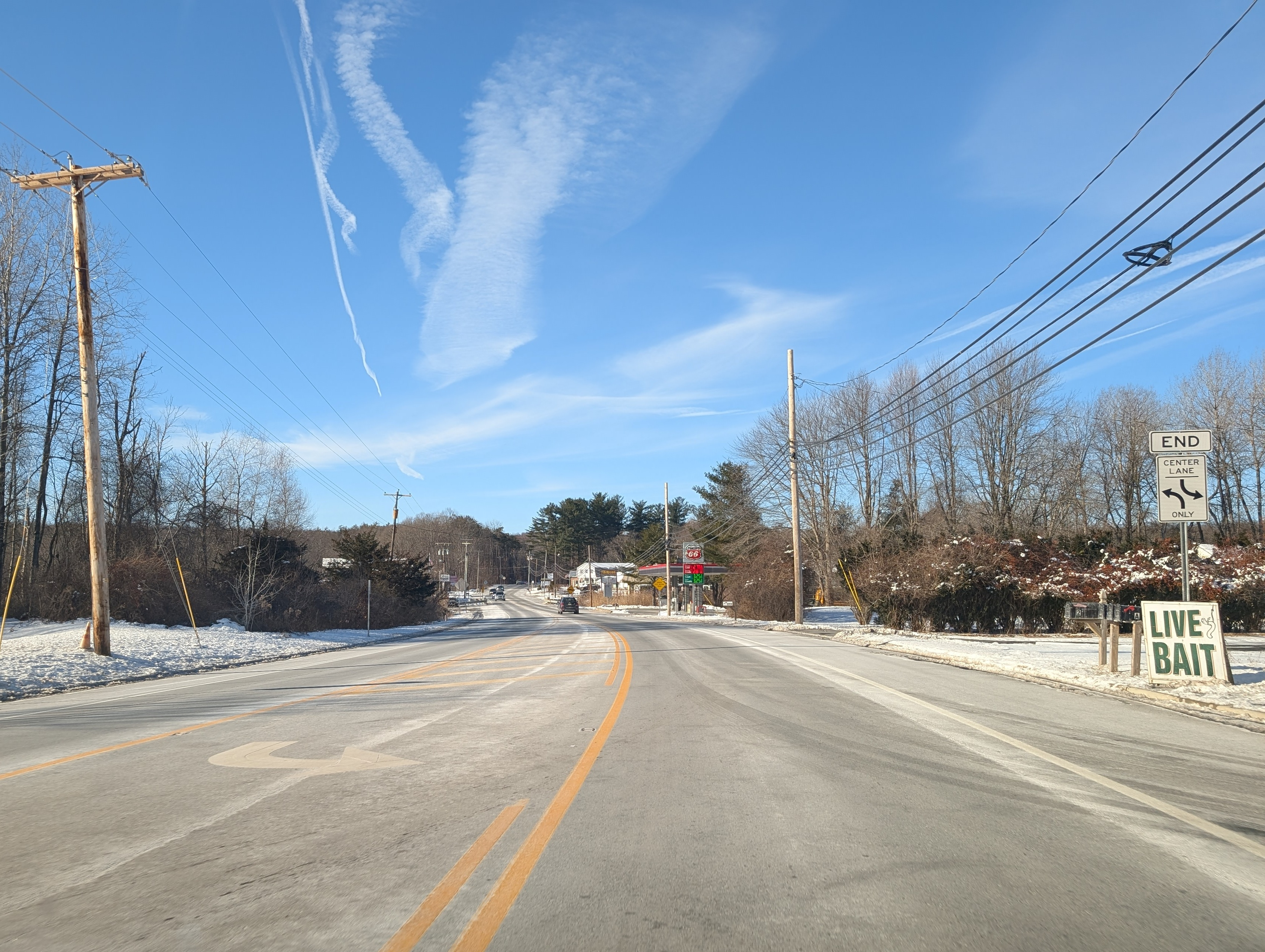
- Route 23 northbound in Stockholm

- Stockholm's location in Sussex County (Inset: Sussex County in New Jersey) Stockholm, New Jersey (New Jersey) Stockholm, New Jersey (the United States)
- Coordinates: 41°05′22″N 74°31′02″W
- Country: United States
- State: New Jersey
- County: Sussex
- Township: Hardyston
- Elevation: 1,033 ft (315 m)

Population (2010)
  - Total: 3,457
- ZIP Code: 07460
- GNIS feature ID: 0880911

Stockholm is an unincorporated community located in the southeastern part of Hardyston Township in Sussex County, in the U.S. state of New Jersey. Its ZIP Code is 07460. Like many neighboring towns, Stockholm is home to a number of lakes including Deer Trail Lakes, Lake Stockholm, Lake Gerard, Beaver Lake, Lake Tamarack and Summit Lake.

Stockholm was known in colonial times as "Snufftown", which got its name from the action for traveling to the top of the mountain to go buy liquor. Those residing in other towns would proceed to Snufftown to go drinking. The New Jersey Midland Railway named a station in the area "Stockholm", which replaced "Snufftown". Despite the name, there is no evidence of a connection to Sweden or to settlement by Swedes in the area.

As of the 2010 United States census, the population for ZIP Code Tabulation Area 07460 was 3,457.

== Climate ==
This climatic region is typified by large seasonal temperature differences, with warm to hot (and often humid) summers and cold (sometimes severely cold) winters. According to the Köppen Climate Classification system, Stockholm has a humid continental climate, abbreviated "Dfb" on climate maps. This climate makes it suitable for naturism and the Rock Lodge Club naturist resort is near Lake Stockholm.

== Emergency service ==
The Stockholm Fire Department, also known as the Hardyston Fire Department Company 1, was founded in 1955. It is located at 7 Colson Terrace.

== Notable people ==
People who were born in, residents of, or otherwise closely associated with Hardyston Township include:

- A. L. A. Himmelwright (1865-1936), a civil engineer, author, adventurer and marksman who was the general manager of The Roebling Construction Company.
- Christopher Sieber (born 1969), actor best known for his roles as Kevin Burke in Two of a Kind starring Mary-Kate Olsen and Ashley Olsen, and Lord Farquaad in Shrek the Musical.
